= Ellen Fullard-Leo =

Hawaiian promoter of amateur athletics (1884–1974)

- Fullard-Leo in 1924
- Born: Ellen Barber Fullard; June 25, 1884; Barrydale, Cape Colony
- Died: September 26, 1974 (aged 90); Honolulu, Hawaii, United States
- Occupation: Sportswriter
- Known for: Promotion of women's and amateur athletics; ownership of Palmyra Atoll
- Spouse: Leslie Leo (m. 1908; died 1950)
- Children: 3, including Leslie

Ellen Barber Fullard-Leo (née Fullard; June 25, 1884 – September 26, 1974) was a South African-born American supporter of amateur athletics. Born in South Africa, she married Leslie Fullard-Leo in 1908. The couple moved abroad in 1909, eventually moving to Honolulu after visiting in 1915. While in South Africa she developed an interest in swimming, and set up women's swimming clubs there and in other cities she later lived in. She became part of the Hawaiian Amateur Athletic Union (AAU), and the first female member of the AAU's National Executive Committee.

Fullard-Leo spent much of her life in Hawaii promoting amateur athletics, helping to form the American Olympic Association and later its Hawaiian chapter. She was a sportswriter for The Honolulu Advertiser for multiple decades, and was listed in the Hawaiʻi Sports Hall of Fame and the International Swimming Hall of Fame.

While living in Hawaii, Ellen Fullard-Leo and her husband purchased most of Palmyra Atoll. The atoll was occupied by the United States government in 1939 to support action taken during World War II. After a multi-year legal dispute, the Supreme Court of the United States ruled that the atoll belonged to the Fullard-Leos in 1947.

== Early life ==
Ellen Barber Fullard-Leo was born in Barrydale, Cape Colony (now South Africa), on June 25, 1884, to father William Fullard and mother Johanna Hermina Susanna Minnaar. Her father descended from Irish settlers, while her mother descended from French Huguenots. She grew up on an ostrich farm. She had five older step-brothers, 12 older full brothers, one older sister, and one younger sibling. Her family also included 12 other boys who grew up alongside them but were not officially adopted. In 1891 at age 7, Ellen was sent to a boarding school in Swellendam. She was later homeschooled, before being trained for missionary work at Huguenot College from age 14.

From 1902 to 1908 Ellen lived and worked in Cape Town and Johannesburg. She did not speak any English until she was 19. In 1908 she founded the first women's swim club in Johannesburg.

In 1908 Ellen sailed to England and from there to New York City. She married Leslie Leo, an Australian-born friend from Johannesburg 19 years older than her, on June 24, 1908. The two shared an interest in swimming. Their first son, Leslie Vincent Fullard-Leo, was born on September 6, 1909. The couple moved to Victoria in 1912. In 1914 Ellen Fullard-Leo founded the first women's swimming club of Victoria, becoming its president. Her husband was also an enthusiast for amateur athletics, and she assisted him with coaching track and field.

== Life in Hawaii ==
On a trip from Victoria to Australia in 1915, Fullard-Leo stopped off in Honolulu. The couple decided to move there, buying a property in Waikīkī from Jonah Kūhiō Kalanianaʻole. One year after moving to Hawaii, Fullard-Leo became part of the Ulunui Swim Club, which was affiliated with the local Amateur Athletic Union (AAU). She organized Royal Life Saving Society courses in 1917, for both men and women. These were the only Royal Life Saving Society courses to take place in the United States, and created Hawaii's first lifeguards. Also in 1917, she was elected secretary-treasurer of the Hawaiian AAU, later becoming its Director.

In 1921 Fullard-Leo became part of the National Executive Committee. While her gender was known to the Hawaiian branch of the AAU when they elected her, an act likely facilitated by a long tradition of female leadership in Hawaii, other members of the National AAU meeting in Chicago were only aware of the name "E. B. Fullard-Leo" until she arrived. Fullard-Leo was thus the first woman to join the National Executive Committee, and remained on the committee until her death. Her work in the Hawaiian branch of the AAU included organizing events for children. She also designed a "sensible bathing costume" at the request of the AAU, which became the national standard for women swimmers.

Fullard-Leo served as secretary for at least eight different organizations in the 1920s, including the Hawaiian Trail and Mountain Club and the Honolulu Housewives' League. She and her husband received a commendation by the Honolulu Chamber of Commerce in 1923, for founding Hawaii's first cement roof and floor tile factory. In 1918, Fullard-Leo became secretary-treasurer of the Pan-Pacific Union and took work with the Mid-Pacific Magazine. She visited Australia in 1919 as a representative of the organization, part of a self-funded eight country Pacific tour. In 1921, she was involved in the formal creation of the American Olympic Association. She served on the 1924 Paris and 1952 Helsinki Summer Olympic Games Executive Committees, officiated at the 1932 Summer Olympics in Los Angeles and the 1951 Pan American Games in Buenos Aires. Her presence in the 1924 Olympics made her the first woman official. In 1925 she accompanied a Hawaiian swimming team to Australia, New Zealand, Florida, and Canada, an example of her work as a fundraiser, manager, and chaperone for teams going to Australia, the Olympic Games, and national competitions.

In 1939, Fullard-Leo and Seishiro Okazaki founded the American Jujitsu Institute, and Fullard-Leo became a lifetime member. Fullard-Leo was behind Judo becoming an AAU sport in 1951. She was also a lifetime member of swimming and track organizations, among others. In 1958, Fullard-Leo helped establish a Hawaiian chapter of the United States Olympic & Paralympic Committee. She served as its secretary until she died.

The second son of Ellen and Leslie Fullard-Leo, Dudley Leinani, was born on September 20, 1928. Their third son, Ainsley Allen Kahealani, was born on October 22, 1931. Ellen's husband Leslie died in 1950.

Fullard-Leo was hired by the Honolulu Star-Bulletin in 1951, to cover a United Nations meeting in Santiago, Chile. Fullard-Leo worked as a sportswriter for The Honolulu Advertiser for the following decade, perhaps being the only regular woman sportswriter in the country.

In 1966, the AAU declared Fullard-Leo "America's Grande Dame of Amateur Athletics". In 1972, Fullard-Leo was given Honolulu's "Mother of the Year" award (coming second in the national contest).

== Palmyra Atoll ownership ==
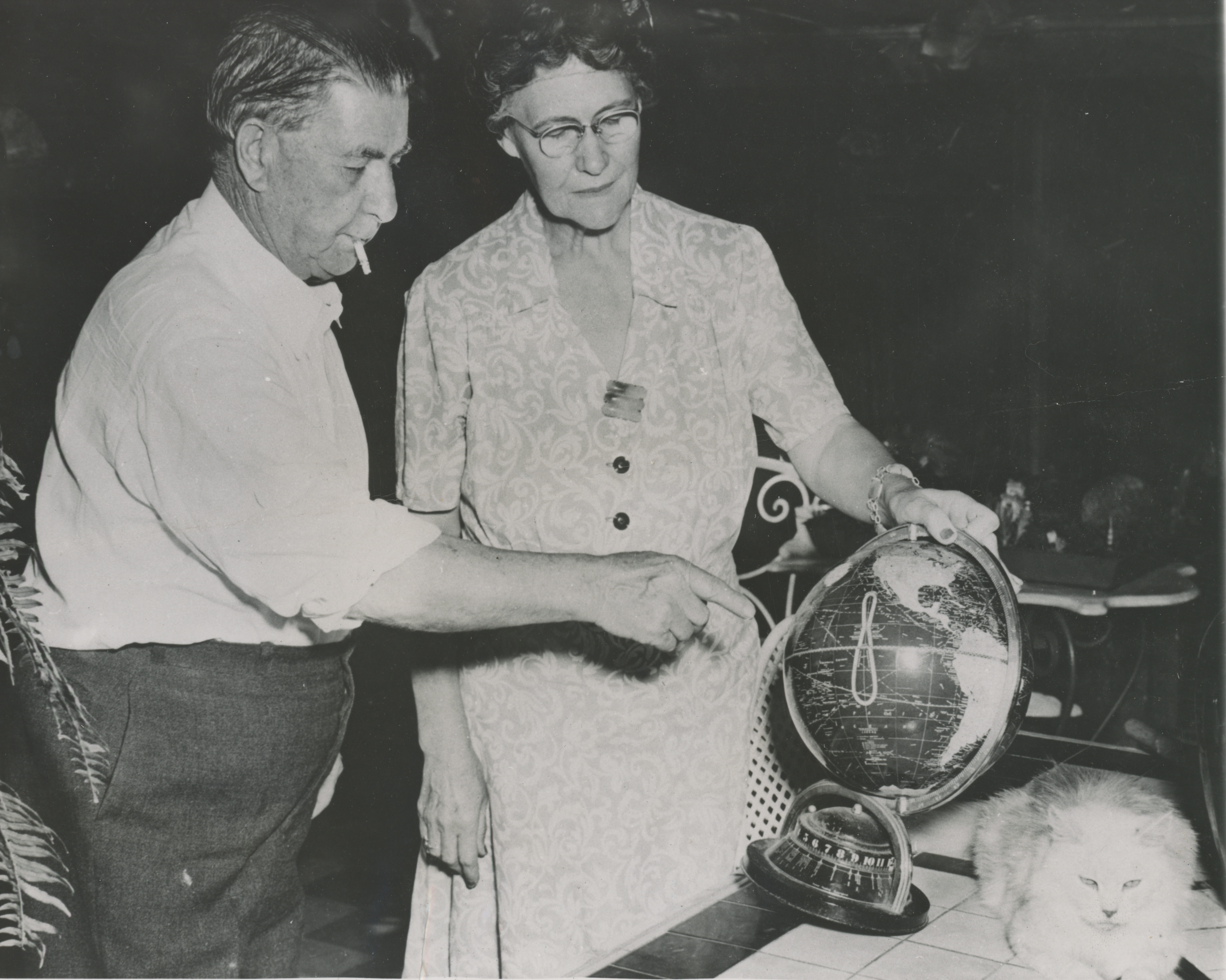
Leslie Fullard-Leo and Ellen Fullard-Leo in 1947, following the United States v. Fullard-Leo case in which the Supreme Court of the United States ruled that they owned the majority of Palmyra Atoll.

Ellen Fullard-Leo and her husband purchased most of Palmyra Atoll from Judge Henry E. Cooper in 1922 for $15,000, obtaining all but two islets. The Fullard-Leos formed the Palmyra Copra Company (Copra Co.), registered in the Territory of Hawaii. Ellen Fullard-Leo was officially the secretary-treasurer. The couple reportedly planned to create a village for writers and artists, although this did not happen. Labor costs made copra farming on the islands unprofitable, and commercial activity then shifted to fishing. During World War II, the atoll was occupied by the American military. Negotiations to lease the island started in 1938, but ended after a 1939 Attorney General opinion suggesting that the islands belonged to the government. The US government argued that it obtained the title to the islands during the 1898 annexation of the Republic of Hawaii. In 1939 Congress authorized the US Navy to construct facilities on the atoll.

During the nine-year legal dispute over the atoll, the US government brought five lawsuits. The dispute ended when the Supreme Court of the United States ruled in favor of the Fullard-Leos in 1947's United States v. Fullard-Leo. In 1948, $100,000 was invested into the atoll.

The Fullard-Leos also reportedly paid taxes to Honolulu from 1922 to 1959 for operations around Kingman Reef, which they also claimed in 1922. Kingman Reef was independently annexed by the US government in 1934.

== Death and legacy ==
Ellen Fullard-Leo moved from her 56-year home in Waikīkī to the quieter Kāhala in 1971, where she raised canaries. She died from cancer at 90, on September 27, 1974, at St. Francis Hospital. Her ashes were scattered from a surfboard near Waikiki.

Fullard-Leo never competed in athletic competitions, stating "I grew up in the Victorian age when it was considered vulgar for young ladies to compete in athletics, so, of course, I didn't compete." She was known for her promotion of amateur athletics, and was behind the first women's swim clubs in Johannesburg and Cape Town in South Africa, Victoria in Canada, and Honolulu in the United States. She also organized life saving courses in these locations. Regarding growing up with 17 brothers, she said "I had to fight for women's rights just to hold my own at the breakfast table." Her work in Hawaii's amateur athletic scene led to her becoming known as "Ma Leo". She was inducted into the Hawaiʻi Sports Hall of Fame and the International Swimming Hall of Fame.

Fullard-Leo's eldest son, Leslie Vincent, became a Hollywood actor before returning to run the family estate. Another son, Dudley Fullard-Leo, established a fund to support students of Punahou School in his mother's name. Her family home in Waikīkī became held by an investment entity controlled by her family, and was later redeveloped into commercial property.

== See also ==
- List of members of the International Swimming Hall of Fame
