= Marc Tedeschi =

American martial artist and writer (born 1956)

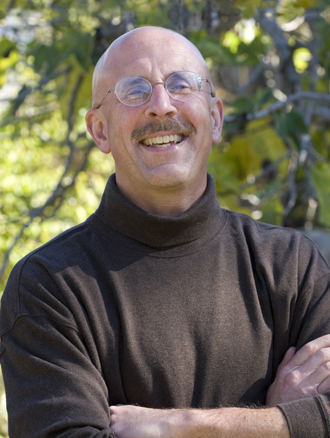
- Tedeschi in 2004
- Born: May 28, 1956 (age 70); Flemington, New Jersey, US
- Education: A.A.S. – Rochester Institute of Technology; B.F.A. – Kansas City Art Institute
- Occupations: Martial artist, designer, photographer, writer
- Style: Hapkido, Taekwondo, Small Circle Jujitsu, Judo, Isshin-ryū
- Website: marctedeschi.com

Marc Tedeschi (born May 28, 1956) is an American martial arts master, designer, photographer, educator, and writer. He has authored and designed more than twenty books on the martial arts and Eastern medicine. His books have been translated into French, Italian, Spanish, and Russian.

== Life and education ==
Tedeschi was born in Flemington, New Jersey, and graduated from Hunterdon Central Regional High School in 1974. He holds an AAS degree in Photography from the Rochester Institute of Technology (1976) and a BFA degree in design from the Kansas City Art Institute (1981), and formerly taught design at the Academy of Art University and the University of San Francisco, from 1988 to 1997.

Tedeschi began studying martial arts in 1974 under Joseph Jennings, a prominent Isshin-ryū Karate practitioner, while he was a student at the Rochester Institute of Technology. He moved to San Francisco in 1981, where he later trained extensively in Hapkido, Taekwondo, Jujutsu, and Judo. His primary martial arts teachers were Merrill Jung, the Hapkido and Taekwondo master and Wally Jay. Tedeschi was a 7th degree black belt in Hapkido before founding his own style of Hapkido in 2007.

== Notable work ==
His book Hapkido: Traditions, Philosophy, Technique about 2000 techniques in 1136 pages with more than 9000 photographs, has been referred to as the most comprehensive text on a single martial art ever published. Tedeschi is also the founder of Hapkido West, a California-based nonprofit organization dedicated to the art of Hapkido and a style of Hapkido he established in 2007.

== Early career ==
Tedeschi began his professional arts career in 1973 as a freelance photographer for The New York Times and other smaller publications. Later, he was also a designer for various firms, including HNTB Architects in Kansas City and Landor Associates in San Francisco.

He was active as a professional designer and photographer from 1973 to 2000. He has received numerous awards for creativity. His work has been published internationally by the American Institute of Graphic Arts, IDEA アイデア (magazine), Communication Arts, Print , Art Direction (magazine), I.D. (The Magazine of International Design), Type Directors Club Annual, American Corporate Identity, World Trademarks and Logotypes 2, Graphic Design USA, The New York Times, as well as a variety of newspapers and trade magazines. In 1985, he was included in I.D. magazine's “The Best Design in America” issue. His work is also included in the Library of Congress, and in the Smithsonian Institution, as part of the Landor Design Collection at the National Museum of American History.

== Publications ==
=== Books ===
- Hapkido: Traditions, Philosophy, Technique. New York: Weatherhill, 2000. LCCN 00-59422; ISBN 978-0834804449.
- Hapkido: An Introduction to the Art of Self-Defense. New York: Weatherhill, 2001. LCCN 2001-26091; ISBN 0-8348-0483-2, ISBN 978-1891640803.
- Essential Anatomy For Healing & Martial Arts. New York: Weatherhill, 2000. LCCN 99-86253; ISBN 0-8348-0443-3, ISBN 978-1953225184.
- The Art of Striking: Principles & Techniques. New York: Weatherhill, 2002. LCCN 2001-45438; ISBN 0-8348-0495-6 (hardcover), ISBN 978-1891640773 (softcover).
- The Art of Holding: Principles & Techniques. New York: Weatherhill, 2001. LCCN 2001-26247; ISBN 0-8348-0491-3 (hardcover), ISBN 978-1891640766 (softcover).
- The Art of Throwing: Principles & Techniques. New York: Weatherhill, 2001. LCCN 2001-33321; ISBN 0-8348-0490-5 (hardcover), ISBN 978-1891640780 (softcover).
- The Art of Ground Fighting: Principles & Techniques. New York: Weatherhill, 2002. LCCN 2001-45532; ISBN 0-8348-0496-4 (hardcover), ISBN 978-1891640759 (softcover).
- The Art of Weapons: Armed and Unarmed Self-Defense. New York: Weatherhill, 2003. LCCN 2003-53820; ISBN 0-8348-0540-5 (hardcover), ISBN 978-1891640797 (softcover).
- Taekwondo: Traditions, Philosophy, Technique. New York: Weatherhill, 2003. LCCN 2002-35280; ISBN 0-8348-0515-4, ISBN 978-1891640735.
- Taekwondo: The Essential Introduction. New York: Weatherhill, 2003. LCCN 2003-53789; ISBN 0-8348-0537-5, ISBN 978-1891640810.
- Taekwondo: Complete WTF Forms. New York: Weatherhill, 2004. LCCN 2004-43529; ISBN 0-8348-0544-8, ISBN 978-1891640827.
- Taekwondo: Complete ITF Patterns. Warren CT: Floating World Editions, 2015. ISBN 978-1891640834.
- Taekwondo: Reference Material. Warren CT: Floating World Editions, 2015. ISBN 978-1891640742.
- Hapkido: Yellow Belt Requirements. Warren CT: Floating World Editions, 2007. Volume 1 of 9, ISBN 978-1484849453.
- Hapkido: Green Belt Requirements. Warren CT: Floating World Editions, 2007. Volume 2 of 9, ISBN 978-1953225108.
- Hapkido: Blue Belt Requirements. Warren CT: Floating World Editions, 2007. Volume 3 of 9, ISBN 978-1953225115.
- Hapkido: Red Belt Requirements. Warren CT: Floating World Editions, 2007. Volume 4 of 9, ISBN 978-1953225122.
- Hapkido: 1st Degree Black Belt Requirements. Warren CT: Floating World Editions, 2007. Volume 5 of 9, ISBN 978-1953225139.
- Hapkido: 2nd Degree Black Belt Requirements. Warren CT: Floating World Editions, 2007. Volume 6 of 9, ISBN 978-1953225146.
- Hapkido: 3rd Degree Black Belt Requirements. Warren CT: Floating World Editions, 2013. Volume 7 of 9, ISBN 978-1953225153.
- Hapkido: 4th Degree Black Belt Requirements. Warren CT: Floating World Editions, 2013. Volume 8 of 9, ISBN 978-1953225160.
- Hapkido: Promotion Requirements. Warren CT: Floating World Editions, 2007. Volume 9 of 9, ISBN 978-1953225177.

=== Posters ===
- Essential Acupoints Poster. New York: Weatherhill, 2002. (printed in seven colors in a limited edition of 1000 impressions, by Gardner Lithograph in California). ISBN 978-0834805101.

=== Articles ===
- Tedeschi, Marc. “Hapkido’s Defenses Against Multiple Opponents”. Journal of Asian Martial Arts, Volume 9, Number 4, Winter 2000. Santa Fe: Via Media Publishing. pp. 76–101. ISSN 1057-8358.
- Tedeschi, Marc. “Healing the Body, Healing the Mind”. Combat Fitness Magazine, February 2001. Burbank: CFW Publishing Group. pp. 79–83.

=== Publications with contributions by Tedeschi ===
- Dohrenwend, Robert E. “The Walking Stick: The Gentleman’s Weapon”. Journal of Asian Martial Arts, Volume 14, Number 4, Winter 2005. Santa Fe: Via Media Publishing. p. 14. ISSN 1057-8358.
- Dohrenwend, Robert E. Dohrenwend's Masterwork: On the Spear, Sling, Sai, and Walking Stick. Santa Fe: Via Media Publishing, 2015. ISBN 978-1893765207.
- Foundations of Korean Martial Arts: Masters, Manuals and Combative Techniques. Compiled by Michael A. DeMarco. Santa Fe: Via Media Publishing, 2017. pp. 88–133. ISBN 978-1893765436.
- Professor Wally Jay's 90th Birthday Tribute: World Class Instructors Seminar and Demonstrations. 2008. DVD (two-disc set; Disc 2 includes demonstrations by more than twenty notable martial artists from various styles, including “Marc Tedeschi - Hapkido”). Directed by Wally Jay and Leon Jay, 1 hour and 50 minutes. Fremont, CA: TC Media (Tiger Claw). ASIN B001W3MTIA.
- Takenobu Igarashi. World Trademarks and Logotypes II. Tokyo: Graphic-Sha Publishing Company, 1987. pp. 122–124. ISBN 978-4766104394.
- Carter, David E. American Corporate Identity: The State of the Art in the 80s. New York: Art Direction Book Company, 1986. ISBN 978-0881080261.
- Barron, Don (Editor). Creativity 15: A Photographic Review. New York: Art Direction Book Company, 1986. "A complete pictoral record of Creativity ’85, a show sponsored, judged, and exhibited by Art Direction Magazine" ISBN 978-0881080254.
- Barron, Don (Editor). Creativity 16: A Photographic Review. New York: Art Direction Book Company, 1987. "A complete pictoral record of Creativity ’86, a show sponsored, judged, and exhibited by Art Direction Magazine" ISBN 978-0881080407.
- Typography 4: Annual Type Directors Club Exhibition for 1982. New York : Watson-Guptill Publications, 1982. p. 145. ISBN 0823055388.
- IDEA アイデア (magazine). Vol. 32, No.186, September 1984. Tokyo: Seibundo Shinkosha Publishing. pp. 104–114. ISSN 1057-8358.
- Communication Arts: CA85 Design Annual. Vol. 27, No. 7, November 1985. ISSN 0010-3519. ASIN B00534M06A.
- ID: The Magazine of International Design — 1985 Annual Design Review — The Best Design in America. July/August 1985. p. 53. ISSN 0019-1299.
- Print Magazine: Print's Regional Design Annual 1983. July/August 1983. #175. ISSN 0032-8510.
- Print Magazine: Print's Regional Design Annual 1986. July/August 1986. pp. 266–267. ISSN 0032-8510.
- 8th Annual Desi Awards 1985 — Graphic Design USA (Exhibition Catalogue). New York: Graphic Design USA, 1985.
- California Design 2 Exhibition. Los Angeles: American Institute of Graphic Arts, 1985.
