= Hirashima =

Hirashima (平島) is a Japanese surname. Notable people with the surname include:

- Hiroto Hirashima (1910–2007), Japanese-American bowler and activist
- Eiko Hirashima (平島 栄子, born 1950), Japanese gymnast
- Hisateru Hirashima (平島 久照, born 1983), Japanese rugby union player

== See also ==
- Hirajima, a surname written with the same characters
- Hirashima-class minelayer, a class of Japanese naval vessels used during World War II
- Tairajima, an island in Kagoshima Prefecture whose name is written with the same characters
