= Danny Yamashiro =

American author, lecturer, clergyman, radio and podcast host (born 1967)

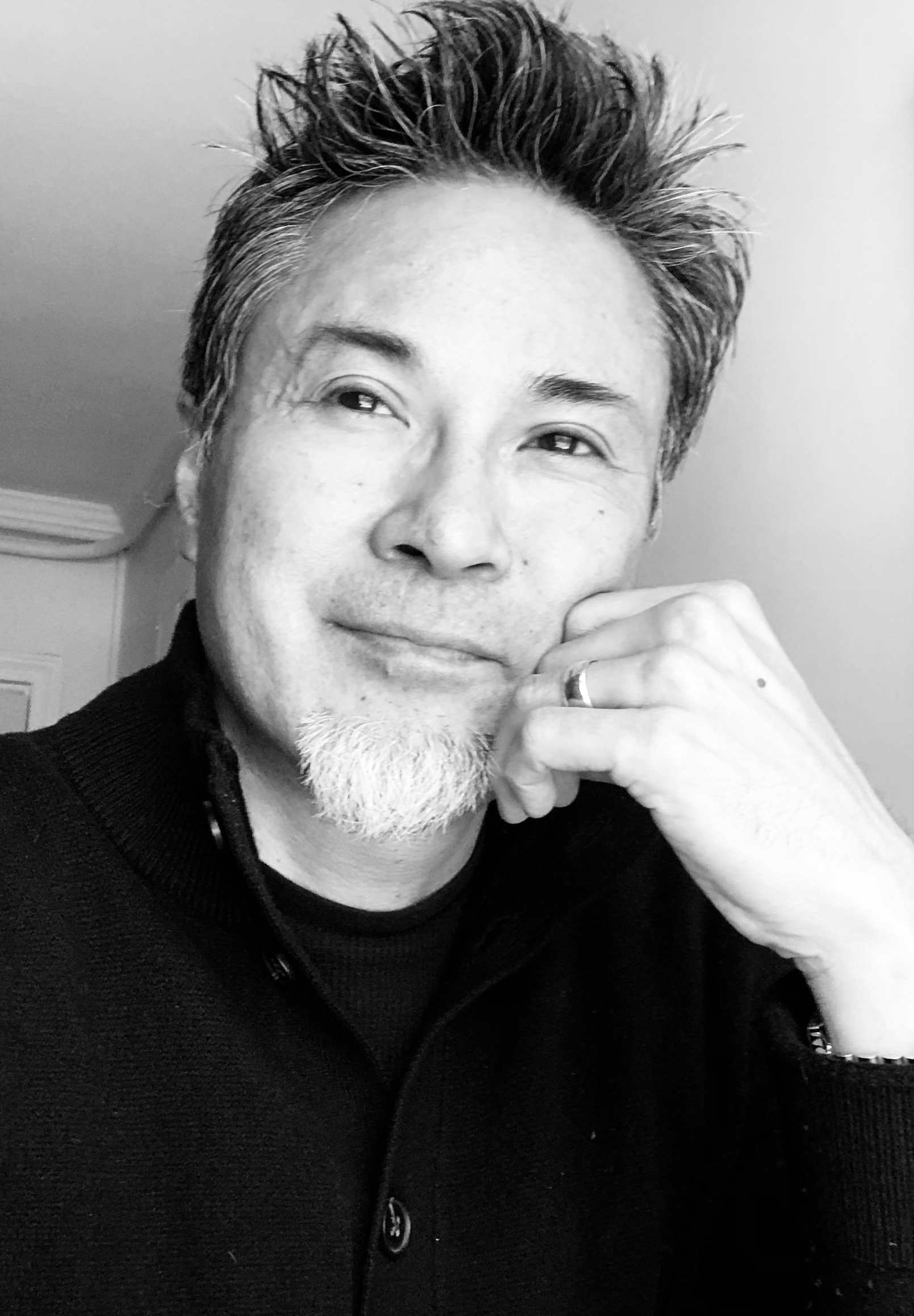
- Yamashiro in Brookline, MA, 2021
- Born: December 5, 1967 (age 58); Honolulu, Hawaii, U.S.
- Education: Biola University (BA, MA); Harvard University (ALM); Trinity International University (PhD)
- Occupations: Researcher, chaplain, novelist, podcaster, evangelist
- Spouse: Jamie Yamashiro (m. 1993)
- Children: 3
- Website: dkyamashiro.com

Daniel Keauhou Matsu Yamashiro (/ˈkeɪˈaʊhoʊ/ kay-ow-hoh; born December 5, 1967) is an American author, guest lecturer at Harvard, a chaplain at MIT, researcher, clergyman, and podcast host who survived a 400-foot (120-meter) fall from the Nuʻuanu Pali ridge in Honolulu, Hawaii, at 18. He is the first scholar to present aggregate data on childhood trauma as it relates to American presidents. Yamashiro also produced the first comprehensive study on American presidents that investigates the influence of religious development from a lens of trauma.

== Early life ==
Danny Yamashiro was born in Honolulu, Hawaii to Evangeline (née Lee Kwai) and David T. Yamashiro Sr. His father was influenced by Father Kenneth A. Bray, a noted sports hero in the islands. Yamashiro had "a lonely childhood" as the youngest of four children in Moanalua, a residential area nestled between Fort Shafter and Tripler Army Medical Center. An American of Hawaiian, Okinawan, and Chinese ancestry, he is the great-grandson of Honolulu detective Chang Apana, inspiration of the Hollywood character Charlie Chan by Earl Derr Biggers. Yamashiro graduated from Iolani School, an institution affiliated with the Episcopal Church of the United States, in 1986.

== Education ==
Yamashiro matriculated at Harvard Extension School and earned a Master of Liberal Arts degree with a concentration in Government from Harvard University. He graduated on May 25, 2017, at Harvard's 366th commencement. An interview by Harvard described Yamashiro's journey to Cambridge from Honolulu. His thesis, Religious Influences on Crisis Presidential Decision-Making: A New Belief in the Operational Code Analysis of George W. Bush (2017), under the direction of David F. Holland from Harvard Divinity School, was featured at Harvard's annual ALM Thesis Symposium.

He attended the University of Oxford Theology Summer School at Christ Church, Oxford, England (2018, 2019), conducted research at ten presidential library archives (NARA), and earned his Doctor of Philosophy from Trinity Evangelical Divinity School of Trinity International University in Deerfield, Illinois (2020) under the guidance of Donald C. Guthrie. His dissertation is titled, American Presidents and Childhood Trauma: Intersecting Religious Education from Franklin Roosevelt to Donald Trump.

Yamashiro studied at Chaminade University (1987) in Honolulu, Hawaii, before transferring to Biola University and Talbot School of Theology in La Mirada, California, where he earned his Bachelor of Arts in Biblical Studies and Theology (1991) and Master of Arts in Bible Exposition (1993). His thesis, Jesus Christ in Every Biblical Book (1992), directed by A. Boyd Luter, explored types, symbols, prophecies and pictures of Christ in all 66 books of the Bible.

== Career ==
=== Novelist ===
Anela's Club by D. K. Yamashiro was published by Koehler Books in 2024. In 2025, the novel was named winner for Young Adult Fiction by the American Writing Awards.

=== Chaplain ===
In 2021, Danny Yamashiro became a chaplain at Massachusetts Institute of Technology (MIT). He is also co-chairperson of the Cambridge Roundtable on Science and Religion. The John Templeton Foundation sponsored program hosts meals each semester at the Harvard Faculty Club for MIT and Harvard faculty and colleagues from nearby schools and colleges to discuss topics on science, philosophy, and religion.

=== Researcher ===
Yamashiro's scholarly work on American presidents and childhood trauma uses an interdisciplinary approach in the social sciences that involves educational psychology, presidential history, and religious education in exploring influences on children's developmental trajectory toward leadership formation. His investigations are theoretically grounded in the writings of Lev Vygotsky. American presidents in his research sample include Franklin D. Roosevelt, Harry S. Truman, Dwight D. Eisenhower, John F. Kennedy, Richard Nixon, Jimmy Carter, Ronald Reagan, George H. W. Bush, Bill Clinton, George W. Bush, Barack Obama, and Donald Trump. Yamashiro's earlier research in religious influences on presidential decision-making was built on the work of Herbert A. Simon, Albert Bandura, and Nathan Leites.

=== Radio and podcast host ===
In 2022, Yamashiro began hosting the talk show The Good Life with Dr. Danny weekdays on WEZE and WROL, two Christian stations in Boston that are owned by Salem Communications reaching New England. His podcasts are heard on major podcast platforms. Yamashiro also hosts A Slice of The Good Life which airs daily throughout the United States, internationally in Ontario, Canada; Kent, England; and Malaybalay City, Philippines and formerly aired in Greater Los Angeles on Salem Communications 99.5 KKLA-FM. Since 2008 Yamashiro has hosted Hawaii's only locally based daily Christian radio talk show, The Good Life Hawaii, on Salem Communications 99.5 KGU-FM,

=== Evangelist and pastor ===
In 1993, he founded Jesus Christ Is Calling You Evangelistic Ministry, Inc. (JCCY) and launched a series of large-scale revival tent meetings throughout Hawaii. Since 1998, his organization formed Paradise Global Mission and expanded to reach several countries worldwide with medical and dental clinics, sports clinics and numerous forms of humanitarian aid by supporting the work of Christian churches in rural locations.

He was the founding pastor of Christ's Church at Kapolei, affiliated with the Evangelical Free Church of America, and served as senior pastor for nine years (1998–2007).

Danny Yamashiro speaking

=== Awards and associations ===
Yamashiro won the Harvard Extension School Commencement Speaker Prize (2017). He was awarded Biola University's Young Alumni Award (2000) and has received numerous certificates of recognition from the Hawaii Senate, Hawaii House of Representatives, Honolulu City Council and the Mayor of Honolulu, Jeremy Harris. Yamashiro was selected for the Pacific Century Fellows and offered a prayer at a celebratory dinner hosted by the Governor of Hawaii, Benjamin Cayetano at the historic "Washington Place" (1999).

Danny Yamashiro is ordained by the Evangelical Free Church of America.

== Personal life ==
Yamashiro is married to Jamie (née Tokuda) Yamashiro. They have three children: Allie, Hugh and Luke.

On December 22, 1985, while attempting to rescue his stranded girlfriend from a 20-foot (6.1-meter) mountain-climbing fall, Yamashiro slipped and fell head first 300 feet (91 meters) and later another 100 feet (30 meters). The second fall took place during a rescue effort and was captured on film. It aired on newscasts throughout Hawaii. He suffered severe head injuries, skull fractures, multiple tears in his scalp, a shattered ankle, damaged organs, extensive lacerations, and became comatose.

On May 25, 2017, Yamashiro delivered Harvard Extension School's commencement address, titled "Falling 400 Feet."

== Works ==
=== Books ===
Yamashiro has authored the following books:

- Yamashiro, Danny (1997). Paradise Calls: Spellbinding Story of Hawaii's Evangelist. Jesus Christ Is Calling You, Inc. ISBN 1-890312-00-2.
- Yamashiro, Danny (1998). Know Your Future Today. Jesus Christ Is Calling You, Inc. ISBN 1-890312-01-0.
- Yamashiro, Danny (2000). Spiritual Reshaping of a Christian Hawaii. Keauhou Press. ISBN 1-890312-02-9.
- Yamashiro, Danny (2003). The Good Life: Encouragement You Need When You Need It. Kerygma Publishing. ISBN 1-890312-05-3.
- Yamashiro, Danny (2004). Building Blocks for Better Living. Kerygma Publishing. ISBN 1-890312-06-1.
- Yamashiro, Danny (2007). Discover the Champion in You. Kerygma Publishing. ISBN 978-1890312-04-6.
- Yamashiro, Danny (2008). Successful Evangelism 100% of the Time. Kerygma Publishing. ISBN 978-0-9815219-0-9.
- Yamashiro, Danny (2011). Paradise Calls: A Spellbinding Story of Survival and Hope from Hawaii's Evangelist. White Mountain Castle Publishing, LLC. ISBN 978-0-9815219-3-0.
- Yamashiro, Danny (2012). Winner's Edge. White Mountain Castle Publishing, LLC. ISBN 978-0-9847027-0-1.
- Yamashiro, Danny (2015). Unleashing The Greatness in You. White Mountain Castle Publishing, LLC. ISBN 978-0-9863555-0-9.
- Yamashiro, D. K. (2024). Anela's Club. Koehler Books. ISBN 979-8-88824-222-3.

=== Theses ===
- Yamashiro, Daniel K. M. (1992). Jesus Christ in Every Biblical Book (MA thesis). La Mirada: Biola University.
- Yamashiro, Daniel K. M. (2017). Religious Influences on Crisis Presidential Decision-Making: A New Belief in the Operational Code Analysis of George W. Bush (ALM thesis). Cambridge: Harvard University.
- Yamashiro, Daniel K. M. (2020). American Presidents and Childhood Trauma: Intersecting Religious Education from Franklin Roosevelt to Donald Trump (PhD thesis). Deerfield: Trinity International University.

=== Academic Articles ===
- Yamashiro, Daniel K. M. (November 2023). "American President's Perception of Childhood Trauma at the Intersection of Religious Education Through the Refracting Prism of Vygotsky's Perezhivanie". Social Science Research Network. doi:10.2139/ssrn.4629661.
- Yamashiro, Daniel K. M. (September 2024). "Vygotsky's Perezhivanie as a Theoretical Prism to Explore Childhood Trauma at the Intersection of Religious Education of American Presidents". Social Science Research Network. doi:10.2139/ssrn.4922012.
- Yamashiro, Daniel K. M. (October 2024). "Bill Clinton: How Childhood Trauma at the Intersection of Religion Influenced His Formation as American President". Social Science Research Network. doi:10.2139/ssrn.4967542.
- Yamashiro, Daniel K. M. (October 2024). "Donald Trump: How Childhood Trauma and a Religious Mentor Influenced His Formation as American President". Social Science Research Network. doi:10.2139/ssrn.4971754.
- Yamashiro, Daniel K. M. (December 2024). "How Barack Obama's Childhood Trauma and Religious Experiences Influenced His Formation as President". Social Science Research Network. doi:10.2139/ssrn.4989658.
- Yamashiro, Daniel K. M. (April 2025). "How Ronald Reagan's Childhood Trauma and Religious Experiences Influenced His Formation as President". Social Science Research Network. doi:10.2139/ssrn.5122872.
