= Siegfried Kufferath =

German-Japanese American martial artist and Danzan-ryū jujutsu professor (1911–1999)

- Born: Siegfried Kufferath; February 16, 1911; Honolulu, Hawaii, U.S.
- Died: May 7, 1999 (aged 88); Santa Clara, California, U.S.
- Other names: Sig Kufferath; “Pippet”
- Nationality: American
- Style: Danzan-ryū jujutsu
- Teacher: Henry Seishiro Okazaki
- Rank: 10th dan (Danzan-ryū jujutsu); 2nd dan (Kodokan Judo); 2nd dan (Aikido)

Other information
- Occupation: Auditor; martial arts instructor; physical therapist
- Notable students: Tony Janovich, Richard Bunch, Joe Holck

Siegfried “Sig” Kufferath (February 16, 1911 – May 7, 1999), also known by the nickname “Pippet”, was an American martial artist and instructor who succeeded Henry Seishiro Okazaki as head of Danzan-ryū jujutsu in the United States. A senior student of Okazaki, he served as chief instructor of the Kodenkan dojo in Honolulu and was elected by the board of the American Jujitsu Institute (AJI) in 1953 to succeed Okazaki as Professor and head of the organization.

== Early life ==
Kufferath was born in Honolulu, Hawaii, on February 16, 1911. He was one of eleven children of C. Th. Kufferath, a German diplomat who served at the German Consulate in Tokyo for 26 years, and Shin Hori Kufferath, who was Japanese. Family accounts state that as many as eleven languages were spoken in the household.

He attended McKinley High School and the University of Hawaiʻi, where he competed in track and field. He became a three-time Hawaiian Amateur Athletic Union champion in the 440-yard event during the late 1920s and early 1930s. Kufferath later worked as an auditor for the City and County of Honolulu before moving to California.

== Martial arts career ==
=== Danzan-ryū training ===
In 1937, Kufferath began studying Danzan-ryū jujutsu under its founder, Henry Seishiro Okazaki, at the Kodenkan dojo in Honolulu. Fluent in Japanese, he was taught the system directly in Japanese and trained six days a week.

Kufferath received his first-degree black belt and a Mokuroku (teacher's scroll) in May 1941. By 1942, he was teaching at the Kodenkan and Kaheka Lane dojos, with Bing-Fai Lau and Esther Azumi. In February 1948, he completed Okazaki's special course for black-belt instructors, receiving a Kaidensho (certificate of full mastery) and the title of Shihan.

=== Military service and restorative therapy ===
Kufferath graduated in 1943 from Okazaki's Nikko Restoration Sanatorium course in seifukujutsu, a Japanese restorative-therapy tradition. He accompanied Okazaki on medical house calls and later maintained a physical-therapy practice in California.

In April 1944, Kufferath was inducted into the United States Army. According to biographical accounts, he defeated a hand-to-hand-combat instructor during basic training and was subsequently assigned to Special Services, where he taught hand-to-hand combat to military personnel in Hawaii. He was honorably discharged as a technical sergeant in 1946.

=== Succession to Okazaki ===
Following Okazaki's death in 1951, Kufferath was promoted to Shichidan (seventh dan) and named Professor by the AJI. On October 6, 1953, the AJI board of directors formally elected him to succeed Okazaki as Professor and head of Danzan-ryū jujutsu within the organization.

Kufferath also trained in other Japanese martial arts, receiving a second dan in Kodokan Judo in 1956 and a second dan in Aikido in 1965.

=== California years ===
Kufferath moved to California in 1957 and settled in San Jose. He taught at the Pacific Judo Academy and through the Los Altos Parks and Recreation Department before becoming chief instructor of the Nikko Jujitsu School in Mountain View, in 1964. The school had been founded by Ed Dressen.

Around 1966, Kufferath shared dojo space in the Jurian Building on Castro Street in Mountain View with aikido instructor Robert Nadeau. Their cooperation was described as a factor in the development of regular contact between local aikido and jujutsu practitioners and in the later formation of the California Aikido Association.

In 1973, Kufferath and his student Tony Janovich opened the Kodenkan Jujitsu School in Santa Clara. During the late 1970s, they began offering Restoration Therapy certification courses to the public; the programme continued for 18 years.

Kufferath joined the American Judo & Jujitsu Federation (AJJF) in 1983, and the organization formally recognised him as Shihan in 1988. In 1993, Kufferath and Janovich revived Okazaki's 1948 masterclass structure under the name Kodenkan Jujitsu Okugi, intended to transmit the historical curriculum to later generations of black belts.

He was a founding member of the Kodenkan Danzan Ryu Jujitsu Association and the Kilohana Martial Arts Association, a nonprofit founded in 1996 to perpetuate the teachings of Kufferath and Okazaki. In later life, he received several tenth-dan honours from martial-arts organizations in the United States and abroad.

== Death ==
Kufferath died in Santa Clara, California, on May 7, 1999, aged 88.
