= Willy Cahill =

American martial arts coach (born 1935)

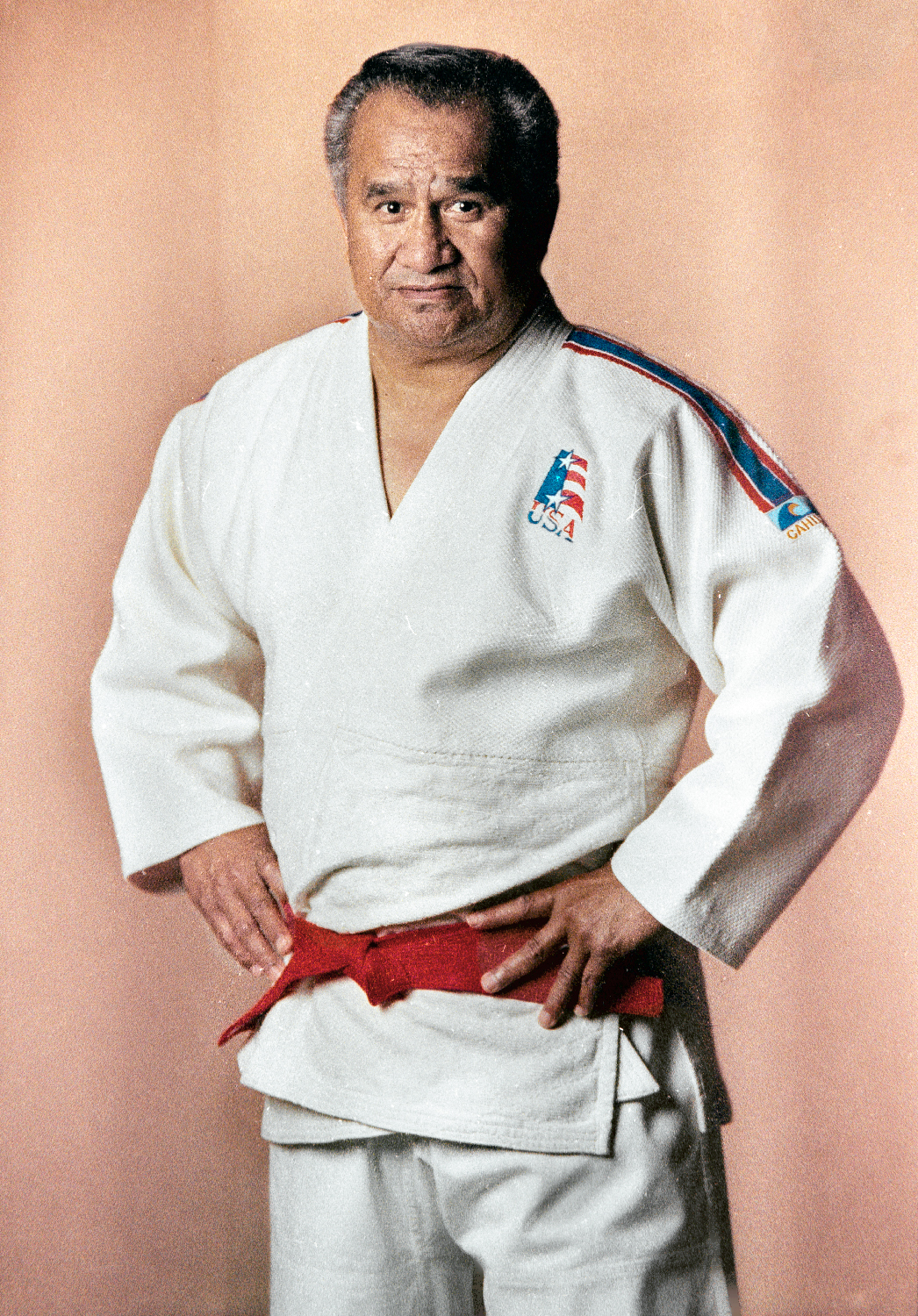
- Born: November 21, 1936 (age 89)

Willy "Clipper" Cahill (born November 21, 1935) is an American Kudan (ninth degree) Black belt in Kodokan Judo, US Olympic and Paralympic Judo Coach, a Co-Founder of the US Blind Judo Foundation and a Judan (tenth degree) Black belt in Kodenkan Jujitsu.

== Biography ==
Willy "Clipper" Cahill was born in Honolulu, Hawaii, on November 21, 1935, to Abbie and John Cahill. When Willy was born, his father saw a Clipper airplane fly overhead and nicknamed him "Clipper". Willy’s father John Cahill was an instructor studying and working with Danzan Ryu Jujitsu founder Henry Seishiro Okazaki. When Willy was diagnosed with polio at age 7, professor Seishiro Okazaki, who served as a masseur and a therapist for President Franklin D. Roosevelt, came to help and, in less than a year, put Willy back on his feet. After John Cahill received his black belt in 1938, he opened his own dojo named Hui Miki Miki which means “lots of pep” in Hawaiian. John taught judo and jujitsu to American servicemen stationed on the Islands throughout World War II. The family moved to California in 1947 and John Cahill opened the Hui Miki Miki Judo dojo in Daly City, California in 1948. Shortly after, he moved the school to South San Francisco where he taught for nearly fifteen years. After his father died in 1962, Willy Cahill opened his own Judo Academy in San Bruno in 1963 in his father's honor. On July 19, 2013, USA Judo presented Cahill with a lifetime achievement award.

== Career ==
Cahill is a Judo Professor and a South San Francisco High alumnus. He has been teaching and coaching Judo and Jujitsu for the better part of five decades. His pupils have captured more than 1200 national and international titles. A former judo coach at Stanford and San Francisco State Universities, Cahill was the U.S. Olympic Judo assistant Coach at 1984 Summer Olympics in Los Angeles and at 1988 Summer Olympics in Seoul. He was offered a U.S. Olympic Judo Head Coach position for the 1992 Summer Olympics in Barcelona, but passed the opportunity, as he thought there were better candidates. He also coached the U.S. National Judo team from 1980 to 1990. Cahill became a Northern CA Youth Champion at the age of 16. As a coach, his San Bruno Judo Academy won nine straight California championships in the 1970's. Willy's teams competed in the Olympics, Goodwill Games, World Judo Championships, the Pacific Rim Championships and the Junior Pan American Championships. Professor Cahill mentored and trained athletes such as a 1987 World Judo Championships Silver medalist Lynn Roethke, a 1984 Olympian Brett Barron, a 1984 Olympic Bronze medalist Edward Liddie and a Silver medalist Robert Berland, a 1988 Olympic Silver medalist Kevin Asano and a Bronze medalist and a 1987 World Champion Mike Swain. One of Cahill's students, Corinne Shigemoto, has been named a U.S. Olympic Judo coach.

== Titles and honors ==
- Judo Instructor of the Year, Black Belt Hall of Fame, 1975
- Mentor, U.S. Olympic team 1984, 1988
- Coach, U.S. National team 1980 - 1990
- Judan (highest rank) in Jujitsu, presented by Professor Wally Jay, September 1994, Ohana Convention, Las Vegas
- San Mateo County Sports Hall of Fame, May 25, 1995
- Head coach, Paralympic Judo, Sydney, Australia, November 2000
- United States Ju-Jitsu President's Leadership Award, 2003
- Lifetime Achievement Award, USA Judo, July 19, 2013
- Kudan (9th degree) in Judo, January 2017
- Life Member of United States Ju-Jitsu Federation
