= ʻIolani School =

Prep school in Honolulu, Hawaii, US

Location
- 563 Kamoku Street; Honolulu, Hawaii 96826; United States; 21°17.190′N 157°49.474′W

Information
- Type: Private, independent preparatory school
- Motto: One Team
- Denomination: Episcopal Church
- Patron saints: Kamehameha IV and Queen Emma
- Founded: 1863
- Founder: Kamehameha IV
- CEEB code: 120040
- NCES School ID: 00326634
- Head of school: Melanie K. Pfingsten (interim)
- Teaching staff: 162.8 (FTE)
- Grades: K-12
- Gender: Co-ed
- Enrollment: 2,200 (2025-26)
- Student to teacher ratio: 10-1
- Hours in school day: 7.3
- Campuses: Lower School (K-6), Upper School (7-12)
- Campus type: Large city
- Colors: Red, Black and White
- Athletics conference: Interscholastic League of Honolulu
- Mascot: ʻIo (Hawaiian Hawk)
- Nickname: Raiders
- Accreditation: Western Association of Schools and Colleges
- Newspaper: Imua ʻIolani
- Yearbook: Ka Moʻolelo O ʻIolani
- Distinctions: 4th largest independent school in the United States
- Website: www.iolani.org

ʻIolani School is a private coeducational K-12 college preparatory school in Honolulu, Hawaiʻi. It serves more than 2,200 students with a boarding program for grades 9-12. ʻIolani was founded in 1863 by Father William R. Scott, it was the principal school of the former Anglican Church of Hawaiʻi. It was patronized by Kamehameha IV and Queen Emma who gave the school its name in 1870. ʻIolani in the Hawaiian language means "heavenly hawk". Today, ʻIolani School is affiliated with the Episcopal Church in the United States. It is administered by a Board of Governors and is one of the largest independent schools in the United States.

== History ==
=== Early years ===
On October 11, 1862, Thomas Nettleship Staley arrived in Hawaiʻi by request of Kamehameha IV and Queen Victoria of the United Kingdom. The following year Kamehameha IV, a member of the Church of England, established the Hawaiian Reformed Catholic Church, also known as the Anglican Church of Hawaiʻi. The school was originally named Saint Alban's College.

In 1863, Staley's companion Father Scott purchased land in Lāhaina and established Luaʻehu School, a school for boys. When Father Scott fell ill and returned to Britain, Father George Mason was summoned by Staley to administer the school on Maui. On January 12, 1863, the college was also established in the Pauoa Valley in Honolulu. Before Staley, too, left the islands for Britain in 1870, Father Mason merged the two schools and relocated it to the St. Alban's campus. Later Bishop Alfred Willis purchased land on Bates Street in Nuʻuanu Valley and moved part of the school there, intending it for students of full or part Hawaiian descent, under the new name of ʻIolani College. St. Alban's College, intended for white students, separated and continuing operating at Pauoa until 1887.

With the overthrow of the Kingdom of Hawaiʻi and annexation to the United States in 1898, the Anglican Church of Hawaiʻi became part of the Episcopal Church United States (ECUSA). ʻIolani School was moved to Nuʻuanu, transferred back to downtown Honolulu and then moved to Nuʻuanu a second time. It remained in Nuʻuanu from 1927 to 1953, when it was moved to the present Ala Wai site. The elementary school was moved to the Ala Wai site in 1946.

In 1979, the school became co-educational, ending its all-male enrollment policy.

=== Development ===
ʻIolani School grew and refined its program offerings with a standard college preparatory curriculum as a foundation for every student. Religion, performing and visual arts, music, and athletics became integral parts of the ʻIolani School education. As such, all students in fourth grade must be involved in performing arts.

Returning to its history of being a boarding school, ʻIolani opened its newly constructed Residence Hall for boarding students in February 2019.

== Campus ==
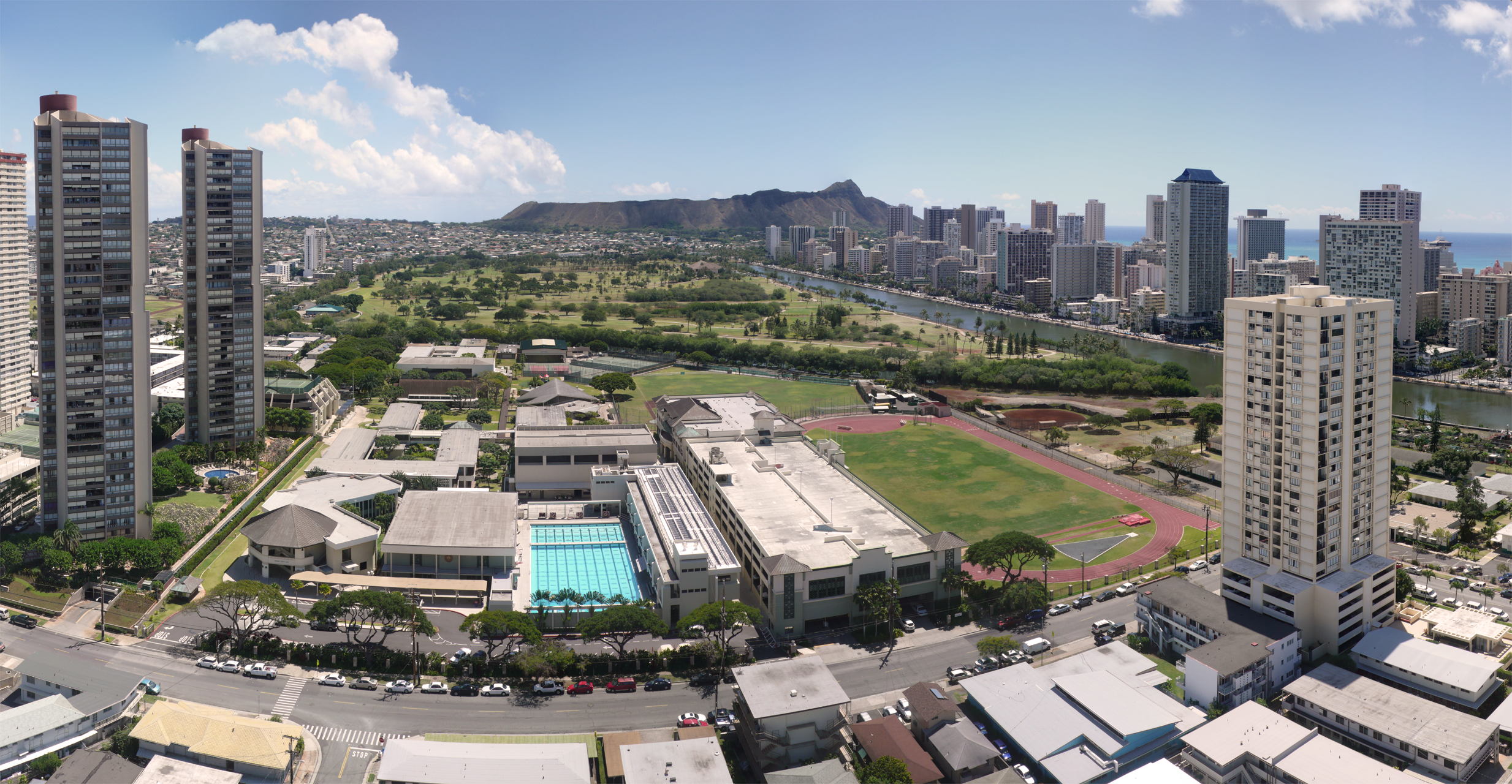
View of ʻIolani Campus with Diamond Head, Ala Wai Canal, Ala Wai Golf Course, and Waikiki in the background (circa March 10, 2010). Note: this photo is missing a number of newly constructed buildings.

The campus is divided into Upper and Lower School. Buildings include the I-Wing, Castle Building, Weinberg Building, the Art Building, Nangaku Building, Sullivan Center for Innovation and Learning, the Arrillaga Student Center, Residence Hall, Kaneshiro Science and Innovation Center, Sidney and Minnie Kosasa Performance Studios and Courtyard, and the Father Bray Athletic Center. Other facilities include St. Alban's Chapel, K-1 Community, Ai Family Learning Center, Upper Gym, Lower Gym, Dillingham Pool, Tsuzuki Group Library and Seto Hall. ʻIolani School also has faculty housing, a football/soccer field (Eddie Hamada Field) with stadium seating (Kozuki Stadium), an all-weather track & field layout (Eddie Hamada Track), a baseball field, an outdoor basketball court (One Team Fieldhouse) and six tennis courts.

=== Upper School ===
The Harold K.L. Castle Building was dedicated in 1980 to the Castle Family which had donated land to ʻIolani School. The Castle Building also contains most classrooms for the 7th and 8th Grade. Orchestra and Choir also use this building for their Performing Arts classes for both Upper and Lower School students.

The Sullivan Center for Innovation and Leadership was finished at the end of 2012 for the replacement of the Upper School Library. The Sullivan Center was created to emphasize sustainability and includes classrooms, laboratories, an auditorium, and a garden among other facilities.

In late 2023, plans for a new Student Center were revealed, following a $10 million donation from parents Justine Stamen Arrillaga and John Arrillaga Jr. (son of John Arrillaga). The project is completed as of January 20, 2026.

=== Lower School ===
The Kaneshiro Science and Innovation Center and the Sidney and Minnie Kosasa Performance Studios and Courtyard were both opened for the 2019 school year. These state-of-the-art and eco-conscious facilities allow the K-1 community at ʻIolani School to embrace their creativity with the aid of a number of decorations created in the school's Sullivan Center for Innovation and Leadership. An interactive organ was installed as well.

== Athletics ==
ʻIolani School's athletic program was founded in 1932 by Father Kenneth A. Bray. Over 900, or 70%, of the student body, participates in one of over 32 competitive sports. ʻIolani School is a member of the Interscholastic League of Honolulu, an athletic conference composed of Honolulu-area private schools.

Since the formation of the Hawaii High School Athletic Association, ʻIolani has won over 75 state championships in various sports. It is the only school in Hawaiʻi to have won five consecutive state championships in Boys Basketball from 2002 to 2006. ʻIolani has the most consecutive state championships in Boys Wrestling, and is the first ILH school to win a Girls Wrestling State Championship in 2005. They also have eight consecutive D-II football titles, highest in the nation.

== Curriculum ==
ʻIolani School's campus is divided into two sections: Lower School and Upper School. Lower School is for elementary students, kindergarten through 6th grade. Upper School is 7th through 12th grade. The daily schedule has six periods that rotate weekly.

For the Lower School, students in kindergarten through 3rd grade are given courses in language arts, mathematics, science, social studies, and special courses. From 4th-6th grade, students are given the same courses as earlier grades, with the addition of performance arts classes. This includes various classes in music and performing arts, including jazz dance, hula, musical theater, and orchestra. Special classes include religion, music, physical education, and library.

For the Upper School, the school requires four classes each semester, excluding art, physical education, and music classes. To graduate, the school requires a total of 18.5 credits. These credits include four years of English, three years of the same foreign language, three years of mathematics, three years of history, three years of science, and an unspecified amount of required art, guidance, religion and other elective courses. The school offers 27 AP classes, including courses in English, Mathematics, and History.

=== Summer school ===
ʻIolani’s summer school allows students to earn graduation credits; credit courses offered during summer include art, history, science, computers, and language. Courses are offered for both the Lower School and the Upper School. Enrollment is offered to students, international students, and visiting students in both levels, however enrollment to regular students is preferred.

=== Harold Keables ===
Harold Keables was first a teacher in Denver, where he was named the National Teacher of the Year by Life magazine; in 1965 he started teaching at ʻIolani School. Each year his legacy is honored via the Keables Chair, which brings "outstanding teachers, writers, and artists to ʻIolani."

=== ʻIolani Fair ===
The ʻIolani Fair has been held every year in late April to fundraise for student expenditures. Initially started as the Iolani Fun Festival in 1948, it would later become the Iolani Carnival, and eventually in 1990, the Iolani Fair. Themes for each year were introduced shortly thereafter. The fair typically consists of different sections including food stands, games, rides, a silent auction, a video game center, a white elephant sale, and a marketplace.

== Extracurriculars ==
ʻIolani students are involved in many extracurricular activities from academic to interest-led.

=== Imua ʻIolani ===
Imua ʻIolani is the school news magazine. It is published quarterly, distributed to all students, and is available online. In 2008, Imua ʻIolani was named the best school newspaper in the state.

=== Math Team ===
The ʻIolani math team has been participating in the Oahu Mathematics League since the mid 1970s (the league was started in the 1968–69 school year). The team has won the league championship in 1977, 1981, 1984, 1990, 1991, and from 1993 to the present. This marks 37 total championships, including the past 32 in a row. This streak is the longest state championship streak of any high school competition in Hawaii. The JV team has claimed the top spot ever since the inception of the JV division in the 2000–01 school year. Also, ʻIolani holds the record for placing first 19 times in the Hawaii State Math Bowl (which was started in 1978).

=== Gender-Sexuality Alliance (GSA) ===
ʻIolani School's Gender-Sexuality Alliance strives to promote inclusivity on campus and allow spaces for discussions on contemporary issues such as gender identity, pronouns, and sexuality through student-submitted questions, in addition to ice breakers for members and media with representation LGBTQIA+ individuals. Furthermore, the club provides website resources for students to utilize if necessary. Every year, the club holds its annual No Name-Calling Week in conjunction with the Chapel Council to bring to light the issue of bullying and discrimination, as well as participating and walking in Oʻahu's annual Pride parade.

=== Model United Nations (MUN) ===
Originally the ʻIolani School International Affairs Association, or ISIAA, ʻIolani's Model United Nations club has competed in various conferences since its founding in 2011. With the help of coaching by two advisers and student leadership, the numerous delegates who have joined since the club's founding have competed in a number of conferences, amassing a multitude of awards from different committees. Examples include the annual PacMUN conference, as well as international conferences such as AJMUN and VMUN, in addition to national conferences such as SCVMUN.

=== Surf Team ===
The active participation of ʻIolani's surf team in numerous competitions around the island has yielded great achievements to its members. Members participate in the annual Hawaiʻi Surf Association's yearly competition, participating in both divisions of the shortboard, longboard, and bodyboard events. The team won the state championship in 2024.

=== Chess Team ===
ʻIolani has an active chess team with many individuals winning awards both in Hawaii and in the continental United States. Members compete in the annual Hawaiʻi State Scholastic Championship, recently winning second place in 2025. The organization is led by two coaches, one of whom is a three-time Hawaiʻi State Chess Champion, most recently winning the title in 2025. The ʻIolani chess team captured the first three scholastic championships in Hawaiʻi, beginning in 1997.

== Notable alumni ==
=== Sportspeople ===
- Bern Brostek '85, former professional football player for Los Angeles Rams and St. Louis Rams
- Keoni DeRenne '97, professional baseball coach
- Mike Fetters '83, former Major League Baseball pitcher for California Angels, Milwaukee Brewers, Oakland Athletics, Baltimore Orioles, Los Angeles Dodgers, Pittsburgh Pirates, Arizona Diamondbacks and Minnesota Twins, coach for Diamondbacks
- George Freeth, surfer
- Duke Hashimoto, former professional soccer player with Real Salt Lake in Major League Soccer
- Kila Ka'aihue, Major League Baseball, first baseman for Oakland Athletics
- Morgan Langley '07, professional soccer player with Harrisburg City Islanders in USL Pro
- Derrick Low '04, professional basketball player for Maccabi Haifa team of Israeli Basketball Super League
- Jerry Scanlan, NFL tight end
- Ed Ta'amu, offensive lineman, Arena Football League; fourth round (132nd overall) draft selection of NFL's Minnesota Vikings
- Taylor Takata '00, competed in 2008 Beijing Olympics in judo, taking ninth place
- Hugh Watanabe '17, professional basketball player and Olympian
- Bobby Webster, '02 General Manager for NBA Toronto Raptors
- Brian Ah Yat, professional football quarterback

=== Authors, editors and journalists ===
- Jeff Chang 1985, author of Can't Stop Won't Stop: A History of the Hip-Hop Generation
- Chinyei Kinjo, publisher of the Yōen jihō
- Kanoa Leahey 1995, sportscaster (KHON-TV)
- Ross Mihara 1981, news anchor and sumo commentator for NHK
- Mike Woitalla 1982, sports journalist and executive editor of Soccer America

=== Business ===
- Guy Kawasaki '72, one of original Apple employees responsible for marketing of Macintosh in 1984; CEO and author

=== Clergy ===
- Lani Hanchett '37, first bishop of Hawaiian descent of Episcopal Diocese of Hawaii
- Richard Sui On Chang '59, fourth bishop of Episcopal Diocese of Hawaii

=== Education ===
- Cheryl Hayashi '85, MacArthur Prize winner, Professor of biology at the University of California, Riverside
- Ronald Takaki '57, former Professor of ethnic studies at the University of California, Berkeley
- Michael G. Vann '85, historian of the French Colonial Empire, former President of the French Colonial Historical Society, two time Fulbright scholar, Associate Professor of History, California State University, Sacramento

=== Entertainment ===
- Angela Aki, pop singer-songwriter active in Japan, known in West for song "Kiss Me Good-Bye", theme for video game Final Fantasy XII
- Tonia Ko '06, composer
- Chris Lee '75, former president of production for TriStar Pictures, executive producer of Superman Returns
- Clyde Kusatsu '66, film and television actor
- Danny Yamashiro '86, radio host of The Good Life Hawaii Show, motivational speaker, author and minister
- Grace Nikae, concert pianist
- Kamuela Kahoano '98, singer/songwriter
- Professor Tanaka '49, professional wrestler, actor

=== Notable faculty and coaches ===
- Father Kenneth A. Bray, established "One Team" philosophy of Hawaii's teachers, students and coaches; member of Hawaii Sports Hall of Fame
- Eddie Hamada '46 (1928–2010), teacher, athletic director and football coach (1959–91)
- Dolores Kendrick, second Poet Laureate of the District of Columbia (1967-1968)
- Scott Kim, puzzle designer and video game designer

=== Government ===
==== Monarchial government ====
- Robert Hoapili Baker (attended St. Alban's; 1860s–1870s), governor of Maui, legislator and friend of King Kalākaua
- Curtis P. Iaukea (attended St. Alban's; 1863–1871), Hawaiian courtier, diplomat and official of monarchy, republic and territorial governments
- David Leleo Kinimaka (attended St. Alban's; 1860s–1870s), royal guard captain
- Samuel Nowlein (attended St. Alban's; 1860s–1870s), royal guard captain and revolutionist
- William Pūnohu White (attended St. Alban's; 1860s–1870s), lawyer, police sheriff, legislator of monarchy and territory

==== Territorial government ====
- John H. Wilson (attended St. Alban's; 1885), mayor of Honolulu

==== Federal government ====
- Nani Coloretti '87, Deputy Secretary, U.S. Department of Housing and Urban Development
- Jill Otake '91, U.S. District Court Judge, U.S. District Court for the District of Hawaii
- Stefanie Tompkins, director of DARPA
- Remi Yamamoto '10, senior advisor for communications to the White House Chief of Staff

==== State government ====
- Mufi Hannemann '72, Mayor of Honolulu (2004-2010); President & CEO of Hawaii Lodging and Tourism Association (2011–present)
- Ron Menor, member of Hawaii State Senate
- Antonio Perry, justice of the Supreme Court of Hawaii
- Maile Shimabukuro '88, Democratic member of Hawaii State Senate
- Chris Lee '99, member of Hawaii State House of Representatives (2008–present)
- George W. T. Loo, member of Hawaii State House of Representatives
- Stanley Chang '00, member of Hawaii State Senate

==== International government ====
- Sun Yat-sen 1882, Chinese revolutionary. He is also considered "the father of modern China" in both the People's Republic of China and the Republic of China.

=== Royalty ===
- Prince William Pitt Leleiohoku II (attended St. Alban's; 1860s–1870s), crown prince of Hawaii
- Prince David Kawānanakoa (attended St. Alban's; 1874), patriarch of the House of Kawananakoa, in the line of succession for the Kingdom of Hawaii; a founder of the Democratic Party in Hawaii
- Prince Jonah Kūhiō Kalanianaʻole (attended St. Alban's; 1870s), a ten-term congressional delegate
- Prince Edward Abnel Keliʻiahonui (attended St. Alban's; 1870s)

=== Other ===
- Kirk Cashmere, civil rights attorney
- Jaime Green '95, First Lady of Hawaii
- Chelsea Hardin, Miss Hawaii USA 2016 and first runner-up at Miss USA 2016
- Robynne Maii, chef
