= Hawaiʻi Sports Hall of Fame =

American sports hall of fame in Honolulu, Oʻahu, Hawaiʻi

- Established: 1997
- Location: Bishop Museum, 1525 Bernice Street, Honolulu, Hawaii
- Coordinates: 21.3329195°N 157.8728014°W
- Type: Sports hall of fame
- Website: hawaiisportshalloffame.com

The Hawaiʻi Sports Hall of Fame is a sports hall of fame and museum in the U.S. state of Hawaiʻi. According to the hall's official website, it serves as the "state museum for sports history in the islands," and "is best described as an educational repository created to enshrine athletes, pioneers and contributors of Hawaiʻi's rich sports history." The organization was founded in 1997 and a selection committee meets once a year in December. The flagship exhibition for the hall is located in the Bishop Museum in Honolulu.

The 2016 class, inducted in May 2016, included water polo player Brandon Brooks, decathlete Bryan Clay, soccer player Brian Ching, and brothers Maʻake Kemoeatu and Chris Kemoeatu for American football.

== Inductees ==
=== Auto racing ===
- Roland Leong
- Danny Ongais

=== Baseball ===
- 2005 Little League World Series Championship Team
- J. Ashman Beaven
- Alexander Cartwright
- Sid Fernandez
- Hank Hughes
- Mike Lum
- Les Murakami
- Steere Noda
- Lenn Sakata
- Derek Tatsuno
- Shane Victorino
- Tadashi Wakabayashi
- Wally Yonamine

=== Basketball ===
- Red Rocha

=== Boat racing ===
- Thomas Gentry

=== Bowling ===
- Hiroto Hirashima
- Kotaro Miyasato

=== Boxing ===
- Takeshi Fuji
- Andrew Ganigan
- Stan Harrington
- Sam Ichinose
- Robert M. Lee
- Dado Marino
- Bobo Olson
- Jesus Salud
- Albert Silva
- Ben Villaflor

=== Broadcasting ===
- Les Keiter
- Chuck Leahey
- Jim Leahey

=== Canoe racing ===
- A. E. Minvielle
- Joseph Napoleon

=== Coaching ===
- Kenneth A. Bray
- Tony Sellitto

=== Decathlon ===
- Bryan Clay

=== Diving ===
- Rachel Kealaonapua O'Sullivan

=== American football ===
- Junior Ah You
- Charlie Ane Jr.
- Herman Clark
- Russ Francis
- Rocky Freitas
- Kurt Gouveia
- Hank Hughes
- Maʻake Kemoeatu
- Chris Kemoeatu
- Otto Klum
- Olin Kreutz
- Edison Miyawaki
- Chad Owens
- Jesse Sapolu
- Maa Tanuvasa
- Mosi Tatupu
- Mark Tuinei
- Herman Wedemeyer
- Jeris White
- Wally Yonamine

=== Golf ===
- Francis Hyde Iʻi Brown
- David Ishii
- Tom Kaulukukui
- Ted Makalena
- Jackie Pung
- Lenore Muraoka
- Dean Wilson

=== Martial arts ===
- Kevin Asano
- Dae Sung Lee
- Ed Parker

=== Motorcycle racing ===
- John DeSoto Jr.

=== Racquetball ===
- Egan Inoue

=== Sailing ===
- Michael Rothwell & David McFaull – 1976 Silver Medalist Sailing Team

=== Skateboarding ===
- Darren Ho

=== Skeet shooting ===
- James Austin

=== Soccer ===
- Brian Ching
- Natasha Kai
- Jack Sullivan

=== Sport fishing ===
- Peter Fithian

=== Sports promotion ===
- Larry Price
- Donnis Thompson
- Mackay Yanagisawa

=== Steer roping ===
- Ikua Purdy

=== Sumo ===
- Konishiki Yasokichi
- Takamiyama Daigorō
- Musashimaru Kōyō
- Akebono Tarō

=== Surfing ===
- Ben Aipa
- Lynne Boyer
- George Downing
- Sunny Garcia
- Fred Hemmings
- Derek Ho
- Andy Irons
- Duke Kahanamoku
- Richard Keaulana
- Gerry Lopez
- Kelia Moniz
- Margo Oberg
- Randy Rarick
- Rell Sunn

=== Swimming ===
- Thelma Kalama
- Dad Center
- Dick Cleveland
- Buster Crabbe
- E. Fullard-Leo
- Mariechen Wehselau
- Duke Kahanamoku
- Samuel Kahanamoku
- Maiola Kalili
- Manuella Kalili
- Evelyn Kawamoto
- Pua Kealoha
- Warren Kealoha
- Ford Konno
- Keo Nakama
- Yoshi Oyakawa
- Soichi Sakamoto
- Bill Smith
- Aileen Riggin
- Allen Stack
- Chris Woo
- Bill Woolsey

=== Tennis ===
- Jim Schwitters

=== Track and field ===
- Jim Barahal
- Duncan MacDonald
- Jack Scaff
- Norman Tamanaha

=== Volleyball ===
- Robyn Ah Mow-Santos
- Tita Ahuna
- Lindsey Berg
- Linda Fernandez
- Tom Haine
- Fanny Hopeau
- Beth McLachlin
- Sharon Peterson
- Dave Shoji
- Clay Stanley
- Jon Stanley
- Pedro Velasco

=== Water polo ===
- Brandon Brooks
- Christopher Duplanty

=== Weightlifting ===
- Pete George
- Emerick Ishikawa
- Tommy Kono
- Tony Leiato
- Harold Sakata
- Richard Tom

=== Wind surfing ===
- Robby Naish

=== Women's sports ===
- Patsy Mink

=== Wrestling ===
- Clarissa Chun

=== Yacht racing ===
- Clarence W. MacFarlane
