= Eddie Hamada =

- Born: January 27, 1928; Honolulu, Hawaii
- Died: January 3, 2010 (aged 81); Honolulu, Hawaii
- Occupations: Coach, Athletic Director, Teacher

Edward "Eddie" Hamada (27 January 1928 – 3 January 2010) was a high school football coach, athletic director, and teacher.

== Early life ==
Hamada attended Kaahumanu Elementary School and eventually transferred to Iolani School, where he played football under Kenneth A. Bray. Bray, who had founded Iolani's athletic program, instilled his "One Team" philosophy, which embodied discipline, teamwork, humility, and respect, in Hamada. Hamada in turn carried it on through his own way of life.

== Coaching career ==
After graduating from Iolani, Hamada earned a teaching degree from Emporia State University, returning to Iolani to teach and coach in 1959. The following year he became head football coach, and in 1963 he became the school's athletic director. Under Hamada's coaching, Iolani won three ILH football championships, in 1968, 1972, and 1980. In 1988, Hamada retired from coaching. Three years later, in 1991, he retired as athletic director. That same year, Iolani named its athletic field after him. Many students credited Hamada as being a guiding influence in their lives, giving him the nickname "Mr. Iolani."

== Awards and honors ==
- ESU Athletics Hall of Honor, 1985
- Hamada Field at Iolani School, 1991

== Death ==
Hamada died of natural causes at his home on January 3, 2010. He was so well known throughout the local community that when a photographic portrait of him was taken to a printer to be enlarged for the funeral, the business owner, who had no known Iolani connection, waived the fee upon recognizing Hamada's name. Nearly 2,000 people attended Hamada's memorial service, drawing people from across the United States. Attendees included former Iolani alumni as well as coaches and players from other schools across the state.
