= Kamuela Kahoano =

American singer-songwriter

Kamuela Kahoano (born December 27, 1980) is a singer/songwriter, painter/visual artist and music producer from Honolulu, Hawaii. His music has elements of acoustic, folk, indie and alternative with Hawaiian influences. He performs solo and was formerly the lead singer of the band Analog(ic). He is an accomplished player of both the ukulele and guitar, playing both left-handed; he also plays the djembe. Kahoano claims many influences, including Coldplay, U2 and the Beatles.

Kahoano is a board member of the Ryan's Light Foundation.

== Early life ==
He comes from a family of entertainers. His father, Kimo Kahoano began his career as a Polynesian fire knife dancer and continued as an actor, singer, DJ and emcee. His mother is Lynette Kahoano. His older brothers, Ikaika and Haku, worked in the entertainment industry.

Kahoano grew up in the Kapahulu neighborhood near Waikiki, and started playing music at 6 years old on a ukulele given to him by his grandmother.

Kamuela attended Iolani School, graduating in 1998. He obtained his bachelor's in Music Composition in 2004 from the University of Hawaii at Manoa.

== Career ==
His debut album, Green Light Go, was released January 2007. His latest, Stream Dreams, was released July 14, 2010. He toured with the Slack Key Festival (2017–).

He records for Green Light Go / Kahoano Productions. His production company is Green Light Go HI Productions.

== Discography ==
- Green Light Go (January 2007)
- Grumpy (She's Grumpy It's My Fault) (single, 2007)
- Manalani (Ukulele Solo) (single, 2007)
- Stream Dreams (July 14, 2010)
- Portraits (CD, 2017) Became a 2018 Na Hoku Hanohano Nominee.
- Higher (CD, 2019) 2020 Na Hoku Hanohano Winner for "Best EP (Extended Play)"
- Wot?! (CD, 2019) 2020 Na Hoku Hanohano Nominee for "Best Contemporary Album".
- Love You Anyway (single, 2020)

== Awards ==
Kahoano won a Na Hoku Hanohano Award in 2011 for Rock Album of the year.

Kahoano won a Na Hoku Hanohano Award in 2020 for "EP ("Extended Play") of the Year" for "Higher"
