= Cheryl Hayashi =

American biologist

Cheryl Y. Hayashi
- Born: Hawaii
- Education: Yale University
- Known for: Studying spider silk
- Awards: MacArthur Fellow
- Scientific career
- Fields: functional genomics | comparative biology | biomechanics | biochemistry
- Workplaces: University of Wyoming; University of California, Riverside; American Museum of Natural History

Cheryl Y. Hayashi is a biologist who specializes in the evolution and functional properties of spider silk. She is the Provost and Sr. Vice President for Science at the American Museum of Natural History, where she is a curator and professor in the Division of Invertebrate Zoology. She also serves as the Leon Hess Director of Comparative Biology Research. She was a graduate of Yale University, a professor at University California Riverside, and a 2007 MacArthur Fellow.

== Education ==
Hayashi graduated from Iolani High School in 1985 and was a member of the school's first co-educational class. She continued her studies at Yale University, gaining a Bachelor of Science in 1988, Master of Science in 1990, and a Master of Philosophy in 1993. She worked with Prof. Catherine Craig, including field work in Panama, becoming interested in spiders when she had the job of hand-feeding the professor's colony of tropical spiders.

She was awarded a PhD by Yale in 1996, with a dissertation on the systematics of spiders using ribosomal DNA.

== Career ==
After working as a postdoctoral researcher at the University of Wyoming (1996-2001), Hayashi was a professor at UC Riverside from 2001 to the end of 2016.

Her UC Riverside laboratory's work characterized spiders in the spidroin gene family, including how silk is encoded and studying the basis of molecular diversity in spiders. A variety of techniques, including whole-gene cloning, genomics, biochemistry, and biomechanics, were used to study the evolution of spider silk. Hayashi worked with engineers and biomechanics to understand spider silk, and to develop biomaterials based on spider genetic information.

She became curator, professor, and Leon Hess Director of Comparative Biology Research at the American Museum of Natural History in January 2017, where she initially served as the Director of the Institute for Comparative Genomics. She was appointed Provost and Sr. VP for Science in 2021.

Hayashi was a speaker at the TED 2010 Conference.

== Awards ==
She was the recipient of the MacArthur Fellowship Program in 2007.
