= Hirajima =

Hirajima (written: 平嶋 or 平島) is a Japanese surname. Notable people with the surname include:

- Natsumi Hirajima (平嶋 夏海, born 1992), Japanese idol and actress
- Takashi Hirajima (平島 崇, born 1982), Japanese footballer

== See also ==
- Hirashima, a surname written with the same characters
