= Mackay Yanagisawa =

American sports promoter

Mackay Yanagisawa (1918–2000) was an American sports promoter. Known as the "Shogun of Sports," he created the Hula Bowl and was a co-organizer of the Aloha Bowl, two collegiate-level football games in Hawaii, United States.

== Early life ==
Yanagisawa attended McKinley High School where he played football. After graduating, he became a salesman at a sporting goods company. He was of Japanese descent.

== Career ==
In 1962, Yanagisawa became part-owner of the Hawaii Islanders baseball team while managing Hawai‘i’s Honolulu Stadium. After witnessing the Rose Bowl Game, University of California, Los Angeles' Paul Stupin messaged Yanagisawa asking him if he would be interested in sponsoring a college football All-Star game. By 1964, Yanagisawa and Paul Stupin co-organized a college football All-Star game in Hawaii titled "the Hula Bowl". The Bowl was sponsored by charities with the understanding that all financial gain went back to them. However, due to poor weather causing a lack of attendance, Yanagisawa was forced to re-mortgage his house three times to keep the event running. Eventually, television revenue from the Bowl allowed him to gain financial stability without a mortgage. During this time, he was inducted into the Hawaii Sports Hall of Fame. As a result of the Hula Bowl, Yanagisawa became known as the "Shogun of Sports."

In 1948, Yanagisawa arranged a United States tour with a Hawaiian baseball team and the Harlem Globetrotters. He owned the Asahi Baseball Team which played in the Hawaii Baseball League until 1955 when he sold it to Angel Shiro Maehara. Yanagisawa would later sell the Hula Bowl in 1974 to Gannett Corp and founded the Aloha Bowl. It was originally named the Pineapple Bowl but was renamed after a drop in sponsors. In 1981, Aloha Airlines signed on as a sponsor, spurring the name change to the Aloha Bowl.

However, this bowl too struggled financially and as executive director, Yanagisawa gave an estimated $200,000 to keep the Bowl stable. By 1984, the Aloha Bowl drew a crowd of 41,777 for a game between SMU and Notre Dame. A few years later, Yanagisawa was inducted into the University of Hawaii's Hall of Fame.

In 1995, Yanagisawa was the recipient of the University of Hawaii's Regents' Medals of Distinction. Yanagisawa died shortly thereafter at the age of 87.
