= Kapu Kuialua =

Hawaiian martial art

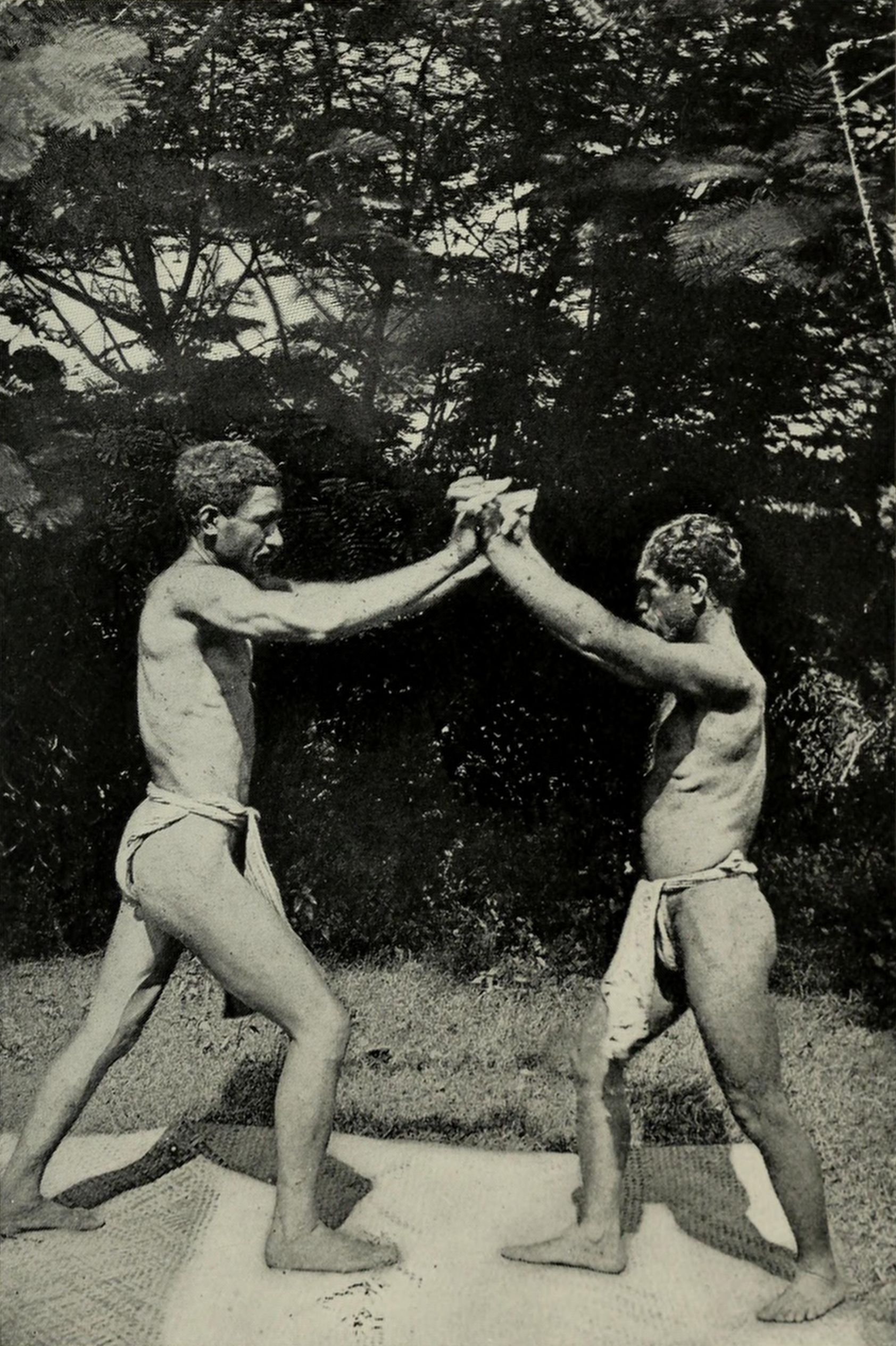
- Also known as: Kapu Kuʻialua, Kuʻialua
- Focus: Joint manipulation
- Country of origin: (Hawaii) Kingdom Of Hawai'i
- Olympic sport: No

Kapu Kuʻialua; Kuʻialua; or Lua; is an ancient Hawaiian martial art based on bone breaking, joint locks, throws, pressure point manipulation, strikes, usage of various weapons, battlefield strategy, open ocean warfare as well as the usage of introduced firearms from the Europeans.

== History ==
=== Origin and ancient use ===
A caste system and various martial arts were introduced to the Hawaiian Islands by Tahitian colonists, who arrived in the 1300s. The Koa warrior group are credited by Black Belt magazine as the creators of the martial art of Kuʻialua.

The name "Kuʻialua" literally means "two hits" in Hawaiian. That name was subsequently given to the god of this martial art. Only those associated with the aliʻi (nobility), such as professional warriors, guardsmen, and members of the royal families, were generally taught Kuʻialua. During times of warfare, the makaʻāinana (commoners) were also instructed in the basic movements and functions of the martial art. The old warriors of this art would coat themselves with a thin layer of coconut oil and remove all of their body hair in order to be able to slip away and avoid being grappled in battle. The word for Lua masters, ʻōlohe, literally means "hairless".

The Koa helped Kamehameha the Great unify the islands in 1810. Lua was only to be practiced by the king’s honor guards, and others were forbidden to learn it. The word "kapu," meaning "forbidden", is a part of the old name.

=== Modern times ===
While living on Oʻahu, Kamehameha II established three Lua schools (called pā kuʻialua) to help prevent extinction of this art. One school was instructed by Hāhākea, another by Nāmakaimi, and another by Nāpuaʻuki and his assistants. Nāpuaʻuki's school, probably the most prominent one, taught 24 boys, including Kekūanaōʻa and John Papa ʻĪʻī of Kamehameha's court.

Some of the techniques used in Lua were incorporated into danzan-ryū jujutsu, which was developed in Hilo by Henry Okazaki in the 1920s.

Introducing the sport to America in 1963, Õlohe Solomon Kaihewalu brought the sport public in the 1960s, a controversial act, as previously, the martial art had not been taught to outsiders. Direct disciple of Olohe Solomon Kaihewalu are: Kumu Lua Carlos Deleon, Kumu Lua Mike Wittle, Kumu Lua Michelle Manu, Kumu Lua Hans Ingebretsen, Kumu Lua James Muro, Kumu Lua Isidro Trujillo, Kumu Lua Tim McGuire, Kumu Lua Ron Burns, Kumu Lua Greg Shaner.

== Style specifics ==
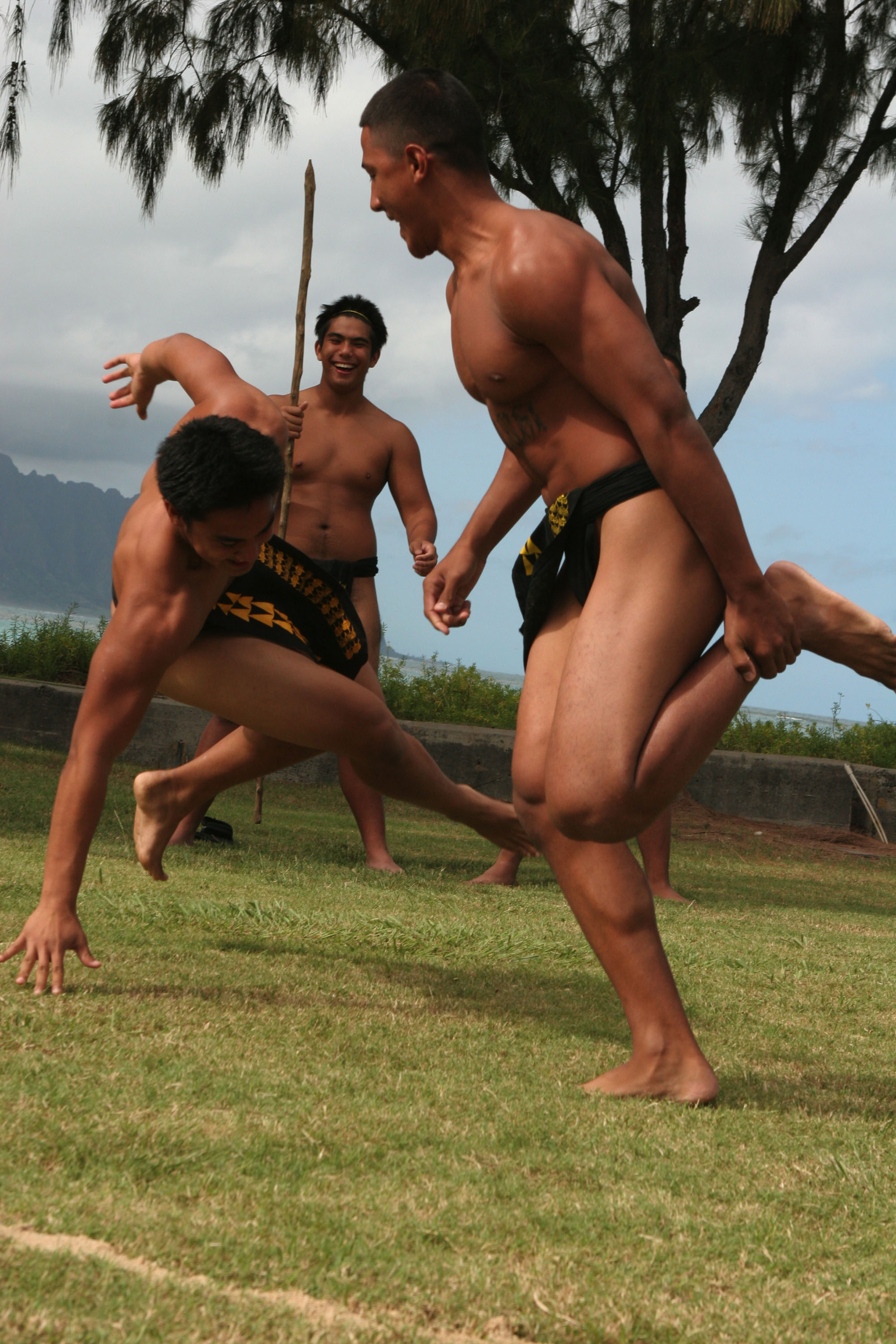
Hawaiian wrestling matches during Makahiki

The Lua martial art style is based on bone breaking, joint locks, throws, pressure point manipulation, strikes, usage of various weapons, battlefield strategy, open ocean warfare as well as the usage of firearms.

Kumu Lua is the title of a teacher of Hawaiian Lua martial arts. “Kumu Lua” means teacher (Kumu) Lua (martial art style). Kumu Lua is similar to Sensei for a teacher of Japanese martial arts, Guru for a teacher of Filipino martial arts, or Sifu for a teacher of Chinese martial arts. For the Hawaiian Lua Martial Arts in the Kaihewalu lineage, the title of Kumu Lua was granted to the disciples of Olohe Solomon Kaihewalu, founder of the Kaihewalu Lua Halau O Kaihewalu.

The modern form of Lua has been adjusted to suit modern times; however, the traditional spirit of the art remains intact. Weapons used by natives of the Hawaiian Islands may have been focused primarily on the artform at one time, as it is said the fighter who loses his weapons should then resort to the hand-to-hand stylings of Kuʻialua.

=== Training methods ===
Training methods include spear catching, training in the surf, and focus of "mana" or life force. This energy is described much like qi in Chinese or ki in Japanese martial arts. Exercises are used to focus this energy much like the exercise of qigong.

=== Weapons ===
- Hoe - Canoe paddle
- Hoe Leiomano - Paddle, shark tooth weapon
- Ihe - Short spear with barbed edges or straight point (up to 9 ft or 2.7 m staff)
- Kaʻane - Cuerda (strangling cord)
- Koʻokoʻo - Staffs (long and short)
  - Koʻokoʻo Loa (6 ft or 1.8 m staff)
  - Koʻokoʻo Pōkole (4 ft or 1.2 m staff)
- Kuʻekuʻe Lima Leiomanō - Knuckle duster weapon
- Leiomanō - Shark tooth weapon
- Maʻa - Sling
- Maka Pāhoa - Double-edge (eye) dagger
- Newa - Short (small) club
- Pahi - Knife
- Pāhoa - Single-edge dagger
- Pāhoa Koʻokoʻo - Cane double-edge dagger

== Modern references ==
- Lua was featured in "Kekoa (The Warrior)," episode 16 of the third season of the Hawaii Five-O reboot.

== See also ==
- List of martial arts
- Culture of the Native Hawaiians
- Moraingy
