= Kirk Cashmere =

American lawyer

- Born: July 18, 1955; Milwaukee, Wisconsin
- Died: December 2, 2002 (aged 47)
- Resting place: Mililani Memorial Park
- Education: Brandeis University; William S. Richardson School of Law at the University of Hawaiʻi at Mānoa
- Occupation: Attorney
- Known for: Same-sex marriage in Hawaii

Kirk H. Cashmere (July 18, 1955 – December 2, 2002) was a prominent civil rights attorney who helped make same-sex marriage a major issue in Hawaii, as well as a historian and pioneer of organized Judaism in the state.

== Early life ==
Born on July 18, 1955, in Milwaukee, Wisconsin, his family moved to Hawaii when he was 5 years old. He attended the Iolani School and earned a degree in Near Eastern and Judaic studies at Brandeis University.

== Career ==
Cashmere studied Law at the William S. Richardson School of Law at the University of Hawaiʻi at Mānoa. he served as legal director for the ACLU, worked with the Legal Aid Society of Hawaii and the Life Foundation, and was a member of the state's Ethics Committee from 1996 to June 30, 1999.

As a member of the "Governor's Committee on HIV/AIDS," he played a central role in formulating policy that would at once protect the public from unsafe exposure and maintain the confidence of carriers.

=== Notable legal cases ===
==== Camp H.M. Smith cross ====
In 1984 and 1986, he filed suit against the Marine Corps to remove a 65-foot cross at Camp Holland M. Smith in Honolulu. Plaintiffs in the suit alleged that the cross is a religious symbol that violates the First Amendment. The cross had been erected for an Easter service in 1966, but naval officials argued it was a non-religious monument to prisoners of war and soldiers missing in action. Naval Admiral Judge Advocate T.E. Flynn decided to remove the cross in 1986, but that decision was overturned by Marine Corps commandant General Paul Kelley in 1987. In 1988, federal district court Judge Thomas Hogan ordered the cross to be removed. The cross was removed on December 1, 1988, and replaced with an 80-foot flagpole and a monument.

==== Cammack v. Waihee ====
On November 14, 1988, he challenged the state's Good Friday holiday as a violation of the U.S. Constitution's First Amendment and the Hawaii State Constitution. The case was decided on August 9, 1991. The U.S. 9th Circuit Court of Appeals court upheld Hawaii's right to declare Good Friday as an official state holiday.

==== Baehr v. Lewin ====
On May 1, 1991, the plaintiffs filed a complaint in the First Circuit Court of Hawaii that the Hawaii Marriage Law was unconstitutional because it prohibited issuing a marriage license on the sole basis of same sex.

On May 5, 1993, the Hawaii Supreme Court issued a decision in Baehr v. Lewin (later known as Baehr v. Miike). Cashmere was Lambda Legal Defense's local counsel and co-authored the amicus brief.

In 1996, Cashmere was an attorney for three couples who sued Hawaii for denying marriage licenses on the sole basis the applicants were of the same sex. Circuit Judge Kevin Chang ruled that the state failed to prove a "compelling reason" to ban same-sex marriages.

== Death ==
Cashmere died on December 2, 2002. A memorial service was held at Temple Emanu-El.

The annual Kirk Cashmere Jewish Film Festival has been held in Honolulu from 2002 to 2019.
