= George W. T. Loo =

American politician

Member of the Hawaii House of Representatives
- In office 1965–1970

Personal details
- Born: George Wing Tat Loo; December 28, 1930 Honolulu, Hawaii, U.S.
- Died: December 12, 2018 (aged 87) Waipahu, Hawaii, U.S.
- Party: Democratic
- Education: University of Hawaiʻi; University of Michigan Law School; George Washington Law School

George Wing Tat Loo (December 28, 1930 – December 12, 2018) was an American politician. He served as a Democratic member of the Hawaii House of Representatives.

== Life and career ==
Loo was born in Honolulu, Hawaii. He attended ʻIolani School, the University of Hawai'i, the University of Michigan Law School and George Washington Law School. He served in the army during the Korean War.

Loo served in the Hawaii House of Representatives from 1965 to 1970.

Loo died on December 12, 2018 at his private care home in Waipahu, Hawaii, at the age of 87.
