= Remi Yamamoto =

American political advisor

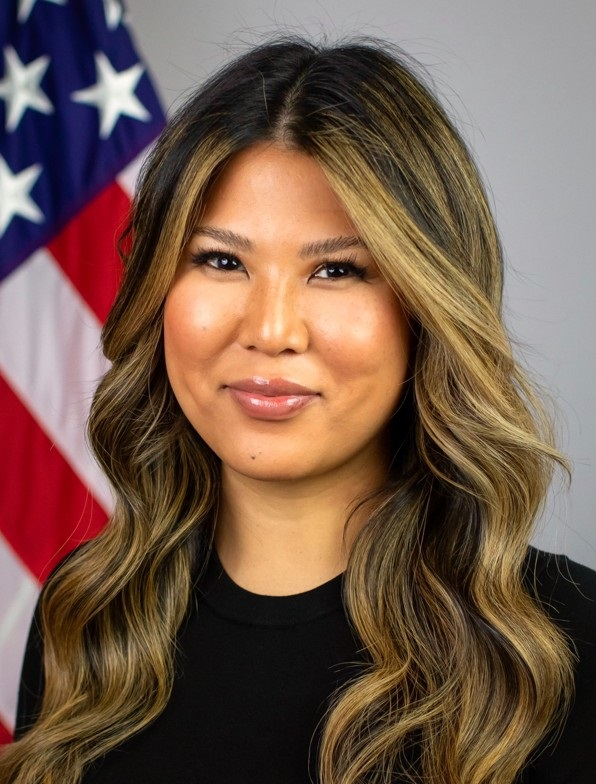
- Yamamoto in 2021
- Born: Honolulu, Hawaii, U.S.
- Education: George Washington University
- Occupation: Senior advisor for communications to the White House Chief of Staff
- Years active: 2020-
- Known for: Political Campaign Communications
- Notable work: Biden Harris 2020 Press Secretary

Remi Yamamoto was the senior advisor for communications to the White House Chief of Staff.

== Early life and education ==
Yamamoto is from Honolulu, Hawaii. She attended ʻIolani School, graduating in 2010. She studied at George Washington University, completing her bachelor's degree in 2013.

== Career ==
In 2013, after graduating from college, Yamamoto served an internship for the Obama administration's communications office.

Yamamoto served as a regional press secretary (Virginia) for the 2016 presidential campaign of Hillary Clinton.

In 2017 she was press secretary for Tom Perriello's Virginia gubernatorial campaign.

In October 2017 she was hired as communications director for the failed Iowa gubernatorial campaign for Democrat Fred Hubbell.

During the Biden Harris 2020 Campaign for president, Yamamoto was the traveling national press secretary. In a December 18, 2020 White House press release Yamamoto was named Senior Advisor for Communications to the Chief of Staff.
