= Jerry Scanlan =

American football player (1957–2015)

No. 76
- Position: Tight end

Personal information
- Born: January 4, 1957; Honolulu, Hawaii, U.S.
- Died: July 8, 2015 (aged 58); Honolulu, Hawaii, U.S.
- Listed height: 6 ft 5 in (1.96 m)
- Listed weight: 270 lb (122 kg)

Career information
- High school: Iolani
- College: Hawaiʻi
- NFL draft: 1980: undrafted

Career history
- Washington Redskins (1980–1981)
- Stats at Pro Football Reference

Jerry Lafaele Scanlan (January 4, 1957 – July 8, 2015), nicknamed "The Snake", was an American football tight end in the National Football League for the Washington Redskins. He played college football at the University of Hawaiʻi at Mānoa.
