= Emerick Ishikawa =

American weightlifter (1920–2006)

Personal information
- Nationality: American
- Born: October 23, 1920
- Died: November 26, 2006 (aged 86)

Sport
- Sport: Weightlifting

Emerick K. Ishikawa (October 23, 1920 – November 26, 2006) was an American weightlifter from Hawaii. In 1944 he set a world record in the bantamweight class at the U.S. National Weightlifting Championships. He won Amateur Athletic Union championships as a bantamweight in 1944 and 1945, and as a featherweight in 1946 and 1947. In 1947 he also won a bronze medal in the featherweight class of the World Championships. He also competed in the men's featherweight event at the 1948 Summer Olympics.

In 1975 he was inducted into the (American) National Weightlifting Hall of Fame, and in 1999 he was inducted into the Hawaii Sports Hall of Fame.

He was Japanese-American, and was held for some time at a Japanese American internment camp at Tule Lake in California.
