= Small Circle JuJitsu =

Hybrid Japanese martial art

- Focus: Hybrid
- Country of origin: United States
- Creator: Wally Jay
- Famous practitioners: Bruce Lee, Jackie Chan, Donnie Yen
- Parenthood: Danzan-ryū Jujutsu, Judo, Boxing
- Olympic sport: No
- Official website: http://www.smallcirclejujitsu.com/

Small Circle Jujitsu is a style of jujutsu developed by Wally Jay that focuses on employing dual simultaneous push/pull actions and smooth transitions.

== History ==
Wally Jay primarily studied Danzan-ryū jujutsu under Seishiro Okazaki (also known as Henry S. Okazaki) in Hawaii. He was awarded a Certificate of Mastery from Okazaki on February 22, 1948. Previously he had studied boxing and judo. As Wally Jay gained knowledge and experience in the martial arts, he became focused on improving traditional techniques. Ultimately, it was during his two years of training under the Hawaiian Judo Champion, Ken Kawachi, which gave him the principles he needed to formulate his system of Small Circle JuJitsu. Kawachi had stressed wrist action to gain superior leverage against an opponent. This wrist action is prevalent in Small Circle Jujitsu techniques and over the years Wally Jay made radical changes in the techniques he acquired.

He has produced many national, state, and regional judo and jujitsu champions. In 1968 David Quinonez and in 1970 Bradford Burgo were recipients of the Yamaguchi Award "for their outstanding showing" when they captured the 120 pound crown.

== Development ==
Small circle jujitsu techniques are smooth and functional because of the integration of the flow, in which interchangeable techniques are used to counterattack. The flow emphasises the smooth transition between various locks and throws in order to remove any "hard stops". It allows a practitioner to seamlessly transition between techniques and makes counter-measures against opponents quicker and smoother.

Small Circle Jujitsu continues to evolve from a combination of various martial arts theories, styles and movements. It contains Sixteen Principles, which were guidelines by which a practitioner of Small Circle JuJitsu could improve upon the fundamental basics involved in the functionality of their technique.

During the 1990s Wally Jay, Remy Presas (Modern Arnis), and Jack Hogan (Kyusho Jitsu) traveled together throughout the United States and worldwide promulgating small-circle jujitsu. Through Remy Presas elements of Small Circle JuJitsu have been integrated into Modern Arnis.

Jack Hogan promoted and advanced the principles of small-circle jujitsu having incorporated a multitude of the techniques into Hogan Karate International and the Kyusho Certification Program.

In August 2002, Wally Jay held a ceremony officially handing the title of grandmaster over to his son Leon Jay in their hometown of Alameda, California. Family, friends, several martial arts masters and the media witnessed the occasion.

Leon Jay still practices and teaches Small Circle Jujitsu from his base in Surrey, UK and across the world.

== Sixteen Principles ==
1. Balance
2. Mobility and Stability
3. Avoid the Head On Collision of Forces
4. Mental Resistance and Distraction
5. Focus to the Smallest Point Possible
6. Energy Transfer
7. Create a Base
8. Sticking Control and Sensitivity
9. Rotational Momentum
10. Transitional Flow (which includes):
  - Exert Continual Pain During Transitions
  - Create Maximum Pain Without Dislocating Joint
  - Mobility During Transition Rather than Stability
11. Two Way Action
12. Wrist Snap
13. Pulsing & Waving
14. Cascade Effect
15. Whiplash
16. Entries & Exits

== See also ==
- Chin Na
