= Nathan Leites =

Russian American sociologist and political scientist

Nathan Leites (July 10, 1912, in Saint Petersburg – 1987) was an American sociologist and political scientist of Russian origins. Leites earned his doctorate in 1935 at the University of Freiburg. After emigrating to the United States, he joined the RAND Corporation in 1949 and earned himself a reputation as a knowledgeable analyst of the system of government of the Soviet Union. He also taught at the University of Chicago. He is considered to be the initiator of the operational code approach to the analysis of foreign relations. His selected works were published in 1977 by Sage as Psychopolitical analysis : selected writings of Nathan Leites.

== Publications ==
=== Books ===
- The Operational Code of the Politburo McGraw Hill, New York, 1951.According to WorldCat, the book is held in 610 libraries
- On the Game of Politics in France, Stanford University Press, 1959.
- Rebellion and authority; an analytic essay on insurgent conflicts Chicago, Markham Pub. Co.,1970 (with Charles Wolf) < According to WorldCat, the book is held in 533 libraries
- A Study of bolshevism. : Glencoe, Ill., Free Press [1953]

=== Articles ===
- Trends in Twentieth Century Propaganda, in Psychoanalysis and the Social Sciences, I, International Universities Press, New York, 1947. With Ernst Kris.
- Some Psychological Hypotheses on Nazi Germany, Journal of Social Psychology, XXVI, 1947; XXVII, 1948; XXVIII, 1948.

=== Reports ===
- The Language of Politics, Stewart, New York, 1949. With Harold Laswell.
- The Political meaning of the Kostov Trial in Sofia, Bulgaria, December 1949, The RAND Corporation, RM-371, April 1950.
- The Operational Code of the Politburo, The RAND Corporation, P-206, August 1950. Also published by McGraw Hill, New York, 1951.
- Some useful passages from Lenin and Stalin, The RAND Corporation, RM-569, March 1951.
- Stalin as an Intellectual, The RAND Corporation, P-408, May 1953. Also published in World Politics, VI, 1953.
- A Study of Bolschevism, The RAND Corporation, R-239, May 1953.
- The Stalinist Heritage in Soviet Foreign Policy, The RAND Corporation, RM-1003, May 1953.
- The Statutes of the Communist Party: Democratic Facade and Totalitarian Reality, The RAND Corporation, RM-1004, May 1953.

==== With Elsa Bernaut ====
- Ritual of Liquidation: the Case of the Moscow Trials, The RAND Corporation, RM-977, February 1954. With Elsa Bernaut.
- The Kremlin's Horizon, The RAND Corporation, RM-3506-ISA, March 1963.
- The "Europe" of the French, The RAND Corporation, P-4584-ISA, June 1965.
- The New Economic Togetherness: American And Soviet Reactions, The RAND Corporation, R-1369-ARPA, December 1973.
- What Soviet Commanders Fear From Their Own Forces, The RAND Corporation, P-5958, May 1978.
- Soviet Style in War, The RAND Corporation, R-2615-NA, April 1982.
- Soviet Style in Management, The RAND Corporation, R-3128-NA, July 1984.
