= Leslie Vincent =

American actor

Leslie Vincent (September 6, 1909 – February 1, 2001) was an American actor.

== Biography ==
Born in 1909 as Leslie Fullard-Leo, Vincent grew up in Hawaii and graduated from Punahou School. During the 1930s, he worked on a steamer ship, lived in Shanghai for a year, and then moved to England, where he worked on the stock exchange. He studied acting at the Royal Academy of London. After being "discovered" by Marlene Dietrich he went on to appear in more than 30 films including Forever Amber, Destry Rides Again and Paris Underground.

Vincent's family, the Fullard-Leo family, purchased the Palmyra Atoll (except for some minor islets) on August 19, 1922, for $70,000 from Henry Ernest Cooper, and established The Palmyra Copra Company. The family was involved, decades later, in a lawsuit with the United States government over ownership of the atoll. His heavy involvement in the lawsuit caused Vincent to retire from film. The United States Supreme Court ruled in favour of the Fullard-Leo family in 1947. In 2000, these lands were sold to The Nature Conservancy.

Once the lawsuit was settled, Vincent entered the hotel business in Hawaii. He died on February 1, 2001, in Honolulu, aged 91.

== Selected filmography ==
- Destry Rides Again (1939)
- The Purple V (1943)
- Pursuit to Algiers (1945)
- Paris Underground (1945)
- Deadline for Murder (1946)
- Forever Amber (1947)
