= Tairajima =

Island within the Ryukyu Islands

Native name: Japanese: 平島
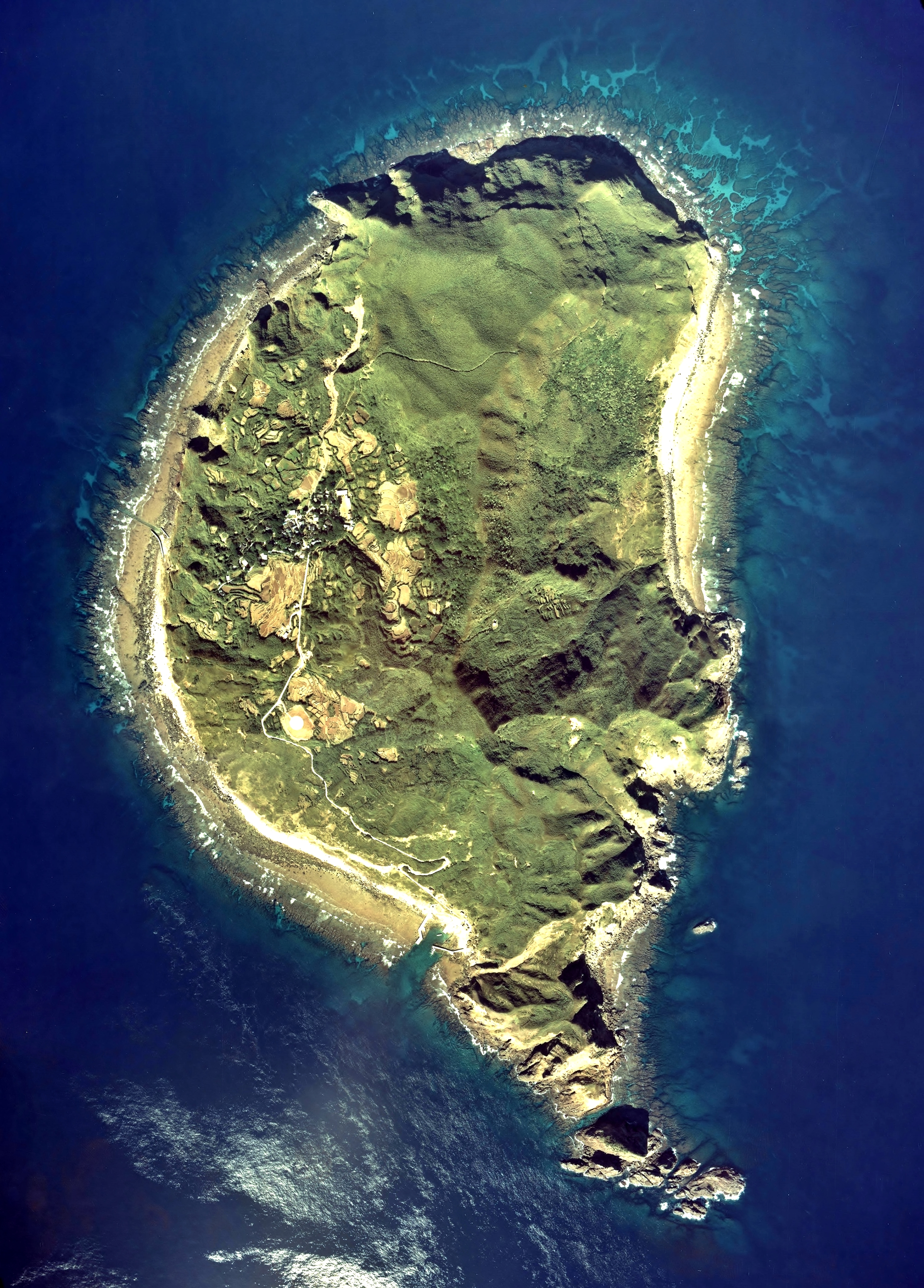
- Aerial photograph of Tairajima
- Interactive map of Tairajima

Geography
- Location: East China Sea
- Coordinates: 29°41′16.1″N 129°31′42.1″E
- Archipelago: Tokara Islands
- Area: 2.08 km^{2} (0.80 sq mi)
- Length: 1.5 km (0.93 mi)
- Width: 1.0 km (0.62 mi)
- Coastline: 7.23 km (4.493 mi)
- Highest elevation: 242.9 m (796.9 ft)

Administration
- Japan

Demographics
- Population: 89 (2020)
- Pop. density: 42.78/km^{2} (110.8/sq mi)
- Ethnic groups: Japanese

Tairajima (平島), is one of the Tokara Islands, a sub-group of the Satsunan Islands belonging to Kagoshima Prefecture, Japan. The island, 2.08 km² in area, has a population of 89 persons. The island can only be reached by boat as it has no airport; there is a ferry service twice per week to the city of Kagoshima on the mainland and Naze in Amami Oshima. Travel time is about 9 hours to Kagoshima and 6 to Amami Oshima. The islanders are dependent mainly on fishing, seasonal tourism, and agriculture.

== Geography ==
Tairajima is located 32 kilometres (17 nmi) southwest of Nakanoshima, and is the second smallest inhabited islands in the archipelago. The island has an area of approximately 2.08 square kilometres (0.80 sq mi) with a length of about 1.5 kilometres (0.93 mi) and a width of 1.0 kilometre (0.62 mi). The highest elevation on the island is 242.9 metres (797 ft) above sea level. Its climate is classified as subtropical, with a rainy season from May through September. The island has one onsen, a post office, and a community center.

== History ==
Per local folklore, the island was one of the havens of the defeated Heike clan after they lost the Genpei War against the Minamoto clan.

Until 1624, the island was part of the Ryukyu Kingdom. During the Edo period, Takarajima was part of Satsuma Domain and was administered as part of Kawabe District. In 1896, the island was transferred to the administrative control of Ōshima District, Kagoshima, and from 1911 was part of the village of Toshima, Kagoshima. From 1946 to 1952, the island was administered by the United States as part of the Provisional Government of Northern Ryukyu Islands.
