= Hank Hughes =

American football player (1907–1963)

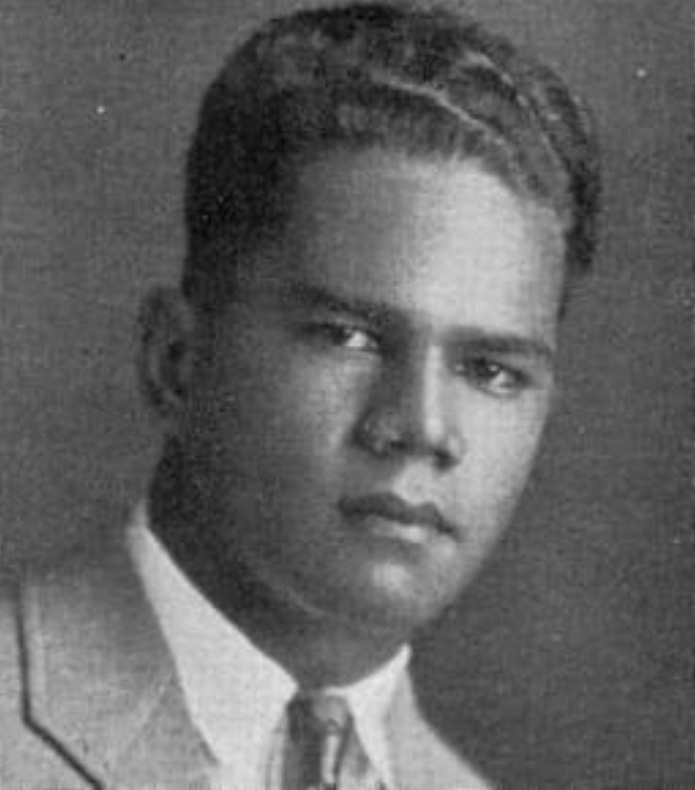
- Hughes in 1927

Profile
- Position: Back

Personal information
- Born: May 14, 1907; Honolulu, Hawaii Territory, U.S.
- Died: December 27, 1963 (aged 56); Honolulu, Hawaii, U.S.

Career information
- High school: Punahou School (Honolulu)
- College: Oregon State

Career history
- Boston Braves (1932)
- Stats at Pro Football Reference

Henry Thomas "Honolulu" Hughes Jr. (May 4, 1907 – December 27, 1963) was an American football running back in the National Football League (NFL) for the Boston Braves. He played college football for the Oregon State Beavers.

Hughes graduated from Punahou School in 1927, and became the first Native Hawaiian to attend Oregon State University. While a football player for the Beavers, he would entertain the crowds during halftime by kicking the ball barefoot.
