= Hiroto Hirashima =

Hiroto "Hiro" Hirashima (July 11, 1910 – November 23, 2007) was a Japanese American civil rights activist who was pivotal in obtaining equal rights and privileges for his fellow Japanese American bowlers, as well as other minorities, at a time when non-caucasians were ineligible for American Bowling Congress (ABC) membership.

With ABC's racial barrier finally removed in 1950, Hirashima organized nine teams of Nisei bowlers for the 1954 ABC Tournament in Seattle. In 1963, he was elected to the ABC board of directors, becoming the first minority to serve on the board.

Hirashima was inducted into the USBC Hall of Fame as an ABC Pioneer in 1995. He is the founder of the Hawaii State Bowling Association and the Oahu Bowling Association. He was honored as an ABC life member in 1995, and served on the ABC Board of Directors for over 30 years.

Born in Kaneohe, Hawaii, he was inducted into the Hawaii Sports Hall of Fame by Governor Ben Cayetano in 1997.
