= Kenneth A. Bray =

American Episcopal Church priest and sports coach (1879–1953)

Kenneth Augustine Bray (May 26, 1879 – January 9, 1953) was an American Episcopal priest, teacher, sportsman and coach. He founded the athletic program for Iolani School from 1932 to 1953, establishing the "One Team" philosophy touted by many teachers, coaches and students at the school.

== Biography ==
Kenneth A. Bray was born on May 26, 1879, in Barrow-in-Furness, Lancashire, England. His father, the Reverend Thomas William Bray, was once a vicar of St. Paul's Church in Aberdeen, Scotland. Father Bray studied at the University of Oxford. He stated, "When I went to Oxford, I did not go in for the scholastic honors as my brothers did," but instead, "I went in for athletics. Mother was disappointed." He earned the Bachelor of Divinity degree from General Theological Seminary in New York City and was ordained in 1909. He coached football, basketball, and baseball at Geneva High School (New York) where he also led the drama club. That overlapped his service as rector of St. Peter's Episcopal Church (Geneva, New York) from 1914 to 1924. During his early teaching years, in 1917, Bray enlisted in the military for service in World War I. He taught both Greek and Latin at St. Stephens College and Nashotah House, Wisconsin. He also taught at Choate School in Wallingford, Connecticut, and The Hill School in Pottstown, Pennsylvania, where he coached basketball, baseball, lacrosse and football.

Father Bray moved to Hawaii in 1932, and taught at Iolani School. During the next two decades of athletics, Father Bray distinguished his players with traditions that exemplified outstanding character qualities of excellence, humility, hard work, discipline and sportsmanship. Numerous championships over two decades came as a result of Bray's coaching, including a "Clean Sweep" of three championships (1950–1951) in football, basketball and baseball in the same school year.

== Seabiscuit's horseshoe ==
In 1939, following the epic victory of Seabiscuit over War Admiral in the match race at Pimlico racetrack in Maryland (1938), Father Bray wrote a letter to Charles S. Howard, the wealthy owner of Seabiscuit. He explained how the display of courage had drawn the admiration of not just of an entire nation, but of young athletes from a small school in Honolulu. He requested one of Seabiscuit's horseshoes. Howard responded with more than a letter. Howard sent one of the shoes Seabiscuit used during the dramatic win against War Admiral. The shoe became a talisman for Iolani football players who would ceremoniously kiss the horseshoe on their bus rides to the old Honolulu Stadium.

== Influence ==
Many of Father Bray's "boys" went on to become leading high school and collegiate coaches, teachers, business leaders, and professionals in the medical and dental fields. On June 24, 1981, the Father Kenneth A. Bray Athletic Complex was dedicated at Iolani School. He was honored as a member of the Hawaii Sports Hall of Fame.
