= Wally Jay =

American martial artist (1917–2011)

- Born: June 15, 1917; Honolulu, Territory of Hawaii
- Died: May 29, 2011 (aged 93); Redwood City, California
- Style: Small Circle Jujitsu, Danzan Ryu Jujutsu, Kodenkan Jujutsu, Judo, Boxing
- Teachers: Seishiro Okazaki, Juan Gomez, Ken Kawachi
- Rank: 10th degree red belt in Small Circle Jujitsu; 6th degree red and white belt in Judo

Other information
- Notable students: Bruce Lee, Leon Jay, George Dillman, Ron Craddock, Jack Hogan (Kyusho Jitsu) Ernie Boggs, Professor Tony Maynard
- Website: Small-Circle Jujitsu Official Site

Wah-leong "Wally" Jay (June 15, 1917 – May 29, 2011), was an American martial artist who primarily studied and taught jujutsu and judo. He was the founder of the Gendai Budo martial art Small Circle Jujitsu.

== Biography ==
Jay was born in Hawaii of Chinese descent. At age 11, he began to study boxing under a community program. By the age of 18 he was studying jujitsu under Paul Kaelemakule. In 1938, Wally enrolled at Oregon State College where he studied medicine and agriculture. In 1940, he studied Danzan Ryu jujutsu under Juan Gomez and learned judo under the former Hawaiian Champion, Ken Kawachi. Jay and his wife Bernice were awarded a Certificate of Mastery by Seishiro Okazaki, the founder of Danzan Ryu jujutsu, on February 22, 1948.

Jay spent time with Bruce Lee and his associates in 1962 teaching them judo and jujutsu techniques

Jay was the head instructor of Jay's Jujitsu Studio, which is also known as Island Judo/Jujitsu Club in Alameda, California. Even past the age of 90, he traveled worldwide teaching seminars on Small Circle Jujitsu. Jay published two books; Dynamic Ju Jitsu and Small Circle JuJitsu and numerous instructional videos.

During the 1990s Wally Jay, Remy Presas (Modern Arnis), and George Dillman (Kyusho Jitsu) traveled together throughout the United States and worldwide promulgating small-circle jujitsu. Remy Presas incorporated elements of Small Circle JuJitsu into Modern Arnis. Jack Hogan continues to promote and advance the principles of Wally Jay's small-circle jujitsu having incorporated a multitude of the techniques into Hogan Karate International and the Kyusho Certification Program.

In 1969, Jay was inducted into Black Belt Magazine’s Black Belt Hall of Fame as “Ju-Jitsu Sensei of the Year” and again in 1990 as “Man of the Year”.

In August 2002, Jay held a ceremony officially handing the title of grandmaster over to his son Leon Jay in their hometown of Alameda, California. Family, friends, several martial arts masters and the media witnessed the occasion.

== Notable Achievements ==
- In 1964, Professor Wally Won the AJI Outstanding Coach Award
- In 1968, a student of the Professor's - David Quinonez - won the National High School Judo Championship 120 Pound Crown
- In 1969, the Professor was inducted into the Black Belt Hall of Fame for his contributions to the art of judo
- In 1970, another student of the Professor's - Bradford Burgo - won the National High School Judo Championship 120 Pound Crown
- In 1972, the Professor retired from the U.S. Postal Service and went back to school, eventually earning his B.A from Sonoma State College
- In 1977, the Professor and various colleagues founded Jujitsu America
- In 1980, the Professor was inducted into the Black Belt Hall of Fame for his contributions to the art of jujitsu
- In 1985, the Professor was the first person to be invited to captain an American team at the International Wushu Championship in Xian, China
- In 1990, the Professor was named Black Belt's Man of the Year
- In 1991, the Professor was awarded an Honorary Doctorate by the College of Martial Arts in Sioux Falls, South Dakota
- In 1992, the Professor was invited to demonstrate his art at Japan's Dai Nippon Butokuden
- In 1993, the Professor was inducted into the Danzan-ryū Hall of Fame
- In 1999, the Professor was named on Inside Kung Fu'ss Most influential Martial Artists

== Death ==
Jay suffered a stroke on May 24, 2011. He was later removed from life support according to his stated wishes and died on May 29, 2011, at the age of 93.

== Bibliography ==
- Small-Circle Jujitsu (August 1989) ISBN 0-89750-122-5
- Dynamic Ju Jitsu ISBN 0-920129-00-5
