= Seishiro Okazaki =

Japanese healer and martial artist

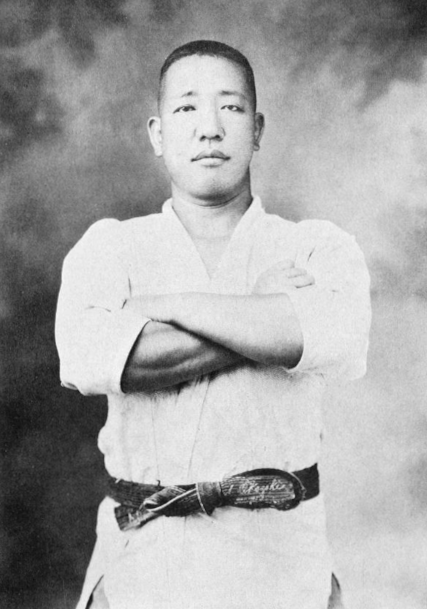
- Born: January 28, 1890; Kakeda, Fukushima, Japan
- Died: July 12, 1951 (aged 61); Honolulu, Hawaii, US
- Style: Danzan-ryū Jujitsu, Yōshin-ryū
- Teachers: Wo Chung, Tanaka Yoshimatsu
- Rank: 10th degree black belt in Danzan-ryū Jujitsu; 3rd degree black belt in Judo

Other information
- Notable students: Siegfried Kufferath, Wally Jay, John Cahill, Charles Kalani, Jr.

Seishiro "Henry" Okazaki (岡崎 星史郎); January 28, 1890 – July 12, 1951) was a Japanese healer, martial artist, and founder of Danzan Ryu jujitsu.

== Biography ==
Born in Kakeda, Date County in Fukushima Prefecture, Japan, he immigrated to Hawaii in 1906. (Note: Immigration records show he arrived at the port of Honolulu T.H. on September 10, 1906 aboard the Steamer China of the Pacific Mail S.S. Co.) At the age of 19 he learned he had tuberculosis. Through hard training in the martial arts, Okazaki recovered completely and vowed to dedicate his life to propagating jujutsu and judo. From 1927 to 1928, Okazaki developed a complete, integrated martial arts system: Danzan Ryu Jujutsu. A synthesis of several older styles of jujutsu, Okazaki included in the system elements of his studies of Judo, Okinawan karate, Chinese kung-fu, Hawaiian Lua, Filipino knife fighting (escrima), boxing and wrestling, as well as traditional Japanese restorative massage and healing techniques (Seifukujutsu).

Gradually, Okazaki developed a system comprising courses for men, women, and children. In his system, he stressed the ancient system of philosophical and moral training within the martial and restorative arts. He is credited with being the first to teach the full jujutsu course to non-Asians. He also taught perhaps the first women's self-defense course in the country. He founded the American Jujitsu Institute in the Territory of Hawaii in 1939. This is the original Danzan Ryu Jujitsu organization and remains in operation to the present day. In addition to his work in martial arts, he was also very well known for his healing arts.

Okazaki initially faced opposition within the Japanese-American community for teaching outsiders Japanese martial arts. This changed after World War II. Like tens of thousands of other Japanese-Americans, Okazaki was interned during the war. He was incarcerated at Honouliuli Internment Camp. Unlike others, however, his home and property were not looted; his students guarded them during the war. Upon their release, Okazaki helped support others in the Japanese-American community. For this he ultimately gained their respect.

He died at his home in Honolulu on July 12, 1951. Current descendant (2025) is Eric Okazaki, the great grandson who lives on Oahu and bears a resemblance to Seishiro Okazaki. Eric is currently a longtime VP at Kamehameha Schools Kapalama.

== As a healer ==
In addition to the martial disciplines, Okazaki studied health sciences and physical therapy, and ultimately gained a reputation as a healer of the sick and injured. In 1930, Okazaki opened the Nikko Sanatorium of Restoration Massage in Honolulu, which is still in operation today. Many famous personalities of the times came to the Sanatorium to meet, be taught by or be treated by Okazaki, including Beatrice Burns, the wife of Hawaii Governor John A. Burns, who gave their son the middle name "Seishiro" in Okazaki's honor. Among the most famous were President Franklin D. Roosevelt, actress Shirley Temple, actor George Burns, and Olympic athlete, actor Johnny Weissmuller.
