= Danzan-ryū =

Hawaiian martial art of Japanese origin

Danzan-Ryū
- Also known as: Kodenkan Danzan-Ryū
- Date founded: c. 1925
- Country of origin: Territory of Hawaii
- Founder: Seishiro Okazaki
- Arts taught: Kappo, Seifukujutsu
- Ancestor arts: Jujutsu (Yōshin-ryū, Namba Shoshin-ryū, Iwaga-ryū, Kosogabe-ryū), Judo, Kapu Kuialua, Shōrin-ryū Karate, Chin Na, Boxing, Arnis, Folk Wrestling
- Descendant arts: Small Circle Jujitsu, Kajukenbo, Kaito Gakko,
- Descendant schools: Hikari Ryuza Do Kan

Danzan-ryū (檀山流) is a ryū of jujutsu founded by Seishiro Okazaki (1890–1951) in Hawaii. Danzan-ryū jujutsu is of mainly Japanese origin but is most common on the West Coast of the United States. The Danzan-ryū syllabus is syncretic and includes non-Japanese elements.

== History ==
Seishiro Okazaki was born in Fukushima Prefecture, Japan in 1890. In 1906, he immigrated to the island of Hawaii. Soon after, he was afflicted with a pulmonary condition which may have been tuberculosis. During this time, young Okazaki began studying under a Yōshin-ryū jujutsu sensei by the name of Yoshimatsu Tanaka in Hilo, Hawaii. Okazaki assiduously pursued his studies under Tanaka and after some time found that his respiratory condition had gone into remission. Okazaki felt that the study of martial arts had played a large role in his physical recovery and as a result, he decided to dedicate his life to the study and teaching of jujutsu and related disciplines.

Okazaki later adopted the Western first name, Henry.

In 1924, Okazaki returned to Japan and undertook a study of the various schools, or ryū-ha, of the then most popular Jūjutsu styles of Yōshin-ryū, Namba-Shoshin Ryū, Iwaga Ryū, Kosogabe Ryū, Kōdōkan Jūdō, and several others. Later that year when he returned to the Hawaiian Islands, he continued the study of jūjutsu under the various masters who had emigrated from Japan to Hawaii. Incorporating not only traditional jūjutsu, but also Lua, Shōrin-ryū Karate, Eskrima, Boxing, Chin Na and Folk Wrestling, he began to synthesize the most effective aspects of these various styles into an eclectic system which he called Danzan Ryū. Prof. Okazaki used this name to honor his Chinese martial arts teacher, Wo Chong. The Chinese name for Hawai'i is T'an Shan (檀山). When used in Japanese, these kanji are pronounced Dan Zan. Their literal meaning is "sandalwood mountain".

=== First classes ===
Professor Okazaki's school was founded in Honolulu, Hawi'i. The name Kodenkan (古伝館) can be translated as 'The School of the Ancient Tradition'. Prof. Okazaki's method of instruction prescribed that the seniors teach their junior students in a spirit of mutual aid. Professor Okazaki declared this method of instruction to be the founding philosophy of the discipline.

This form of teaching perfectly embodies the KOKUA concept, which in Hawaiian means to help each other. Prof. Okazaki was willing to teach his arts to people of non-Asian origin as well as to women. This was frowned upon by the Asian community in Hawaii at the time. . By all accounts the original classes were grueling, and as below, Okazaki taught different courses to different individuals. Around the time of the founding of Danzan Ryu, it took approximately four years to earn a Shodan ranking. During this time students trained 6–7 days a week.

=== Seifukujutsu ===
"Upon completing about a year of study," Okazaki wrote in his Esoteric Principles (contained in the Mokuroku scroll given to his pupils who mastered his system), "I acquired a body of iron" (paraphrased), so he dedicated his life to the study of martial arts and the healing techniques associated with each style he took up. Some among his students carried on his healing traditions. In 1984 third and fourth generation devotees standardized his style of massage from notes by Okazaki's students into the AJJF certification program in Okazaki Restorative Massage (recognized by the AOBTA as ORM, but also known as Okazaki Long Life, Nikko Restorative Massage).

=== World War II and later ===
Shortly after the Japanese attack on Pearl Harbor, on December 7, 1941, Prof. Okazaki was allegedly interned for six months. This is alleged, but not substantiated through FOIA requests to the U.S. Government. It is possible that he was only held under arrest and not placed in an internment camp. He was released relatively quickly because of the intervention of Curley Freedman who used his FBI contacts to aid in Prof. Okazaki's release. Curley was the first tile contractor in Honolulu, and installed tile in the homes and businesses of many Japanese. Because of his craftsmanship, he was well- liked and widely known. The FBI asked Prof. Okazaki for his assistance in identifying Japanese fishing boats that may have been contacting Japanese submarines and relaying information about U.S. Navy activity in Pearl Harbor. The FBI would also ask Bud Estes, who worked for Curley in the tile business, to assist in identifying drug dealers on another island during the harvest period. As Bud had knowledge of the island from his Salvation Army missionary days, he agreed and assisted the FBI until his cover was blown.

Prof. Okazaki was also fortunate in that his dojo was unmolested, as his students protected it from looters who ransacked Japanese homes and businesses. Because of the preservation of his assets, he was able to lend aid to the Asian community, members of which had formerly shunned him. In this way he became accepted by them.

During wartime, Prof. Okazaki continued teaching and also assisted the US military in creating a hand-to-hand combat curriculum based largely on the 120 Commando Technique list. Ironically, at the same time, Gichin Funakoshi, the father of modern Karate, was responsible for hand-to-hand training of many members of the Japanese military. Prof. Okazaki is sometimes said to have been responsible for the WWII US Army Field Combatives Manual FM 21-150, but that manual credits members of the American Judo Club of New York City.

== Illness and death ==
Prof. Okazaki suffered a stroke in July 1948, from which he recovered somewhat in 1949, when he continued teaching. Prof. Okazaki died on July 12, 1951, at the age of sixty-two.

== Today ==
There are many other Danzan Ryū and DZR-influenced organizations which have developed over time and are now separated into various schools of thought. The most widely known international federations today are the American Jujitsu Institute, Jujitsu America, the American Judo and Jujitsu Federation, and Small Circle Jujitsu.

=== The American Jujitsu Institute ===
The original Danzan Ryū organization was the American Jujitsu Institute (AJI) founded by Prof. Okazaki in 1939. The AJI is the oldest martial arts organization in the United States. The AJI has continued to the present day, and is currently under the direction of its President, Professor Daniel W. Saragosa and Vice President Sensei Scott Horiuchi. Its patronage and sponsorship of the major Danzan Ryu projects over the past two decades have proved crucial to its success.

=== The American Judo and Jujitsu Federation ===
The American Judo and Jujitsu Federation (AJJF) was founded in 1948 by Bud Estes, Richard Rickerts, John Cahill and Ray Law. In 1958, the AJJF was incorporated in the State of California as a non-profit organization. (Active Cal. Corp. C0353438, 4/21/1958; Cal. Sec. State, Business Search 5/19/2008)

The AJJF promotes Danzan-ryū jujitsu with a standardized curriculum used by a variety of jujitsu, judo and other dojos. This curriculum is intended to combine martial arts training with an ethical and moral philosophy.

=== Small Circle Jujitsu ===
Wally Jay had studied boxing, weightlifting, judo and jujitsu from various instructors before 1944, when he received his black belt in Kodenkan Danzan Ryu Jujitsu from Okazaki. Small Circle Jujitsu™ evolved from combining many sources and elements, but owes its roots to Ken Kawachi, the Hawaiian judo champion for many years. Sensei Kawachi was a physically small man who stressed the use of the wrist action to gain superior leverage. So effective was he in using the subtleties of the grip and its leverage that he routinely dominated other judoka twice his mass and defeated many visiting wrestlers and other grapplers from the mainland. That wrist action became the key to Small Circle Jujitsu and continues to evolve as Jay and others enhance the style with their knowledge. In August 2002, Wally Jay held the ceremony officially handing the title of Grandmaster over to his son Leon Jay in his hometown of Alameda, California.

=== Kaito Gakko ===
Kaito Gakko was formed under David Kawaikoolihilihi Nu'uhiwa, who studied with Okazaki starting in 1938, and John Cahill, (Danzan-Ryu's sensei, during Okazaki's internment.) After a fighting career with more than 100 consecutive undefeated matches, Professor Nuuhiwa blended his real world fighting experiences, including death matches in Africa and Asia, with his training in Danzan-Ryu Jujitsu, Karate, Aikido, Makaho, and Lua, and started teaching self-defense classes under the name 'Kaito Gakko', a title he was given in Japan in 1958, upon receiving a 12th Dan in karate. Kaito literally means “The Best of the East and West.” He was awarded the legendary Red Belt in Japan. At the time, he was one of only five in the world to hold this rank and the first American ever to hold this honor. David was also an expert in the ancient Hawaiian fighting art of Lua and a healing arts practitioner. Many professional athletes, including Sugar Ray Leonard, came to Nu'uhiwa for pre-fight training, or physical therapy. David Nu'uhiwa Sr. died on January 21, 2005, in Honolulu, Hawai’i after a courageous battle with cancer. Today, his Kaito Gakko school, aloha and teachings are carried on by Professor Nu'uhiwa's students: Kalani Akui (President of Kaito Gakko), Alyxzander Bear (Vice President of Kaito Gakko), Bruce Keaulani of 'Kaito Gakko Nu'uhiwa Ryu' in Oahu, Hawaii, and Carlos Gallegos of 'Kaito Gakko Martial Arts' in Orange County, California.

=== Kodenkan Yudanshakai ===
The Kodenkan Yudanshakai, founded in 1967 by Joseph Holck, is a traditional martial arts association with locations in major metropolitan areas of Arizona. The Kodenkan Yudanshakai was founded by Joseph Holck and his family in 1967 to continue the school founded by Joseph's Brother Roy Holck in 1962. The Yudanshakai teaches such martial arts as Danzan Ryū Jūjutsu, Shorin-ryū Karate, Matsuno Ryu Goshinjitsu, Nihon Jujitsu, Kodenkan Bokkendo, Hiraido Jujitsu, Northern Praying Mantis Kung Fu, Judo, and other arts. The Kodenkan Yudanshakai has grown over the years and presently has dojos in Arizona, Hawaii, California and Montana, including six in the Tucson-Phoenix metro area. The organization continues its perpetuation of the martial arts under the guidance of Joseph Holck and his family; Vinson Holck, Barry Holck, Meleana Holck-Tomooka, Amy Holck, Aaron Holck, Emmet Holck, Joyce Holck, Wilbert Holck, and Willard Holck.

=== Shoshin Ryu Yudanshakai ===
Shoshin Ryu Yudanshakai was founded by Michael Chubb to provide an educational, athletic, and recreational outlet to aid the physical, moral, and social development of adults and children within the framework of the sport and martial art of Danzan Ryu Jujitsu. It was incorporated in 1987 in the State of California and has been instrumental in the creation and maintenance of several inter-organizational projects, including the Ohana weekends, the Danzan Ryu Hall of Fame and the H.S. Okazaki National Jujitsu Championships.

=== Jujitsu America ===
In 1978 Wally Jay, John Chow-Hoon, Carl Beaver and Willy Cahill created Jujitsu America. They seceded from the Hawaiian-based American Jujitsu Institute (which was the Kodenkan organization) after a conflict of ideologies and methodologies. This group represented the mainland jujitsuka who decided to break away from the old organization. The Hawaiian leaders wished to perpetuate the traditions of the Kodenkan system while the statesiders wanted to update and improve their fighting skills to reflect certain modern realities. The objects and purposes of Jujitsu America shall be to promote and foster the development and cultivation of a better understanding of the art and science of Jujitsu among its members; and to promote and propagate the teachings and philosophies of the recognized and established systems of Jujitsu in America and affiliate International Unions of Jujitsu. It is further the intent and purpose of Jujitsu America to encourage a systematic practice of modern Kodenkan Jujitsu and related arts, in honor of the founder of Kodenkan Jujitsu, Henry Okazaki. Jujitsu America has recently affiliated with the United States Judo Association (USJA) to promote their Sport Jujitsu programme.

=== KDRJA ===
The Kodenkan Danzan-Ryū Jujitsu Association (KDRJA) was proposed by Professor Kiehl in 1978. That same year, Professors Kiehl, Ancho and Kufferath founded the Kodenkan Danzan Ryu Jujitsu Association or KDRJA. The Founders established a Board of three (3) Elders to direct the organization. The original elders were Profs. Ancho, Kufferath and Janovich. It is now known as the Board of Professors, Profs Doug and Jane Kiehl and Prof. Tony Janovich. Other individuals awarded the title of “Professor” by the KDRJA serve to advise the Board of Professors.

The Founders’ objective was to create an organization whose collective consciousness reflected the spirit and teachings of Danzan Ryu. Its mission is: 1. To provide students with guidelines and a road map for understanding and practicing the ancient arts and sciences of Kodenkan Danzan Ryu Jujitsu as taught by H. Seishiro Okazaki. 2. To carry-on the teaching and perspective of the late Kufferath and Ancho. 3. Support the activities of the Danzan Alliance.

KODENKAN DANZAN RYU HOMBU DOJO Founded by Prof. Ramon Ancho Jr in 1990 in Costa Rica, it was a martial arts teaching center and SEIFUKUJUTSU therapy center. Prof. Ancho had 4 students who made up the body of instructors: Shihan Moises Muñoz, Shihan Berny Carvajal, Shihan Fabián Merino and Shihan Randall Sanchez.

CARVAJAL´S MARTIAL ARTS DOJO Founded by Shihan Berny Carvajal 28 years ago. Direct student of Professor Ramon Ancho Jr, he was the Technical Director of KODENKAN HOMBU in Costa Rica. Currently a 7th Dan black belt and the title of Professor, awarded by AJI. This organization was designated by AJI as the current Hombu Dojo of Danzan Ryu in Costa Rica and Central America, where the promoted Professor Randall Sánchez is in charge of the instruction program based on the program of Prof. Ramon Ancho.

SEIFUKUJUTSU COSTA RICA INSTITUTE Seifukujutsu study and therapy center. Danzan Ryu Fifth Dan and Professor Randall Sanchez has run this center for more than 20 years in Costa Rica, providing rehabilitation and therapy to athletes in the Central American region. He has dedicated his life to preserving the techniques, legacy and tradition of Professor Okazaki, who taught them to Prof. Ancho. Prof. Ancho had Professor Randall as his disciple for more than 15 years and was able to teach him and prepare him for this task. This preparation was taught at the KODENKAN HOMBU in Costa Rica.

KODENKAN ITALIA founded by Sensei Marco Longo student of Daniel Saragosa AJI President, Gary Jones and Herb Lague, after learning and hold black belt in Kyokushindo, Kajukenbo, Kenpo Karate, Lima Lama, Hapkido and Jeet Kune Do Full Instructor.Kodenkan Italia Is the First and the only one DanZan Ryu Jujitsu and Kosho Ryu Kempo Dojo located in Italy.

Bill Beach's Hawaiian Jiu-Jitsu System, Inc., as well as The Southern California Jujitsu Association founded in 1979 by James A. Marcinkus (deceased).

=== Christian Jujitsu Association ===
The Christian Jujitsu Association was founded by Gene Edwards. The Christian Jujitsu Association is a Danzan Ryū organization including the Christian religion.

=== KaishinKai ===
KaishinKai translates as 'gathering of open minds'. The goal of KaishinKai Dojo is to train quality instructors that will propagate the teachings of Henry S. Okazaki and the Kodenkan Danzan-ryu system of Jujitsu. KaishinKai was founded by Ron Jennings in 1978 and consists of affiliate dojos and students primarily in the Pacific Northwest. The KaishinKai Dojo itself is also registered with the American Jujitsu Institute, Jujitsu America, and the ShoshinRyu Yudanshakai.

=== The Bushidokan Federation ===
The Bushidokan Federation is a union of dojos from around the world practicing the art of Dan Zan Ryu Zenyo Bujitsu. This system was originated by Herb Lague (student of Bud Estes) who began his martial arts studies in 1950, studying Boxing, Judo, Savate, Aikido, Lama Pai, and Jujitsu. Dan Zan Ryu Zenyo Bujutsu was formulated from these systems and uses a framework of Danzan Ryu Jujitsu to teach the principles of Zenyo throughout the system. While upholding certain principles common to many dojos, each dojo in the Bushidokan Federation retains its own autonomy and recognizes the sensei of each dojo as the head instructor. Member dojos are currently in Canada, Colombia, Ecuador, Israel, Italy, Russia, Saudi Arabia, Thailand, Serbia/Yugoslavia, and the United States (Alaska, California, Florida, Hawaii, Maine, Oklahoma, Georgia, and Nevada & CEBU PHILIPPINES).

=== Kodenkan Ohana Alliance ===
The Kodenkan Ohana Alliance is a group of autonomous Kodenkan Danzan-Ryu Jujitsu and affiliated organizations dedicated to the principles handed down by Henry S. Okazaki and aligning themselves to the Ohana family and actively supporting the Ohana convention event. This group is responsible for planning and implementing the Ohana convention.

=== Zen Budokai Jujitsu ===
Zen Budokai Aiki Jujitsu was founded by Raymond "Duke" Moore who began his training in the 1940s with Ray Law. Moore received advanced black belts in karate, judo, and jujitsu and by the 1960s had formulated his system which was influenced by his direct training with Ray Law (jujitsu), George Yoshida (judo), Kiyose Nakae (jujitsu), Mitz Kimura (judo), Richard Kim (karate and jujitsu), Hidetaka Nishiyama (karate), and Masutatsu Oyama (karate). Today, the system consists of approximately a dozen schools most of which are in California and New England. Zen Budokai focuses on practical jujitsu and self-defense and is taught by 9th dan (and current system leader) Tim Delgman at the San Francisco dojo and 9th dan Jim Moses at Stanford University at the Stanford Jujitsu Club.

=== Kilohana Martial Arts Association ===
Kilohana Martial Arts Association is a non-profit organization founded in 1996 to perpetuate the teachings of Professor Sig Kufferath and Professor Seishiro Okazaki, as well as to promote the study of other martial disciplines. He sponsors and supports a number of tournaments and training events throughout the year, most of which are open to members and non-members. The name “Kilohana” means being made of the finest material and having superior character, honor and integrity. In their coat of arms, the Hawaiian words “Mokomoko Ku’i Lima Po’okela Kilohana” means being the finest champion in the art of hand-to-hand combat. The name and image were created by Professor Sig Kufferath.

== Events ==
The most focal event of the post-Okazaki era in Danzan-Ryū is the biannual Ohana Celebration. This event includes members from all of the organizations focused on the teachings of Okazaki. The organizations come together for a weekend of clinics, competition, and camaraderie to share the Kodenkan spirit. Ohana was founded in 1990 by Shoshin Ryu Yudanshakai instructors Mike Chubb, Bill Fischer and Roger Medlen, and is hosted by a different organization each time. It is usually held on Labor Day weekend.

Other past events include the two Kodenkan Okugi classes held in Santa Clara, CA. These two events, one in the summer of 1993 and one in the winter of 2003, brought a number of Danzan-Ryū instructors together to learn the system from Sig Kufferath and his senior student Tony Janovich. Kufferath had been a graduate of the same class held in 1948 under the direction of Okazaki. Over the many years, the methods of performing Okazaki's arts had diverged into a number of different styles. This class, whose contents were designed by Janovich under the direction of Kufferath, was designed to show interested instructors how the arts had been done by Okazaki according to Kufferath, and how he had modified several arts. Students were instructed in all of the combat arts as well as the eleven required methods of resuscitation. The students who graduated from these classes were awarded Kaiden no Sho, or complete transmission certificates, and were given the title of either Renshi (trainer), Kyoshi (teacher) or Shihan (master). Before Kufferath's death in 1999, he and Janovich had planned to hold a second class in 2003, ten years after the previous class. This had been the plan of Okazaki after his 1948 class, but his death in 1951 prevented this. Janovich carried out the plan and held this class in January and February 2003. This class has been held in 2013 and in 2023.

Note 1: Other classes that have been called "okugi" have taken place, but were not sanctioned by Kufferath.

Note 2: Okazaki's 1948 class was called the "special Sunday class" and not the Okugi class. The name "Okugi Class" was coined and copyrighted by Tony Janovich.
