= Durnin =

Durnin is a surname. Notable people with the surname include:

- John Durnin (Scottish footballer) (1894–?)
- John Durnin (born 1965), British footballer
- Pat Durnin (born 1959), Canadian speed skater

== See also ==
- Durbin (surname)
- Durning, a surname
