= October 19 =

October 19 this year in various calendars
- Monday, 19 October 2026
| Akan | Monodwo |
| Armenian | 1 Trē 1476 |
| Aztec | Izcalli 17, 10 Itzcuintli |
| Babylonian | 6 Tashritu, 2337 SE |
| Balinese pawukon | Menga, Kajeng, Menala, Wage, Maulu, Coma of Dukut, Yama, Erangan, Dewa |
| Bengali | 3 Kartik, BS 1433 |
| Chinese | Yang Fire Tiger・Heart Mansion; Fire Horse Year, Month 9, Day 10 (Hanlu, 4 days until Shuangjiang) |
| Common Era | 19 October 2026 CE |
| Coptic | 9 Paopi, AM 1743 |
| Egyptian | 6 Phamenoth, 2775 NE |
| Ethiopian | 9 Ṭeqemt, 2019 Amätä Məhrät |
| French Republican | Décade III, Septidi de Vendémiaire de l'Année 235 de la République |
| Gregorian | 19 October, AD 2026 |
| Hebrew | 8 Cheshvan, AM 5787 |
| Hindu | Uttarāṣāḍha・Dhṛti; Solar: 2 Kārtika, 1948 SE; Lunisolar: Adhika Aṣṭamī, Śukla pakṣa of Āśvina, 2083 VE; Rāudra・5127 KY・1,872,867 |
| Icelandic | Mánudagur, 26 Haustmánuður 2026 |
| Islamic | 7 Jumada al-awwal, AH 1448 (using tabular method) |
| ISO week date | 2026-W43-1 |
| Japanese | 9 Nagatsuki, Reiwa 8 (Kanro, 4 days until Sōkō) |
| Julian | 6 October, AD 2026 (AM 7535) |
| Julian day | 2461333 |
| Korean | 9 Gaedal, 4359 DE |
| Maya | 13.0.14.0.10; 3 Zac, 10 Oc |
| Roman | Pridie Nonas Octobres, MMDCCLXXIX AUC |
| Solar Hijri | 27 Mehr, SH 1405 |
| Tibetan | 9 tha skar, me pho rta 2153 or 1772 or 1000 |

| << | October | | | | | >> |
| Su | Mo | Tu | We | Th | Fr | Sa |
| | | | | 1 | 2 | 3 |
| 4 | 5 | 6 | 7 | 8 | 9 | 10 |
| 11 | 12 | 13 | 14 | 15 | 16 | 17 |
| 18 | 19 | 20 | 21 | 22 | 23 | 24 |
| 25 | 26 | 27 | 28 | 29 | 30 | 31 |
2026

October 19 in recent years
2026 (Monday)
2025 (Sunday)
2024 (Saturday)
2023 (Thursday)
2022 (Wednesday)
2021 (Tuesday)
2020 (Monday)
2019 (Saturday)
2018 (Friday)
2017 (Thursday)

October 19 is the 292nd day of the year (293rd in leap years) in the Gregorian calendar; 73 days remain until the end of the year.

== Events ==
=== Pre-1600 ===
- 202 BC – Second Punic War: At the Battle of Zama, Roman legions under Scipio Africanus defeat Hannibal Barca, leader of the army defending Carthage.
- 439 – The Vandals, led by King Gaiseric, take Carthage in North Africa in a surprise attack in breach of treaty.
- 615 – Consecration of Pope Adeodatus I following the imperial approval of his election.
- 1386 – The Universität Heidelberg holds its first lecture, making it the oldest German university.
- 1453 – Hundred Years' War: Three months after the Battle of Castillon, England loses its last possessions in southern France.
- 1466 – The Thirteen Years' War between Poland and the Teutonic Order ends with the Second Treaty of Thorn.
- 1469 – Ferdinand II of Aragon marries Isabella I of Castile, a marriage that paves the way to the unification of Aragon and Castile into a single country, Spain.
- 1512 – Martin Luther becomes a doctor of theology.
- 1579 – James VI of Scotland is celebrated as an adult ruler by a festival in Edinburgh.
- 1596 – The Spanish ship San Felipe runs aground on the coast of Japan and its cargo is confiscated by local authorities.

=== 1601–1900 ===
- 1649 – New Ross town in Ireland surrenders to Oliver Cromwell.
- 1662 – An English Buccaneer force led by Royal Navy commodore Christopher Myngs launches an attack on Santiago de Cuba which is subsequently sacked.
- 1781 – American Revolutionary War: The siege of Yorktown comes to an end with the British surrender.
- 1789 – John Jay is sworn in as the first Chief Justice of the United States.
- 1791 – Treaty of Drottningholm, between Sweden and Russia
- 1805 – War of the Third Coalition: Austrian General Mack surrenders his army to Napoleon at the Battle of Ulm.
- 1812 – The French invasion of Russia fails when Napoleon begins his retreat from Moscow.
- 1813 – War of the Sixth Coalition: Napoleon is forced to retreat from Germany after the Battle of Leipzig.
- 1847 – The novel Jane Eyre is published in London.
- 1864 – American Civil War: The Battle of Cedar Creek ends the last Confederate threat to Washington, DC.
- 1864 – American Civil War: Confederate agents based in Canada rob three banks in Saint Albans, Vermont.
- 1866 – In accordance with the Treaty of Vienna, Austria cedes Veneto and Mantua to France, which immediately awards them to Italy in exchange for the earlier Italian acquiescence to the French annexation of Savoy and Nice.
- 1900 – Max Planck discovers Planck's law of black-body radiation.

=== 1901–present ===
- 1912 – Italo-Turkish War: Italy takes possession of what is now Libya from the Ottoman Empire.
- 1914 – World War I: The First Battle of Ypres begins.
- 1921 – The Portuguese Prime Minister and several officials are murdered in the Bloody Night coup.
- 1922 – British Conservative MPs vote to terminate the coalition government with the Liberal Party.
- 1935 – The League of Nations places economic sanctions on Italy for its invasion of Ethiopia.
- 1936 – New York World-Telegram reporter Herbert Ekins won a race against two other New York newspaper journalists to travel around the world on commercial airline flights. He accomplished the feat in 18 ½ days. His opponents were New York Evening Journal reporter Dorothy Kilgallen, who finished in second place, and New York Times reporter Leo Kieran.
- 1943 – The cargo vessel Sinfra is attacked by Allied aircraft at Crete and sunk. Two thousand and ninety-eight Italian prisoners of war drown with it.
- 1943 – Streptomycin, the first antibiotic remedy for tuberculosis, is isolated by researchers at Rutgers University.
- 1944 – United States forces land in the Philippines.
- 1944 – A coup is launched against Juan Federico Ponce Vaides, beginning the ten-year Guatemalan Revolution.
- 1948 – Presidents North Carolina Gave the Nation, a monument honoring three presidents of the United States, was dedicated at the North Carolina State Capitol in Raleigh, North Carolina.
- 1950 – China defeats the Tibetan Army at Chambo.
- 1950 – Korean War: The Battle of Pyongyang ends in a United Nations victory. Hours later, the Chinese Army begins crossing the border into Korea.
- 1950 – Iran becomes the first country to accept technical assistance from the United States under the Point Four Program.
- 1953 – Ray Bradbury's Fahrenheit 451 is published.
- 1955 – The General Assembly of the European Broadcasting Union approves the staging of the first Eurovision Song Contest.
- 1956 – The Soviet Union and Japan sign a Joint Declaration, officially ending the state of war between the two countries that had existed since August 1945.
- 1960 – The United States imposes a near-total trade embargo against Cuba.
- 1973 – President Nixon rejects an Appeals Court decision that he turn over the Watergate tapes.
- 1974 – Niue becomes a self-governing colony of New Zealand.
- 1986 – The president of Mozambique and a prominent leader of FRELIMO, along with 33 others, die when their aircraft crashes into the Lebombo Mountains.
- 1987 – The United States Navy conducts Operation Nimble Archer, an attack on two Iranian oil platforms in the Persian Gulf.
- 1987 – Black Monday: The Dow Jones Industrial Average falls by 22%, 508 points.
- 1988 – The British government imposes a broadcasting ban on television and radio interviews with members of Sinn Féin and eleven Irish republican and Ulster loyalist paramilitary groups.
- 1989 – The convictions of the Guildford Four are quashed by the Court of Appeal of England and Wales, after they had spent 15 years in prison.
- 2001 – SIEV X, an Indonesian fishing boat en route to Christmas Island, carrying over 400 migrants, sinks in international waters with the loss of 353 people.
- 2003 – Mother Teresa is beatified by Pope John Paul II.
- 2004 – Thirteen people are killed when Corporate Airlines Flight 5966 crashes in Adair County, Missouri, while on approach to Kirksville Regional Airport.
- 2005 – Saddam Hussein goes on trial in Baghdad for crimes against humanity.
- 2005 – Hurricane Wilma becomes the most intense Atlantic hurricane on record with a minimum pressure of 882 mb.
- 2012 – A bomb explosion kills eight people and injures 110 more in Lebanon.
- 2013 – One hundred and five people are injured in a train crash in Buenos Aires.
- 2019 – Members of Parliament met at the House of Lords to discuss the United Kingdom's Brexit deal, this was the first Saturday sitting in Parliament since 3 April 1982 during the Falklands War.
- 2025 – Pieces of the French Crown Jewels are successfully stolen during a heist on the Louvre Museum in Paris.

== Births ==
=== Pre-1600 ===
- 879 – Yingtian, empress of the Khitan Liao Dynasty (died 953)
- 1276 – Prince Hisaaki of Japan (died 1328)
- 1433 – Marsilio Ficino, Italian astrologer and philosopher (died 1499)
- 1507 – Viglius, Dutch politician (died 1577)
- 1545 – John Juvenal Ancina, Italian Oratorian and bishop (died 1604)
- 1582 – Dmitry of Uglich, Russian crown prince and saint (died 1591)

=== 1601–1900 ===
- 1605 – Thomas Browne, English physician and author (died 1682)
- 1609 – Gerrard Winstanley, English Protestant religious reformer (died 1676)
- 1610 – James Butler, 1st Duke of Ormonde, English-Irish general, academic, and politician, Lord Lieutenant of Ireland (died 1688)
- 1613 – Charles of Sezze, Italian Franciscan friar and saint (died 1670)
- 1658 – Adolphus Frederick II, Duke of Mecklenburg-Strelitz (died 1704)
- 1676 – Rodrigo Anes de Sá Almeida e Meneses, 1st Marquis of Abrantes, Portuguese diplomat (died 1733)
- 1680 – John Abernethy, Irish minister (died 1740)
- 1688 – William Cheselden, English surgeon and anatomist (died 1752)
- 1718 – Victor-François, 2nd duc de Broglie, French general and politician, French Secretary of State for War (died 1804)
- 1720 – John Woolman, American-English preacher, journalist, and activist (died 1772)
- 1721 – Joseph de Guignes, French orientalist and sinologist (died 1800)
- 1784 – Leigh Hunt, English poet and critic (died 1859)
- 1789 – Theophilos Kairis, Greek priest and philosopher (died 1853)
- 1810 – Cassius Marcellus Clay, American journalist, lawyer, and diplomat, United States Ambassador to Russia (died 1903)
- 1814 – Theodoros Vryzakis, Greek painter (died 1878)
- 1826 – Ralph Tollemache, English priest (died 1895)
- 1850 – Annie Smith Peck, American mountaineer and academic (died 1935)
- 1858 – George Albert Boulenger, Belgian-English zoologist and botanist (died 1937)
- 1862 – Auguste Lumière, French director and producer (died 1954)
- 1868 – Bertha Knight Landes, American academic and politician, Mayor of Seattle (died 1943)
- 1873 – Jaap Eden, Dutch speed skater and cyclist (died 1925)
- 1873 – Bart King, American cricketer (died 1965)
- 1876 – Mordecai Brown, American baseball player, coach, and manager (died 1945)
- 1876 – Mihkel Pung, Estonian lawyer and politician, 11th Estonian Minister of Foreign Affairs (died 1941)
- 1879 – Emma Bell Miles, American writer, poet, and artist (died 1919)
- 1882 – Umberto Boccioni, Italian painter and sculptor (died 1916)
- 1885 – Charles E. Merrill, American banker and philanthropist, co-founded Merrill Lynch Wealth Management (died 1956)
- 1895 – Frank Durbin, American soldier (died 1999)
- 1895 – Lewis Mumford, American historian, sociologist, and philosopher (died 1990)
- 1896 – Bob O'Farrell, American baseball player and manager (died 1988)
- 1897 – Salimuzzaman Siddiqui, Pakistani chemist and scholar (died 1994)
- 1899 – Miguel Ángel Asturias, Guatemalan journalist, author, and poet, Nobel Prize laureate (died 1974)
- 1900 – Erna Berger, German soprano and actress (died 1990)
- 1900 – Bill Ponsford, Australian cricketer and baseball player (died 1991)
- 1900 – Roy Worters, Canadian ice hockey player (died 1957)

=== 1901–present ===
- 1901 – Arleigh Burke, American admiral (died 1996)
- 1903 – Tor Johnson, Swedish wrestler and actor (died 1971)
- 1907 – Roger Wolfe Kahn, American bandleader and composer (died 1962)
- 1908 – Geirr Tveitt, Norwegian pianist and composer (died 1981)
- 1909 – Marguerite Perey, French physicist and academic (died 1975)
- 1910 – Subrahmanyan Chandrasekhar, Indian-American astrophysicist, astronomer, and mathematician, Nobel Prize laureate (died 1995)
- 1910 – Shunkichi Hamada, Japanese field hockey player (died 2009)
- 1910 – Paul Robert, French lexicographer and publisher (died 1980)
- 1910 – Farid al-Atrash, Syrian actor and singer (died 1980)
- 1913 – Vinicius de Moraes, Brazilian poet, playwright, and composer (died 1980)
- 1914 – Juanita Moore, American actress (died 2014)
- 1916 – Jean Dausset, French-Spanish immunologist and academic, Nobel Prize laureate (died 2009)
- 1916 – Emil Gilels, Ukrainian-Russian pianist (died 1985)
- 1916 – Minoru Yasui, American soldier, lawyer, and activist (died 1986)
- 1917 – William Joel Blass, American soldier, lawyer, and politician (died 2012)
- 1917 – Walter Munk, Austrian-American oceanographer, author, and academic (died 2019)
- 1917 – Sharadchandra Shankar Shrikhande, Indian mathematician (died 2020)
- 1918 – Charles Evans, English-Welsh mountaineer, surgeon, and educator (died 1995)
- 1918 – Russell Kirk, American theorist and author (died 1994)
- 1918 – Robert Schwarz Strauss, American lawyer and diplomat, United States Ambassador to Russia (died 2014)
- 1920 – Peter Aduja, Filipino-American politician (died 2007)
- 1920 – Pandurang Shastri Athavale, Indian activist, philosopher, and spiritual leader (died 2003)
- 1920 – LaWanda Page, American actress (died 2002)
- 1920 – Harry Alan Towers, English-Canadian screenwriter and producer (died 2009)
- 1921 – George Nader, American actor (died 2002)
- 1922 – Jack Anderson, American journalist and author (died 2005)
- 1923 – Ruth Carter Stevenson, American art collector, founded the Amon Carter Museum of American Art (died 2013)
- 1923 – Baby Dalupan, Filipino basketball player and coach (died 2016)
- 1925 – Bernard Hepton, English actor and producer (died 2018)
- 1925 – Czesław Kiszczak, Polish general and politician, 11th Prime Minister of the People's Republic of Poland (died 2015)
- 1925 – Emilio Eduardo Massera, Argentinian admiral (died 2010)
- 1926 – Arne Bendiksen, Norwegian singer-songwriter and producer (died 2009)
- 1926 – Joel Feinberg, American philosopher and academic (died 2004)
- 1926 – Vladimir Shlapentokh, Ukrainian-American sociologist, historian, political scientist, and academic (died 2015)
- 1926 – Marjorie Tallchief, American ballerina (died 2021)
- 1927 – Pierre Alechinsky, Belgian painter and illustrator
- 1927 – Stephen Keynes, English businessman (died 2017)
- 1928 – Lou Scheimer, American animator, producer, and voice actor, co-founded the Filmation Company (died 2013)
- 1929 – Lewis Wolpert, South African-English biologist, author, and academic (died 2021)
- 1930 – John Evans, Baron Evans of Parkside, English union leader and politician (died 2016)
- 1930 – Mavis Nicholson, Welsh-English journalist (died 2022)
- 1931 – Ed Emberley, American author and illustrator
- 1931 – John le Carré, English intelligence officer and author (died 2020)
- 1931 – Atsushi Miyagi, Japanese tennis player (died 2021)
- 1932 – Robert Reed, American actor (died 1992)
- 1933 – Brian Booth, Australian cricketer and educator (died 2023)
- 1933 – Anthony Skingsley, English air marshal (died 2019)
- 1934 – Yakubu Gowon, Nigerian general and politician, 3rd Head of State of Nigeria
- 1934 – Dave Guard, American folk music singer-songwriter, arranger, and musician (died 1991)
- 1935 – Don Ward, Canadian-American ice hockey player (died 2014)
- 1936 – James Bevel, American civil rights activist and minister (died 2008)
- 1936 – Tony Lo Bianco, American actor (died 2024)
- 1937 – Marilyn Bell, Canadian swimmer
- 1937 – Peter Max, German-American illustrator (died 2026)
- 1937 – Terence Thomas, Baron Thomas of Macclesfield, English banker and politician (died 2018)
- 1938 – Bill Morris, Baron Morris of Handsworth, Jamaican-English union leader and politician
- 1939 – David Clark, Baron Clark of Windermere, Scottish academic and politician, Minister for the Cabinet Office
- 1940 – Larry Chance, American singer-songwriter (died 2023)
- 1940 – Michael Gambon, Irish-British actor (died 2023)
- 1940 – Rosny Smarth, Haitian lawyer and politician, 8th Prime Minister of Haiti (died 2025)
- 1941 – Peter Thornley, English professional wrestler best known for the ring character Kendo Nagasaki
- 1941 – Simon Ward, English actor (died 2012)
- 1942 – Andrew Vachss, American lawyer and author (died 2021)
- 1943 – Robin Holloway, English composer and academic
- 1943 – Takis Ikonomopoulos, Greek footballer and coach (died 2025)
- 1943 – L. E. Modesitt, Jr., American author and poet
- 1944 – George McCrae, American singer
- 1944 – Bill Melchionni, American basketball player
- 1944 – Peter Tosh, Jamaican singer-songwriter and guitarist (died 1987)
- 1945 – Angus Deaton, Scottish-American economist and academic, Nobel Prize laureate
- 1945 – Divine, American drag queen performer, and actor (died 1988)
- 1945 – Patricia Ireland, American lawyer and activist
- 1945 – Gloria Jones, American singer-songwriter
- 1945 – John Lithgow, American actor
- 1945 – Jeannie C. Riley, American singer
- 1945 – Martin Welz, South African journalist
- 1946 – Bob Holland, Australian cricketer and surveyor (died 2017)
- 1946 – Philip Pullman, English author and academic
- 1946 – Keith Reid, English songwriter and lyricist (died 2023)
- 1947 – Giorgio Cavazzano, Italian author and illustrator
- 1948 – James Howard Kunstler, American author and critic
- 1948 – Dave Mallow, American voice actor and screenwriter (died 2025)
- 1948 – Patrick Simmons, American singer-songwriter and guitarist
- 1949 – Lynn Dickey, American football player and radio host
- 1950 – Yeslam bin Ladin, Saudi Arabian-Swiss businessman
- 1951 – Demetrios Christodoulou, Greek mathematician and physicist
- 1951 – Annie Golden, American actress and singer
- 1951 – Kurt Schrader, American veterinarian and politician
- 1952 – Peter Bone, English accountant and politician
- 1952 – Verónica Castro, Mexican actress and singer
- 1953 – Lionel Hollins, American basketball player and coach
- 1954 – Sam Allardyce, English footballer and manager
- 1954 – Deborah Blum, American journalist and author
- 1954 – Joe Bryant, American basketball player and coach (died 2024)
- 1955 – Dan Gutman, American author
- 1955 – LaSalle Ishii, Japanese actor and director
- 1955 – Lonnie Shelton, American basketball player (died 2018)
- 1956 – Steve Doocy, American journalist and author
- 1956 – Elena Garanina, Soviet ice dancer and coach
- 1956 – Grover Norquist, American activist, founded Americans for Tax Reform
- 1956 – Didier Theys, Belgian race car driver and coach
- 1956 – Carlo Urbani, Italian physician (died 2003)
- 1956 – Bruce Weber, American basketball player and coach
- 1957 – Dorinda Clark-Cole, American singer-songwriter and pianist
- 1957 – Ray Richmond, American journalist and critic
- 1957 – Karl Wallinger, Welsh singer-songwriter, keyboard player, and producer (died 2024)
- 1958 – Carolyn Browne, English diplomat, British Ambassador to Kazakhstan
- 1958 – Hiromi Hara, Japanese footballer and manager
- 1958 – Tiriel Mora, Australian actor
- 1958 – Michael Steele, American journalist and politician, 7th Lieutenant Governor of Maryland
- 1958 – Kevin Drum, American journalist and blogger (died 2025)
- 1959 – Nir Barkat, Israeli businessman and politician, Mayor of Jerusalem
- 1959 – Martin Kusch, German philosopher and academic
- 1960 – Dawn Coe-Jones, Canadian golfer (died 2016)
- 1960 – Jennifer Holliday, American actress and singer
- 1960 – Takeshi Koshida, Japanese footballer
- 1960 – Susan Straight, American author and academic
- 1960 – Ayuo Takahashi, Japanese-American singer-songwriter
- 1960 – Dan Woodgate, English musician, songwriter, composer, and record producer
- 1961 – Sunny Deol, Indian actor and producer
- 1961 – Cliff Lyons, Australian rugby league player and coach
- 1962 – Claude Callegari, English YouTube personality (died 2021)
- 1962 – Tracy Chevalier, American-English author
- 1962 – Brian Henninger, American golfer
- 1962 – Bendik Hofseth, Norwegian saxophonist and composer
- 1962 – Evander Holyfield, American boxer and actor
- 1962 – Svetlana Zainetdinova, Soviet-Estonian chess player and coach
- 1963 – Sinitta, American-British singer
- 1964 – Ty Pennington, American model, carpenter and television host
- 1965 – Brad Daugherty, American basketball player and sportscaster
- 1965 – Todd Park Mohr, American rock singer-songwriter and musician
- 1966 – Jon Favreau, American actor, director, and screenwriter
- 1966 – Dimitris Lyacos, Greek poet and playwright
- 1966 – David Vann, American novelist and short story writer
- 1967 – Amy Carter, American illustrator and activist
- 1967 – Yōji Matsuda, Japanese actor
- 1967 – Yoko Shimomura, Japanese pianist and composer
- 1968 – Rodney Carrington, American comedian, actor, and singer
- 1969 – Pedro Castillo, Peruvian politician, President of Peru
- 1969 – Zdeno Cíger, Slovak ice hockey player and coach
- 1969 – John Edward, American psychic and author
- 1969 – Trey Parker, American actor, animator, producer, and screenwriter
- 1969 – Erwin Sánchez, Bolivian footballer and manager
- 1970 – Andrew Griffiths, English politician
- 1970 – Chris Kattan, American actor, producer, and screenwriter
- 1972 – Keith Foulke, American baseball player
- 1972 – Pras, American rapper-songwriter, record producer, and actor
- 1973 – Hicham Arazi, Moroccan tennis player
- 1973 – Okan Buruk, Turkish footballer and manager
- 1973 – Joaquin Gage, Canadian ice hockey player
- 1975 – Burak Güven, Turkish singer-songwriter and bass player
- 1976 – Bruno Dias, Portuguese politician
- 1976 – Omar Gooding, American actor and producer
- 1976 – Jostein Gulbrandsen, Norwegian guitarist and composer
- 1976 – Desmond Harrington, American actor
- 1976 – Paul Hartley, Scottish footballer and manager
- 1976 – Hiroshi Sakai, Japanese footballer
- 1976 – Dan Smith, Canadian ice hockey player
- 1976 – Michael Young, American baseball player
- 1977 – Habib Beye, French-Senegalese footballer
- 1977 – Louis-José Houde, Canadian comedian and actor
- 1977 – Jason Reitman, Canadian-American director, producer, and screenwriter
- 1977 – Raúl Tamudo, Spanish footballer
- 1977 – Mo Twister, Filipino radio and television host
- 1978 – Enrique Bernoldi, Brazilian race car driver
- 1978 – Zakhar Dubensky, Russian footballer
- 1978 – Henri Sorvali, Finnish guitarist and keyboard player
- 1979 – José Luis López, Mexican footballer
- 1979 – Brian Robertson, American trombonist
- 1979 – Sachiko Sugiyama, Japanese volleyball player
- 1980 – José Bautista, Dominican baseball player
- 1980 – Rajai Davis, American baseball player
- 1980 – Benjamin Salisbury, American actor
- 1981 – Leon Bott, Australian rugby league player
- 1981 – Heikki Kovalainen, Finnish race car driver
- 1982 – Atom Araullo, Filipino journalist
- 1982 – J. A. Happ, American baseball player
- 1982 – Gillian Jacobs, American actress and director
- 1982 – Louis Oosthuizen, South African golfer
- 1982 – Gonzalo Pineda, Mexican footballer
- 1982 – Daan van Bunge, Dutch cricketer
- 1983 – Rebecca Ferguson, Swedish actress
- 1983 – Andy Lonergan, English footballer
- 1983 – Cara Santa Maria, American neuroscientist and blogger
- 1984 – Danka Barteková, Slovak skeet shooter
- 1984 – Thundercat, American singer and record producer
- 1987 – Tsunenori Aoki, Japanese actor
- 1987 – Sam Groth, Australian tennis player
- 1988 – Zeph Ellis, English rapper and producer (died 2026)
- 1988 – Markiyan Kamysh, Ukrainian writer
- 1988 – Chris Lawrence, Australian rugby league player
- 1989 – James Gavet, New Zealand rugby league player
- 1989 – Mindaugas Kuzminskas, Lithuanian basketball player
- 1989 – Miroslav Stoch, Slovak footballer
- 1989 – Rakuto Tochihara, Japanese actor
- 1989 – Janine Tugonon, Filipino model and television host
- 1990 – Tom Kilbey, English footballer
- 1990 – Janet Leon, Swedish singer-songwriter and dancer
- 1990 – Ciara Renée, American actress and singer
- 1990 – Endō Shōta, Japanese sumo wrestler
- 1991 – Colton Dixon, American singer-songwriter and pianist
- 1992 – Lil Durk, American rapper
- 1992 – Shiho, Japanese actress and model
- 1993 – Hunter King, American actress
- 1993 – Abby Sunderland, American sailor
- 1994 – Cal Petersen, American ice hockey player
- 1994 – Anthony Santander, Venezuelan baseball player
- 1994 – Agnė Sereikaitė, Lithuanian speed skater
- 1995 – Sammis Reyes, Chilean-American football and basketball player
- 1996 – Chance Perdomo, American-British actor (died 2024)
- 1996 – Bernadeth Pons, Filipino volleyball athlete
- 1998 – Noof Al Maadeed, Qatari women's rights activist
- 1999 – Carlotta Truman, German singer-songwriter
- 2005 – Antonia Nocca, Italian singer-songwriter

== Deaths ==
=== Pre-1600 ===
- 727 – Frithuswith, English saint (born 650)
- 993 – Conrad I, King of Burgundy (born c. 925)
- 1216 – John, King of England (born 1166)
- 1287 – Bohemond VII, Count of Tripoli
- 1354 – Yusuf I, Sultan of Granada (born 1318)
- 1375 – Cansignorio della Scala, Lord of Verona (born 1340)
- 1401 – John Charleton, 4th Baron Cherleton (born 1362)
- 1432 – John de Mowbray, 2nd Duke of Norfolk, English politician, Earl Marshal of England (born 1392)
- 1587 – Francesco I de' Medici, Grand Duke of Tuscany (born 1541)
- 1595 – Philip Howard, 20th Earl of Arundel, English nobleman (born 1537)

=== 1601–1900 ===
- 1608 – Martin Delrio, Flemish theologian and author (born 1551)
- 1609 – Jacobus Arminius, Dutch Reformed theologian (born 1560)
- 1619 – Fujiwara Seika, Japanese philosopher and educator (born 1561)
- 1636 – Marcin Kazanowski, Polish politician (born 1566)
- 1678 – Samuel Dirksz van Hoogstraten, Dutch painter (born 1627)
- 1682 – Thomas Browne, English physician and author (born 1605)
- 1723 – Godfrey Kneller, German-English painter (born 1646)
- 1745 – Jonathan Swift, Irish satirist and essayist (born 1667)
- 1772 – Andrea Belli, Maltese architect and businessman (born 1703)
- 1790 – Lyman Hall, American physician and politician, 16th Governor of Georgia (born 1724)
- 1796 – Michel de Beaupuy, French general (born 1755)
- 1813 – Józef Poniatowski, Polish general (born 1763)
- 1815 – Paolo Mascagni, Italian physician and anatomist (born 1755)
- 1842 – Aleksey Koltsov, Russian poet and author (born 1808)
- 1851 – Marie Thérèse of France (born 1778)
- 1856 – William Sprague III, American businessman and politician, 14th Governor of Rhode Island (born 1799)
- 1889 – Luís I of Portugal (born 1838)
- 1897 – George Pullman, American engineer and businessman, founded the Pullman Company (born 1831)

=== 1901–present ===
- 1901 – Carl Frederik Tietgen, Danish businessman and philanthropist, founded GN Store Nord (born 1829)
- 1905 – Virgil Earp, American marshal (born 1843)
- 1914 – Robert Hugh Benson, English Catholic priest and novelist (born 1871)
- 1914 – Julio Argentino Roca, Argentine army general and statesman, 4th and 9th President of Argentina (born 1843)
- 1916 – Ioannis Frangoudis, Greek general and target shooter (born 1863)
- 1918 – Harold Lockwood, American actor (born 1887)
- 1924 – Louis Zborowski, English race car driver and engineer (born 1895)
- 1926 – Ludvig Karsten, Norwegian painter (born 1876)
- 1936 – Lu Xun, Chinese author and critic (born 1881)
- 1937 – Ernest Rutherford, New Zealand-English physicist and chemist, Nobel Prize laureate (born 1871)
- 1943 – Camille Claudel, French sculptor and illustrator (born 1864)
- 1944 – Dénes Kőnig, Hungarian mathematician (born 1884)
- 1945 – Plutarco Elías Calles, Mexican general and politician, 40th President of Mexico (born 1877)
- 1945 – N. C. Wyeth, American painter and illustrator (born 1882)
- 1950 – Edna St. Vincent Millay, American poet and playwright (born 1892)
- 1952 – Edward S. Curtis, American ethnologist and photographer (born 1868)
- 1956 – Isham Jones, American saxophonist, songwriter, and bandleader (born 1894)
- 1960 – Hjalmar Dahl, Finnish journalist, translator and writer (born 1891)
- 1960 – George Wallace, Australian comedian, actor, and screenwriter (born 1895)
- 1961 – Şemsettin Günaltay, Turkish historian and politician, 9th Prime Minister of Turkey (born 1883)
- 1964 – Sergey Biryuzov, Marshal of the Soviet Union (born 1904)
- 1964 – Nettie Palmer, Australian poet and critic (born 1885)
- 1964 – Christopher Vane, 10th Baron Barnard, English soldier and politician, Lord Lieutenant of Durham (born 1888)
- 1965 – Edward Willis Redfield, American painter and educator (born 1869)
- 1969 – Lacey Hearn, American sprinter (born 1881)
- 1970 – Lázaro Cárdenas, Mexican general and politician, 44th President of Mexico (born 1895)
- 1978 – Gig Young, American actor (born 1913)
- 1983 – Maurice Bishop, Aruban-Grenadian lawyer and politician, 2nd Prime Minister of Grenada (born 1944)
- 1984 – Jerzy Popiełuszko, Polish priest and activist (born 1947)
- 1985 – Alfred Rouleau, Canadian businessman (born 1915)
- 1986 – Dele Giwa, Nigerian journalist, co-founded Newswatch Magazine (born 1947)
- 1986 – Samora Machel, Mozambican commander and politician, 1st President of Mozambique (born 1933)
- 1987 – Jacqueline du Pré, English cellist and educator (born 1945)
- 1987 – Hermann Lang, German race car driver (born 1909)
- 1988 – Son House, American singer and guitarist (born 1902)
- 1992 – Magnus Pyke, English scientist and television host (born 1908)
- 1994 – Martha Raye, American actress and comedian (born 1916)
- 1995 – Don Cherry, American trumpet player (born 1936)
- 1995 – Harilaos Perpessas, Greek pianist and composer (born 1907)
- 1996 – Shamsuddin Qasemi, Bangladeshi Islamic scholar and politician (born 1935)
- 1997 – Glen Buxton, American guitarist and songwriter (born 1947)
- 1997 – Ken Wood, inventor of the Kenwood Chef food mixer (born 1916)
- 1999 – James C. Murray, American soldier, lawyer, and politician (born 1917)
- 1999 – Nathalie Sarraute, Russian-French lawyer and author (born 1900)
- 2002 – Nikolay Rukavishnikov, Russian physicist and astronaut (born 1932)
- 2003 – Road Warrior Hawk, American wrestler (born 1957)
- 2003 – Alija Izetbegović, Bosniak lawyer and politician, 1st President of Bosnia and Herzegovina (born 1925)
- 2003 – Margaret Murie, American environmentalist and author (born 1902)
- 2003 – Nello Pagani, Italian motorcycle racer and race car driver (born 1911)
- 2005 – Ryan Dallas Cook, American trombonist (born 1982)
- 2006 – James Glennon, American cinematographer (born 1942)
- 2006 – Phyllis Kirk, American actress (born 1927)
- 2007 – Winifred Asprey, American mathematician and computer scientist (born 1917)
- 2007 – Randall Forsberg, American activist and author (born 1943)
- 2007 – Michael Maidens, English footballer (born 1987)
- 2007 – Jan Wolkers, Dutch author, sculptor, and painter (born 1925)
- 2008 – Richard Blackwell, American actor, fashion designer, and critic (born 1922)
- 2009 – Howard Unruh, American murderer (born 1921)
- 2009 – Joseph Wiseman, Canadian-American actor (born 1918)
- 2010 – Tom Bosley, American actor (born 1927)
- 2011 – Kakkanadan, Indian author (born 1935)
- 2012 – Lincoln Alexander, Canadian lawyer and politician, 24th Lieutenant Governor of Ontario (born 1922)
- 2012 – Wissam al-Hassan, Lebanese general (born 1965)
- 2012 – Wiyogo Atmodarminto, Indonesian general and politician, 10th Governor of Jakarta (born 1922)
- 2012 – Mike Graham, American wrestler (born 1951)
- 2012 – Fiorenzo Magni, Italian cyclist (born 1920)
- 2013 – John Bergamo, American drummer and composer (born 1940)
- 2013 – Noel Harrison, English singer, actor, and skier (born 1934)
- 2013 – Ronald Shannon Jackson, American drummer and composer (born 1940)
- 2013 – Mikihiko Renjō, Japanese author (born 1948)
- 2013 – Mahmoud Zoufonoun, Iranian-American violinist and composer (born 1920)
- 2014 – John Holt, Jamaican singer-songwriter (born 1947)
- 2014 – Stephen Paulus, American composer (born 1949)
- 2014 – Raphael Ravenscroft, English saxophonist and composer (born 1954)
- 2014 – Serena Shim, Lebanese-American journalist (born 1984)
- 2015 – Bill Daley, American football player and sportscaster (born 1919)
- 2015 – Fleming Mackell, Canadian ice hockey player and singer (born 1929)
- 2015 – Ali Treki, Libyan politician and diplomat, Libyan Minister of Foreign Affairs (born 1938)
- 2016 – Phil Chess, Czech-American record producer, co-founded Chess Records (born 1921)
- 2016 – Giovanni Steffè, Italian rower (born 1928)
- 2017 – Umberto Lenzi, Italian film director (born 1931)
- 2019 – Deborah Orr, Scottish journalist (born 1962)
- 2021 – Jack Angel, American voice actor (born 1930)
- 2023 – Atsushi Sakurai, singer from Japanese rock band Buck-Tick (born 1966)
- 2025 – Daniel Naroditsky, American chess grandmaster (born 1995)

== Holidays and observances ==
- Christian feast day:
  - Aaron (Coptic Orthodox Church of Alexandria)
  - Blessed Agnes of Jesus
  - Aquilinus of Évreux
  - Desiderius (Didier) of Auxerre
  - Frideswide
  - Henry Martyn (Anglican Communion)
  - Isaac Jogues, Jean de Brébeuf, and Companions
  - Blessed Jerzy Popiełuszko
  - Paul of the Cross
  - Ptolemaeus and Lucius
  - Varus
  - Veranus of Cavaillon
  - William Carey (Episcopal Church)
  - October 19 (Eastern Orthodox liturgics)
- Constitution Day, in honor of the country's independence (self-governing in free association with New Zealand) in 1974. (Niue)
- Oxfordshire Day
