= Durbin (surname) =

Durbin /ˈdɜːrbɪn/ is a very rare male first name and a very common surname, according to the 1990 U.S. Census. The surname Durbin is of French origin from a place called D'urban or D'urbin in Languedoc. At the time of the British Census of 1881, its relative frequency was highest in Somerset (36.9 times the British average), followed by Herefordshire, Monmouthshire, Gloucestershire, Brecknockshire, Glamorgan, Cambridgeshire, Wiltshire and Warwickshire.

== Arts and entertainment ==
- Allison Durbin (born 1950), New Zealand-born Australian former pop singer
- Deanna Durbin (1921–2013), Canadian singer and actress
- Frederic S. Durbin, American fantasy/horror novelist
- James Durbin (born 1989), American singer and guitarist, former American Idol]contestant
- John Durbin, American actor
- Karen Durbin (1944–2025), American journalist, feminist, and critic

== Politics ==
- Dick Durbin (born 1944), the Majority Whip for the 113th United States Senate
- Evan Durbin (1906–1948), British economist and politician
- Winfield T. Durbin (1847–1928), Governor of Indiana, USA

== Religion ==
- Elisha John Durbin (1800–1887), American Catholic priest, the "patriarch-priest of Kentucky"
- John Price Durbin (1800–1876), Chaplain of the United States Senate, president of Dickinson College

== Science and academia ==
- Evan Durbin (1906–1948), British economist and politician
- James Durbin (1923–2012), British statistician and econometrician
- Marion Durbin Ellis (1887–1972) American ichthyologist and entomologist
- Richard M. Durbin (born 1960), computational biologist

== Sport ==
- Blaine Durbin (1886–1943), Major League Baseball player
- Caleb Durbin (born 2000), Major League Baseball player
- Chad Durbin (born 1977), Major League Baseball pitcher
- J. D. Durbin (born 1982), baseball pitcher
- Mike Durbin, American ten-pin bowling player
- William Durbin (born 1953), American martial artist, especially of Kiyojute Ryu

== Other fields ==
- Frank Durbin (1895–1999), one of the last surviving American veterans of the First World War
