= Enforced disappearance =

Unlawful secret disappearance

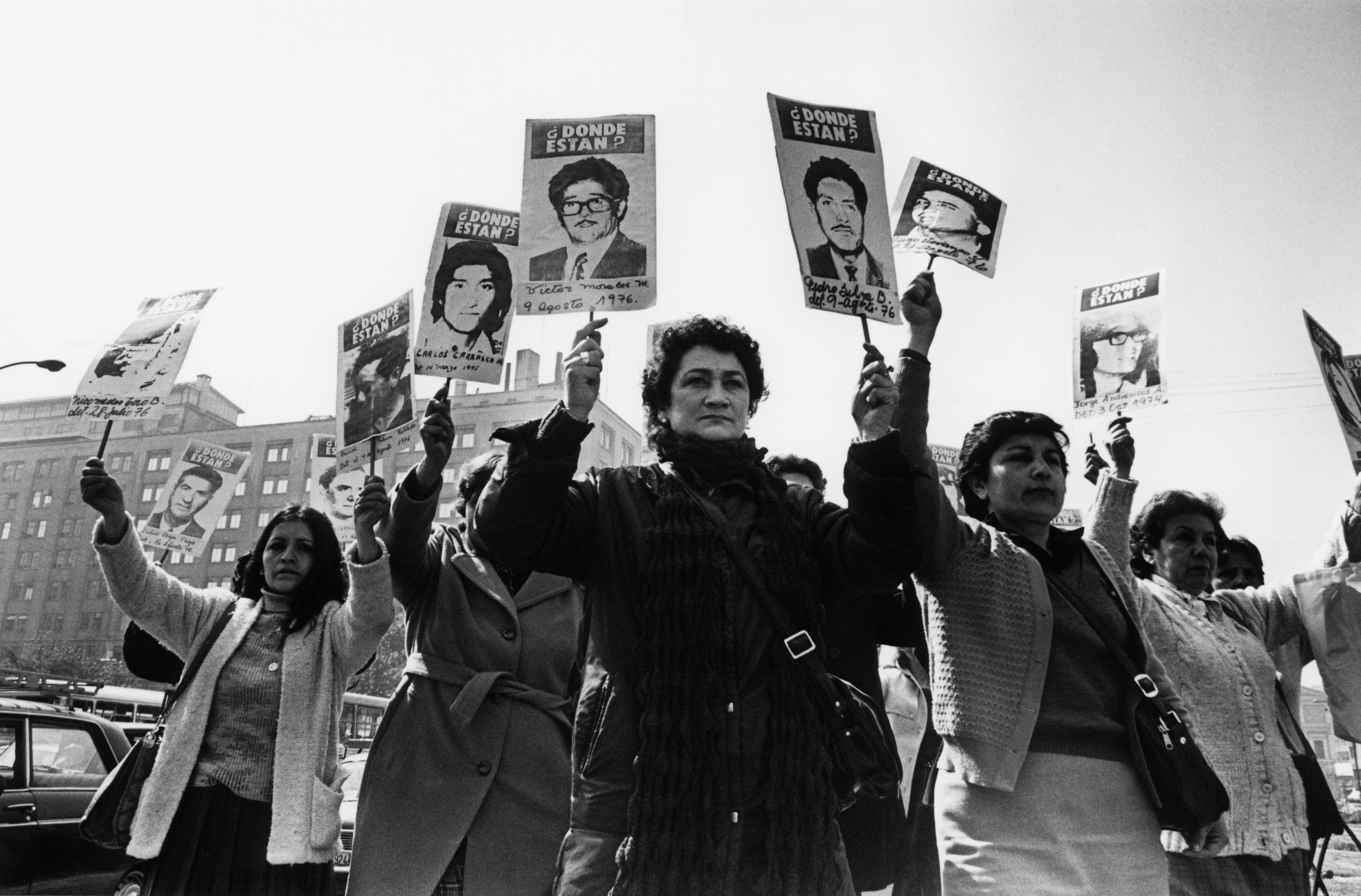
Women of the Association of Families of the Detained-Disappeared demonstrate in front of La Moneda Palace during the Pinochet military regime

An enforced disappearance (or forced disappearance) is the secret abduction or imprisonment of a person with the support or acquiescence of a state, followed by a refusal to acknowledge the person's fate or whereabouts with the intent of placing the victim outside the protection of the law. Often, forced disappearance implies murder, whereby a victim is abducted, may be illegally detained, and is often tortured during interrogation, ultimately killed, and the body disposed of secretly. The party committing the murder has plausible deniability as there is no evidence of the victim's death.

Enforced disappearance was first recognized as a human rights issue in the 1970s as a result of its use by military dictatorships in Latin America during the Dirty War. However, it occurred prior to that time and has occurred all over the world.

According to the Rome Statute of the International Criminal Court, which came into force on 1 July 2002, when committed as part of a widespread or systematic attack directed at any civilian population, enforced disappearance qualifies as a crime against humanity, not subject to a statute of limitations, in international criminal law. On 20 December 2006, the United Nations General Assembly adopted the International Convention for the Protection of All Persons from Enforced Disappearance.

== Human rights law ==
In international human rights law, disappearances at the hands of the state has been labelled as "enforced" or "forced disappearances" since the Vienna Declaration and Program of Action. For example, the practice is specifically addressed by the OAS's Inter-American Convention on Forced Disappearance of Persons. There is also evidence that enforced disappearances occur systematically during armed conflict, such as Nazi Germany's Night and Fog program, which constitutes war crimes.

In February 1980, the United Nations established the Working Group on Enforced or Involuntary Disappearances, "the first United Nations human rights thematic mechanism to be established with a universal mandate." Its main task "is to assist families in determining the fate or whereabouts of their family members who have reportedly disappeared." In August 2014, the working group reported 43,250 unresolved cases of disappearances in 88 different states.

The International Convention for the Protection of All Persons from Enforced Disappearance, adopted by the UN General Assembly on 20 December 2006, states that the widespread or systematic practice of enforced disappearances constitutes a crime against humanity. It gives victims' families the right to seek reparations and to demand the truth about the disappearance of their loved ones. The convention provides the right not to be subjected to enforced disappearance, as well as the right for the relatives of the disappeared person to know the truth and ultimate fate of the disappeared person.

The convention contains several provisions concerning the prevention, investigation, and sanctioning of this crime. It also contains provisions about the rights of victims and their relatives, and the wrongful removal of children born during their captivity. The convention further sets forth the obligation of international cooperation, both in the suppression of the practice and in dealing with humanitarian aspects related to the crime.

The convention establishes a Committee on Enforced Disappearances, which will be charged with important and innovative functions of monitoring and protection at an international level. Currently, an international campaign called the International Coalition against Enforced Disappearances is working towards universal ratification of the convention.

Disappearances work on two levels: not only do they silence opponents and critics who have disappeared, but they also create uncertainty and fear in the wider community, silencing others they think would oppose and criticize. Disappearances entail the violation of many fundamental human rights declared in the United Nations Universal Declaration of Human Rights (UDHR). For the disappeared person, these include the right to liberty, the right to personal security and humane treatment (including freedom from torture), the right to a fair trial, to legal counsel and to equal protection under the law, and the right of presumption of innocence. Their families, who often spend the rest of their lives searching for information on the disappeared, are also victims.

== International criminal law ==
According to the Rome Statute establishing the International Criminal Court, enforced disappearances constitute a crime against humanity when committed as a part of a widespread or systematic attack directed against any civilian population with the knowledge of the attack. The Rome Statute defines enforced disappearances differently than international human rights law:

[T]he arrest, detention or abduction of persons by, or with the authorization, support or acquiescence of, a State or a political organization, followed by a refusal to acknowledge that deprivation of freedom or to give information on the fate or whereabouts of those persons, to remove them from the protection of the law for a prolonged period of time

— (Article 7.2(i))

== History of the legal development and international jurisprudence ==
=== General background ===
The crime of forced disappearance begins with the history of the rights stated in the Declaration of the Rights of Man and of the Citizen, formulated on 26 August 1789, in France by the authorities that emerged from the French Revolution, where it was already stated in Articles 7 and 12:

Art. 7. No person may be charged, detained, or imprisoned except in cases determined by the law and in the manner prescribed therein. Those requesting, facilitating, executing, or executing arbitrary orders must be punished... Art. 12. The guarantee of the rights of man and of the citizen needs a public force. This force is therefore instituted for the benefit of all, and not for the particular utility of those who are in charge of it.

Throughout the nineteenth century, along with the technological advancements applied to wars that led to increased mortality among combatants and damage to civilian populations, movements for humanitarian awareness in Western societies resulted in the founding of the first humanitarian organizations known as the Red Cross in 1859, and the first international typification of abuses and crimes in the form of the 1864 Geneva Convention. In 1946, after the Second World War, the Nuremberg trials brought to public attention to the Nacht und Nebel decree, one of the most prominent antecedents of the crime of enforced disappearance. The trials included the testimony of 20 of those persons considered a threat to the security of Nazi Germany and whom the regime detained and condemned to death in the occupied territories of Europe. However, the executions were not carried out immediately; at one time, the people were deported to Germany and imprisoned at locations such as the Natzweiler-Struthof concentration camp, where they ended up disappearing and no information about their whereabouts and fate was given as per point III of the decree:

III. …In case German or foreign authorities inquire about such prisoners, they are to be told that they were arrested, but that the proceedings do not allow any further information.

German Field Marshal Wilhelm Keitel was condemned in connection with his role in the application of the "NN decree" by Adolf Hitler, although, as it had not been accepted at the time that enforced disappearances were crimes against humanity, the International Criminal Tribunal in Nuremberg found him guilty of war crimes.

Since 1974, the Inter-American Commission on Human Rights and the United Nations Commission on Human Rights have been the first international human rights bodies to react to the phenomenon of disappearances, following complaints made in connection with the Chilean military coup of September 11, 1973. The report of the Working Group to Investigate the Situation of Human Rights in that country, which was submitted to the United Nations Commission on 4 February 1976, illustrated such a case for the first time, when Alfonso Chanfreau, of French origin, was arrested in July 1974 at his home in Santiago de Chile.

Earlier, in February 1975, the United Nations Commission on Human Rights had used the terms "persons unaccounted for" or "persons whose disappearance was not justified," in a resolution that dealt with the disappearances in Cyprus as a result of the armed conflict that resulted in the division of the island, as part of the two General Assembly resolutions adopted in December 1975 with respect to Cyprus and Chile.

=== 1977 and 1979 resolutions ===
In 1977, the General Assembly of the United Nations again discussed disappearances in its resolution 32/118. By then, the Nobel Prize winner Adolfo Pérez Esquivel had made an international appeal that, with the support of the French government, obtained the response of the General Assembly in the form of resolution 33/173 of 20 December 1978, which specifically referred to "missing persons" and requested the Commission on Human Rights to make appropriate recommendations.

On 6 March 1979, the Commission authorized the appointment as experts of Dr. Felix Ermacora and Waleed M. Sadi, who later resigned due to political pressure, to study the question of the fate of disappearances in Chile, issuing a report to the General Assembly on 21 November 1979. Felix Ermacora's report became a reference point on the legal issue of crime by including a series of conclusions and recommendations which were later collected by international organizations and bodies.

Meanwhile, during the same year, the General Assembly of the Organization of American States adopted a resolution on Chile on 31 October, in which it declared that the practice of disappearances was "an affront to the conscience of the hemisphere", after having sent in September a mission of the Inter-American Commission to Argentina, which confirmed the systematic practice of enforced disappearances by successive military juntas. Despite the exhortations of non-governmental organizations and family organizations of the victims, in the same resolution of 31 October 1979, the General Assembly of the OAS issued a statement, after receiving pressure from the Argentine government, in which only the states in which persons had disappeared were urged to refrain from enacting or enforcing laws that might hinder the investigation of such disappearances.

Shortly after the report by Félix Ermacora, the United Nations Commission on Human Rights considered one of the proposals made and decided on 29 February 1980 to set up the Working Group on Enforced or Involuntary Disappearances, the first of the so-called thematic mechanisms of the commission and the most important body of the United Nations that has since been dealing with the problem of disappearances in cases that can be attributed to governments, as well as issuing recommendations to the commission and governments on the improvement of the protection afforded to miss persons and their families and to prevent cases of enforced disappearance. Since then, different causes began to be developed in various international legal bodies, whose sentences served to establish a specific jurisprudence on enforced disappearance.

=== 1983 OAS resolution and first convictions ===
The United Nations Human Rights Committee, established in 1977 in accordance with article 28 of the International Covenant on Civil and Political Rights to monitor compliance by states parties with their obligations, issued in March 1982 and July 1983, two sentences condemning the State of Uruguay for the cases of Eduardo Bleier, a former member of the Communist Party of Uruguay, residing in Hungary and Israel, disappeared after his arrest in 1975 in Montevideo, and Elena Quinteros Almeida, missing since her arrest at the Venezuelan Embassy in Montevideo in June 1976, in an incident that led to the suspension of diplomatic relations between the two countries. In its judgments, the Committee relied on a number of articles of the International Covenant, in particular, those relating to "the right to liberty and personal security", "the right of detainees to be treated humanely and with respect to the inherent dignity of the human being" and "the right of every human being to the recognition of his juridical personality", while in the case of Quinteros, it was solved for the first time in favor of the relatives considered equally victims.

In 1983, the Organization of American States (OAS) declared by its resolution 666 XIII-0/83 that any enforced disappearance should be described as a crime against humanity. A few years later, in 1988 and 1989, the Inter-American Court of Human Rights promulgated the first convictions declaring the State of Honduras guilty of violating its duty to respect and guarantee the rights to life, liberty, and personal integrity of the disappeared Angel Manfredo Velásquez Rodríguez. Rodríguez was a Honduran student kidnapped in September 1981 in Tegucigalpa by heavily armed civilians connected with the Honduran Armed Forces and Saúl Godínez Cruz. Since the express definition of the crime of enforced disappearance had not yet been defined, the Court had to rely on different articles of the American Convention on Human Rights of 1969. Other rulings issued by the Inter-American Court condemned Colombia, Guatemala (for several cases including the call of the "street children"), Peru, and Bolivia.

=== Situation in Europe and resolutions of 1993 and 1995 ===
In Europe, the European Court of Human Rights, established in 1959, in accordance with article 38 of the European Convention for the Protection of Human Rights and Fundamental Freedoms of 1950, became a single permanent and binding court for all the Member States of the Council of Europe. Although the European Convention does not contain any express prohibition of the practice of enforced disappearance, the Court dealt with several cases of disappearance in 1993 in the context of the conflict between the Turkish security forces and members or supporters of the Kurdish Workers Party (PKK) from the Kurdish region to the southeast of Turkey.

Another body providing the basis for the legal definition of the crime of enforced disappearance was the Human Rights Chamber for Bosnia and Herzegovina, a human rights tribunal established under Annex 6 of the Dayton Peace Agreement of 14 December 1995 which, although it was declared incompetent by ratione temporis to deal with the majority of the 20,000 cases reported, it issued a number of sentences against the Serbian Republic of Bosnia and the Republic of Bosnia and Herzegovina, which compensated several families of disappeared persons.

=== Towards the 1992 International Convention ===
In parallel with the resolutions of the international organizations, several non-governmental organizations drafted projects for an international convention. In 1981, the Institute des droits de l'homme du Barreau de Paris (Institute of Human Rights of the Paris Law School) organized a high-level symposium to promote an international convention on disappearances, followed by several draft declarations and conventions proposed by the Argentine League for Human Rights, FEDEFAM at the annual congress of Peru in 1982 or the Colectivo de Abogados José Alvear Restrepo from Bogotá in 1988.

In that same year, the French expert in the then Sub-commission on Prevention of Discrimination and Protection of Minorities, Louis Joinet, prepared the draft text to be adopted in 1992 by the General Assembly with the title Declaration on the Protection of All Persons Against enforced disappearances. The definition presented was based on the one traditionally used by the Working Group on Enforced or Involuntary Disappearances. Although the Declaration included as the primary obligation of States to enact specific criminal legislation, unlike the Convention against Torture, the principle of universal jurisdiction was not established nor was it agreed that the provisions of the Declaration and the recommendations of the Working Group were legally binding so that only a few states took concrete steps to comply with them.

The United Nations Declaration, despite its shortcomings, served to awaken the regional project for the American continent commissioned by the OAS General Assembly in 1987, which, although drafted by the Inter-American Commission on Human Rights in 1988, was subjected to lengthy discussions and modifications that resulted in their stagnation. In June 1994, the OAS General Assembly finally approved the Inter-American Convention on the Forced Disappearance of Persons, which would be the first legally binding instrument on the subject, and entered into force on 28 March 1996, after its ratification by eight countries: Argentina, Panama, Uruguay, Costa Rica, Paraguay, Venezuela, Bolivia and Guatemala.

In view of the meager success of the United Nations Declaration, a non-binding instrument that could only marginally influence the practice of enforced disappearances, a number of non-governmental organizations and several experts proposed strengthening protection against disappearances, adopting a convention within the framework of the United Nations. This was followed by the deliberations of the 1981 Paris Colloquium submitted by Louis Joinet in the form of a draft subcommittee in August 1988. Several governments, international organizations and non-governmental organizations responded to the invitation of Secretary-General Kofi Annan to provide comments and observations to the project.

=== The 2006 International Convention ===
On 20 December 2006, the United Nations General Assembly adopted the text of the International Convention on the Forced Disappearance of Persons after more than 25 years of development and was signed in Paris on 6 February 2007 at a ceremony to which representatives of the 53 first signatory countries attended and in which 20 of them immediately ratified it. On 19 April 2007, the Commission on Human Rights updated the list of countries that ratified the convention, which included 59 nations.

== Report of the United Nations (1980–2009) ==
Since the establishment of the Working Group on Enforced or Involuntary Disappearances of the United Nations Commission on Human Rights (CHR) in 1980, the crime of enforced disappearance has proved to be a global problem, affecting many countries on five continents. It is the subject of a special follow-up by the HRC which regularly publishes reports on its complaint and situation, as well as the response and action of the governments concerned.

The report of the 2009 Working Group recorded a total of 53,232 cases transmitted by the Working Group to Governments since their inception in 1980 and affecting 82 states. The number of cases that are still under study due to lack of clarification, closed or discontinuous cases amounts to 42,600. Since 2004 the Working Group had clarified 1,776 cases. In the previous report of 2007, the number of cases had been 51,531 and affected 79 countries. Many of the countries in the cases are affected internally by violent conflicts, while in other countries the practice of repressive policies towards political opponents is denounced. In other countries, generally in the western and European hemispheres, there are still historical cases that remain unresolved and constitute permanent crimes.

In the official United Nations report of 2009, of the 82 countries where the cases of missing persons were identified, the largest number (more than 1000) transmitted were: Iraq (16,544), Sri Lanka (12,226), Argentina (3,449), Guatemala (3,155), Peru (3,009), Algeria (2,939), El Salvador (2,661) and Colombia (1,235). Other countries with numerous cases under denunciation (between 1000 and 100) are: Chile (907), China (116), Congo (114), Ethiopia (119), Philippines (780), Honduras (207), India (430), Indonesia (165), Iran (532), Lebanon (320), Morocco (268), Mexico (392), Nepal (672), Nicaragua (234), Russian Federation (478), Sudan, Yemen (155) and East Timor (504).

== Examples ==
=== Algeria ===
During the Algerian Civil War, which began in 1992 as militant Islamist guerrillas attacked the military government that had annulled an Islamic Salvation Front victory, thousands of people were forcibly disappeared. Disappearances continued up to the late 1990s, but thereafter dropped off sharply with the decline in violence in 1997. Some of the disappeared were kidnapped or killed by the guerrillas but others are presumed to have been taken by state security forces under Mohamed Mediène. This latter group has become the most controversial. Their exact numbers remain disputed, but the government has acknowledged a figure of just over 6,000 disappeared, now presumed dead. The war claimed a total toll of 150,000–200,000 lives.

In 2005 a controversial amnesty law was approved in a referendum. It granted financial compensation to families of the "disappeared", but also effectively ended the police investigations into the crimes.

=== Argentina ===
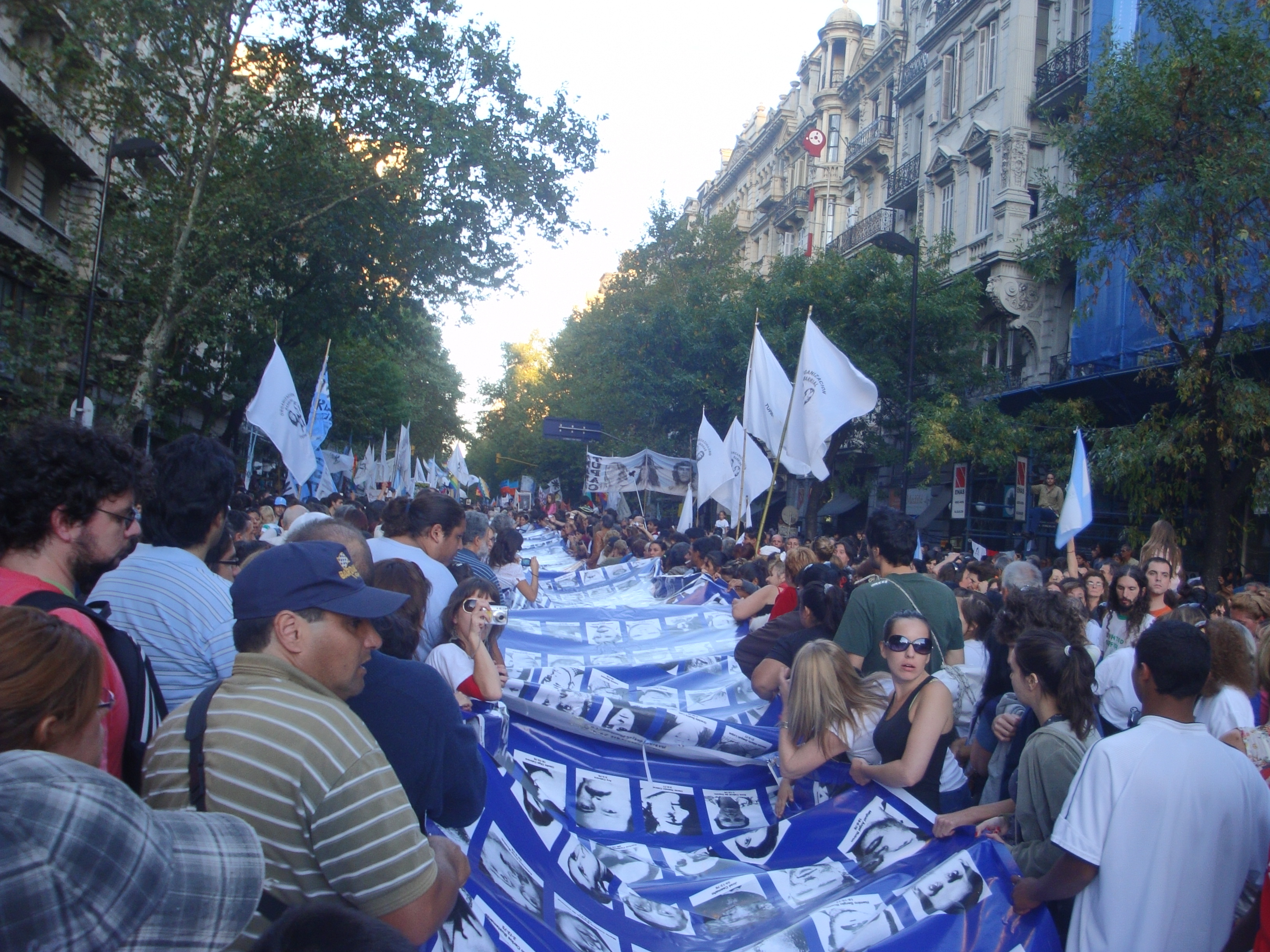
Flag, with images of those who disappeared, during a demonstration in Buenos Aires to commemorate the 35th anniversary of the 1976 coup in Argentina

During Argentina's Dirty War and Operation Condor, many alleged political dissidents were abducted or illegally detained and kept in clandestine detention centers such as Navy Petty-Officers School or "ESMA", where they were questioned, tortured, and almost always killed. There were about 500 clandestine detention camps, including those of Garaje Azopardo and Orletti. These places of torture, located mostly in Buenos Aires, contributed up to 30,000 desaparecidos, or disappeared persons, to the overall count in the Dirty War. The victims would be shipped to places like a garage or basement and tortured for multiple days. Many of the disappeared were people who were considered to be a political or ideological threat to the military junta.

The Argentine military justified torture to obtain intelligence and saw the disappearances as a way to curb political dissidence. Abducted pregnant women were kept captive until they gave birth, then often killed. It is estimated that 500 babies born in this way were given for informal adoption to families with close ties to the military.

Eventually, many of the captives were heavily drugged and loaded onto aircraft, from which they were thrown alive while in flight over the Atlantic Ocean in "death flights" (vuelos de la muerte) to leave no trace of their death. Without any bodies, the government could deny any knowledge of their whereabouts and accusations that they had been killed. The forced disappearances were the military junta's attempt to silence the opposition and break the determination of the guerrillas. Missing people who are presumed to have been murdered in this and other ways are today referred to as "the disappeared" (los desaparecidos).

Activist groups Mothers of the Plaza de Mayo and Grandmothers of the Plaza de Mayo were formed in 1977 by mothers and grandmothers of the "disappeared" victims of the dictatorship to find the children born in captivity during the Dirty War, and later to determine the culprits of crimes against humanity and promote their trial and sentencing. Some 500 children are estimated to have been illegally given for adoption; 120 cases had been confirmed by DNA tests as of 2016.

The term desaparecidos was used by de facto President General Jorge Rafael Videla, who said in a press conference: "They are just that… desaparecidos. They are not alive, neither are they dead. They are just missing". It is thought that between 1976 and 1983 in Argentina, up to 30,000 people (8,960 named cases, according to the official report by the CONADEP) were killed and in many cases disappeared. In an originally classified cable first published by John Dinges in 2004, the Argentine 601st Intelligence Battalion, which started counting victims in 1975, in mid-1978 estimated that 22,000 persons had been killed or "disappeared".

=== Bangladesh ===
At least 500 people – most of whom were opposition leaders and activists – have been declared to have been disappeared in Bangladesh by the state security forces under the Awami League regime of 2009 to 2024. According to the report of a domestic human rights organization, 82 people disappeared from January to September 2014. After the disappearances, at least 39 of the victims were found dead while others remained missing. On 25 June 2010, an opposition leader Chowdhury Alam was arrested by the state police and remained missing since then. His abduction was later denied by the law enforcing agencies. On 17 April 2012, another prominent leader, Ilyas Ali, of the main opposition parties Bangladesh Nationalist Party disappeared by unknown armed personnel. The incident received much media coverage. Before the controversial national election of 2014, at least 19 opposition men were picked up by security forces. The incidents of enforced disappearances were condemned by both domestic and international human rights organizations. Despite the demands for the government initiatives to probe such disappearances, investigations into such cases were absent.

=== Belarus ===
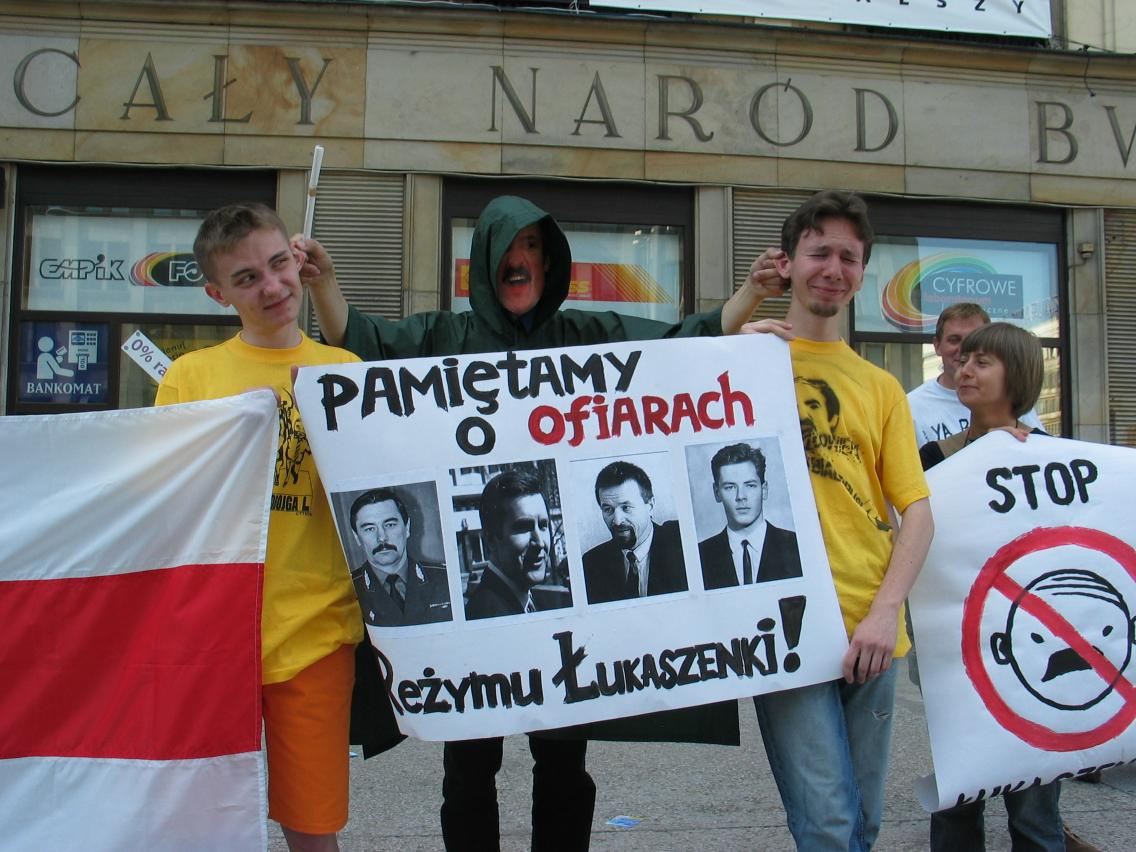
Demonstration in Warsaw, reminding about the disappearances of oppositionals in Belarus

In 1999, opposition leaders Yury Zacharanka and Viktar Hanchar, as well as his business associate Anatol Krasouski, disappeared. Hanchar and Krasouski disappeared the same day of a broadcast on state television in which President Alexander Lukashenko ordered the chiefs of his security services to crack down on "opposition scum". Although the State Security Committee of the Republic of Belarus (KGB) had had them under constant surveillance, the official investigation announced that the case could not be solved. The investigation of the disappearance of journalist Dzmitry Zavadski in 2000 has also yielded no results. Copies of a report by the Parliamentary Assembly of the Council of Europe, which linked senior Belarusian officials to the cases of disappearances, were confiscated.

In December 2019, Deutsche Welle published a documentary film in which Yury Garavski, a former member of a special unit of the Belarusian Ministry of Internal Affairs, confirmed that it was his unit which had arrested, taken away, and murdered Zecharanka and that they later did the same with Viktar Hanchar and Anatol Krassouski.

=== Chile ===
Almost immediately after the Chilean military's seizure of power on 11 September 1973, the military junta led by the then commander-in-chief Augusto Pinochet banned all the leftist parties that had constituted the democratically elected president Salvador Allende's UP coalition. All other parties were placed in "indefinite recess", and later banned outright. The regime's violence was directed not only against dissidents, but also against their families and other civilians.

The Rettig Report concluded 2,279 persons who disappeared during the military dictatorship were killed for political reasons or as a result of political violence, and approximately 31,947 were tortured according to the later Valech Report, while 1,312 were exiled. The latter were chased all over the world by the intelligence agencies. In Latin America, this was done under the auspices of Operation Condor, a combined operation between the intelligence agencies of various South American countries, assisted by a United States Central Intelligence Agency (CIA) communication base in Panama. Pinochet justified these operations as being necessary in order to save the country from communism.

Some political scientists have ascribed the relative bloodiness of the coup to the stability of the existing democratic system, which required extreme action to overturn. Some of the most famous cases of human rights violations occurred during the early period: in October 1973, at least 70 people were killed throughout the country by the Caravan of Death. Charles Horman, a journalist from the United States, "disappeared", as did Víctor Olea Alegría, a member of the Socialist Party, and many others, in 1973. Mathematician Boris Weisfeiler is thought to have disappeared near Colonia Dignidad, a German colony founded by Nazi Christian minister Paul Schäfer in Parral, which was used as a detention center by the DINA, the secret police.

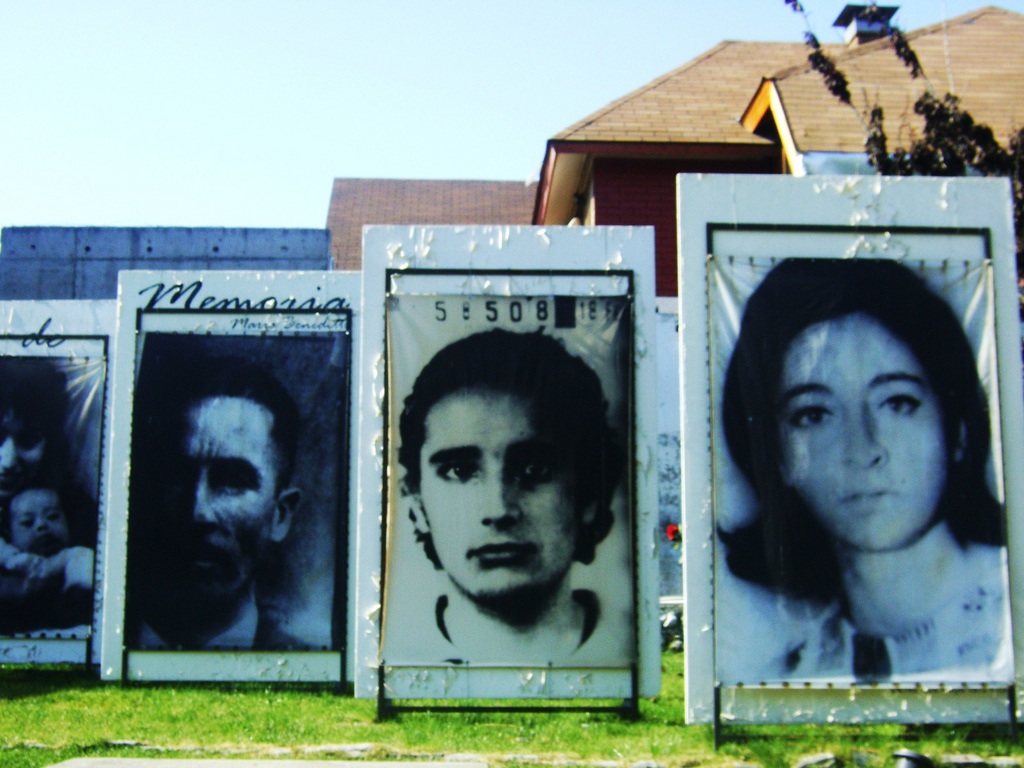
Disappeared people in art at Parque por la Paz at Villa Grimaldi in Santiago de Chile

Furthermore, many other important officials of Allende's government were tracked down by the Dirección de Inteligencia Nacional (DINA) during Operation Condor. Thus, General Carlos Prats, Pinochet's predecessor and army commander under Allende, who had resigned rather than support the moves against Allende's government, was assassinated by a car bomb in Buenos Aires, Argentina, in 1974. A year later, the deaths of 119 opponents abroad were claimed as the product of infighting between Marxist factions, the DINA setting up a disinformation campaign to propagate this thesis, Operation Colombo. The campaign was legitimized and supported by the leading newspaper in Chile, El Mercurio.

Other prominent victims of Operation Condor included, among thousands of less famous persons, Juan José Torres, the former President of Bolivia, assassinated in Buenos Aires on 2 June 1976; Carmelo Soria, a United Nations diplomat working for the CEPAL, assassinated in July 1976; and Orlando Letelier, a former Chilean ambassador to the United States and minister in Allende's cabinet, assassinated after his release from internment and exile in Washington D.C. by a car bomb on 21 September 1976. This led to strained relations with the United States and to the extradition of Michael Townley, a US citizen who worked for the DINA and had organized Letelier's assassination. Other targeted victims, who survived assassination attempts, included Christian-Democrat politician Bernardo Leighton, who barely escaped an assassination attempt in Rome in 1975 by the Italian neo-fascist terrorist Stefano delle Chiaie (the assassination attempt seriously injured Leighton and his wife, Anita Fresno, leaving her permanently disabled); Carlos Altamirano, the leader of the Chilean Socialist Party, targeted for murder in 1975 by Pinochet; Volodia Teitelboim, writer and member of the Communist Party of Chile; Pascal Allende, the nephew of Salvador Allende and president of the MIR, who escaped an assassination attempt in Costa Rica in March 1976; and US Congressman Edward Koch, who received death threats and was the potential assassination target by DINA and Uruguayan intelligence officers for his denunciation of Operation Condor. Furthermore, according to current investigations, Eduardo Frei Montalva, the Christian Democrat President of Chile from 1964 to 1970, may have been poisoned in 1982 by a toxin produced by DINA biochemist Eugenio Berrios. Berríos himself is reputed to having been assassinated by Chilean intelligence in Uruguay, after being spirited away to said country in the early 1990s.

Protests continued, however, during the 1980s, leading to several scandals. In March 1985, the gruesome murder of three Communist Party of Chile (PCC) members led to the resignation of César Mendoza, head of the Chilean gendarmerie the Carabineros de Chile and member of the junta since its formation. During a 1986 protest against Pinochet, 21-year-old American photographer Rodrigo Rojas DeNegri and 18-year-old student Carmen Gloria Quintana were burnt alive, killing Rojas.

In August 1989, Marcelo Barrios Andres, a 21-year-old member of the Manuel Rodríguez Patriotic Front (FPMR, the armed wing of the PCC, created in 1983, which had attempted to assassinate Pinochet on 7 September 1986), was assassinated by a group of military personnel who were supposed to arrest him on orders of Valparaíso's public prosecutor. However, they simply summarily executed him; this case was included in the Rettig Report. Among the killed and disappeared during the military dictatorship were 440 MIR guerrillas.

=== China ===
On 17 May 1995, Gedhun Choekyi Nyima, along with his family, was taken into custody by the Chinese government shortly after being identified as the 11th Panchen Lama by the 14th (and current) Dalai Lama, Tenzin Gyatso. In his place, the Chinese Communist Party (CCP) appointed Gyaincain Norbu to act as the Panchen Lama, though Norbu is not recognized as the Panchen Lama in Tibet or elsewhere (beyond China). Nyima has not been seen in public since he was taken into custody, though the Chinese government claims that he is alive and well, but that he "does not wish to be disturbed". Enforced disappearances of human rights lawyers and defenders have increased under CCP general secretary Xi Jinping's rule since 2013. New laws grant the police unrestricted power to hold detainees secretly for indefinite periods.

Gao Zhisheng, a Chinese Christian human rights attorney and dissident known for defending activists and religious minorities, has been subject to enforced disappearance since August 2017. Previously, in February 2009, Chinese security agents took him into custody, and his whereabouts remained unknown until March 2010, when he resurfaced and confirmed that he had been sentenced and tortured. In April 2010, his family reported him missing again. More than a year and a half later, in December 2011, CCP media Xinhua reported that he had been sentenced to three years in prison. After his release in August 2014, he was placed under house arrest for three more years until 13 August 2017, when he disappeared again. There has been no information from the Chinese government about his whereabouts.

==== Hong Kong ====
Lee Bo (李波) was a dual citizen of Hong Kong and the United Kingdom. On the evening of 30 December 2015, Lee disappeared. His wife shortly received a phone call from him (with caller ID from Shenzhen) in which he explained in Mandarin (not Cantonese in which they would usually converse) he had to assist with some investigation for a while, and he could not be home nor provide more information for a while.

Lee was a co-owner of the Causeway Bay Books and the Might Current publishing house that specialized in selling books concerning the political gossip and other lurid subjects of the Chinese Communist Party leaders. These books were banned from mainland China but were popular among the tourists visiting Hong Kong. Towards the end of October 2015, four co-owners and managers of the bookstore and publisher, Gui Minhai, Lui Bo (呂波), Cheung Jiping (張志平), and Lam Wing-kei, went missing from Thailand and mainland China, believed to be detained by the Central Case Examination Group. Lee had expressed concern for his safety in various interviews after his colleagues disappeared and intentionally left all travel documents at home (confirmed by his wife after his disappearance).

Lee's disappearance drew wide attention. The disappearance of all five men were speculated to be connected to some upcoming news releases that would have embarrassed the Chinese Communist Party. Hong Kong citizens, under one-country two-systems, are supposedly to be protected by the Basic Law in that PRC law enforcement cannot operate in the special administrative region (SAR). Lee's disappearance was considered a threat to Article 27 and most importantly the many rights, freedom, and protection promised to Hong Kong citizens often denied in mainland China.

=== Colombia ===
In 2009, Colombian prosecutors reported that an estimated 28,000 people have disappeared due to paramilitary and guerrilla groups during the nation's ongoing internal conflict. In 2008, the corpses of 300 victims were identified and 600 more during the following year. According to Colombian officials, it will take many years before all the bodies that have been recovered are identified.

=== East Timor ===
During the Indonesian occupation of East Timor, the Indonesian Army commonly utilized enforced disappearances to instill fear in the East Timorese population.

Three notable incidents of mass enforced disappearances were on 8 December 1975 in Colmera, Dili, where 13 Chinese workers disappeared after having been last seen in Indonesian custody digging on the beach, and in December 1979 at Matebian where 48 men disappeared after being falsely accused of being Fretilin members, from April to September 1999 over 15 people disappeared during the Lospalos case.

=== Egypt ===
Enforced disappearance has been employed by the Egyptian authorities under the regime of Abdel Fattah el-Sisi as a key instrument to terrify, interrogate and torture opponents of El-Sisi under the guise of counter-terrorism efforts. Hundreds of people forcibly disappeared including political activists, protesters, women and children. Around three to four people are seized per day by the heavily armed security forces led by NSA officers who usually storm their homes, detain many of them, blindfold and handcuff them for months.

Between 1 August 2016 and mid-August 2017, 378 individuals have been forcibly disappeared. 291 people have been located, while the rest are still forcibly disappeared. Of the 52 children who disappeared in 2017, three were extrajudicially killed.

In 2020, the Egyptian Commission for Rights and Freedoms (ECRF) released a five-year report on forced disappearances, revealing that the country documented 2,723 such cases since August 2015.

In March 2021, Amnesty International condemned Egyptian authorities for the forced disappearance of a husband and wife, Omar Abdelhamid Abu el-Naga and Manar Adel Abu el-Naga, along with their one-year-old child, al-Baraa, after being arrested on 9 March 2019. On 20 February 2021, the wife was questioned about having links to a terrorist group before the Supreme State Security Prosecution (SSSP). She was detained for 15 days pending further investigations at al-Qanater women's prison, while her almost 3-year-old son was handed over to relatives. However, Omar continued to be subjected to enforced disappearance. Amnesty International urged Egypt to conduct an effective investigation into the disappearance of the family, saying, "Seizing a young mother with her one-year-old baby and confining them in a room for 23 months outside the protection of the law and with no contact with the outside world show that Egyptian authorities' ongoing campaign to stamp out dissent and instill fear has reached a new level of brutality".

=== El Salvador ===
According to the United Nations Working Group on Enforced or Involuntary Disappearances, enforced disappearances were systematically carried out in El Salvador both prior to (starting in 1978) and during the Salvadoran Civil War. Salvadoran non-governmental organizations estimate that more than 8,000 disappearances occurred, and in the Report of the Commission on the Truth for El Salvador, it is estimated that more than 5,500 persons may have been the victims of enforced disappearance. The Office of the Procurator for the Protection of Human Rights of El Salvador claims that:

Disappearances usually took place during operations whose purpose was the detention and later the disappearance or execution of persons identified as or suspected of being government opponents, including civilians who had nothing to do with the conflict, with the apparent aim of generating terror and eliminating members of the population who might potentially become guerrillas.

Enforced disappearances of children occurred, which is thought to have been "part of a deliberate strategy within the violence institutionalized by the State during the period of conflict".

=== Equatorial Guinea ===
According to the United Nations Human Rights Council Mission to Equatorial Guinea, agents of the Equatorial Guinean Government have been responsible for abducting refugees from other countries in the region and holding them in secret detention. For example, in January 2010 four men were abducted from Benin by Equatorial Guinean security forces, held in secret detention, subjected to torture, and executed in August 2010 immediately after being convicted by a military court.

=== Germany ===
During World War II, Nazi Germany set up secret police forces, including branches of the Gestapo in occupied countries, to hunt down known or suspected dissidents or partisans. This tactic was given the name Nacht und Nebel (Night and Fog), to describe those who disappeared after being arrested by Nazi forces without any warning. The Nazis applied this policy against political opponents within Germany as well as against the resistance in occupied Europe. Most victims were killed on the spot, or alternatively sent to concentration camps with the full expectation that they would then be killed.

=== Guatemala ===
Guatemala was one of the first countries where people were disappeared as a generalized practice of terror against a civilian population. Forced disappearances was widely practiced by the United States-backed military government of Guatemala during the 36-year Guatemalan Civil War. An estimated 40,000 to 50,000 individuals were disappeared by the Guatemalan military and security forces between 1954 and 1996. The tactic of disappearance first saw widespread use in Guatemala during the mid-1960s, as government repression became widespread when the military adopted harsher counterinsurgency measures. The first documented case of forced disappearance by the government in Guatemala occurred in March 1966, when thirty Guatemalan Party of Labour associates were kidnapped, tortured and killed by the security forces; their bodies were put in sacks and dumped at sea from helicopters. This was one of the first major instances of forced disappearance in Latin American history. When law students at the University of San Carlos used legal measures (such as habeas corpus petitions) to require the government to present the detainees at court, some of the students were "disappeared" in turn.

=== India ===
Ensaaf, a nonprofit organization working to end impunity and achieve justice for mass state crimes in India, with a focus on Punjab, released a report in January 2009, in collaboration with the Benetech Human Rights Data Analysis Group (HRDAG), claiming "verifiable quantitative" findings on mass disappearances and extrajudicial executions in the Indian state of Punjab. It claims that in conflict-afflicted states like Punjab, Indian security forces have perpetrated gross human rights violations with impunity. The report by Ensaaf and HRDAG, "Violent Deaths and Enforced Disappearances During the Counterinsurgency in Punjab, India", presents empirical findings suggesting that the intensification of counterinsurgency operations in Punjab in the 1980s to 1990s was accompanied by a shift in state violence from targeted lethal human rights violations to systematic enforced disappearances and extrajudicial executions, accompanied by mass "illegal cremations". Furthermore, there is key evidence suggesting security forces tortured, executed, and disappeared tens of thousands of people in Punjab from 1984 to 1995.

In 2011, the Jammu and Kashmir State Human Rights Commission (SHRC) recommended the identification of 2,156 people buried in unmarked graves in north Kashmir. The graves were found in dozens of villages on the Indian side of the Line of Control, the border that has divided India and Pakistan since 1972. According to a report published by the commission, many of the bodies were likely to be those of civilians who disappeared more than a decade earlier in a brutal insurgency. "There is every probability that these unidentified dead bodies buried in various unmarked graves at 38 places of North Kashmir may contain the dead bodies of enforced disappearances", the report stated.

=== Indonesia ===
According to historian John Roosa, the first example of forced disappearances being used as a weapon of terror in Asia occurred during the Indonesian mass killings of 1965–66.

=== Iran ===
Following the Iran student riots in 1999, more than 70 students disappeared. In addition to an estimated 1,200–1,400 detained, the "whereabouts and condition" of five students named by Human Rights Watch remain unknown. The United Nations has also reported other disappearances. Many groups, from teacher unions to women's rights activists, have been targeted by forced disappearances. Dissident writers have been the target of disappearances, as have members of religious minorities, such as the Baháʼí Faith following the Iranian Revolution. Examples include Muhammad Movahhed and Ali Murad Davudi.

=== Iraq ===
At least tens of thousands of people disappeared under the regime of Saddam Hussein, many of them during Operation Anfal.

On 15 December 2019, two Iraqi activists and friends – Salman Khairallah Salman and Omar al-Amri – disappeared amidst ongoing protests in Baghdad. The family and friends of the two fear the disappearance of more people following United Nations' warning to security forces and other unnamed militia groups, of carrying out a campaign of kidnapping and 'deliberate killings' in Iraq.

According to the Red Cross, altogether, there have been up to 1 million victims of enforced disappearance in Iraq.

=== Mexico ===
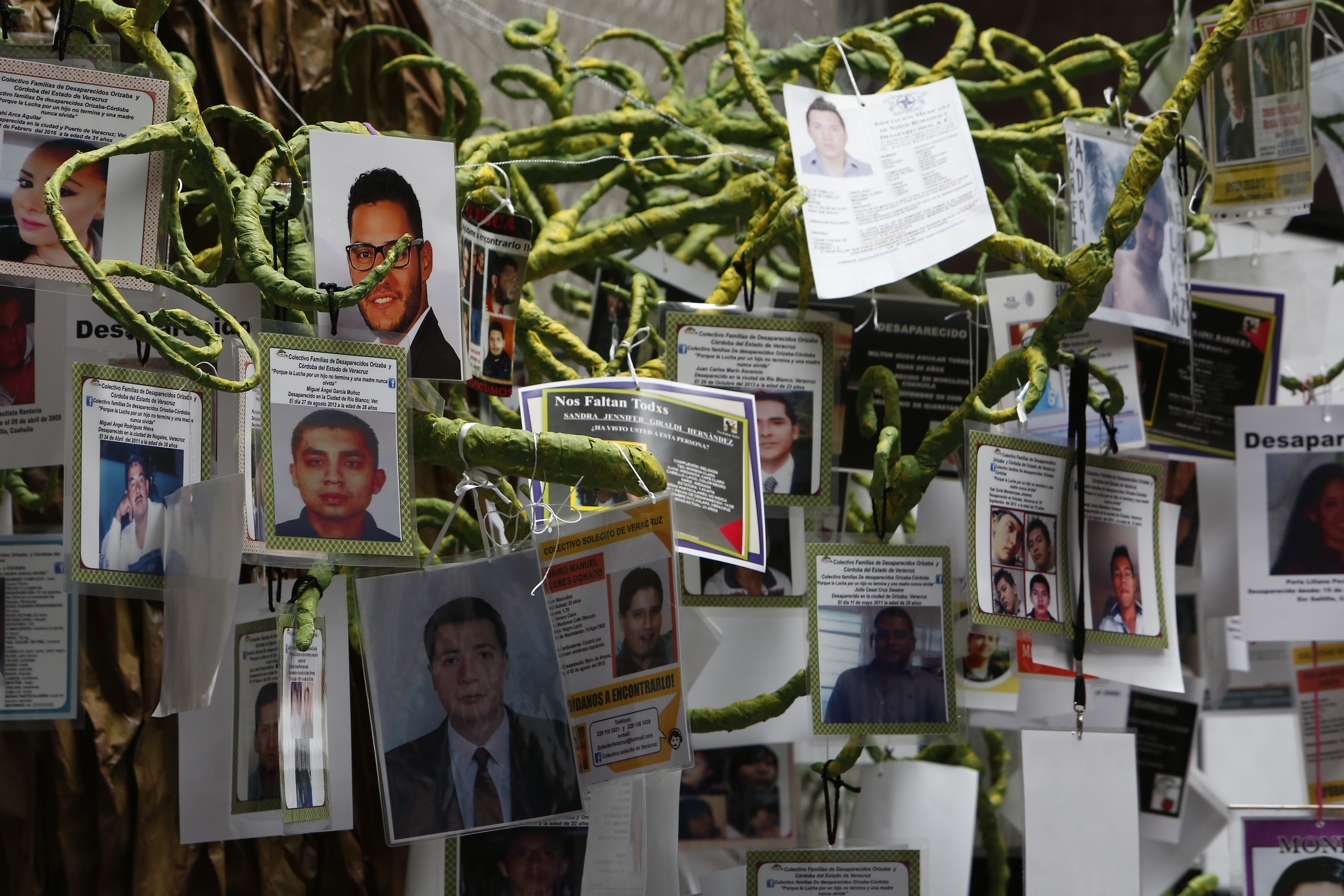
Mexico's disappeared people

During Mexico's Dirty War in the 1970s, thousands of suspected guerrillas, leftists, and human rights defenders disappeared, although the exact number is unclear. During the 1970s, around 470 people were disappeared in the municipality of Atoyac de Álvarez alone.

According to the National Commission of Human Rights (CNDH), between 2006 and 2011, 5,397 people have disappeared. Of these, 3,457 are men, 1,885 are women, but there is no information about the other 55. Usually, the forced disappearances occur in groups and are of people not related to the drug war which was started by President Felipe Calderón in 2006. The main difference from the kidnappings is that usually there is no ransom asked for the disappeared.

Over 73,000 people in Mexico have been reported as disappeared in 2020, according to the Secretaría de Gobernación of Mexico.

=== Morocco / Western Sahara ===
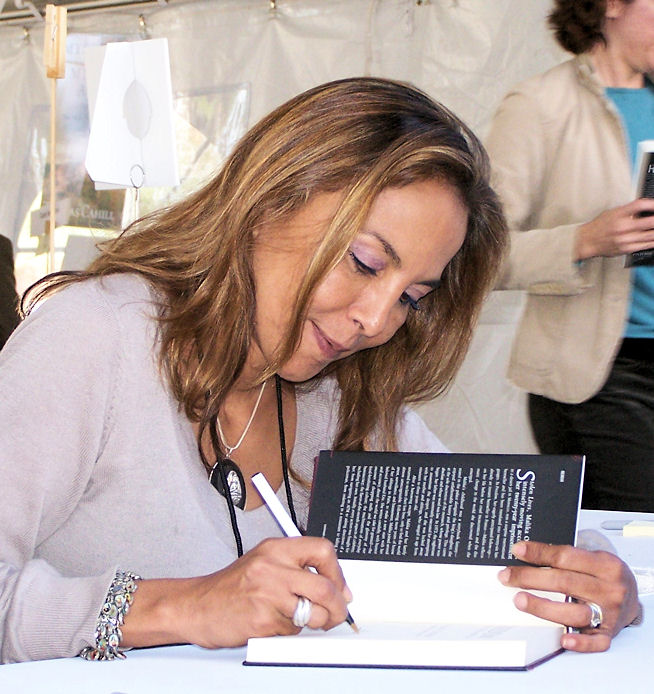
Moroccan writer Malika Oufkir, daughter of General Mohamed Oufkir, is a former "disappeared" in Morocco.

Several Moroccan Army personnel suspected of being implicated in the 1970s coups against King Hassan II were held in secret detention camps such as Tazmamart, where some of them died due to poor conditions or lack of medical treatment. The most famous case of forced disappearance in Morocco is that of political dissident Mehdi Ben Barka, who disappeared in obscure circumstances in France in 1965. In February 2007, Morocco signed an international convention protecting people against forced disappearance. In October 2007, Spanish judge Baltasar Garzón declared the competence of the Spanish jurisdiction in the Spanish-Sahrawi disappearances between 1976 and 1987 in Western Sahara (mostly controlled by Morocco). There have been charges brought against some Moroccan military heads, some of them currently in power as of 2010, such as the head of Morocco's armed forces, General Housni Benslimane, charged for the detention and disappearance campaign of Smara in 1976. Garzón's successor, Judge Pablo Ruz, reopened the case in November 2010.

=== Myanmar ===
During the ongoing Rohingya genocide, Tatmadaw forces have systematically carried out the disappearance and torture of Rohingya people.

Following the 2021 military coup and ongoing opposition movement, thousands of people have been abducted by Myanmar security forces, including politicians, election officials, journalists, activists, and protesters. According to the Assistance Association for Political Prisoners, thousands of people suspected of participation in anti-coup demonstrations have been disappeared through nighttime raids. According to UNICEF, there are over 1,000 cases of children who have been arbitrarily arrested and detained, many without access to lawyers or their families.

=== North Korea ===
In North Korea, forced disappearances of nationals are characterized by detention without contact or explanation to the families of the detained. Foreign citizens, many of whom are ethnic Koreans who were living in South Korea and Japan, have been disappeared after willfully traveling to North Korea or being abducted abroad.

=== Northern Ireland (UK) and Ireland ===
"The Disappeared" is the name given to eighteen people abducted and killed by the Provisional IRA, the Irish National Liberation Army, and other Irish Republican organizations during the Troubles.

The Independent Commission for the Location of Victims' Remains, established in 1999, is the body responsible for locating the disappeared.

In 1999, the Provisional IRA admitted to killing nine of the disappeared and gave information on the location of these bodies; but only three bodies were recovered on that occasion, one of which had already been exhumed and placed in a coffin. The best-known case was that of Jean McConville, a Belfast mother of 10, widowed a few months before she disappeared, who the IRA claimed was an informer. The search for her remains was abandoned in 1999, but her body was discovered in 2003, a mile from where the IRA had indicated, by a family out on a walk. Since then seven more victims have been found—one in 2008, three in 2010, one in 2014, two in 2015 and one in 2017. As of 2017, three have yet to be located.

=== Pakistan ===
The systematic practice of enforced disappearance in Pakistan originated in the era of military dictator General Pervez Musharraf. The extent of forced disappearances increased after the US invasion of Afghanistan in 2001. Enforced disappearances constitute a significant human rights issue in Pakistan. According to a 2021 blog page, the Commission of Inquiry on Enforced Disappearances has stated that it has received complaints of over 7,000 enforced disappearances since 2011, though it has also stated that about 4,800 of these cases have been resolved.

=== Palestine ===
In August 2015, four members of Hamas Armed wing were abducted in Sinai, Egypt. They were abducted by unidentified gunmen according to the Egyptian security officials. The abducted men were in a bus carrying fifty of the Palestinians from Rafah, to Cairo airport.

Hamas confirmed that the four abducted Palestinians were heading to Cairo. The spokesman of the interior ministry Iyad al Bazom said "We urge the Egyptian interior ministry to secure the lives of the kidnapped passengers and free them". Until the moment, no group claimed responsibility for the kidnappings.

In 2025, during the Gaza war, the UN expressed concern of reports that starving Palestinian civilians were being forcibly disappeared at aid sites run by the Gaza Humanitarian Foundation and assisted by the Israeli Defense Forces.

=== Philippines ===
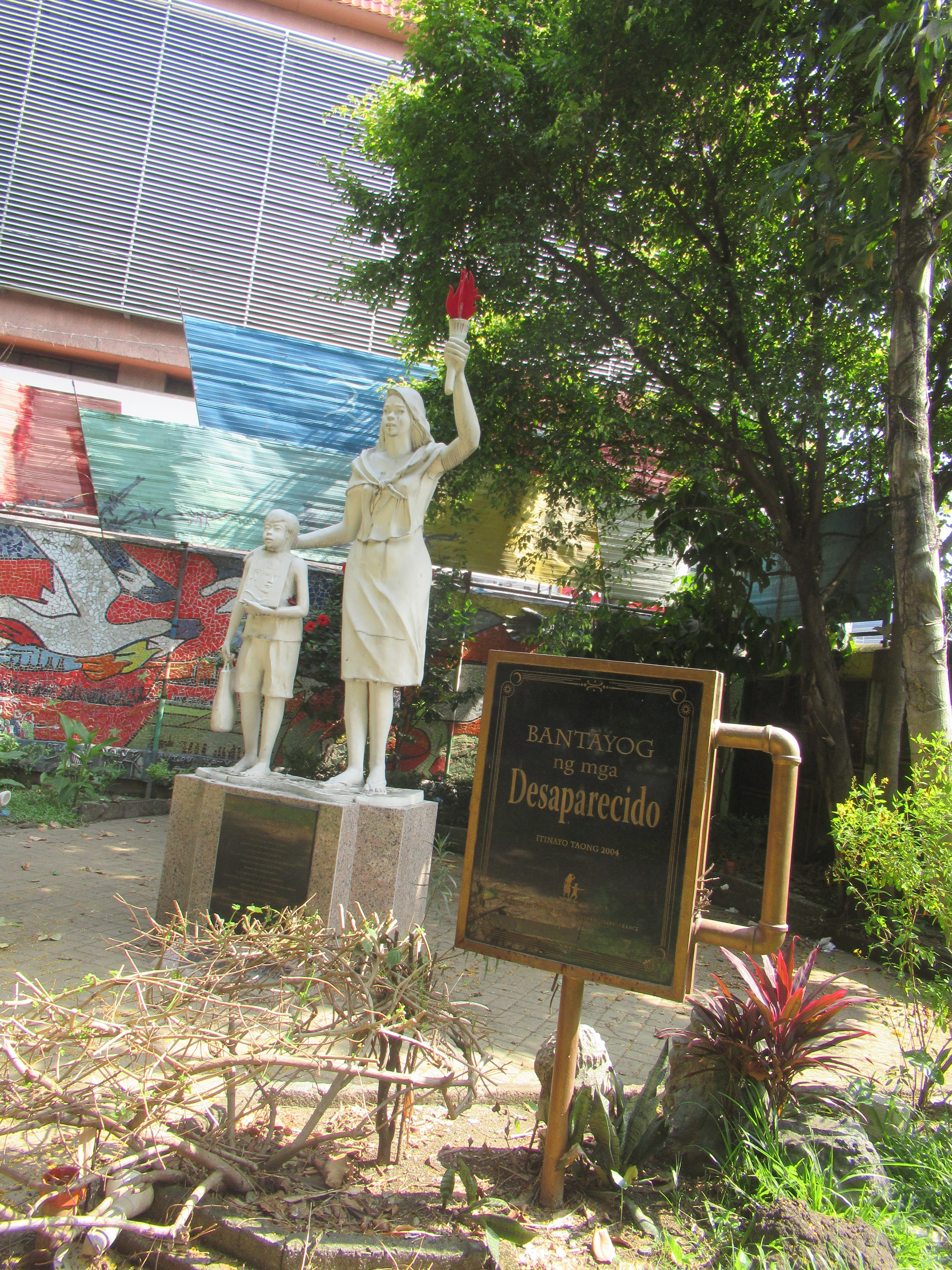
Bantayog Ng Mga Desaparecidos at Baclaran Church

Estimates vary for the number of victims of enforced disappearances in the Philippines. The William S. Richardson School of Law Library at the University of Hawaiʻi places the number of the victims of enforced disappearances under the rule of Ferdinand Marcos at 783. During the Marcos dictatorship, many people who went missing were allegedly tortured, abducted, and killed by policemen.

Charlie del Rosario was an activist and professor at the Polytechnic University of the Philippines, and was last seen on the night of 19 March 1971 while putting up posters for the national congress of the Movement for a Democratic Philippines (MDP), inside the PCC Lepanto compound. The family suspected the Philippine government military in his abduction. Del Rosario, who was never seen nor heard from since, is considered the first victim of enforced disappearance during the Marcos regime.

The Southern Tagalog 10 were a group of activists working in Central Luzon during Marcos's martial law in the Philippines. These 10 university students and professors were abducted and made to disappear during martial law. Three of them were later killed and "surfaced" by suspected agents of the state. The rest remain missing to this day.

=== Qatar ===
Women's rights activist Noof Al Maadeed, who returned to Qatar in 2021 after voluntarily renouncing her asylum claim in the United Kingdom, was last seen on 13 October 2021, weeks after arrival in Doha. Her last communication with the outside world was in March 2023 through 4 social media posts on Twitter, now deleted. Her whereabouts since that time are unknown and the Qatari authorities have not been able to confirm her status, despite pressure from human rights organizations.

=== Romania ===
During the communist regime of Nicolae Ceaușescu, it is claimed that forced disappearances occurred. For example, during the strikes of 1977 and 1987 in Romania, leading persons involved in the strikes are alleged to have been "disappeared".

=== Russia ===
Russian rights groups estimate there have been about 5,000 forced disappearances in Chechnya since 1999. Most of them are believed to be buried in several dozen mass graves.

The Russian government failed to pursue any accountability process for human rights abuses committed during the course of the conflict in Chechnya. Unable to secure justice domestically, hundreds of victims of abuse have filed applications with the European Court of Human Rights (ECHR). In March 2005 the court issued the first rulings on Chechnya, finding the Russian government guilty of violating the right to life and the prohibition of torture with respect to civilians who had died or been forcibly disappeared at the hands of Russia's federal troops.

Since the annexation of Crimea by the Russian Federation, Amnesty International has documented several enforced disappearances of ethnic Crimean Tatars, none of which has been effectively investigated. On 24 May 2014 Ervin Ibragimov, a former member of the Bakhchysarai Town Council and a member of the World Congress of Crimean Tatars went missing. CCTV footage from a camera at a nearby shop captured a group of men stopping Ibragimov, speaking with him briefly before forcing him into their van. According to the Kharkiv Human Rights Protection Group, Russian authorities refused to investigate the disappearance of Ibragimov.

=== South Korea ===
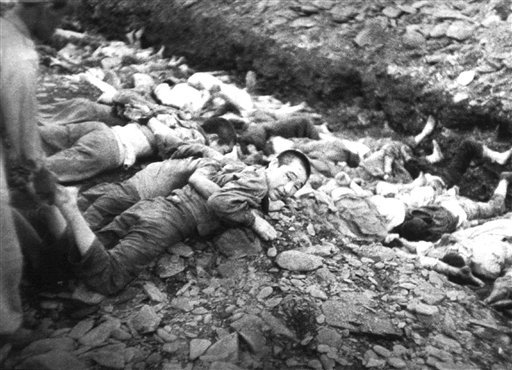
Political prisoners lie on the ground before execution by South Korean troops near Daejeon, South Korea.

Forced disappearances and extrajudicial killings were openly used by the First Republic of Korea during the Jeju uprising, during the Korea War, and as part of the Bodo league massacre during the Korean war. A taboo to speak about these incidents lasted until the end of authoritarian rule in South Korea in 1988.

During the persecution of alleged leftist sympathizers during the war, ordinary civilians under suspicion were rounded up and grouped into four groups A, B, C and D. Groups C and D were shot immediately and buried in unmarked mass graves. A and B were drafted and/or sent on to death marches or held in Bodo League reeducation facilities.

Survivors and family members of extrajudicially killed and disappeared or re-educated persons faced death and forced disappearance if they talked about these incidences during the period of authoritarian rule.

Many of the forced disappearances accidentally discovered mass graves during authoritarian rule were falsely blamed on North Koreans or the People's Liberation Army of China. South Korea is currently involved in shedding light on some of these incidences using the Truth and Reconciliation Commission. Some of the forced disappearance victims include high-profile politicians such as late South Korean President and Nobel Peace Prize laureate Kim Dae-jung, who was forcefully disappeared from his Tokyo hotel room. His attempted murder by throwing him with weights on his legs overboard into the open sea was coordinated by the National Intelligence Service and the Toa-kai yakuza syndicate.

=== Spain ===
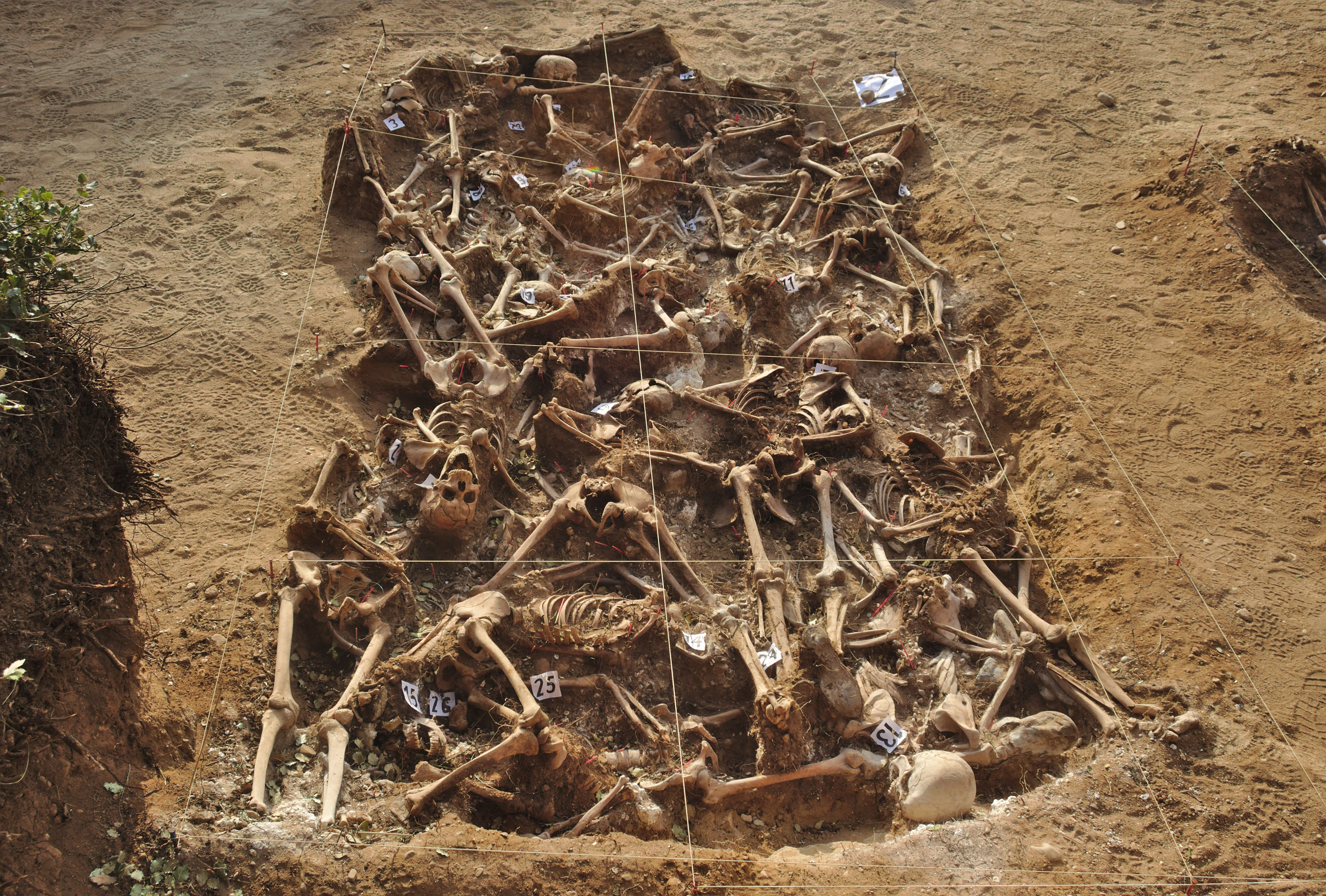
A mass grave of Spanish republicans near Estépar in northern Spain. The excavation took place in July–August 2014.

The United Nations working group for Human Rights reported in 2013 that during the period between the Spanish Civil War (1936–1939) and the end of Francisco Franco's dictatorship (1939–1975), an estimated 114,226 people "disappeared" by being forcibly taken away by either official or unofficial armed groups, where they were secretly murdered and later buried in undisclosed locations. The report also mentions the systematic kidnapping and "stealing" of approximately 30,960 children and newborns, which continued even after the end of the dictatorship during the 1970s and 1980s.

The disappearances include whole Republican military units, such as the 221st Mixed Brigade. The families of the deceased soldiers speculate that the bodies of the disappeared members of this unit may have ended up in unknown mass graves.

It was not until 2008 that the first attempt was made to take the issue to court, with that attempt failing and with the judge in charge of the process, Baltasar Garzón, being himself impeached and subsequently disqualified. The United Nations's Working Group on Enforced or Involuntary Disappearances has openly stated that the Spanish Government is failing to its duties in these matters. As of 2017 the Spanish authorities keep actively hampering the investigation into forced disappearances that took place during and after the civil war.

==== Estimate of the Desaparecidos del franquismo ====
Identification and systematic analysis of the bones of victims in mass graves have not yet, to date, been undertaken by any government of the current Spanish democracy (since 1977).

According to La Nueva España newspaper, the data of people buried in mass graves brought before the Audiencia Nacional court on 16 October 2008 are the following:

- Andalusia: 32,289 (Almería: 373, Cádiz: 1,665, Córdoba: 7,091, Granada: 5,048, Huelva: 3,805, Jaén: 3,253, Málaga: 7,797, Sevilla: 3,257)
- Aragón: 10,178 (Huesca: 2,061, Teruel: 1,338, Zaragoza: 6,779)
- Asturias: 1,246 (Gijón: 1,246)
- Balearic Islands: 1,777 (Mallorca: 1,486, Menorca: 106, Eivissa and Formentera: 185)
- Canary Islands: 262 (Gran Canaria: 200, Tenerife: 62)
- Cantabria: 850
- Castilla-La Mancha: 7,067 (Albacete: 1,026, Ciudad Real: 1,694, Cuenca: 377, Toledo: 3,970)
- Castilla-León: 12,979 (Ávila: 650, Burgos: 4,800, León: 1,250, Palencia: 1,180, Salamanca: 650, Segovia: 370, Soria: 287, Valladolid: 2,555, Zamora: 1,237)
- Catalonia: 2,400
- Valencian Community: 4,345 (Alicante: 742, Castellón: 1,303, Valencia: 2,300)
- Basque Country: 9,459 (Álava: 100, Guipúzcoa: 340, Vizcaya: 369)
  - Basque Government data: 8,650
- Extremadura: 10,266
- Galicia: 4,396
- La Rioja: 2,007
- Madrid: 2,995
- Murcia: 855
- Navarra: 3,431
- Ceuta, Melilla and North African territories: 464
- Other territories: 7,000
- Total: 114,266
  - The final total number was corrected and expanded during the course of the trials, reaching a total of 143,353

=== Sri Lanka ===
Since 1980, 12,000 Sri Lankans have gone missing after being detained by security forces. More than 55,000 people have been killed in the past 27 years. The figures are still lower than the then-current Sri Lankan government's 2009 estimate of 17,000 people missing, which was made after it came to power with a commitment to correct the human rights issues.

In 2003, the International Red Cross (ICRC) restarted investigations into the disappearance of 11,000 people during Sri Lanka's civil war.

On 29 May 2009, the British newspaper The Times acquired confidential United Nations documents that record nearly 7,000 civilian deaths in the no-fire zone up to the end of April. The toll then surged, the paper quoted unidentified United Nations sources as saying, with an average of 1,000 civilians killed each day until 19 May, when the government declared victory over the Tamil Tiger rebels. That means the final death toll is more than 20,000, The Times said. "Higher", a United Nations source told the paper. "Keep going." The United Nations has previously said 7,000 civilians were killed in fighting between January and May. A top Sri Lankan official called the 20,000-figure unfounded. Gordon Weiss, a United Nations spokesman in Sri Lanka, told CNN that a large number of civilians were killed, though he did not confirm the 20,000 figure.

Former US Secretary of State Hillary Clinton has accused Sri Lanka of "causing untold suffering".

=== Syria ===
According to Human Rights Watch, no fewer than 17,000 people disappeared during Hafez al-Assad's 30-year rule.

Bashar al-Assad took his father's policy further and considered any voice questioning anything about Syria's political, economic, social, or otherwise policies should be monitored and when needed, detained and accused of weakening national empathy. A recent case is Tal Mallohi, a 19-year-old blogger summoned for interrogation on 27 December 2009, who was released over four years later.

In November 2015, Amnesty International released a report accusing the Syrian government and its allied militants of kidnapping tens of thousands of people since 2011. The international organization said that such acts represent a crime against humanity. The organization called Syrian government to allow the entry of the United Nations's international committee of inquiry observers in order to access information related to the detainees. Amnesty International has claimed that more than 65,000 people, mostly civilians, have been forcibly disappeared between March 2011 and August 2015. The Syrian government, on the other hand, has repeatedly denied reports accusing it of committing crimes against humanity.

=== Thailand ===
In 2013, the Bangkok Post reported that Police General Vasit Dejkunjorn, founder of the Thai Spring movement, told a seminar that forced disappearance is a tool which corrupt state power uses to eliminate individuals deemed a threat.

According to Amnesty Thailand, at least 59 human-rights defenders have been victims of forced disappearance between 1998 and 2018. Attorney Somchai Neelapaijit, Karen activist Pholachi "Billy" Rakchongcharoen, and activist Den Khamlae are among those who disappeared.

Haji Sulong, a reformist and a separatist disappeared in 1954. He sought for greater recognition of the Jawi community in Patani and Tanong Po-arn. The Thai labour union leader who disappeared following the 1991 Thai coup d'état by National Peace Keeping Council against the elected government.

On 12 March 2004, Somchai Neelapaijit, a well-known Thai Muslim activist lawyer in the kingdom's southern region, was kidnapped by Thai police and has since disappeared. Officially listed as a disappeared person, his presumed widow, Ankhana Neelapaichit, has been seeking justice for her husband since Somchai went missing. On 11 March 2009, Mrs Neelapaichit was part of a special panel at the Foreign Correspondents' Club of Thailand to commemorate her husband's disappearance and to keep attention focused on the case and on human rights abuses in Thailand.

According to the legal assistance group Thai Lawyers for Human Rights, at least 86 Thais left Thailand seeking asylum abroad following the military takeover in May 2014. Among them are the four members of the Thai band Fai Yen, some of whose songs mock the monarchy, a serious offense in Thailand. The band announced on social media that its members feared for their lives after "many trusted people told us that the Thai military will come to kill us." All of those who disappeared in late-2018 and early-2019 were accused by Thai authorities of anti-monarchical activity.

Two Thai activists went missing while living in exile in Vientiane, Laos: Itthipol Sukpaen, who vanished in June 2016; and Wuthipong "Ko Tee" Kochathamakun, who disappeared from his residence in July 2017. Eyewitnesses said Wuthipong was abducted by a group of Thai-speaking men dressed in black.

In December 2018, Surachai Danwattananusorn, a Thai political exile, and two aides went missing from their home in Vientiane, Laos. The two aides were later found murdered. Some in the Thai media see the forced disappearances and murders as a warning to anti-monarchists. As of January 2019, Surachai remains missing. The number of "disappeared" Thai activists exiled in Laos may be as high as five since 2015.

Siam Theerawut, Chucheep Chivasut, and Kritsana Thapthai, three Thai anti-monarchy activists, went missing on 8 May 2019, when they are thought to have been extradited to Thailand from Vietnam after they attempted to enter the country with counterfeit Indonesian passports. The trio are wanted in Thailand for insulting the monarchy and failing to report when summoned by the junta after the 2014 Thai coup d'état. Their disappearance passed the one year mark on 8 May 2020 with still no sign of the trio.

Thai pro-democracy activist Wanchalearn Satsaksit was abducted from Phnom Penh, Cambodia on 4 June 2020, which prompted public concern and became a factor behind the 2020 Thai protests. In June 2020, The Diplomat news reported that several sources, including journalist Andrew MacGregor Marshall, alleged that Wanchalearn's abduction had been ordered by King Vajiralongkorn and overseen by his security chief, Jakrapob Bhuridej and his brother Jiraphop Bhuridej. In 2026, media reports further alleged that Jakrapob had travelled to Thailand shortly before Wanchalearn's disappearance to oversee the operation.

=== Turkey ===
Turkish human rights groups accuse the Turkish security forces of being responsible for the disappearance of more than 1,500 Kurdish minority civilians the 1980s and 1990s, in attempts to root out the PKK. Every week on Saturdays since 1995, Saturday Mothers hold silent vigils and sit-in protests to demand that their lost ones to be found and those responsible be brought to justice. Each year Yakay-Der, the Turkish Human Rights Association (İHD) and the International Committee Against Disappearances (ICAD), organise a series of events in Turkey to mark the "Week of Disappeared People".

In April 2009, state prosecutors in Turkey ordered the excavation of several sites around Turkey believed to hold Kurdish victims of state death squads from the 1980s and 1990s, in response to calls for Turkey's security establishment to come clean about past abuses.

In a study published in June 2017 by Sweden-based Stockholm Center for Freedom, 12 individual cases of enforced disappearances in Turkey since 2016 were documented under the emergency rule. The research titled as "Enforced Disappearances in Turkey" claimed that all cases were connected to clandestine elements within Turkish security forces. Turkish authorities were reluctant to investigate the cases despite pleas from family members.

=== Ukraine ===
During the ongoing Russo-Ukrainian War, there have been many cases of forced disappearances in the territory of the disputed Donetsk People's Republic (DPR). DPR leader Alexander Zakharchenko said that his forces detained up to five "Ukrainian subversives" each day. It was estimated that about 632 people were under illegal detention by separatist forces on 11 December 2014.

On 2 June 2017 freelance journalist Stanislav Aseyev was abducted. The de facto DPR government first denied knowing his whereabouts, but on 16 July, an agent of the DPR's Ministry of State Security confirmed that Aseyev was in their custody and that he is suspected of espionage. Independent media is not allowed to report from DPR-controlled territory.

A UN inquiry found that the Russian child abductions from Ukraine are war crimes and crimes against humanity, consisting of forcible transfer, deportation and enforced disappearance.

=== United States ===
According to Amnesty International (AI), the United States has engaged in forced disappearance of prisoners of war, all captured overseas and never taken to the US, in the course of its war on terror. AI lists at "least 39 detainees, all of whom are still missing, who are believed to have been held in secret sites run by the United States government overseas."

The United States Department of Defense kept the identity of the individuals it held in the US Guantanamo Bay Naval Base ("Gitmo") in Cuba secret, from its opening on 11 January 2002 to 20 April 2006. An official list of the 558 individuals then held in the camp was published on 20 April 2006 in response to a court order from United States District Judge Jed Rakoff. Another list, stated to be of all 759 individuals who had been held in Guantanamo, was published on 20 May 2006.

In 2015, American journalist Spencer Ackerman wrote a series of articles in The Guardian on the Homan Square facility in Chicago, comparing it to a CIA black site. Ackerman asserted that the facility was the "scene of secretive work by special police units," where the "basic constitutional rights" of "poor, black and brown" Chicago city residents were violated. Ackerman asserted that "Chicagoans who end up inside do not appear to have a public, searchable record entered into a database indicating where they are, as happens when someone is booked at a precinct. Lawyers and relatives insist there is no way of finding their whereabouts. Those lawyers who have attempted to gain access to Homan Square are most often turned away, even as their clients remain in custody inside."

According to Human Rights Watch, the March 2025 American deportations of Venezuelans to the maximum-security Terrorism Confinement Center prison in El Salvador were enforced disappearances.

=== Uruguay ===
During Uruguay's civic-military dictatorship, an approximated 197 Uruguayans were illegally detained and forcefully disappeared, and at least one child of a kidnapped person born in captivity was appropriated. As of 2025, the bodies of 31 of these people have been identified by forensic teams.

=== Venezuela ===
A report produced by Foro Penal and Robert F. Kennedy Human Rights documents that 200 cases of forced disappearances in 2018 increased to 524 in 2019, attributed to increased protests. The analysis found that the average disappearance lasted just over five days, suggesting the government sought to avoid the scrutiny that might accompany large-scale and long-term detentions.

=== Former Yugoslavia ===
Thousands of people were subject to forced disappearance during the Yugoslav Wars. Amnesty International gives a figure of 34,700 who were abducted or were forcibly disappeared between 1991 and 2001. Many were later located and found, but by 2012, there were still 14,000 people listed as missing: 10,500 in the Bosnian War; 2,300 in the Croatian War of Independence; and 1,797 in the Kosovo War. Croatian authorities keep intermittently finding the remains of the missing people from the war. In December 2024, seven people were exhumed from two mass graves in the Vukovar area.

== Enforced disappearances within migration ==
The increasingly perilous journeys of migrants and refugees and the ever more rigid migration policies of states and transnational organizations like the European Union cause a particular risk for migrants to become victims of enforced disappearances. This has been recognized by the United Nations's Working Group on Enforced or Involuntary Disappearances. Also the United Nations Committee on Enforced Disappearances recognized the increased risk of enforced disappearances as a result of migration in the Guiding Principles for the Search of Disappeared Persons.

== See also ==
- Lists of people who disappeared
- Arbitrary arrest and detention
- Argentine Dirty War
- Black jails (China)
- Black sites
- Causeway Bay Books disappearances
- Comisión Nacional sobre la Desaparición de Personas
- Command responsibility
- Damnatio memoriae
- Extraordinary rendition
- Ghost detainee
- Gukurahundi
- Inter-American Convention on Forced Disappearance Persons
- International Convention for the Protection of All Persons from Enforced Disappearance
- International Day of the Disappeared
- Missing person
- Mothers of the Plaza de Mayo, an Argentine activist group formed by mothers of desaparecidos
- Nacht und Nebel
- National Defense Authorization Act
- North Korean abductions of Japanese
- Salt Pit
- Saturday Mothers, a Turkish activist group similar to Mothers of the Plaza de Mayo
- Secret police
- Residential Surveillance at a Designated Location
- Vienna Declaration and Programme of Action
