= Durning =

People with the family name Durning include the following:

- Alan Durning (born 1964), American socio-economic commentator
- Bernard Durning (1893–1923), American silent film director and actor
- Charles Durning (1923–2012), American actor
- George Durning (1898–1986)
- Jeanine Durning, Choreographer
- Rich Durning (1892–1948), American baseball pitcher
