= Elisha John Durbin =

American priest (1800–1887)

Elisha Durbin
- Born: Elisha John Durbin; February 1, 1800; Madison County, Kentucky, U.S.
- Died: March 22, 1887 (aged 87); Shelbyville, Kentucky, U.S.
- Occupation: Roman Catholic priest
- Years active: 1822–1885
- Known for: "Patriarch-priest of Kentucky"

Elisha John Durbin (February 1, 1800) – March 22, 1887) was an American Roman Catholic priest, known as the "patriarch-priest of Kentucky".

== Early life and education ==
Durbin was born in Madison County, Kentucky, the son of John Justin Durbin, a pioneer, and Patience Logsdon. In 1816, he was sent to the preparatory seminary of St. Thomas, in Nelson County, where he spent about four years of manual labour and study under missionaries including John Baptist Mary David, Benedict Joseph Flaget, Felix de Andreis, and Joseph Rosati. From there, he went to the nearby Seminary of St. Joseph, at Bardstown, where, in 1821 and 1822, he was taught by Francis Patrick Kenrick.

== Career ==
He was ordained priest in Bardstown, by coadjutor Bishop David on September 21, 1822. Early in 1824, Flaget, Bishop of Bardstown, entrusted to him the pastoral care of western and southwestern Kentucky, about 30 counties, with an area of over 11,000 square miles (28,000 km^{2}), nearly one-third of the state. Thus began a missionary career of over 60 years as the "Apostle of Western Kentucky". Union County, Kentucky was the center of his mission. From it he journeyed on horseback over his vast territory, erected churches, established stations, formed congregations, and visited isolated families.

In the beginning, duty called him beyond his mission proper into Indiana, and once a year to Nashville, Tennessee. He traversed a sparsely settled mission incessantly. Occasionally, a cogent communication from him would appear in the press.

In 1884, he was assigned him the small mission at Princeton, Kentucky. Durbin suffered a stroke in 1885, which resulted in paralysis. He died in Shelbyville, Kentucky in 1887.
