= William Durbin =

- Born: William Paul Durbin Jr. December 31, 1953; Bardstown, Kentucky, United States
- Style: Judo • Kodenkan Jujitsu • Goju-ryu • Shorin-ryu • Juko-ryu • Kosho Ryu Kenpo
- Teachers: Richard Stone, Rod Sacharnoski, Bill "Superfoot" Wallace
- Rank: Shodai Soke of Kiyojute Ryu Kempo Bugei

William Paul Durbin Jr. (born Dec. 31, 1953) is a martial artist and Baptist minister, known for founding Kiyojute Ryu Kempo Bugei (気楊柔手流拳法武芸, Kiyōjūte-ryū Kenpō Bugei), meaning "spiritually positive gentle person system of martial arts", a form of Kempo, in 1982. It is a Gendai Budō martial art in the James Mitose lineage intended to provide for all aspects of self-defense. The Hombu Dojo, or headquarters, is located in Frankfort, Kentucky.

== Life ==
Durbin was born in Minneapolis, Minnesota. His father Richard P Durbin Sr. was a veteran of World War II and his mother Harvie Brown Haynes was bedridden for most of Durbin's childhood due to health issues. Durbin has stated that he decided to dedicate his life to the ministry at the age of fourteen during a baptist revival. After several incidents he began his martial arts studies in Bardstown, Kentucky with instructor Richard Stone, originally learning Kodokan Judo, at the age of sixteen. When he left for college in 1971, he along with Bob Sester (a Shotokan Karate student), and Bos Bosmar (also with the Kodokan) started Campbellsville College Martial Arts Club at Campbellsville University. During his time with the college, Durbin has stated that he studied various other forms of martial arts (while being unable to cite any third party sources) including; Shotokan Karate, Isshin-ryu, Goju Ryu, Shorin-ryu, Aikikai Aikido, Ninjutsu, Tae Kwon Do, Hapkido, and tai chi.

According to Durbin, in 1974, while teaching self-defense in Michigan he coined the phrase "Ki Yang Ju Te", to reflect his personal teaching philosophy toward the martial arts. Durbin graduated in 1975 from Campbellsville College. In 1978, he (along with Richard Stone) joined with Rod Sacharnoski of Juko Kai and began to study with Bill "Superfoot" Wallace, a master of Shorin-ryu Karate and the World Middleweight Full Contact Karate Champion. After joining Juko Kai, Durbin has stated that he demonstrated his martial art skill to Rod Sacharnoski and was granted rank in Juko Kai and started teaching Juko Kai using his personal philosophy.

In 1980, Durbin was awarded his Shihan ranking from Juko Kai in Kempo. Also in 1980 he experienced what he describes as a Tenshin Sho, a "divine illumination" where his perspective on religion and his practice of martial arts changed. Instead of being a minister who practiced martial arts, he now considered himself a "martial arts minister". He was encouraged by Sacharnoski to pursue this further and began to develop a curriculum and codify his philosophies and teachings in preparations for opening his own school and founding his own system. He opened his dojo in Frankfort the next year in 1981 under the auspices of Juko Kai.

Durbin has Shihan rank in Kempo, Karate, jujutsu, Aikijujutsu, Kobujutsu and a Sibak rank in tai chi through Juko Kai by Rod Sacharnoski, and a Shihan rank in Koga ha Kosho Shorei Ryu Ninjutsu under Nimr Hassan. He also has earned a 1st Dan rank in the Budo Taijutsu of the Bujinkan under John Willson, and a 1st Dan rank in Taekwondo. He also holds a 3rd Dan rank in Kodokan Judo.

In 2001, Durbin published Mastering Kempo, a general textbook of Kempo history, philosophy and technique. Also in 2001 he co-wrote Judo Techniques and Tactics with Jimmy Pedro. In 2004 he wrote Koga Ryu Ninjutsu, a book on the history and basic techniques of ninjutsu, and in 2007 he wrote Renzoku Ken: Combat Combinations of Kempo. Since 1989 he has also written several dozen articles for various martial arts magazines, including ten articles published in Black Belt Magazine.

== Creation of Kiyojute Ryu ==
Kiyojute Ryu Kempo Bugei
- Also known as: Kiyojute Ryu
- Date founded: c.1982
- Founder: William Durbin (born 1953)
- Current head: William Durbin
- Arts taught: Shogei Toitsu Kempo • Goho Kempo Karate • Juho Kempo Jujitsu • Aikiho Kempo Aikijujutsu • Bukiho Kempo Kobujutsu • Nimpo Kempo Kobjutsu • Shuho Kempo Karatejutsu • Zongshi tai chi
- Ancestor schools: Juko-ryu • Goju-ryu • Shorin-ryu • Mobutu-ryu • Judo • Koga ha Kosho Shorei Ryu
- Official website: www.kiyojuteryu.org

Between 1980 and 1982 Durbin researched the history and techniques of martial arts in preparation for founding of a school, drawing on elements of each of the arts he studied, especially those arts he held Shihan ranking in. During this time, he was awarded an unaccredited Masters and Doctorate degree by Juko Kai through their diploma mill, the University of Oriental Philosophy in Murphy, North Carolina.

In 1986, Kiyojute Ryu opened its first dojo in Frankfort, as Durbin's own dojo switched from officially being a Juko Kai dojo to being a Kiyojute Ryu dojo. Durbin's aim was to create an art that reflects his Baptist and moral values, and places an emphasis on self-defense, compassion for ones fellow man, and responsible use of force rather than on aggression, destruction, or hurting others. Durbin point to historical martial arts masters such as Morihei Ueshiba combined spiritual training along with physical training, and that many masters were also clergy. Durbin was inspired in what he describes as a Tenshin Sho or where he received a divine inspiration to teach the martial arts. His teachings and techniques were devised in an attempt to pass along this inspiration and as he describes it "how to love and live at peace". He describes this in his writings as "seeing the light".

Kiyojute Ryu Kempo is built on the philosophy developed by Durbin in the 1970s. He coined the term "Kiyojute" to describe this philosophy of martial arts. The stated goal of Kiyojute Ryu is to train person through martial arts to have a closer relationship with God, a positive and healthy outlook on life, and to be gentle and compassionate in their actions with their fellow man, hence "spiritually positive gentle hand/person".

=== Recognition and endorsements ===
Durbin has written that he considers it very important that his students understand that he is not a "self proclaimed" Soke and that he is acknowledged by other members of the martial arts community as a legitimate headmaster of a Kempo system. To this end he has sought recognition from other prominent martial artists, especially those in the training lineage of James Mitose.

The back cover of his book Mastering Kempo includes quotes of endorsement from Bill Beach and Bill "Superfoot" Wallace as to the martial arts skill of Durbin. There, Bill Wallace is quoted describing him as "one of the leading practitioners of Kempo" and Bill Beach describes him as "I have studied his methods and worked and practiced with him for five years. His skills and abilities in the martial arts, especially Kempo, are fascinating."

=== Expansion ===
The first dedicated Kiyojute Ryu dojo was opened in 1986, and as early as 1988 additional dojo began to open with Brad Gardone going on to open a dojo of Kiyojute Ryu at the University of Louisville and later a separate dojo in Louisville away from the university. In the 1990s several more dojo would open, including Lexington, Kentucky, the University of Kentucky , Urbana, Illinois, Chicago, Illinois and Cleveland, Ohio.

=== Training ===
The instruction is in a family atmosphere, where students train as partners instead of adversaries. Training is relatively informal, with little ritual aside from formalized bowing to begin and end class and a formal ceremony involved with belt tests and promotions. This is done with the intention of recreating some elements of pre-Meiji era martial arts schools. Part of the family atmosphere is the practice that its dojo are not widely distributed but spread through Kentucky, Ohio, Illinois and Tennessee. Part of the atmosphere family and mutual respect of Kiyojute Ryu includes the members of the class hugging each other after class. Kiyojute Ryu Kempo has no "tournament" or "sport" aspects, and training for competitions is never conducted.

== Religion ==
Durbin teaches Kempo from a Christian perspective and refers to his own dojo as the "Christian Martial Arts Association", which is also the name of the non-profit organization that Kiyojute Ryu is legally incorporated as. While he personally teaches from a Christian perspective, he states he is open to teaching students of any religion, quoting the style web site FAQ he explains how religion is handled:

Like most martial arts masters, at least in the classical sense, I am a very religious person. Actually I am an ordained Baptist minister. But this is no different than Morihei Ueshiba being a Shinto priest and Michiomi Nakano (So Doshin) being a Zen Buddhist priest.

However, like those masters, I teach Kiyojute Ryu Kempo openly to people of all walks of life. The only requirement I have is that a person should have a fundamental belief in God in some form. A person who just does not believe in God cannot possibly reach the highest levels of the martial arts, since they are of a spiritual nature.

In Japan the martial arts have been called Shin Ken, meaning divine fist. In Okinawa they were known as Kami Te, divine hand. In both cases the belief is that the martial arts are inspired by God. I believe this with all my heart. But I know that God loves all people in all countries, so that he has reached out in many ways to touch the lives of His children. Thus as long as a person has some concept of God, they can reach the highest levels in Kiyojute Ryu with no problem.

If you ask me my personal experience with God, you will learn about Jesus Christ, for this is how God touched me, through His son Jesus. However, we have students in Kiyojute Ryu who are of all Christian faiths, Buddhists, Hindu, Sikhs, Baháʼí, and even Wicca.

The only people who have ever had any trouble with the philosophy of Kiyojute Ryu have been people who do not believe in God at all. But in all my years, this has only been two people. So as long as a person believes in God, regardless of any other aspect of personal belief, they can easily learn and train in Kiyojute Ryu.

—

However Durbin also states, " A person who just does not believe in God cannot possibly reach the highest levels of the martial arts, since they are of a spiritual nature.".

The belief that Christianity is not unlike other religions such as Buddhism for purposes of the spiritual growth required for advanced-level practitioners of martial arts is not a belief unique to Kiyojute Ryu, Masaaki Hatsumi of Bujinkan has written that the spiritual goals with regards of the martial arts of Christianity and Buddhism are the same.

== Publications ==
- Durbin, William (2001). Mastering Kempo. Champaign, IL: Human Kinetics. ISBN 0-7360-0350-9.
- Pedro, Jimmy & Durbin, William (2001). Judo Techniques and Tactics. Champaign, IL: Human Kinetics. ISBN 0-7360-0343-6.
- Durbin, William (2004). Koga-ryu Ninjutsu. Boulder, CO: Paladin Press. ISBN 1-58160-459-9.
- Durbin, William (2007). Kiyojute Ryu Kempo Handbook. self-published: Lulu Content 617266.
- Durbin, William (2007). Renzoku Ken: Combat Combinations of Kempo. Burbank, CA: Unique Publications. ISBN 978-0865682641.
