= Noof Al Maadeed =

Qatari women's rights activist (born 1998)

- نوف المعاضيد
- Born: 19 October 1998 (age 28); Qatar
- Occupation: Activist
- Years active: 2019–2023

Noof Al Maadeed (Arabic: نوف المعاضيد; born 19 October 1998) is a Qatari women's rights activist. She gained international attention in 2019 after documenting her escape from Qatar on TikTok after allegedly experiencing years of domestic violence and restricted women's rights. She lived in the United Kingdom until 2021 as an asylum seeker. On 30 September that year, she returned to Qatar after reassurances from the government that she would be safe and that her rights would be respected.

In March 2023, she posted videos detailing limitations and abuse she has faced, including travel bans and blackmail. The Gulf Centre for Human Rights has said that she "has not been heard from publicly since", but that in mid-2024 it heard that she is "alive but banned from talking to the media or expressing her views on social media networks".

== Early life ==
Maadeed was born on 19 October 1998.

== Escape to United Kingdom ==
Maadeed fled to the United Kingdom from Qatar in 2019, following years of alleged domestic abuse from her family and restricted women's rights in the country. She sought political asylum, citing domestic violence inflicted by her family, particularly her father, and the Qatari authorities' failure to protect her.

Qatar's law has restrictions on women under 25 flying abroad without a male guardian, and women must have permission from their male guardians to receive government jobs, scholarships for higher education, and certain kinds of healthcare. In order to receive an exit permit to leave the country, Maadeed stole her father's phone and requested it herself via Metrash, a government application. On 26 November 2019, she left her house through her bedroom window and went to the airport, first flying to Ukraine, then arriving in the UK.

A TikTok video she made documenting her journey went viral. Following her arrival in the UK, Maadeed became a prominent Qatari women's rights activist, spreading awareness of gender discrimination in Qatar. She also gave several television interviews. Maadeed used social media to give advice on immigration and asylum.

== Return to Qatar and disappearance ==
In October 2021, Al Maadeed voluntarily returned to Qatar from the United Kingdom after reassurance from Qatari authorities that she would be safe in the country. She stayed in a hotel, and had security presence. She reported receiving threats to her life and sought help from the local authorities, then publicly voiced her concerns about the lack of help she received. In an Instagram video posted on 12 October, she said her family had made attempts to kill her.

Her daily postings on Twitter and Instagram ceased on 13 October, prompting concern online, as Maadeed has previously warned her followers that silence on social media meant her safety was at risk. In tweets earlier that month, she claimed her father had visited the hotel, and that her life was in imminent danger. In a response to The Guardian, a Qatari official claimed she was "safe and in good health". The Gulf Centre for Human Rights claimed they had received tips that Maadeed had been given to her family's custody on 13 October.

The Times stated that a relative of Maadeed's stated she was committed to a psychiatric hospital against her will by her family. The relative also claimed she was heavily medicated and guarded at all times, though a Qatari official stated she was safe and in good health. Human rights groups reported that Maadeed was feared to have been killed or forced to disappear following her return.

In January 2022, Maadeed returned to Twitter on a new account and posted a video confirming that she was alive. She said she had lost the password for her previous account, which had 16,000 followers at the time. She said she was living in Doha and was safe. In March 2023, Maadeed posted several videos on her social media accounts, including Twitter, with the caption "The stupid one who returned to her homeland". The videos allegedly showed human and civil rights violations in Qatar, and Maadeed was visibly in emotional distress. She claimed to be under a travel ban. The Gulf Centre for Human Rights has said that she "has not been heard from publicly since", but that in mid-2024 it heard that she is "alive but banned from talking to the media or expressing her views on social media networks".

== See also ==
- Loujain al-Hathloul
- Samar Badawi
