= Alan Durning =

American activist

- Born: November 7, 1964 (age 61); Seattle, Washington, U.S.
- Education: Oberlin College
- Occupation: Environmentalist

Alan Durning (born November 7, 1964, as Alan Bresler Durning, then Alan Thein Durning from 1991 to 2008) is the founder and executive director of the Sightline Institute (formerly Northwest Environment Watch), a nonprofit organization based in Seattle, Washington, U.S.

Durning grew up in Seattle, spent his high school years in Chevy Chase, Maryland, and attended Oberlin College during the mid-1980s. From 1986 to 1993, Durning worked as a researcher at the Worldwatch Institute in Washington, D.C. In 1993, Durning returned to Seattle and founded Northwest Environment Watch.

Durning is the author or coauthor of dozens of books and articles. His published books include, among others:

- How Much Is Enough?: The Consumer Society and the Future of the Earth
- This Place on Earth: Home and the Practice of Permanence
- The Car and the City
- Misplaced Blame: The Real Roots of Population Growth
- Stuff: The Secret Lives of Everyday Things
- Tax Shift
- Green Collar Jobs: Working in the New Northwest
- Unlocking Home: Three Keys to Affordable Communities

Durning's newspaper and magazine articles have appeared in more than 100 periodicals, including The New York Times, Los Angeles Times, Washington Post, Foreign Policy, and Slate. Durning has been a commentator on National Public Radio and has lectured at universities, conferences, and at the White House.
