= Tal al-Mallohi =

Syrian blogger from Homs

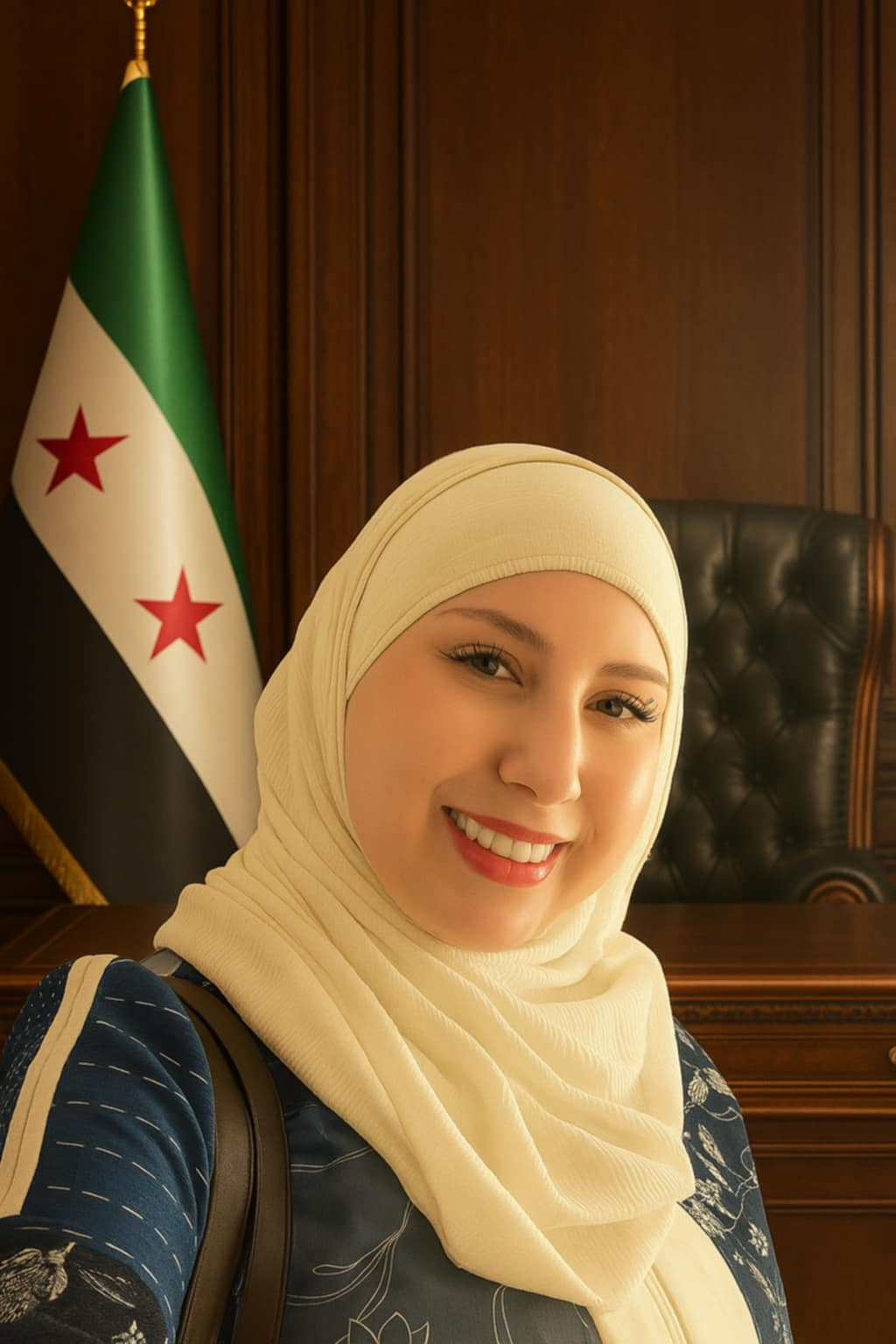
- Tal al-Mallohi in 2025
- Born: January 4, 1991 (age 35); Homs, Syria
- Occupation: Blogger

Tal Dosr al-Mallohi (alternately, al-Mallouhi) (Arabic: طل الملوحي) born January 4, 1991 is a Syrian blogger from Homs. In December 2009, Tal was taken from her home by Syrian forces, which took issue with the contents of her blog (specifically some of the poems she wrote about Palestine, alongside other social commentary).

Tal al-Mallohi was accused by the Syrian government of being a spy for the United States of America, and sentenced on February 15, 2011 to five years in prison. During her ordeal, she was called "the youngest prisoner of conscience in the Arab world".

She was to be released in 2014 but as of late 2023 she remained imprisoned. In December 2024, she was released from prison by rebel forces after the fall of the Assad regime.

== Background ==
Hundreds, if not thousands, of Syrians have been arrested due to their blogging, political activism or expressing their views. Many were sentenced to long prison terms.

Reporters Without Borders reported that at least four influential Syrian internet activists were behind bars in 2009, making Syria one of more than 12 countries which the report classified as "enemies of the Internet". Syrian authorities also banned an estimated 200 websites, including Facebook, YouTube and even Wikipedia, but the Syrians citizens and human rights activists, and most users have found ways to get around the bans.

== Blogs ==
Tal al-Mallohi published her writings in three blogs, one of which is listed under the name "My Blog" and is most likely that she was arrested due to an article or articles published on this blog specifically. Publications on "My blog" consisted of poems and articles in support of the Palestinian cause and critical of the Union for the Mediterranean, which is a diplomatic union pushed by France, between Arab and European states as well as Israel. A picture of Gandhi was published with "will always remain an example" written above it. Many pictures of Sheikh Raed Salah, and the sons of Mahmoud al-Zahar, "martyrs" and pictures of Tayseer Erdogan, with the words "Thank Venezuela", and an image of George W. Bush's face on the body of Adolf Hitler. The background image says "No to torture." Tal's last post, on September 6, 2009, was a poem entitled "Jerusalem, Our Lady of the cities".

Al-Mallohi's second blog was "Letters" (written by Tal "English Latters") and the first "message" posted on this blog was entitled "The First message to man in this world" dated January 19, 2009. Her third blog was titled "The destroyed Palestinian villages" and the latest blog entries from the village of Deir Qaddis dated May 3, 2009.

== Detention ==
Al-Mallohi was arrested by the general security directorate in Damascus on December 27, 2009. The following day, authorities from the Syrian security forces invaded her home—seizing several items, which included her personal computer, along with various books and CDs.

Tal's parents allege that Syrian forces wouldn't relay pertinent information about her alleged crimes, nor were they made aware of where she was being detained.

In September 2010, almost a year after her arrest, Tal's mother, Ahed Mallohi (Ahed al-Mallohi), wrote a letter appealing to Syrian President Bashar al-Assad himself, asking him to intervene and order the release of her daughter. She emphasized that al-Mallohi had no links to "any organizations in Syria, opposition or otherwise." She further reminded al-Assad that the girl's grandfather, Mohammad Dia al-Mallohi, worked under late president Hafez al-Assad as Minister of State for the People's Assembly. Ahed Mallohi said she was promised by "one of the security authorities" that her daughter would be released before the month of Ramadan. However, the month ended without this promise being realized. Rumors began to surface suggesting that Tal was being tortured, which was refuted by Syrian activists at the time.

On 20 September 2010, DP News—a website known for its close ties to the government—published a brief article, which alleged that Tal Mallohi was being held at a correctional facility 20 km northwest of Damascus. Referred to in the report as Duma Women's Prison, sources alleged that the 19-year-old was held on suspicions of espionage. On September 22, Ahed al-Mallohi, in a phone call with the Director of the Syrian Observatory for Human Rights, objected to this story. She asserted that she had visited the prison many times, but personnel always told her that her daughter had not been transferred there.

== Protests against detention ==
"Free Tal Mallohi" protest outside the Syrian embassy in Cairo

The arrest prompted waves of criticism and condemnation by bloggers and Human Rights activists throughout the world. Arab bloggers published attacks on what is considered repressive random arrests in Syria. Since the Syrian government—a regime known for prohibiting political opposition and human rights activism —enacted emergency laws when the Baath Party took power in 1963, they were not obligated to issue an official response to the inquiries into Tal's whereabouts. The Syrian government has made it its policy to not comment on political arrests.

On September 12, 2010, Egyptian human rights activists issued an invitation to organize a protest held in front of the Syrian Embassy in Cairo on September 19, 2010. Protesters pleaded to know her whereabouts, whilst demanding her immediate release. The organization Reporters without Borders was also called upon to pressure the Syrian government to put an immediate end to her captivity.

Similarly, Human Rights Watch demanded the release of Tal al-Mallohi. "Detaining a high school student for nine months without charge is typical of the cruel, arbitrary behavior of Syria's security services," said Sarah Leah Whitson, Middle East director at Human Rights Watch.

Amnesty International said that the detention of al-Mallohi is a "mystery" for the organization, adding that "the case of this student raises many questions, there is no clear reason for her arrest, and isolation from the world in this way". The organization called al-Mallohi a prisoner of conscience, saying that the Syrian government imprisoned her solely because she exercised her right to express her thoughts and aspirations in a peaceful manner.

Protests took place around the world, including in the cities of Cairo, Pakistan, Germany, France, and Washington D.C.. The first Syrian virtual protest took place on October 2, 2010, for the Freedom of Tal al-Mallohi.

== See also ==
- Human Rights in Syria
- Emergency Law
