= Frank Durbin =

Frank J. Durbin (October 19, 1895 – April 25, 1999) was one of the last surviving American veterans of the First World War. Durbin was born in New Hampshire. In 1915, he joined the United States Army at age 20. The next year, he was sent over to Verdun and served with the American and French armies at the Battle of Verdun. While there, Durbin hauled artillery over the front lines. He stayed in the service, guarded the Mexican border in the 1920s, and served in the Second World War as well. After service, he worked for General Motors. By 1963, at age 68, he moved to Florida and stayed there for the rest of his life. He died in Winter Haven at age 103.
