= Shaolin Kempo Karate =

Martial art style

- Also known as: SKK, Villari Kenpo
- Focus: Striking, Kicking, Felling, & Grappling
- Hardness: Full Contact Fight
- Country of origin: United States
- Creator: Fredrick J. Villari
- Parenthood: Karazenpo Goshin Jitsu, Kosho Shorei-ryū Kempo, Shōrin-ryū Karate, Shaolin Kung Fu, Danzan-ryū Jujutsu, Chin Na, Bökh

Shaolin Kempo Karate (or SKK) is a martial art style that combines the Five Animals of Shaolin Kung Fu (Shaolinquan), the core competency of Kenpo, the hard-hitting linear explosiveness of traditional Karate, as well as the power of Western boxing and the felling and grappling arts of Jujutsu, Chin Na, and Mongolian wrestling. This system was founded and developed by Fredrick J. Villari (a former black belt student of Nick Cerio and William Kwai Sun Chow), who devised a hybrid system which integrated the four ways of fighting: striking, kicking, felling, and grappling to eliminate the inherent weakness of martial arts systems that focus on just one or two of fighting techniques.

Shaolin Kempo Karate is primarily taught through a chain of Villari's Martial Arts Centers in the United States and Canada, although there are several unaffiliated organizations that teach variations of the style. These include schools founded by former students of Fred Villari. One of these is Master's Stuidos of Self Defense, these schools are scattered throughout the country, the primary one of which is in Charleston South Carolina.

== What makes it different from other martial arts ==
Shaolin Kempo Karate focuses on the following during training:

Kempos: Systems of moves reminiscent of the fighting styles of the five animals.

Combinations: These are primarily take-downs and there are 20 of them that are learned before black belt.

Forms: These are broken into two categories into which most of the fighting forms fall into. These two main categories are Katas and Pinans. There are 5 of each that are learned before black belt in addition to a fan form, a bo staff form and one similar to the fan form called Stature of the crane.

== History & Development ==
The roots of Shaolin Kempo Karate can be traced back to three main sources of Asian martial arts:

1. The Shaolin Temple where Kung Fu and other Chinese martial arts are commonly referred to as "boxing" or "temple boxing". The Chinese aspect of the art is also the source of the 5 basic animal forms: Tiger, Crane, Snake, Leopard, and Dragon which all have very different postures and focuses.
2. The Yoshida and Komatsu clans of Japan who founded the system of Kenpō. James Mitose was a member of the Yoshida family, and is commonly credited as the founder of modern Kenpo/Kempo.
3. Mongolian, Chinese & Tibetan wrestling from which most Asian grappling arts (such as Chin Na and Jujutsu) descended.

Because of the diversity of Asian, Polynesian, and American culture in Hawaii, the arts of Kenpo, Kajukenbo (which was an early hybrid martial art), and Kenpo Karate were formulated mostly by street fighters like William Chow and Adriano Emperado. Ed Parker helped bring Kenpo to mainstream America through his work in Hollywood and with celebrities such as Elvis Presley and Bruce Lee. Through later work of George Pesare and Nick Cerio, Kenpo was brought to the East Coast of the United States, where Cerio would meet and train Villari. Villari's use of Kenpo, which he later changed to "Kempo," would be the vehicle by which he would bind together the principles of the traditional martial arts:

Villari's martial arts training started early in his life. After being introduced to Western and Chinese boxing by his father, Villari went on to study jiujitsu and wrestling with the LeBlanc brothers in his middle teens. By the time he was 18, Villari realized his martial arts training was stagnating and sought out Nick Cerio as an instructor of Chinese kenpo. After completing his requirements as second degree black belt with Cerio, Villari traveled to the West Indies where he traded his techniques for karate and kung-fu training. While in the islands, Villari also studied under a Chinese-Australian instructor Soo, and gained his third and fourth degrees. After working with another master Len Chou, Villari received his fifth degree and soon decided to open his own school.

The original Shaolin Kempo Karate school was United Studios of Self Defense, later becoming Fred Villari's Studio of Self Defense. It was under this name that the SKK style spread across the United States and throughout the world. At its peak, there were more than 300 Villari franchised martial arts schools worldwide.

The development of the system consisted mainly of mastering several existing martial arts, removing movements Villari deemed inefficient, and then integrating the remaining movements into a cohesive system. Fred Villari borrowed heavily from the following in the development of SKK:

1. Shaolin Kung Fu is the "backbone" of SKK for its circular punches and kicks, but mainly for the incorporation of the 5 animals: Tiger, Crane, Dragon, Snake, and Leopard. Shaolin arts also emphasize a sense of balance and a lifestyle of health and fitness. Shaolin animal strikes and methods used by Villari are included more prominently in the higher ranks of SKK and are thus less apparent to a casual observer or low ranking student.
2. Karate for its mechanical style as well as linear and angular movements combined with quick shuffles and explosive attacks. Nearly everything taught in the first three levels of SKK is rooted in traditional Karate, which had led to much of the criticism of the system using the term "Shaolin" when the casual observer or young student would be learning little else but Karate stances, strikes, and blocking methods until they have achieved the rank of purple belt.
3. Kenpō for its non-dogmatic approach to fighting systems and a mixture of both hard and soft movements that blend nicely in combinations. Kempo is taught slowly to beginners in SKK, but is increasingly prevalent in intermediate, advanced, and master levels of the system. It is also a noticeable source of many black belt forms in SKK.
4. Chin Na, Jujutsu, & Mongolian wrestling for their varying focuses on different aspects of holding, seizing, locking, throwing, felling and delivering pain that can be controlled.

Aside from use of specific and traceable Asian lineage, a wealth of material was created by Fred Villari himself, and still further material was "Demystified" for the sake of being shared with the masses. From this breadth of source material and original work by Villari, Shaolin Kempo Karate was codified to include 108 fighting combinations and the following katas:

Two Man Fist Set, Sho Tun Kwok, 12 Hands of the Tiger, Nengli South, Nengli North, 11 Hands of Buddha, Invincible Wall, Branches of the Falling Pine, Lost Leopard, Iron Fortress, Tai Sing Mon, 1000 Buddhas, Five Dragons Face the Four Winds, Wounded Tigers, Immortal Monkey and the Plum Tree Blocking System.

== Four Ways of Fighting ==
Shaolin Kempo Karate is built on the notion that all martial arts styles can be characterized as using one or more of the "four ways of fighting"

1. Striking: to use of any part of the arms (e.g. open or closed hand, elbows, or forearms)
2. Kicking: to use of any part of the leg (e.g. foot, shin, or knee)
3. Felling: to knock an opponent off his feet (e.g. by throwing, pulling, or shoving)
4. Grappling: to clutch or grip (e.g. wrestling, holding, or locking joints).

Belts: White, Yellow, Orange, Purple, Blue, Blue/Green, Green, Green/Brown, Brown (With 3 degrees.), Black (With 10 degrees.),

Shaolin Kempo Karate has 21 belt ranks (excluding all black belt ranks). New students begin at white belt and progress as they demonstrate requisite proficiency. Ranks are represented by the color of belt worn. In addition, there are also multiple midterms for belts purple and above. Belts are given about every two months from white to green, 4 months for green to brown, 6 months for first and second degree black belt ranks, and up to four years onward. This is all dependent on the way the instructor determines when the student is ready to test depending on skill.

The grading in Shaolin Kempo Karate consists mainly in the demonstration of techniques, combinations, and forms as well as application of knowledge in sparring. In addition, students are placed in various situations that will help them develop a stronger and more logical mind in simulated self-defense scenarios. Forms consist of a display of footwork with kicks and punches as well as displacements.

== Controversies ==
Largely due to the both rapid growth of his chain of martial arts schools and claims Villari had made regarding his codification of an "unbeatable" fighting system, Villari and his business have been the subject of criticism in the martial arts community. One frequently criticized aspect of the Villari business organization is the ability of "distance learning", in which students are able to learn ranks through black belt by purchasing a series of DVDs and then filming themselves performing the techniques. Villari claims that one of the key reasons for online or DVD training is to reach the masses where martial arts or Shaolin Kempo Karate do not exist.

== See also ==
- G. D. Baum - American practitioner and writer whose character does the art.
- Shaolin (martial arts)
- Kenpo
- Karate
