= Timeline of martial arts =

Because of the lack of historical records, the secretive nature of the teacher-student relationships, and political circumstances, the history of martial arts is challenging to document precisely. It is likely that many techniques were learned, forgotten, and re-learned during human history.

== Bronze Age (3000 to 1000 BCE) ==
- 180th century BCE – Wrestling, the oldest combat sport, first appeared in carvings and drawings in southern Europe. While its foundational origins lie in global prehistory, different styles of wrestling were created independently and practiced throughout the world at various times in human history.
- 20th century BCE – Murals were inscribed in tomb 15 at Beni Hasan, depicting wrestling techniques, in present-day Egypt (in Africa).
- 19th century BCE – Celtic wrestling (which evolved into Cornish wrestling, Gouren, Collar-and-elbow wrestling, etc) was described as being part of the Tailteann Games which continued until the time of the Normans.
- 18th century BCE – The newly created Babylonian Gilgamesh epic included the major hand-held weapons (sword, axe, bow and spear) used prior to the gunpowder era.

== Iron Age and Antiquity (1000 BCE to CE 500) ==
- 8th century BCE – Roughly the start of Greek Olympic Competition. Through the popularity of the Olympics, martial arts like pankration flourished.
- 8th century BCE – Homer's newly created Iliad described many scenes of hand-to-hand combat in detail.
- 6th century BCE – Ten styles of Śastravidyā were said to have been created in India at this time.
- c.4th century BCE – Newly created Indian epic poetry and the Vedas gave the earliest written mention of South Asian martial arts.
- 50 BCE – The earliest records of an ancient Korean martial arts, Subak and Gakjeo, were created at this time and found in paintings in the Muyong-chong and Gakjeo-chong from the Goguryeo period.
- CE 72 – The Colosseum opened in Rome, providing the public with the world's largest martial arts venue for over the next three hundred years.
- CE 1st century – Buddhist texts of this time such as the Lotus Sutra mentioned a number of South Asian fighting arts, while the Khandhaka discouraged their practice.
- CE 2nd century – P.Oxy. III 466, a Greek papyrus manuscript on wrestling, was written. It is the earliest known European martial arts manual.
- CE 477 – The first abbot of Shaolin Monastery was Buddhabadra, an Indian Dhyana master who came to China in AD 464 to translate Buddhist texts to Chinese. The Shaolin Temple was built at the western base of the Chinese Songshan mountain range, at the orders of Emperor Xiaowen. Successive Chinese emperors authorized fighting monks to train in the temple.

== Middle Ages (500 to 1500) ==
- 550 – Indian monk Bodhidarma taught what will be called Chan Buddhism. While there is no evidence he was involved in the martial arts, folklore later linked him to the creation of qigong and Shaolin fist, as well as crediting him with introducing forms into silat. Chán and its Japanese offshoot Zen Buddhism were influential among martial artists.
- c.700 – Kuvalaymala described non-keshatriya students learning martial arts from Hindu priests at gurukula or traditional educational institutions.
- 728 – This was the date of the "combat stele" at the Shaolin Monastery.
- 782 – At this time the Japanese Heian period began, and curved swords called tachi (large sword) appeared. Although samurai did not technically appear until the 12th century, in appearance these are the early curved swords commonly recognized as "samurai swords."
- c.800–900 – The newly created Agni Purana, the earliest known manual of dhanurveda, listed over 130 weapons, described dozens of fighting stances, named techniques for various weapons, and provided a detailed discussion on archery.
- 966–979 – A stone inscription dated 966 AD from Prasat Ta Siu temple in Cambodia, known as the inscription of Kok Samron, recounted a boxing match ordered by royal decree. Another inscription dated 979 AD from Prasat Char temple mentions the names of four boxers: Dan, In, Ayak, and Vit.
- 1124–1138 – Manasollasa, written by King Someswara, gave the names of Indian wrestling techniques, training exercises and diet.
- 1156–1185 – The Japanese samurai class emerged during the warring period between the Taira and Minamoto families. The warrior code of bushido also emerged during this time.
- c.1200 – Kalaripayattu is a martial art developed in Kerala; although its origin is unknown, according to historians, it was practiced since "at least" the 12th century.
- 1200–1300 – Bas-reliefs in Angkor depicted armed and unarmed combat.
- c.1200 – Malla Purana, the oldest known text describing the techniques of malla-yuddha, was created.
- c.1300 – MS I.33, the oldest extant martial arts manual detailing armed combat, was created.
- 1338 – This was the beginning of the Japanese Ashikaga era, during which the samurai class expanded its influence further. Many schools of swordsmanship flourished. The period ended around 1500.
- 1346 – The first annual Kırkpınar tournament was held in Edirne in Turkish Thrace
- 1400 – China sent delegations to Okinawa, which then began trading extensively with China and Japan. The indigenous Okinawan unarmed combat art called ti or te (hand) was likely influenced by Chinese and Japanese arts over the next three centuries, forming the basis for modern karate.
- 1477 – The Okinawan king Sho Shin, influenced by the Japanese, banned the carrying of arms. Similar bans occurred in Japan in 1586. Both apparently led to the underground development of striking arts and may have encouraged unarmed combat techniques designed for use against armored soldiers, such as jujutsu.
- 1400s – Stanton became the Cornish wrestling champion of Cornwall at a tournament in Penzance, in the fifteenth century.

== Early Modern period (1500 to 1800) ==
- c. 1500 – Firearms become increasingly prevalent in Europe, diminishing the importance of traditional armed fighting systems.
- 1520 – At the Field of the Cloth of Gold (the summit meeting between the English King Henry VIII and the French King Francis I) there were extensive Cornish wrestling matches, including between the monarchs themselves.
- 1521 – Spanish conquistadors arrived in the Philippines, recording that the native population fought them off with broadswords and bamboo spears.
- 1527 – Mughals invaded India, bringing Middle Eastern weaponry to South Asia and, indirectly, to the Malay Archipelago. Indigenous malla-yuddha was supplanted by the Persian-derived pehlwani.
- 16th–19th centuries – Most of South and Southeast Asia gradually came under European colonial rule. Martial practices were discouraged, in some places banned outright and preserved in secret.
- 1549 – Hayashizaki Minamoto was born, later founding the art of iajutsu or iaido, the art of drawing and cutting with the sword in a single motion. Successive masters of his school can be traced to the present day.
- 1600 – A newer style samurai sword, called a katana or daito, was widely used. Afro-Brazilian slaves began to develop the art of capoeira.
- 1621 – Wubei Zhi was compiled by Mao Yuanyi; it included individual martial arts training with different weapons such as the spear and Dao.
- 1641 – Chinese rebels under Li Zicheng sacked the Shaolin Monastery for its support of the Ming government. While the monastery would be later rebuilt and patronized by the Qing government, it lost its fighting force and its place as a center of martial arts development.
- 1643 – Legendary Japanese swordsman Miyamoto Musashi is believed to have written The Book of Five Rings at this time; it is a seminal work regarding the art and philosophy of the samurai and swordsmanship.
- 1669 – Charles II provided £1000 in prize money for a Cornish wrestling competition in St James's Park.
- 1674 – The Maratha Empire was founded by the warrior Shivaji, bringing his native art of mardani khel to prominence.
- 1699 – Faced with growing intolerance from the Mughal rulers, Guru Gobind Singh militarized the Sikh community in order to defend their faith and independence. Sikhs and Panjabis in general subsequently became renowned as a warrior community.
- 1700s – Chinese temple frescoes depicted Shaolin monks practicing unarmed combat. Okinawan te and Chinese Shaolin boxing styles mixed as part of trade between the countries. Wing Chun was also founded in Yunnan.
- 1713 – Sir Thomas Parkyns, known as the ‘Wrestling Baronet’, published his detailed book on Cornish wrestling, The Inn-Play: or, the Cornish Hugg-Wrestler, which was reprinted many times.
- 1743 – Jack Broughton, an English bare-knuckle fighter, wrote the first rules of boxing, later to become the London Prize Ring rules in 1838.
- 1750 – Techniques of taijiquan were written down.
- 1752 – The ‘Cornwall and Devon Wrestling Society’ was formed; it ran Cornish wrestling tournaments and matches in London with the Prince of Wales (Duke of Cornwall) as patron.
- 1767 – Burmese forces captured Siam’s capital of Ayutthaya and burned the kingdom's archives, including manuals on boxing and swordsmanship.
- 1790 – Muyedobotongji was commissioned by King Jeongjo of Korea and written by Yi Deokmu, Pak Jega, and Baek Dongsu. It is one of the most comprehensive pre-modern military manuals of East Asia.

== 19th century ==
- 1800–1900 – Brazilian police periodically arrested anyone caught practicing capoeira. In 1862 alone, 404 people were arrested for capoeira.
- 1825–1900 – Savate shifted from its street-fighting roots to a modern sport.
- 1826 – James Polkinghorne and Abraham Cann had a famous Cornish wrestling match (with a disputed outcome), in 23 October at Devonport, with an audience of 17,000.
- 1867 – John Graham Chambers published a revised set of rules for boxing. They were publicly endorsed by John Douglas, 9th Marquess of Queensberry, leading the rules to become known as the "Marquess of Queensberry rules".
- 1872 – A Cornish wrestling tournament in Japan was organised by the Royal Marine Light Infantry.
- 1882 – Jigoro Kano modified traditional Japanese jujutsu to develop the art of judo. He opened a school, Kodokan Judo Institute. One of his training methods, called randori, removed more dangerous striking techniques to emphasize grappling and submission locks between students practising at full-force. His students taught judo using randori around the world during the early 20th century.
- 1892 – The first world heavyweight boxing championship was fought under the Marquess of Queensberry rules of 1867, which are similar to those used today. Jim Corbett defeated John L. Sullivan.
- 1890s – The British introduction of western boxing to India resulted in a decline of native musti-yuddha until it survived only in Varanasi.
- 1893–1901 – Edward William Barton-Wright studied jujutsu in Japan and created Bartitsu upon returning to England, one of the earliest introductions of Japanese martial arts in the West and the first known system to combine Asian and European fighting styles.
- 1896 – Fencing and Greco-Roman wrestling became Olympic sports, along with shooting.
- 1899 – New York governor Theodore Roosevelt started Cornish wrestling training three times a week under Professor Mike J. Dwyer, who would go on to gain the world title in 1902.
- 1900 – Archery made its debut at the Olympics.

== 20th century ==
- Early 1900s – In the early 1900s Edith Garrud became the first British female teacher of jiu-jitsu, and one of the first female martial arts instructors in the Western world.
- 1904 – Freestyle wrestling became an Olympic sport.
- 1904–1906 - Yamashita Yoshitsugu gave judo lessons to President Theodore Roosevelt in 1904 and taught judo at the U.S. Naval Academy in 1905 and 1906.
- 1908 – Amateur boxing became an Olympic Sport.
- 1920–1925 – Mitsuyo Maeda, a student of Jigoro Kano's, traveled to Brazil (among other places) to spread judo. In 1925, Carlos Gracie, a student of Mitsuyo Maeda, opened his school, the first for Brazilian Jiu-Jitsu. The art was further refined by the Gracie family thereafter, particularly by Carlos' brother Helio Gracie.
- 1920s–30s – Timed rounds, weight classes and standardized rules were introduced to Southeast Asian kickboxing under European influence. Modern gloves were made compulsory, replacing the hemp rope bindings, resulting in less grievous injuries and fewer deaths but also making many traditional techniques illegal. In Thailand, the newer ring-style became known as muay Thai (Thai boxing) while the older form became known as muay boran (ancient boxing).
- 1923 – The different regional Cornish wrestling associations within Cornwall merged into the Cornwall County Wrestling Association ("CCWA"), under the patronage of Commander Sir Edward Nicholl and presidency of Lord St Levan.
- 1925 – Seishiro Okazaki (1890–1951) founded Danzan-ryū (檀山流), a ryū of jujutsu, in Hawaii. The Danzan-ryū syllabus is syncretic, and includes non-Japanese elements.
- 1926 – Women have trained in the Kodokan Judo Institute since 1926, but originally always separately from men. In 1962, after "pulverizing" the other students in the women's training group, Rena Kanokogi became the first woman allowed to train in the men's group at the Kodokan.
- 1928 – Shaolin temple records were burned, destroying many documents and records of earlier martial arts.
- 1930s – Imi Lichtenfeld began developing Krav Maga in Czechoslovakia
- 1932 – Mestre Bimba opened the first capoeira school, calling the style Luta Regional Baiana ("regional fight from Bahia"), because capoeira was still illegal in name.
- 1935 – “Karate” became the official name of the Okinawan martial arts, based on the traditional art of te (hand) and the term kara (empty or unarmed).
- 1936 – Gichin Funakoshi published the first edition of his book Karate-Do Kyohan, documenting much of the philosophy and traditional kata (forms) of modern karate. A second edition was published in 1973, many years after his death in 1957.
- 1936 – James Masayoshi Mitose started in the United States the art of Kenpo, which he learned in Japan. His style, known as Kosho Shorei-Ryū Kenpo, became an important martial art in Hawaii.
- 1936 Wushu's first Olympic appearance, at the 1936 Summer Olympics as an unofficial exhibition event
- 1938 – Sambo was presented by Anatoly Kharlampiev; Nguyễn Lộc introduced Vovinam to the public.
- 1938 – Bokator appeared in the first Khmer dictionary.
- 1942 – Morihei Ueshiba began using the term aikido to describe his art, which is related to aiki-jujutsu.
- 1943 – Judo, karate, and various Chinese systems were officially introduced in Korea, likely beginning to mix with the indigenous Korean arts.
- 1944 – William Kwai Sun Chow, a James Mitose Kenpo student in Honolulu (Hawaii), began to teach his particular style of Kenpo developed in the 1930s, called Kara-Ho Kempo, which would be the fundamental base for the American Kenpo Karate.
- 1944-1945 – Hwang Kee opened the first Korean Tang Soo Do dojang or martial arts schools in Seoul, Korea. Many other schools followed. Korean military personnel received training in martial arts.
- 1945 – Choi Yong-sool traveled back to Korea after living in Japan with Sokaku Takeda. He began teaching Dai Dong Yusool (daitō-ryū aiki-jūjutsu), later to become known as hapkido.
- 1945 – World War II ended, with many more American and British soldiers stationed in Asia exposed to the region's fighting systems. This includes the American Robert Trias who began teaching Asian-based martial arts in Phoenix, Arizona.
- 1948 – The Indonesian Pencak Silat Association (IPSI) was founded.
- 1949–1950 – Ip Man left Foshan and moved to Hong Kong to escape the communist government and began teaching Wing Chun to his first Hong Kong student Leung Sheung.
- 1950 – Adriano Emperado, a William Chow student, opened his first school of a hybrid martial art called Kajukenbo (the first American mixed martial art), developed in Oahu (Hawaii) with four other Masters: Joseph Holck (Kodokan Judo, Danzan-ryu Jujutsu), Peter Young Yil Choo (Tang soo doo, Boxing and Shotokan Karate), Frank Ordonez (Danzan-ryu Jujutsu) and Clarence Chang (Sil-Lum Pai Gongfu).
- 1954 – Ed Parker, another William Chow student, opened the first school in the western United States in Provo, Utah, of a new style developed on the Chow's Kara-Ho Kempo: the famous American Kenpo Karate.
- 1955 – On April 11 General Choi called a meeting between Korean masters to unify the Korean martial arts.
- 1957 – Nine Korean training halls united under the name taekwondo (way of the foot and fist).
- 1959 – Bruce Lee arrived in America and began to teach Chinese Wing chun\Kung Fu style to his first student, African American Jesse Glover, the first documented instance of a westerner learning Chinese martial arts.
- 1959-1960 – Attempts were made to unify kwons (KTA) and change the name from Tang Soo Do to Taekwondo. Not all schools followed this, resulting in different style names with their own Hyeong.
- 1962 – Women have trained in the Kodokan Judo Institute since 1926, but originally always separately from men. In 1962, after "pulverizing" the other students in the women's training group, Rena Kanokogi became the first woman allowed to train in the men's group at the Kodokan.
- 1964 – Kyokushin Kaikan, a style of stand-up full-contact karate, was founded by Masutatsu Oyama.
- 1964 – Men's judo became an Olympic sport.
- 1966 – The International Taekwon-Do Federation (ITF) was formed.
- 1967 – Bruce Lee founded the hybrid martial art system Jeet Kune Do which derives aspects from various stand-up and ground style martial arts including Chinese Kung Fu.
- 1969 – Mike Sandos and Al Dacascos traveled to China and learned to integrate the soft method to their Kajukenbo and developed Wun Hop Kuen Do.
- 1969 – Greek-American Jim Arvanitis introduced a modern reconstruction of pankration.
- 1972 – The first Kajukenbo school in Europe appeared: a second generation Emperado student, Sergeant Ed Sheppard, Air Force, arrived at Torrejon de Ardoz Air Base (Madrid - Spain) and opened his first Kajukenbo school for basic soldiers.
- 1972 – In November 1972, following a letter campaign against the rule prohibiting women from being promoted to higher than 5th dan, Keiko Fukuda and her senpai Masako Noritomi (1913–1982) became the first women promoted to 6th dan by the Kodokan Judo Institute.
- 1973 – The Bruce Lee film Enter the Dragon popularized Chinese and other forms of Martial arts. He died that same year.
- 1973 – The World Taekwondo Federation (WTF) was formed.
- 1974 – The first Professional Karate Association (PKA) World Championships were held bringing Kickboxing to prominence in the United States.
- 1975 – Bruce Lee's book Tao of Jeet Kune Do was published post-mortem. The book was based on the hybrid martial art and philosophies created by him, which created a different style in martial art system.
- 1980 – The first women's world championships in judo were held, in New York.
- 1981 – Mak Yuree formed the first Butthan school in Bangladesh.
- 1982 – Tony Blauer created the "Panic Attack" drill that would become the Spear System.
- 1985 – Satoru Sayama formed Shooto, a shootwrestling organization. It would go on to become the first mixed martial arts organization in the world. A Ukrainian martial art based on Cossack combat traditions, Combat Hopak, was formed.
- 1988 – WTF-style taekwondo became an Olympic demonstration sport, later becoming a full-medal sport in 2000.
- 1992 – Women's judo became an Olympic sport.
- 1993 – The first Ultimate Fighting Championship (UFC) was held. Brazilian Jiu-Jitsu practitioner Royce Gracie won the event.
- 1994 – Keiko Fukuda became the first woman to be awarded a rare red belt (at the time for women still marking the 8th dan rank) in judo by the Kodokan Judo Institute.

== 21st century ==
- 2000 – Smackgirl held their first women's mixed martial arts competition.
- 2000 – Taekwondo became an Olympic sport. It started as a demonstration event at the 1988 games in Seoul, a year after becoming a medal event at the Pan Am Games, and became an official medal event at the 2000 games in Sydney.
- 2000 - By the early 2000s, Brazilian jiu-jitsu became a sport that is known worldwide.
- 2001 – After Zuffa buys Ultimate Fighting Championship and Dana White becomes the CEO, MMA becomes a sport that enjoys worldwide recognition.
- 2002 – U.S. Army officially codified the Modern Army Combatives Program (MACP) into official doctrine with the publication of field manual FM 3-25.150.
- 2003 – Eddie Bravo created 10th Planet Jiu-Jitsu.
- 2006 – The Kodokan Judo Institute awarded Keiko Fukuda the 9th degree black belt (9th dan), making her the first woman to hold this rank from any recognized Judo organization.
- 2009 – Modern Arnis was declared as the national sport of the Philippines.
- 2009 – The first annual Battle of the Nations would take place, codifying and unifying the burgeoning sport of armored combat.
- 2011 – The Mongolian National Wrestling Match was held with the attendance of 6002 wrestlers, becoming the largest wrestling competition in the world.
- 2011 – Keiko Fukuda became the first woman promoted to a 10th degree black belt in judo.
- 2021 – Karate appeared as an Olympic sport for Tokyo 2020.
