= Edmund Parker =

Edmund Parker may refer to:

- Ed Parker (Edmund Kealoha Parker, 1931–1990), American martial artist, promoter, teacher, and author
- Ed Parker Jr. (Edmund Kealoha Parker, born 1959), American martial arts practitioner and artist
- Edmund Parker, 2nd Earl of Morley (1810–1864), British peer and Whig politician
- Edmund Parker, 4th Earl of Morley (1877–1905), British peer and Devon landowner
- Edmund Parker Jr. House, historic house in Winchester, Massachusetts
- Edmund Parker (sexton)

== See also ==
- Albert Parker, 3rd Earl of Morley (Albert Edmund Parker, 1843–1905), British peer politician
