= Martin T. Buell =

American karateka (1942–2023)

Martin Thomas Buell (August 31, 1942 in Honolulu, Hawaii – March 24, 2023) was an American karateka who founded the Universal Kempo Karate Schools Association in 1981. Headquartered in Aiea, Hawaii, Universal Kempo teaches Chinese Kempo Karate, and has branches throughout the United States. Buell was a commissioner for the Professional Karate Association, and a rating chairman for Karate Illustrated Magazine.

Buell, who was of Irish and Chinese ancestry, began his martial arts career at the Kaimuki YMCA in Honolulu where he studied in 1953. He trained in “Kenpo” at the Central YMCA, Honolulu in 1956, and in 1957 Buell began his training with Adriano Emperado in the Kajukenbo System, and continued his studies at the Kajukenbo Kaimuki YMCA Branch.

Buell received his black belt in 1966, his second degree in 1969, and his third degree in 1970. He was promoted to a fifth degree Chief Instructor after spending many years as a trainer and teacher. In 1982, Universal Kempo's board of directors awarded Buell the rank of Professor, 10th Degree.

== Competitions ==
Buell was a strong fighter who had won many sparring matches in tournament competitions:

- Kajukenbo Championships (1968 Most Outstanding Competitor)
- All Hawaii Karate Championships (1968 Runner Up)
- All American Championships (1969 Most Outstanding Competitor)
- Hawaii All Stars (1978 Coach) - participated at the Professional Karate Association Championships in Baltimore, Maryland
