= Nicholas Raymond Cerio =

American martial artist

Nick Cerio
- Born: Nicholas Raymond Cerio; July 9, 1936 (United States) Boston, Massachusetts
- Died: October 7, 1998 (aged 62); Warwick, Rhode Island; Cancer
- Nationality: American
- Style: Kenpo, Judo, Jiu Jitsu, Boxing, Kung Fu, Nick Cerio's Kenpo
- Teachers: George McCabe, George Pesare, William Kwai Sun Chow(2 weeks), Bill Chun, Sr.(2 weeks), Edmund Parker, James Benko, Larry Garron, Tadashi Yamashita, Gan Fong Chin, Gee Gin Soon
- Rank: 10th dan black belt in Nick Cerio's Kenpo; 9th dan black belt in Kenpo Karate; 8th dan black belt in Sil Lum Kung Fu 3rd dan black belt in Kenpo Karate; 1st dan black belt in Hakkoryo Jujutsu; 1st dan black belt in Karazenpo Go Shinjutsu

Other information
- Notable students: Frederick J Villari
- Website: http://www.nickcerioskenpo.com/

Nicholas Raymond Cerio (July 9, 1936 — October 7, 1998) was an American martial artist. He was born in Boston, Massachusetts.

== Biography ==
Nick Cerio was born July 9, 1936, in Boston, Massachusetts. At a very young age, he took on many odd jobs to raise money to help support his family. At the age of 10, he moved with his family to the Federal Hill, Providence, Rhode Island.

== Martial arts training and lineage ==
=== Early training ===
In his youth Cerio initially became interested in boxing as a teenager. Cerio began martial arts training under George McCabe after being exposed to judo in the Air Force.

=== Karazenpo Go Shinjutsu ===
He then studied Karazenpo Go Shinjutsu under George Pesare and received his first black belt in May 1966. Cerio opened his first martial arts school, Cerio’s Academy of Martial Arts. Through his participation in karate tournaments he came in contact with Edmund Parker. They would have a relationship that spanned nearly twenty years.

==== William Kwai Sun Chow ====
After Cerio met with William Chun, Sr. (Chow’s senior student), he was granted permission to study with Chow. Cerio visited Hawaii for two weeks in the mid to late 1960s to live and study with Chow. In training, Cerio made to assume low, painful stances and throw as much as 500 weighted, full force punches. If he relaxed his stance, more punches were required. Cerio often commented on this period's influence on him and the development of his system, Nick Cerio's Kenpo.

==== Edmund Parker ====
Cerio considered Ed Parker his senior, mentor and coach because he offered great insight and he was a great resource in contributing to the formation of Nick Cerio's Kenpo:

“Ed Parker was never my instructor, but more like my coach. He was my senior because we came from the same kenpo family. I used a lot of Ed Parker’s ideas in my system.” (Liedke, Inside Kung Fu)

Cerio never learned all of the curricula of Parker’s American Kenpo, however he was awarded a 3rd degree black belt in Kenpo Karate (Sandan) by Parker. Parker awarded Cerio a 9th degree black belt (Kudan) in Kenpo Karate in 1983.

==== Hakkoryu Jujutsu ====
During the late 1960s Cerio studied Hakkoryu Jujutsu, first receiving his brown belt in 1968 from James Benko and later received his 1st black belt (Shodan) from Larry Garron.

==== Tadashi Yamashita ====
Cerio studied Okinawan weapons and self-defense under Tadashi Yamashita, who in 1970 awarded him a 4th black belt (Yondan) and in 1973, a 5th black belt (Godan).

==== Gan Fong Chin ====
Cerio was tutored by Master Gan Fong Chin while developing his chinese kenpo style in the early 1970s and Chin presented him with a 8th black belt (Hachidan) and title of Sifu in August 1973.

=== Nick Cerio’s Kenpo ===
Cerio modified what he had learned from his limited time with Chow, Chun, Sr. Also, from his time with Pesare, and his other teachers mentioned above, and added many things from judo, jujitsu, boxing, kung fu and Shotokan. He added many kata to his system, both open-hand and weapon. Cerio incorporated variations of Shotokan forms into his system. He felt their strong stances and transitions were missing from the kenpo forms that he had been taught.

=== Influence ===
Cerio can be credited with both expanding and helping to popularize kenpo on the east coast, more specifically New England.

In 1989 he was given the title of professor by Thomas Burdine and was given the equivalent of his 10th dan again by Burdine but this time representing the World Council of Sokes. He founded a branch of kenpo known as 'Nick Cerio’s Kenpo' which he built up to an organization of more than 65 schools in the United States, Canada, Europe and South Africa.

== Sources ==
- John Corcoran, Emil Farkas, Martial Arts Traditions, History, People, W.H. Smith, 1981. LCCN 82-11940
- Nick Cerio, Nancy Cerio. Nick Cerio's Kenpo, Library of Congress catalog card no. TX 1-401-371, 1984, second printing 1998
- Klouvatos, George. "Nick Cerio's Kenpo The Man and His Style" Oriental Fighting Arts, April 1975: 24–31
- Breen, Andrew. "Professor Nick Cerio, Evolution Of A Kenpo Master" Inside Kung Fu, July 1997: 40–45, 102–103
- Liedke, Bob. "Nick Cerio, Kenpo's Forgotten Leader" Inside Kung Fu, October 1989: 43–46
- Liedke, Bob. "Portrait of a Kenpo Master Instructor Profile Interview" TaeKwonDo Times, November 1987: 54–57
