= Jim Shon =

State legislator, government official, author and columnist

James T. Shon, Ph.D

Member of the Hawaii House of Representatives from the 24th district 28th (1984–1992)
- In office 1984–1996
- Preceded by: Reynaldo Graulty
- Succeeded by: Sam Aiona

Personal details
- Born: Syracuse, NY
- Party: Democratic
- Education: Syracuse University; University of Hawaiʻi at Mānoa

Jim Shon is a writer, former school administrator, former state representative, and activist in Hawaii. He served in the state house as a Democrat first elected in 1984. He lost his seat in the 1996 election.

He was born in Syracuse, New York and graduated from Jamesville-DeWitt High School and Syracuse University with a degree in music education. Before moving to Hawaii, he served in Korea with the Peace Corps, teaching English as a second language on Jeju Island. In 1973, Shon enrolled at the University of Hawaiʻi at Mānoa as a graduate student in Korean history.

Shon has written several novels. He is also writes newspaper columns and wrote a book about overseeing the establishment of Hawaii's Charter School system.

Shon led Hawaii's nascent Charter Schools program until he was fired from the post in 2006. He served as director of the Hawaii Education Policy Center.

== Writings ==
- Poison in Paradise
- The Case of the Good Deed, co-author with Masa Hagino
- The Case of the Rainforest Reunion

=== Non-fiction ===
- A Charter School Story
- Inside Hawaii's Capital
