= Kara-Ho Kempo =

Hawaiian martial art

- Focus: Vital Point striking
- Hardness: Unknown
- Country of origin: Territory of Hawaii
- Creator: William Kwai Sun Chow
- Famous practitioners: Ron Alo, Sam Alama Kuoha, Ka'imi Kuoha, Bart Vale
- Parenthood: Kosho Shorei-ryu Kempo
- Descendant arts: Kajukenbo, American Kenpo, Hawaiian Kempo

Kara-Ho Kempo (the unity of spirit, mind, soul and body, fist law) is a martial art created in the 1930s by the late William Kwai Sun Chow of Hawaii (July 3, 1914 - September 21, 1987). The system can best be described as a series of rapid strikes (punches and kicks) to the vital areas of an opponent. The system calls for an equal use of both the hands and feet and, also, teaches self-defense techniques against weapons and multiple attackers.

Part of the Kara-Ho Kempo curriculum consists of empty hand and weapons kata, featuring weapons originating in Ryukyu (modern day Okinawa, Japan), China, and the Philippines with 18 weapons total and 3 kata for each weapon.

== Kwai Sun Company ==
Kara-Ho Kempo is overseen by the Kwai Sun Company, an organization created in 1978 by Chow and his top student Samuel Alama Kuoha. This organization is responsible for maintaining student records and membership, as well as the training and dan rank promotions for the roughly 150 schools worldwide. All rank certificates and diplomas are numbered and issued directly by The Kwai Sun Company.

Kara-Ho Kempo is currently headed by Sam Kuoha (10th dan), but the organization, also, has an International Board of Directors composed of black belt instructors that aid in creating and maintaining the stringent rules and guidelines for the system.

Chow's Chinese Kara-Ho Kempo currently has a membership of about 5000 students,, most of which are in the United States.

== See also ==
Kenpo

== Sources ==
- Sam Kuoha and Ka'imi Kuoha "Chinese Kara-Ho Kempo Volume One". Unique Publications, 2000
