= Mark Arnott =

American actor, martial artist

- Born: Chicago, Illinois, U.S.
- Occupations: Actor, martial artist, author
- Years active: 1978 – Present
- Spouses: Jane Carr (m. 1987; div. 1995) Melissa Chase (m. 2009)

Mark Arnott is an American actor and martial artist. He appeared in a recurring role as Mark on the NBC television show Cheers, and as Jeff Andrews in Return of the Secaucus 7, John Sayles' debut film as a director. He also appeared in Joan of Arcadia, The Bernie Mac Show, NYPD Blue and Mickey Spillane's Mike Hammer.

== Life and work ==
He attended Dartmouth College in New Hampshire as a member of the class of 1972, but took some time off to travel the country in the late 1960s and build two Harlequin Dinner Theaters, one in Rockville, Maryland and one in Atlanta, before graduating with the class of 1975 Dartmouth gave him a Marcus Heiman Award which grant enabled him to study with Stella Adler in New York City.

His earliest recorded film appearance was as Jeff in Return of the Secaucus 7. His first Equity role was as Quasimodo in The Hunchback of Notre-Dame in 1978 at Joe Papp's Public Theater in New York. He appeared on and off Broadway and in regional theaters, doing the first American production of Simon Gray's The Common Pursuit, creating the role of Peter in the first two productions of Craig Lucas's Prelude to a Kiss, and doing the American premier of Alan Ayckbourn's A Small Family Business.

== Personal life ==
In 2009, he published a series of instructional books on American Kenpo Karate. A 5th Degree Black Belt, he presently teaches and writes at Arnott Kenpo in Pasadena, California.

Since opening, his dojo has been consistently ranked as the best martial arts dojo in Pasadena.

Arnott married Jane Carr in 1987 and the couple later divorced in 1995. He remarried in 2009 to Melissa Chase.
