= Kapālama =

Neighborhood in Honolulu, Hawaii, United States

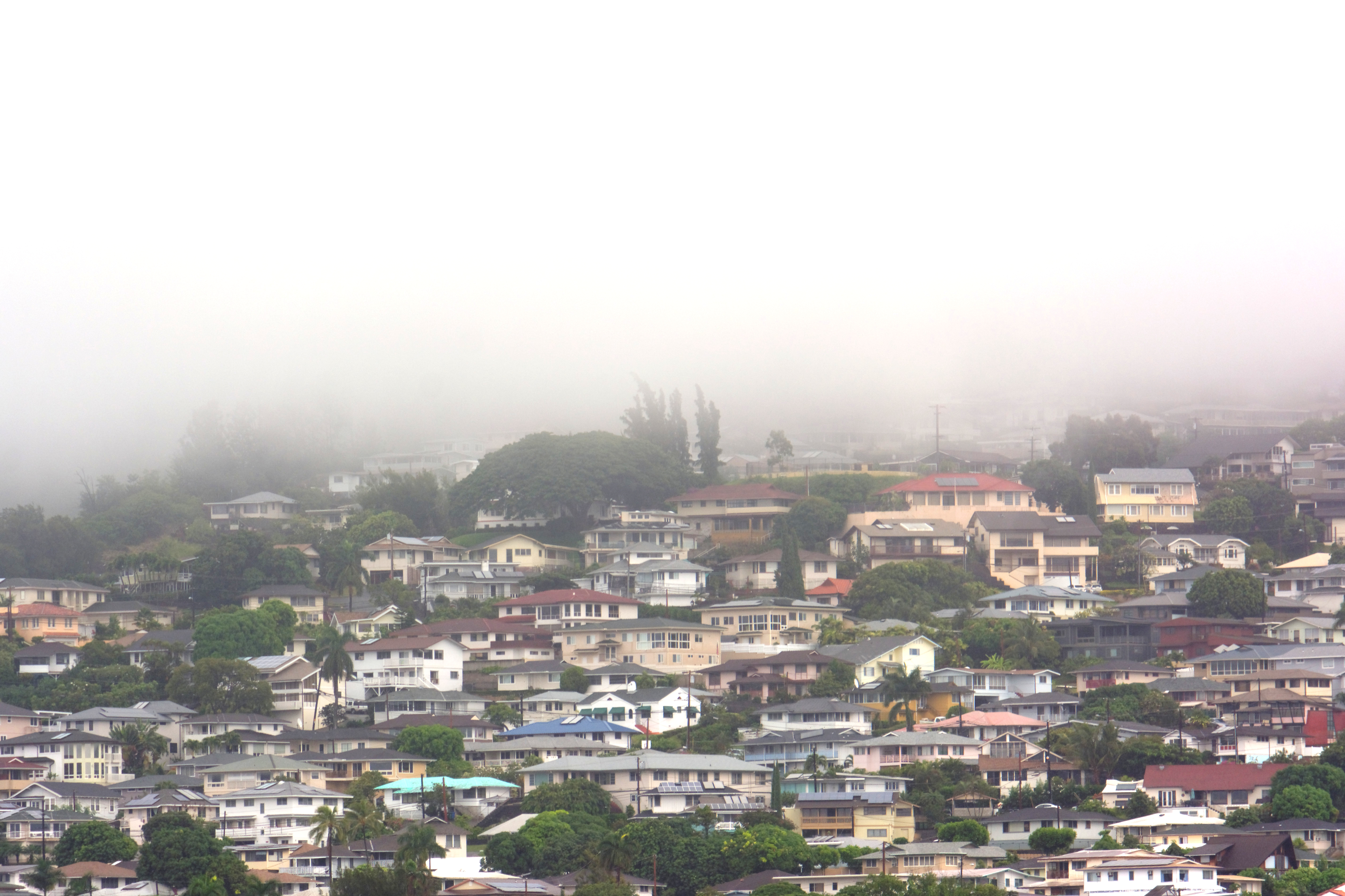
Clouds over Liliha-Kapalama

Kapālama, now often called Pālama, is a neighborhood of Honolulu, Hawaii. It is often combined with the adjacent Kalihi and referred to as a single entity, Kalihi–Pālama.

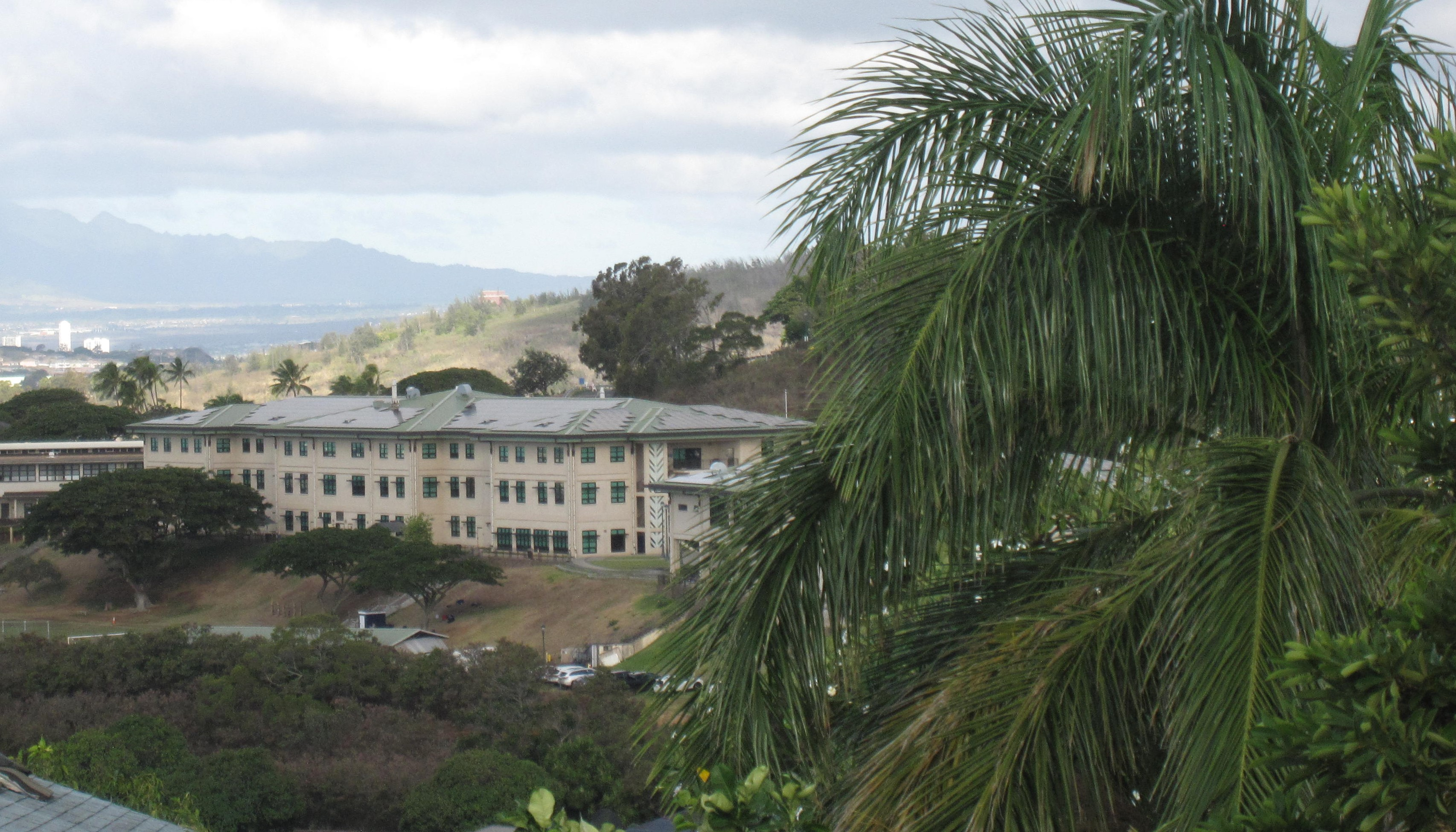
The Kamehameha School main campus is in Kapālama.

== History ==
The name comes from ka pā lama in the Hawaiian language which means "the enclosure of lama wood". "Lama" is the Hawaiian name for endemic ebony trees of genus Diospyros that were used in religious ceremonies.

Traditional land divisions (ahupuaʻa) in ancient Hawaii were agricultural units that ran from the seashore to mountains. The shoreline areas of Kapālama were later developed into part of Honolulu harbor. The upland areas of Kapālama developed into ‘Ālewa Heights, and the main campus of Kamehameha Schools. Other educational institutions range from Honolulu Community College to the Kapālama Elementary school. Palama Street at 21°19′24″N 157°51′53″W, and Kapālama Avenue at 21°20′5″N 157°51′58″W, are named for the neighborhood. The Kapālama Stream starts at 21°21′27″N 157°49′46″W and then runs into the Kapālama canal and basin. To the northwest is the neighborhood of Kalihi, and to the southeast downtown Honolulu.

The Kapalama Military Reservation, constructed for logistical support in World War II was scheduled to close. A museum has been proposed in a building that served as a morgue during the Vietnam War in the 1960s. The Palama fire station at 879 North King Street was added to the National Register of Historic Places listings in Oahu as site 76000661 April 21, 1976, along with other Fire Stations of Oahu. It was designed in 1901 by Oliver G. Traphagen.

The Kaumakapili Church was moved to 766 North King Street after the 1900 fire in Chinatown. It was originally established on April 1, 1838, as a Protestant church for common people, to supplement the Kawaiahao Church which was generally intended for nobility. From 1881 to 1888 a new brick and wood-frame structure was built. Temporary services were held until the new structure was built. Ground was broken on May 7, 1910, and the new building dedicated on June 25, 1911. It is located at the southern end of Palama Street at 21°19′17″N 157°51′59″W After much damage through the years, members raised US$2.4 million for a renovation starting in 1993 of the Gothic Revival architecture building.

Peter Cushman Jones established a Palama Chapel in the area in 1896. After the 1900 fire, James Arthur and Ragna Helsher Rath added social services to the center and called it Palama Settlement. The center, located at 810 North Vineyard Boulevard at Palama Street 21°19′24″N 157°51′51″W continues to offer community recreation and educational programs. The martial art of Kajukenbo was developed at the Palama Settlement.
