= G. D. Baum =

American writer

- Education: Sarah Lawrence
- Writing career
- Language: English
- Genre: Detective fiction
- Website: gdbaum.wordpress.com

G. D. Baum is an American crime novelist whose detective thrillers are set in Northern New Jersey. His novels feature detective Lock Tourmaline who is skilled in a hybrid form of Okinawan karate and Chinese Shaolin Kung Fu which combines striking, kicking, seizing, and grappling, called Shaolin Kempo Karate. Reviewers describe Baum's novels as having "carefully choreographed martial arts moves" and compare his "clean and breezy" style to that of Dashiell Hammett and Raymond Chandler, One critic suggested there was "too much dialogue", but another suggested it was "rapid-fire" and "real-life".

== Books ==
- Point and Shoot, G. D. Baum, ISBN 1-4196-1981-0, 2006, revised edition 2015
- Sleeping to Death, G. D. Baum, ISBN 9781494744328, 2015
