= Sam Aiona =

American politician based in Hawaii

Member of the Hawaii House of Representatives from the 24th district
- In office November 1996 – November 1998
- Preceded by: Jim Shon
- Succeeded by: Brian Schatz

Personal details
- Born: August 19, 1965 (age 60) Hilo, Hawaii
- Party: Republican

Samson K. Aiona (born August 19, 1965) is a businessman and politician in Hawaii who served as a state representative from 1996 to 1998. He also served as a party leader and leading a government social service agency.

He was born in Hilo. He was a candidate to unseat Democrat Jim Shon and was supported by Patricia Saiki and Franklin Kometani. He served as chair of Hawaii's Republican Party.

He currently serves as executive director of Palama Settlement.
