= William Kwai-sun Chow =

American martial artist

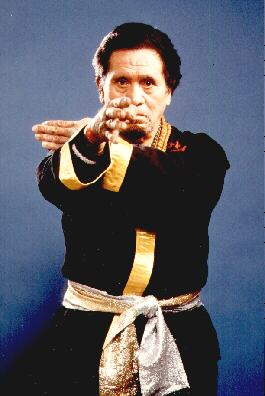
- Born: William Ah Sun Chow-Hoon; July 3, 1914; Honolulu, Oahu, Territory of Hawaii
- Died: September 21, 1987 (aged 73); Honolulu, Oahu, Hawaii, United States
- Other names: Ah Sun Chow-Hoon
- Style: Kara-Ho Kempo, Kenpo, Boxing, Wrestling, Jujutsu, Karate, Hung Ga
- Teacher: James Mitose
- Rank: 10th Degree Black Belt in Kara-Ho Kempo

Other information
- Notable students: Edmund Parker, Bobby Lowe, Adriano Directo Emperado (founder of Kajukenbo)

William Kwai-sun Chow (July 3, 1914 – September 21, 1987, AKA William Ah Sun Chow-Hoon) was instrumental in the development of the martial arts in the United States, specifically the family of styles referred to as kenpo/kempo.

Born in Honolulu, but raised in Hana, Hawaii, Chow was the third of sixteen children and the first son born to Chow Hoon (AKA Ah Hoon-Chow) and Rose Kalamalio Naehu. Chow's father came to Hawaii at the age of 18 and worked in a laundromat as a laborer. His mother was of Hawaiian descent. One of his brothers, John Chow-Hoon, would also become a well–known martial artist. Chow left school at age eleven when he was in the sixth grade.

== Training and lineage ==
Chow was exposed to several types of martial arts as a young man. These styles most likely included boxing, chinese boxing, wrestling, jujutsu, and karate. Though he stood no more than 5’2” tall, he was well known for his powerful breaking techniques. Chow eventually studied “Kenpo Jiujutsu” or “Kosho Ryu Kenpo” under the direction of James Mitose. As he progressed he often tested his prowess against US military personnel in street fights. In spite of this, it was never recorded that Chow ran afoul of the law.

William Chow became one of five people awarded black belts under Mitose. Chow's black belt certificate was signed by Thomas Young. Young was Mitose's senior student and instructor.

== Instruction style ==
Chow had a reputation for being a tough instructor, although this quote from Nick Cerio seems to indicate that the intent was to train, not to harm:

I got banged here and there with the old man, but not in a malicious way, Chow was tough and gave you a good strong workout. He was adamant about physical conditioning and when he did a technique, he meant business. I believe he didn’t have the intention of hurting you. It was just that he was so powerful and quick that he didn’t realize himself how much damage he did when he demonstrated a technique on you.

== Influence ==
=== Kenpo Karate ===
In 1944 Chow began teaching what he called “Kenpo Karate” at the Nuuanu YMCA in Honolulu. As Mitose had referred to his art as "kenpo jujitsu," rather than "kenpo karate," this was a departure for Chow. His many students included Ed Parker, Joseph D. and Adriano D. Emperado, Ron Alo, Abe KAMAHOAHOA, Bobby Lowe, Ralph Castro, Anthony S.Agisa, Sam Kuoha, Matias Ulangca Jr, Bill Chun Sr., John Leone, William G. (Billy) Marciarelli (Kachi/Kenpo), Walter K. Liu, and Paul Pung. He did not create or perform any kata but focused more on individual techniques.

=== Spread of Kenpo Karate ===
William Chow's legacy grew as kenpo spread to the United States mainland with the introduction of American Kenpo by his student Ed Parker and the work of other students such as Ralph Castro (Shaolin Kenpo) and Adriano Emperado (Kajukenbo, Karazenpo go shinjutsu). Later, his student Sonny Gascon, Gascon's student George Pesare (founder of the East Coast branch of Karazenpo/Kempo), Pesare's student Nick Cerio, and Anthony S. Agisa (founder of Goshin Kenpo Ka Ju) were instrumental in bringing kenpo to students in the eastern United States. Ron Alo, another student, was one of the first practitioners to bring Kara-Ho Kempo to the mainland, where he taught Chow's art in Southern California before developing his own Alo Kenpo system.

=== Warrior ethos ===
In spite of his heavy influence on the martial arts in the United States and his many notable students, Chow never had a dojo of his own, often teaching in the park. He is thought to have lived in near poverty for much of his life. Nick Cerio once stated that "He was a very cautious individual who had no business sense whatsoever." Chow referred to his style as a “War Art” and focused largely on techniques that he felt worked in the streets.

== Death ==
Shortly before his death in 1987, Chow renamed his system Kara-Ho Kempo. Chow died of a cardio-ventricular accident due to hypertension.

== Sources ==
- Corcoran, John, Emil Farkas, Martial Arts Traditions, History, People, W.H. Smith, 1981. LCCN 82-11940
- Breen, Andrew. "Professor Nick Cerio, Evolution Of A Kenpo Master" Inside Kung Fu, July 1997: 40-45, 102-103
- Liedke, Bob (October 1989). "Nick Cerio, Kenpo's Forgotten Leader". Inside Kung Fu.

== See also ==
- American Kenpo
- List of Chinese Americans
- Chinese Hawaiians
