= Return of the Secaucus 7 =

1980 film directed by John Sayles

- Theatrical release poster by Monte Dolack
- Directed by: John Sayles
- Screenplay by: John Sayles
- Produced by: Jeffrey Nelson; William Aydelott
- Starring: Bruce MacDonald; Maggie Renzi; David Strathairn; Adam LeFevre; Maggie Cousineau
- Cinematography: Austin De Besche
- Edited by: John Sayles
- Music by: Mason Daring
- Production company: Salsipuedes Productions
- Distributed by: Libra Films
- Release date: September 5, 1980 (United States)
- Running time: 110 minutes
- Country: United States
- Language: English
- Budget: $60,000 (estimated)
- Box office: $2 million

Return of the Secaucus 7 is a 1980 American independent drama film written and directed by John Sayles and starring Bruce MacDonald, Maggie Renzi, David Strathairn, Adam LeFevre, Maggie Cousineau, Gordon Clapp, and Jean Passanante, and others. The film tells the story of seven friends who spend a weekend together in New Hampshire. The weekend is marred by the break-up of a relationship between two of the friends. This causes a ripple effect among the group and brings up old desires and problems.

The picture was thought to have inspired The Big Chill (1983), which is a more widely known film with a similar storyline. However, writer-director Lawrence Kasdan has denied having seen Return of the Secaucus 7 before working on The Big Chill. In 1997, the film was selected for preservation in the National Film Registry of the Library of Congress for its historic merits.

== Plot ==
Teachers Mike Donnelly (MacDonald) and Katie Sipriano (Renzi) prepare to host a gathering of their old college activist friends at their rural New Hampshire home. Frances (Cousineau), now in medical school, drives in with her old boyfriend, wannabe folk singer J.T. (LeFevre), who she found hitchhiking to the gathering. Irene (Passanante), a speechwriter for a Democratic U.S. senator, arrives with her conservative boyfriend, Chip (Clapp), who did not attend college with the others. Maura (Trott) says that she and Jeff (Arnott) are no longer a couple, which shocks the others and causes a somewhat uneasy first evening. Maura and J.T. are mutually attracted and have sex that night while Frances is nearby. The group attends a play that their old friend, Lacey, is acting in. Katie heckles Lacey, annoying Mike.

Jeff arrives and is apparently unaware that Maura has ended their relationship. This further strains the group's cohesion, especially when J.T. tells Jeff he had sex with Maura, believing she was single. Jeff acknowledges being angry at J.T., but it does not end their friendship. After playing basketball and skinny-dipping with Mike's high school friends, Ron (Strathairn) and Howie (Sayles), the group goes to a bar. Jeff and Maura get into a loud argument and Ron makes a pass at Frances, who is upset that J.T. and Maura were intimate. Ron and Frances leave for a local hotel, while Maura leaves by herself, and the rest of the group drives separately. Out on the road, the group come upon a deer carcass. An undercover cop arrests them on suspicion of illegal game hunting. While sitting in lock-up, the group recounts their various arrests during their college years and the formation of their nickname, the "Secaucus 7". A local drunk confesses to hitting the deer, and everyone is released. The following day, the group leaves one-by-one, and J.T. insists on hitchhiking to Boston, refusing money from Maura for a bus ticket. Jeff is left alone, and angrily chops wood on Mike's property. The film ends with Mike and Katie finding a farewell note from Jeff reading, "I'm sorry. --Jeff".

== Cast ==
- Bruce MacDonald as Mike Donnelly
- Maggie Renzi as Katie Sipriano
- Adam LeFevre as J.T.
- Maggie Cousineau as Frances Carlson
- Gordon Clapp as Chip Hollister
- Jean Passanante as Irene Rosenblum
- Karen Trott as Maura Tolliver
- Mark Arnott as Jeff Andrews
- David Strathairn as Ron Desjardins
- John Sayles as Howie
- Marisa Smith as Carol
- Amy Schewel as Lacey Summers
- Carolyn Brooks as Meg
- Eric Forsythe as Captain
- Nancy Mette as Lee

== Production ==
John Sayles had established a strong reputation as a screenwriter in exploitation films for Roger Corman, his credits including Piranha, The Lady in Red and Battle Beyond the Stars. Sayles wanted to direct and used his script fees to finance Secaucus Seven. Roger Corman offered to assist Sayles with finance but the writer-director refused. "I actually didn’t need a producer to come in at that point,” said Sayles, adding, “It was very generous of him."

Sayles had written the script in the late seventies. He said the story was not autobiographical but "about people that I met after I was out of college who were in some ways more politically involved than I was or more politically aware than I was who were trying to keep their idealism together. They were trying to stay optimistic. But it was a community, even though they didn’t live together anymore." He said he was partly motivated to write the script to demonstrate that some people still tried to live up to the ideals of the sixties.

The movie was shot over 25 days starring people with whom Sayles had worked in summer stock theatre as an actor and director.

== Reception ==
=== Critical response ===
Film critic Emanuel Levy liked the film and wrote, "The movie became influential, launching a cycle of "reunion" films, which included The Big Chill and the TV series Thirtysomething. As a portrait of disenchantment, Return was more authentic and honest than Lawrence Kasdan's star-studded Big Chill...A rueful movie about unexceptional lives that have prematurely grown stale, Secaucus is a bit commonplace, lacking genuine drama. But Sayles uses effectively a discursive, episodic format; he constructs strong scenes with resonant dialogue. The characters are complex and individually distinguished by speech, gesture, and manner."

Critic Frederic and Mary Ann Brussat wrote, "Here's a nice little movie about the baby boom generation...Novelist John Sayles wrote, directed, and edited this movie. It is a labor of love. We watch these laidback individuals share their stories and reminisce about the past...But these baby boomers can't handle tension; the rift between Jeff and Maura sends tremors through the weekend. And although they put up a front of having a good time, one senses that things haven't turned out well for them — either in terms of meaningful relationships or in terms of personal fulfillment. Return of the Secaucus Seven leaves one with a rueful feeling about this generation."

The review aggregator Rotten Tomatoes reported that 81% of critics gave the film a positive review, based on sixteen reviews.

Film critic Aljean Harmetz of The New York Times wrote in her review: "For a movie that cost $60,000, The Return of the Secaucus Seven is traveling in heady company. Most $60,000 movies play at two film festivals, then end up on a 16-millimeter projector in their director's living room. The Return of the Secaucus Seven, about seven antiwar activists who spend a weekend together 10 years later, was the surprise hit of last spring's Los Angeles Filmex festival. The movie was also selected as one of the 10 best films of 1980 by The Boston Globe, The Los Angeles Times and Time magazine, and last week it was nominated by the Writers Guild as best comedy written directly for the screen. When it opened an unsuccessful commercial run in New York last September, Vincent Canby, although expressing some reservations, praised the film as sweet and engaging and an honest, fully realized movie. Today it will try again, opening at the Quad in Greenwich Village this time."

=== Release ===
Return of the Secaucus 7 was released in United States theatres on September 5, 1980.

The film was first released for home entertainment by RCA/Columbia (VHS) and Columbia Pictures Home Entertainment (Betamax) in 1982.

It was released on DVD by MGM Home Entertainment on September 16, 2003.

=== Accolades ===
Wins

- Los Angeles Film Critics Association Awards: LAFCA Award; Best Screenplay, John Sayles; 1980.
- Boston Society of Film Critics Awards: BSFC Award; Best Independent Film; 1981.

Nominations

- Writers Guild of America, East: WGA Award (Screen); Best Comedy Written Directly for the Screen, John Sayles; 1981.

Other distinctions

- In 1997, the film was selected for preservation in the United States National Film Registry by the Library of Congress as being "culturally, historically, or aesthetically significant".

== The Big Chill ==
The film was followed by the 1983 movie The Big Chill which had some story similarities with Return of the Secaucus 7. Sayles recalled his film's title:

Has some idea of rebirth or comeback. The Big Chill was called The Big Chill because it’s about people who have lost their idealism or never had it in the first place, and that’s a cold realization. The people in The Big Chill tend to be more upper-middle class rather than middle class or working class, and they’re all upwardly mobile—whereas the people in Secaucus Seven, the men especially, are consciously downwardly mobile. If the women are upwardly mobile, they’re probably having a career that their mothers didn’t. Even though the form of the two movies and the plot in some ways are very close, they’re really about very different people, which is why I never felt like it was a rip-off.

== Notes ==
- Sayles, John (1998). Sayles on Sayles. Faber and Faber.
