= Simeone George Pesare =

George Pesare
- Born: Simeone George Pesare; February 18, 1939 (United States) Providence, Rhode Island
- Died: October 14, 2012; Providence, RI cancer
- Nationality: (United States) American
- Style: Kenpo/Kempo
- Teachers: Victor “Sonny” Gascon, Joe Blacquerra, Bill Ryusaki, Jack Hwang
- Rank: 10th dan black belt Karazenpo Go Shinjutsu; 5th dan black belt in Judo; 4th dan black belt in Taekwondo; 4th dan black belt in Eskrima; 2nd dan black belt in Aikido

Other information
- Notable students: Nick Cerio, Jean-Guy Angell

Simeone George Pesare (February 18, 1939 – October 14, 2012) was an American martial artist born in Providence, Rhode Island. He was a 10th-degree black belt (awarded by Victor Gascon) and had high-degree black belts in additional martial arts including judo, taewkondo, eskrima, and aikido. Pesare was a successful karate and judo competitor. He was a member of the New England Black Belt Hall of Fame.

Overcoming a childhood spent in and out of Rhode Island's reform schools, Pesare entered the military and emerged with training as a jet mechanic and an interest in martial arts. In 1958 he moved to California, where he met Victor “Sonny” Gascon, a founder of Karazenpo Go Shinjutsu and trained with his student Joe Blacquerra.

== Bringing Kenpo to New England and students ==
Pesare returned to Rhode Island in 1962 and in that same year opened the first Kenpo Karate school in New England. Known for grueling training and three-day-long black belt tests, Pesare soon gained a reputation and attracted many students. Among the few who completed his demanding curriculum were the influential martial artists Roger Carpenter, Nick Cerio, Linda Herzog, Armen Garo, Dr. Gilman Whiting, Marc Ayotte, Kurtis Parisi, Steve Nugent, and Donna L. Vinbury, the first woman to obtain a 10th –degree black belt in kenpo. Although he did not grant their original black belts, Pesare trained and awarded high-degree black belts to well known martial artists Cecil Andrews II, Stephen A. Lombardi, Christine Bannon-Rodrigues, Don Rodrigues, Mark Sheeley, and Kathy and Joe Shuras.

Pesare was the founder and long-time head of the International Kenpo Council of Grandmasters, which has the goal of preserving traditional Kenpo training and documenting its lineage.

Senior Grand Master S. George Pesare died on October 14, 2012. His school, George Pesare's Kaito Gakko (School of Schools) in Providence, RI., continues to operate as the "Kenpo Karate Institute" a namesake for the original school and operated by senior Black Belts Dolores Bastone, Hubert Paquette, Marc Ayotte, and Michael Mullen.

== Marksmanship ==
George Pesare was a long-time law enforcement officer working with Rhode Island Sheriff's offices. An expert marksman, he was the 1994 Rhode Island State Police Pistol Champion and coordinator of the National Rifle Associations' Annual Police Pistol Regional Championships. Pesare was also the President and Rhode Island Match Director of the Rhode Island Police Pistol Combat League.
