= Palama Settlement =

Nonprofit social service agency

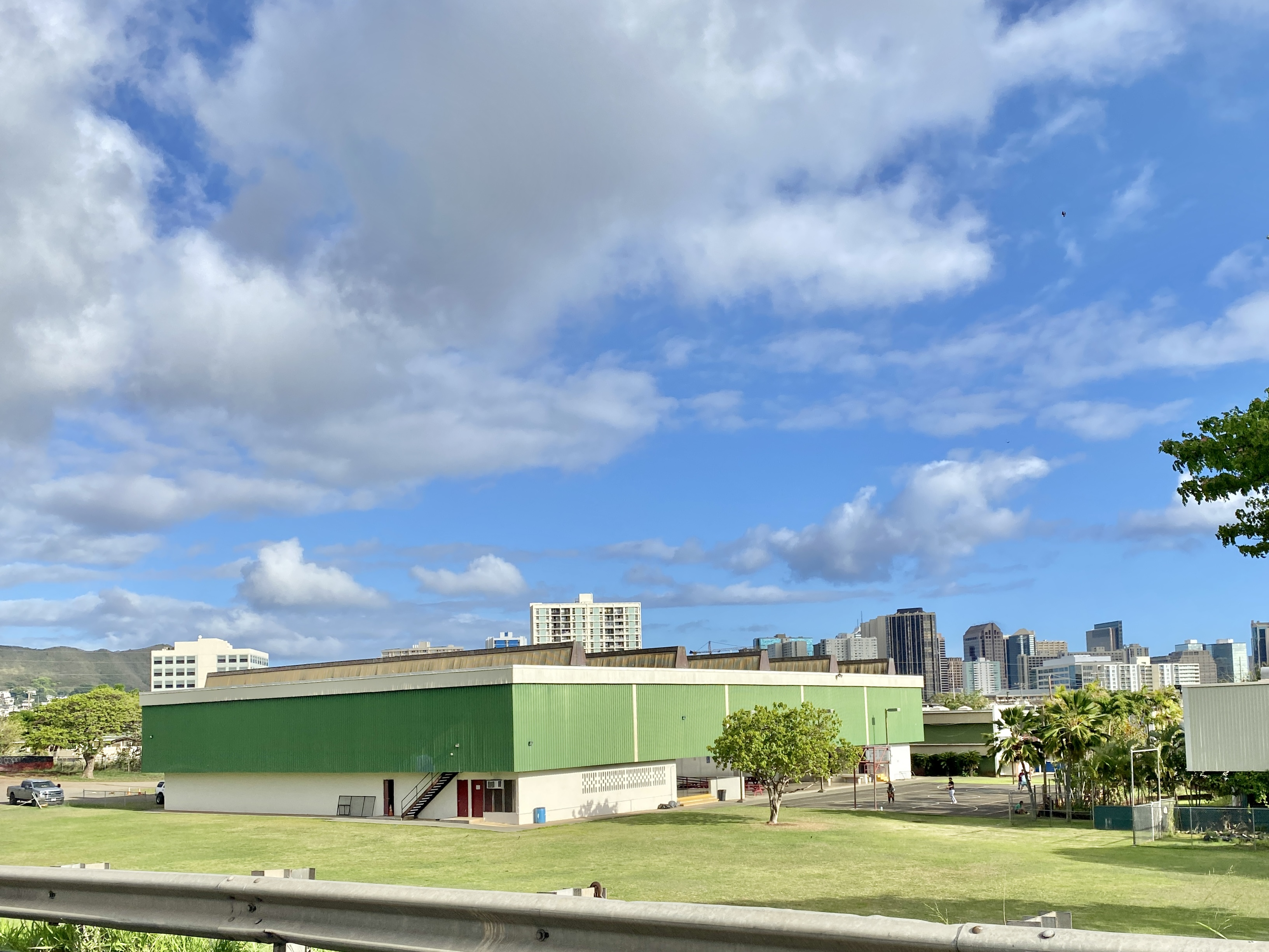
- Palama Settlement in 2022
- Formation: 1896
- Headquarters: Honolulu, Hawaii
- Services: Community services, wellness, recreation
- Executive director: Sam Aiona
- Website: https://palamasettlement.org

Palama Settlement is a nonprofit social service agency located in Honolulu, Hawaii that was established in 1896. It currently serves the Kalihi and Kāpalama neighborhoods of Honolulu.

== History ==
Peter Cushman Jones established Palama Chapel in 1896. After the 1900 Chinatown fire, which left thousands of residents homeless and relocated to tenements in Palama, James Arthur and Ragna Helsher Rath added social services to the center and called it Palama Settlement. The center continues to offer community recreation and educational programs.

In September 1941, Palama Settlement hosted future baseball star Jackie Robinson when he was playing professional football for the Honolulu Bears, as he was not allowed to stay at regular hotels with his white teammates.

At Palama Settlement, the school that would become the first Kajukenbo school was made.
