= Kajukenbo =

Hybrid American Martial Art

- Focus: Mixed
- Country of origin: Territory of Hawaii
- Creator: Original Kajukenbo: Adriano Emperado, Peter Young Yil Choo, Joe Holck, Frank Ordonez and Clarence Chang
- Famous practitioners: Sage Northcutt, Chuck Liddell, Don Stroud, Glover Teixeira
- Parenthood: Kara-Ho Kempo, Danzan-ryu Jujutsu, judo, Tang Soo Do, karate, boxing, chin na, Ng Ying Kung Fu, arnis

Kajukenbo (Japanese: カジュケンボ) is a mixed martial art from Hawaii. It was developed in the late 1940s and founded in 1947 in the Palama Settlement on Oahu, Territory of Hawaii.

Kajukenbo training incorporates a blend of striking, kicking, throwing, takedowns, joint locks and weapon disarmament.

Today, Kajukenbo is practiced all over the world in many different branches. In contrast to many traditional martial arts, students are not required to mimic their teacher, but are encouraged to develop their own "expression" of the art after they first master the system.

== Etymology ==
The name Kajukenbo is a combination of the various arts from which its style is derived. The name of the system has been derived from the beginnings of the names of the styles that had become components of kajukenbo:

- KA from Japanese and Korean Karate
- JU from Japanese Judo and Jujutsu/Brazilian Jiu-Jitsu.
- KEN from Kenpo and/or the Japanese word for Fist.
- BO from Western Boxing and Chinese Boxing.

== History ==
=== 1945-1959 ===
In the late 1940s, the Palama Settlement was a violent area. Because of this environment, five martial artists from varying backgrounds, initially known as the "Black Belt Society", came together with the goal of developing an art that would be practical and effective on the street. These founders sought to develop one style that would complement each of their individual styles and yet allow for effective fighting at a greater variety of ranges and speeds.

The five founding members of Kajukenbo were:

- Adriano D. Emperado — Kosho Shorei-Ryū Kenpo, Arnis and Ng Ying Kung Fu
- Joseph Holck — Kodokan Judo
- Peter Young Yil Choo — Tang Soo Do (Moo Duk Kwan), Boxing, and Karate
- Frank F. Ordonez — Sekeino Jujutsu
- Clarence Chang — Sil-Lum Pai Gongfu (Ng Ying Kung Fu and Chin Na)

Of the five, Adriano Directo Emperado is often attributed to be the founder. In its conception, the founders followed a simple rule: if a technique worked consistently on the street (or against one another), then it stayed in the system; if it did not, it was discarded. This allowed the style to maintain its self-defense focus, while covering limitations found within each of their traditional arts.

For two years (1945-1947) these five teachers put their knowledge into practice, rehearsing every day possible situations of aggression in real life. Furthermore, it was designed to exemplify the best aspects of American culture, such as courage, pragmatism and deep personal conviction, all the while maintaining the rich cultures of their individual Asian heritages. Later they decided to call this system kajukenbo (referring to the initials of the martial arts that compose it) and created the Black Belt Society.

Initially, the school that would become the first Kajukenbo school was run by Windel McCandels in Palama Settlement, Honolulu. After having studied under William Chow, Emperado had studied under McCandels. After McCandles had died, Emperado took control of the school and renamed it Palama Settlement Kajukenbo Self-Defenses Institute of Karate.

Shortly after its conception, the Korean War broke out, and with it Joe Holck, Peter Choo, Frank Ordonez, and Clarence Chang left Hawaii on active military service, leaving only Adriano Emperado to continue teaching the system. Although Adriano Emperado was the listed as the chief instructor of Kajukenbo Institute, most of the instruction was handled by his younger brother, Joseph "Joe" Emperado.

After the death of Joseph Emperado, the Kajukenbo Institute fell in chaos, causing 14 Black Belt-level instructors to leave the school after the week of his death. The Institute remained remaining inoperable for 3 months, until classes eventually restarted under the instruction of Joe Delacruz and Adriano Emperado.

In 1958, over time the teachings moved to the Pacific Coast of the United States, specifically to a student from the institute, Aleju Reyes, who opened the first school outside the Hawaiian Islands, at the Travis Air Force Base (in California). One of his students was Richard Peralta, who started kajukenbo in 1959. That same year, Adriano Emperado integrated wushu techniques into kajukenbo, turning his art into a fluid combination of hard and soft techniques.

=== After 1959 ===
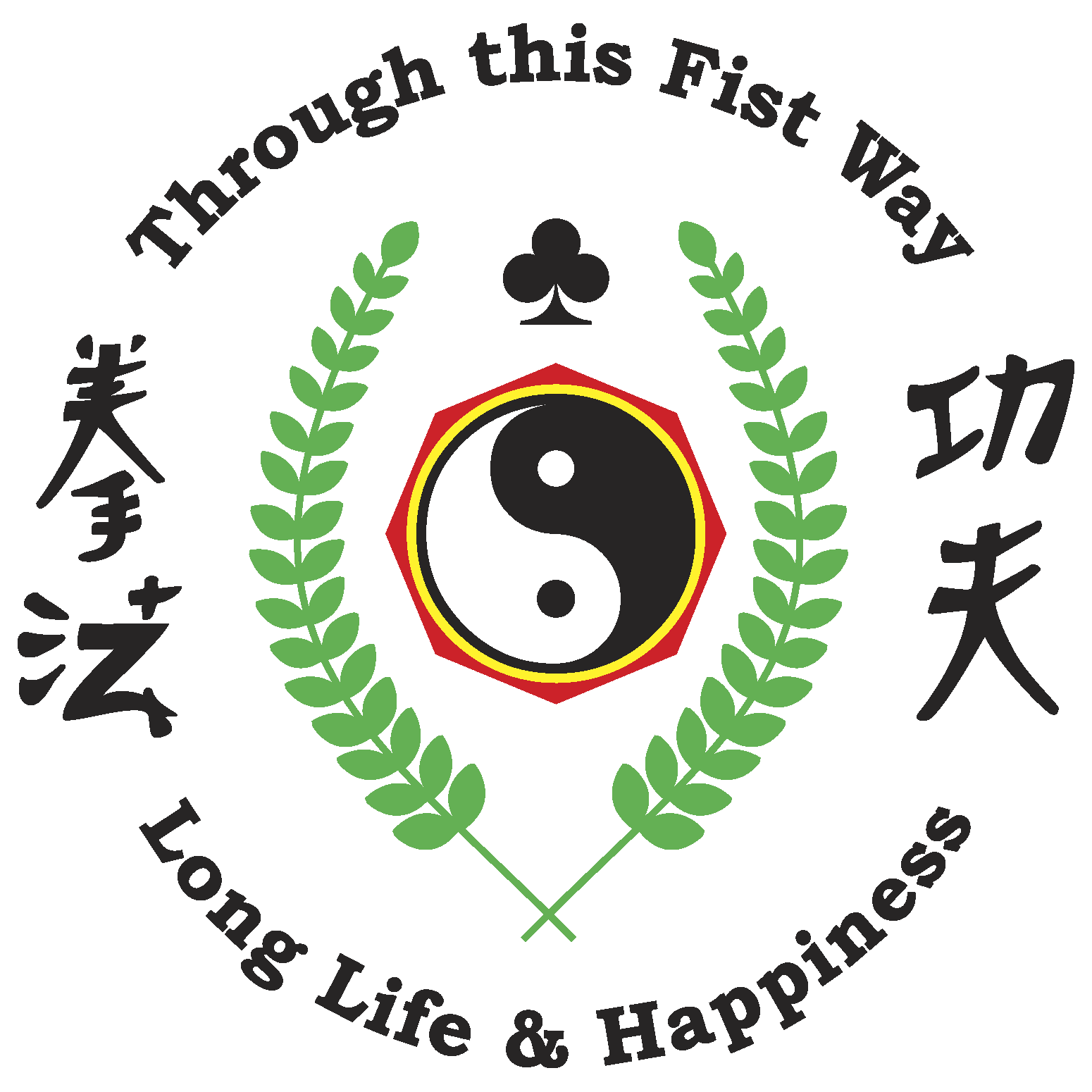
One example of a Kajukenbo crest

Charles Gaylord, Tony Ramos, and Aleju Reyes, who had received their black belts from Emperado, passed down kajukenbo in the United States. Each of them opened their own kajukenbo school in California. With first being Tony Ramos in 1960, and followed by Reyes, Gaylord, Joe Halbuna. In 1965 Al Dacascos would follow.

In 1967 Charles Gaylord, along with other accomplished Kajukenbo practitioners Aleju Reyes, Joe Halbuna, Tony Ramos, and Al Dacascos formed the Kajukenbo Association of America (KAA.)

=== Kajukenbo in present ===
Kajukenbo continues to evolve with each generation and maintains its primary focus on realism and practicality. There are usually martial arts schools that will change along with time to fit into the day's society. It is generally thought that "unfair" moves, such as strikes to the eyes or groin, are perfectly acceptable, as is whatever else the practitioner feels is necessary to get home that day.

Currently, Kajukenbo includes more grappling techniques and more throws than other Kenpo schools. The curriculum include different counterattacks against punches, knives, sticks, firearms and grappling.

Certain Kajukenbo schools direct attention to 26 fundamental forms ("Kata"). These Kata had been divided into 13 "Pinyans" and 13 "Concentrations". Each one has its own specific name: for example, the first one is called "crane strike/tiger's claw". The name of each "Concentration" describes its characteristic movement. So, the first concentration includes a crane strike and a tiger claw. These sequences are incorporated into Kajukenbo to enhance the student's skills. Each movement in these forms has its own meaning. For example, the first beat in "Pinyan 1" is a right outside strike that moves into the backbend position during the beat. This motion can be applied to block a blow with a punch. These sequences also focus on combat that faces more than one opponent.

== Features ==
Training workouts emphasize cardio conditioning and functional strength. While individual schools may show variation, it would not be unusual to train with sandbags or boxing gloves. There are core self-defense techniques at the heart of Kajukenbo and Kajukenbo schools discourages impractical and flashy moves. Most Kajukenbo curricula feature counter-attacks to punches, kicks, grabs, as well as using knives, sticks and guns to counter back. While this base of common knowledge will keep schools' styles similar, there is plenty of room for variation. This openness tends to encourage schools to incorporate other arts into their practice. The primary concentration of all Kajukenbo schools remains real world self-defense.

== Ranking ==
Traditional Belt Colors
White
Yellow
Orange
Purple
Blue
Green
Brown
Black

Ranking hierarchies vary widely from school to school.

Traditional Japanese martial art ranking is often followed. One common belt order is as follows: white, yellow, orange, purple, blue, green, brown, and black, followed by the other various degrees of the black belt. The schools have second and third stripe belts that feature a white for second or black for third stripe running down the center of the belt.

Black belt rankings and titles can also vary, with most schools adopting either Chinese or Japanese titles.

== Official branches ==
=== Original Method ===
Kajukenbo "Emperado Method" or "Traditional Hard Style".

=== Tum Pai ===
The original style of Tum Pai might have been put together by Adriano D. Emperado, Al Dacascos and Al Dela Cruz in the early 60s to create an advanced style for the Kajukenbo system. In the mid-60s the developments that made up Tum Pai became incorporated into what was called "Chu'an Fa". In 1971 Jon A. Loren started incorporating the concepts of tai chi and Southern Sil-lum into his Kajukenbo classes. This was called Northern Kajukenbo until 1976. In 1976, while staying with Emperado in Hawaii, he demonstrated his concepts and techniques and asked if he could call it Tum Pai and bring the name back to life. Emperado granted permission with the acknowledgment that the original Tum Pai followed a different path than the revised Tum Pai soft style. The name Tum Pai, which means "central way", fits the tai chi concept blended into the Kajukenbo format.

=== Chu'an Fa ===
In Hawaii during the early 1960s Adriano Emperado, along with students Al Dacascos and Al Dela Cruz, incorporated innovations of the style Tum Pai and other martial arts into their Kajukenbo training. Later it became obvious that they were no longer doing Tum Pai and it would have to be named something else. In the mid 60s Al Dacascos moved to Northern California and continued training in the Northern and Southern styles of Sil-lum Kung Fu to enhance his Kajukenbo training. It was in 1965 that the name Chu'an Fa was introduced.

=== Wun Hop Kuen Do ===
Wun Hop Kuen Do was founded by Al Dacascos, father of martial artist and actor Mark Dacascos, who also practises the art. In Cantonese Chinese Wun Hop Kuen Do means "combination fist art style". Wun Hop Kuen Do techniques identify with, and are based on, the Kajukenbo system.

== Associations and groups ==
=== Emperado's Kajukenbo Self Defense Institute Worldwide Inc. ===
Founded by Sijo Adriano Emperado, it exists as an umbrella aiming to bring all branches of Kajukenbo under Sijo's umbrella. The KSDI is currently under the administration of GM Kimo Emperado with deputy administrator GM Glen Fraticelli.

=== Kajukenbo Association of America ===
In 1967 Charles Gaylord, along with other Kajukenbo practitioners Aleju Reyes, Joe Halbuna, Tony Ramos, John Ramos and Al Dacascos formed the Kajukenbo Association of America (KAA.) The KAA organization lasted until the early 1970s, but it was brought back in 1980 under the leadership of Charles Gaylord. Fifteen years later in September 1995, the KAA's black belts promoted Charles Gaylord to the honorary rank of 10th degree black belt. Grandmaster Gaylord's traditional Kajukenbo curriculum continues to be taught by his chief instructors who operate Kajukenbo schools in Hawaii and other parts of the United States and the world, including countries like Japan.

=== World Wide Kajukenbo Federation ===
The World Wide Kajukenbo Federation is headed by Senior Grandmaster Hemenes, along with an executive board of Prof Alsarraf in Kuwait, Senior Grandmaster Robert New in Hawaii and Grandmaster Jimmy Willis in the USA. The World Wide Kajukenbo Federation is a form of Kajukenbo that claims to not just promote self defence and street combatives training, but that it has also produced champions in forms & points fighting and also trains MMA & Sanda competitors.

Hemenes' legitimacy has often been questioned, as his 8th degree promotion was given by someone with no more than an honorary Kajukenbo rank, and his 9th degree/grandmastership promotion was headed by a man who had been kicked out of Kajukenbo decades earlier due to alleged crimes.

== In popular fiction ==
The 1982 children's book A Bundle of Sticks, by Pat Rhoads Mauser, is the story of a fifth-grade boy Ben Tyler, who is being bullied by a much larger boy named Boyd Bradshaw. One day Ben comes home from school with a badly bruised nose, so Ben's parents decide to enroll him in a Kajukenbo martial arts school. Ben reluctantly agrees to attend the school because his mother has already paid the instructor who is known only as Sifu. At first Ben thinks he will not enjoy Kajukenbo, but he eventually discovers how valuable his training is when he successfully defends himself from Boyd.

== Bibliography ==
- Thomas A. Green (2001). Martial Arts of the World: An Encyclopedia. ABC-CLIO. pp. 219–224. ISBN 9781576071502.
- DeMarco, Michael (2020). Some Western Pioneers in Asian Martial Arts: An Anthology. Via Media Publishing. ISBN 9798554658143.
