= Reynaldo Graulty =

Filipino judge and legislator

Reynaldo Graulty is a judge and former state legislator in Hawaii. He is a Filipino American and Catholic.

He was born in the Philippines to an American father and Filipino mother. He has served in the Hawaii State House of Representatives and Hawaii Senate. He has served on the Hawaii Ethics Commission.
