= Adriano Directo Emperado =

American martial artist

- Born: June 15, 1926; Honolulu, Territory of Hawaii
- Died: April 5, 2009 (aged 82); Honolulu, Hawaii, United States
- Nationality: American
- Style: Kajukenbo
- Teacher: William Kwai Sun Chow
- Rank: 10th degree black belt in Kajukenbo

Other information
- Notable students: Victor "Sonny" Gascon

Adriano Directo Emperado (June 15, 1926 – April 4, 2009) was one of five martial artists who developed the kajukenbo self-defense system.

== Childhood and young adulthood ==
Emperado had a difficult childhood living in Honolulu. He was born to Filipino-Hawaiian parents in the poverty stricken Palama/Kalihi section of Honolulu. Like many poor areas, the Palama/Kalihi district settlement was a violent place to live. Confrontations and fights were a daily occurrence. Because of this Emperado started his self-defense training at the age of eight. His father and uncle were professional boxers and at the age of 11 he learned the 12 basic strikes of escrima. Then at the age of 14, he came back to his old familiar neighborhood in Palama. There he trained in Judo under Sensei Taneo at the Palama Settlement gym. Then at the age of 20, Emperado undertook serious study of Kenpo at the Catholic youth organization in Honolulu. These classes were taught by William K.S. Chow. Emperado trained daily with Chow and soon attained his first black belt. He would later be promoted to fifth-degree black belt by Chow.

== Later life ==
In 1947, Adriano Emperado (Kosho Shorei-ryu Kenpo and Escrima), Peter Young Yil Choo (Tang Soo Do, Karate, and Boxing), Joseph Holck (Sekeino-ryu Judo), Frank F. Ordonez (Danzan-ryu Jujutsu), and George "Clarence" Chuen Yoke Chang (Chu'an Fa Kung-Fu), came together and called themselves the Black Belt Society. They began training together and exploring the weaknesses and developing the strengths of each martial art to create a fighting style that did not suit the ancient warrior but the American citizen to help him or her in their fight against the common criminal.

Adriano’s Escrima training - while living on Kauai with his older brother, he trained in Escrima (learned a basic 12 strikes) and after returning to Oahu he continued his Escrima training with Isaac, Alexandro and Alfredo Peralta - (his stepfather)

Paralta taught him a Solo Baston System, a mix of Ilocano, Visayan and Tagalog Styles.

== Schools ==
Shortly after conception of Kajukenbo, the Korean War broke out, and with it Joe Holck, Peter Choo, Frank Ordonez, and Clarence Chang left Hawaii on active military service, leaving only Adriano Emperado to continue teaching the system. Although Adriano Emperado was the listed as the chief instructor of Kajukenbo Institute, most of the instruction was handled by his younger brother, Joseph "Joe" Emperado.

Initially, the school that would become the first Kajukenbo school was run by Windel McCandels in Palama Settlement, Honolulu. After having studied under William Chow, Emperado had studied under McCandels. After McCandles had died, Emperado took control of the school and renamed it Palama Settlement Kajukenbo Self-Defenses Institute of Karate.

Many of the students who trained there were poor, so at the Palama school students could train for $2.00 a month. The workouts that took place there were considered viscous for their brutality. Kajukenbo train in order to remain strong. In order to be invincible on the streets they had reasonable, but very serious, full contact training.

After the death of Joseph Emperado (knifed outside the school), the Kajukenbo Institute fell in chaos, causing 14 Black Belt-level instructors to leave the school after the week of his death. The Institute remained remaining inoperable for 3 months, until classes eventually restarted under the instruction of Joe Delacruz and Adriano Emperado.

Emperado would continue to experiment, creating a system named Tum Pai. In early 1960s, Adriano Emperado, along with students Al Dacascos and Al Dela Cruz, incorporated innovations of the style Tum Pai and other martial arts into their Kajukenbo training. Later it became obvious that they were no longer doing Tum Pai nor Kajukenbo, and it would have to be named something else. In the mid 60s Al Dacascos moved to Northern California and continued training in the Northern and Southern styles of Sil-lum Kung Fu to enhance his Kajukenbo training. It was in 1965 that the name Chu'an Fa was introduced.

Emperado died on April 4, 2009.

== Bibliography ==
- Thomas A. Green (2001). Martial Arts of the World: An Encyclopedia. ABC-CLIO. pp. 219–224. ISBN 9781576071502.
- DeMarco, Michael (2020). Some Western Pioneers in Asian Martial Arts: An Anthology. Via Media Publishing. ISBN 9798554658143.
