= American Kenpo Karate =

American Martial arts derived from Karate

American Kenpo
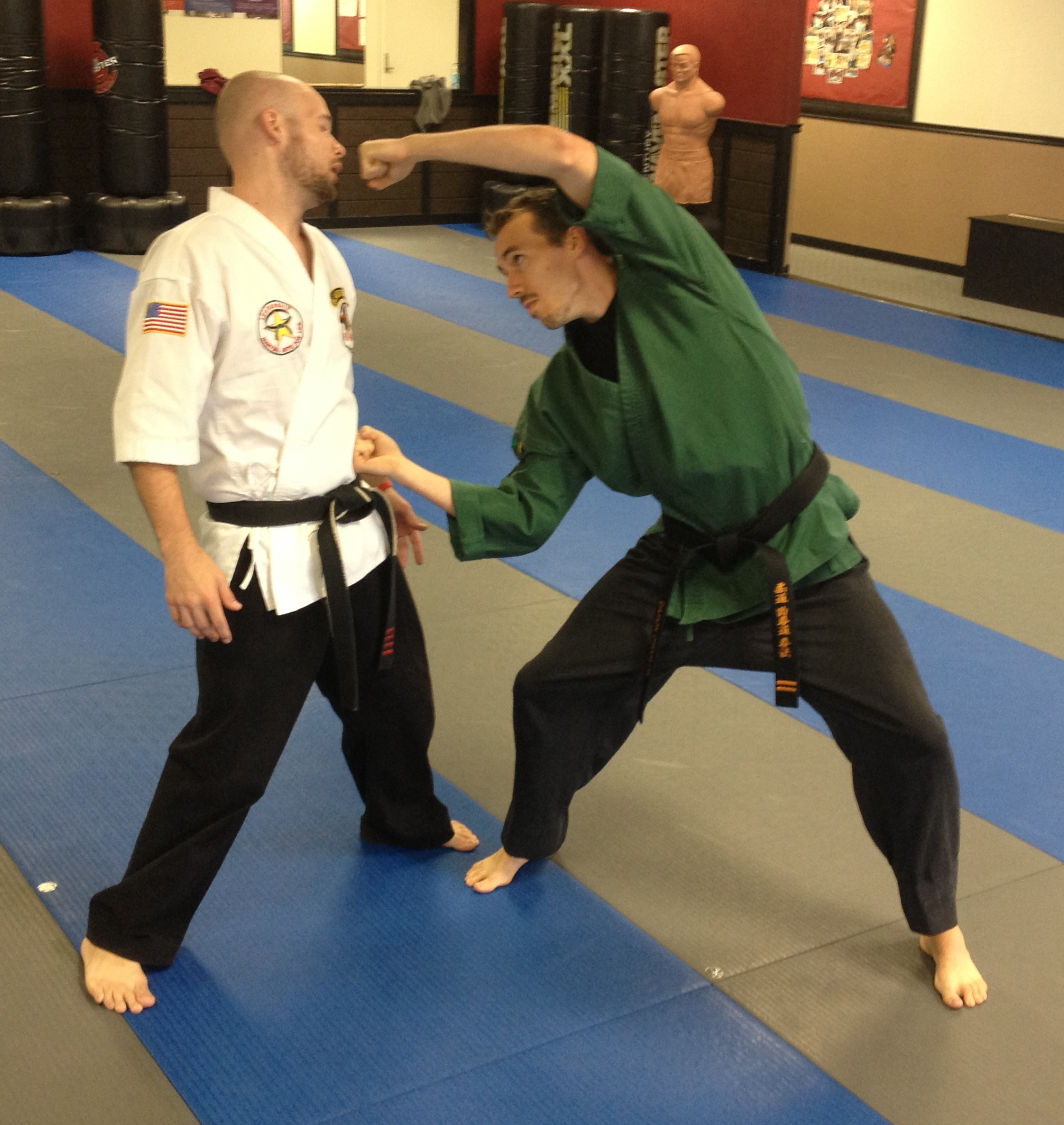
- Also known as: Kenpo Karate, Ed Parker Kenpo, Ed Parker Kenpo Karate, American-style Karate
- Focus: Hybrid
- Country of origin: United States
- Creator: Ed Parker
- Famous practitioners: Travis Fulton; Ed Parker Jr.; Benny Urquidez; Forest Whitaker; Elvis Presley; Christian Slater; Dick Dale; Joe Hyams; Mark Arnott; Jeff Speakman; Stephen Thompson; Thomas Ian Griffith; William Shatner
- Parenthood: Kosho Shorei Ryu Kenpo, Kara-Ho Kenpo, Boxing, Judo
- Descendant arts: Tracy Kenpo, American OkinawaTe
- Olympic sport: No
- Official website: International Kenpo Karate Association

American Kenpo Karate (/ˈkɛnpoʊ/; also known as American Kenpo or Ed Parker's Kenpo Karate) is an American hybrid martial art founded and codified by Ed Parker. It is synthesized mainly from Japanese and Okinawan martial arts such as karate and judo, with influence from Chinese martial arts. It is a form and descendant of Kenpō.

== Etymology ==
The word Kenpō (or Kempo) is an English transliteration of a Ryukyuan and Japanese pronunciation of Chinese characters 拳法. In Chinese, these characters are read as Kuen Fat (Cantonese) or Quánfǎ (Mandarin). In either language, the literal meaning of the term is 'fist method' or 'pugilism'. It is a term synonymous with Chinese martial arts. In martial arts such as American Kenpo and Shorinji Kempo, the term 'Kenpo' is therefore used to imply a historical and technical connection to Chinese Martial Arts.

== History ==
=== Early history ===
American Kenpo evolved from Chinese and Japanese roots. One predecessor, the martial art of kuen fat, came to America with Cantonese immigrants through the creation of Tongs. Kuen fat was refined by the Southern Chinese and spread into Fujian and Canton; later, various styles developed in Taiwan, Hong Kong, Ryukyu (Okinawa), Korea, Malaysia, Indonesia, Vietnam, and Japan.

The de facto modern history of American Kenpo began in 1933 when Thomas Miyashiro began openly teaching Kenpo in Hawaii alongside Mizuho Mutsu and Kamesuke Higashiona, students of Choki Motobu. They toured Hawaii, publicly demonstrating Kenpo in support of the state's first public Kenpo dojo. They were featured in numerous local newspapers and increased the sport's popularity in Hawaii. They also used books by Mizuho Mutsu and Choki Motobu, the most detailed books on Kenpo of their time. Another Japanese-American martial artist, James Mitose, began teaching the art in 1936 and started a formal Kenpo school in Hawaii in 1941.

Simultaneously, the Chee Kong Tong in Maui had been teaching Cantonese Kuen Fat to Cantonese immigrants since the 1920s. Sun Chow Hoon emigrated from Canton and trained in kuen fat at the Tong HQ when he first arrived in Maui. He also taught his eldest son, William Chow, who became an enforcer for the Tong. William Chow studied multiple martial arts in Hawaii, including Kenpo with James Mitose and Danzan Ryu Jujutsu with his brother John Chow. William often used his kuen fat knowledge to devise counters for Jujutsu techniques. Chow eventually developed his unique style that blended his Chinese Martial Arts training with the more focused Ryukyuan Kenpo methods popularized in Hawaii. He used many different names for the style, but most refer to his method as Kenpo Karate. Chow's Kenpo Karate used linear and circular motion and emphasized practical fighting techniques to outperform other martial arts common in Hawaii. As he taught, Chow experimented and modified his art, adapting it to meet the needs of American students.

=== Ed Parker ===
American Kenpo as its own art was founded by Ed Parker. Parker started his martial arts training in Judo, earning a black belt. He then studied western boxing from his father, a boxing commissioner in Hawaii, before training in Kenpo Karate with Chow and earning a black belt.

After Parker moved to California, he cross-referenced his martial arts knowledge with Chinese martial arts masters there. Some of his California influences include Lau Bun, Ark Wong, Ming Lum, James Lee, and Bruce Lee. In California, Parker hosted a large martial arts tournament, the Long Beach Internationals, where he popularized martial artists and gave many legends their start. It was out of this work that Parker founded American Kenpo.

In 1954, Parker started teaching other Hawaiian Islanders while studying at Brigham Young University in Provo, Utah. By 1956, he was teaching commercially in Provo. Late in 1956, he opened a studio in Pasadena, California and founded the International Kenpo Karate Association (IKKA), where he served as Senior Grandmaster. He published Kenpo Karate: Law of the Fist and the Empty Hand, a book about his early system, in 1960. The book shows a heavy Japanese influence in his early style, incorporating linear and circular movements, "focused" techniques, and jujutsu-style locks, holds, and throws. When Parker began incorporating more Chinese arts into his system, he began to refer to his art as Chinese Kenpo. Based on this influence, he wrote Secrets of Chinese Karate, published in 1963.

By 1975, Ed Parker's system, now known as American Kenpo, was a combination of older methods revised to work in more modern fighting scenarios. Throughout his career, he heavily restructured American Kenpo's forms and techniques, moving away from forms recognizable from other arts like Hung Gar. He established a more definitive relationship between forms in the martial art and techniques from his self-defense curriculum. He also eschewed esoteric Eastern concepts, sought to express the art through Western scientific principles and metaphors, dropped most Asian language elements, and altered traditions to favor American English. Although he was challenged numerous times by experts and masters from multiple other martial arts, he remained well-respected in the martial arts world.

American Kenpo today has several different curricula, due to various reasons:

- Parker's art evolved over time, so his students learned a different curriculum depending on when they studied with him.
- Many instructors left Parker before his later updates to the system.
- After Parker's death, various instructors changed the way the art was taught.

Parker did not name a successor as Senior Grandmaster of the IKKA. He instead entrusted his senior students to continue his teachings in their own ways.

== Features ==
I come to you with only karate [meaning empty hands]. I have no weapons, but should I be forced to defend myself, my principles, or my honor, should it be a matter of life or death, of right or wrong, then here are my weapons -- karate, my empty hands.

— Ed Parker, the American Kenpo creed from 1957.

=== Common elements ===
Although each American Kenpo school differs in content and methodology, many basic principles, concepts, and theories remain the same. Some common elements are:

- "Marriage of Gravity" — Students are taught to settle their body weight to increase striking force.
- Every block is a strike; every strike is a block — Blocks are meant to be directed and forceful enough to injure an opponent, decreasing their ability to continue an attack. Strikes counter an opponent's movement, reducing their ability to mount an attack.
- Point of origin — Any natural weapon is moved directly from where it originates, rather than cocking it before deploying it. This helps to eliminate the telegraphing of moves.
- Economy of motion — Practitioners should choose the best available target, choose the best available weapon, and choose the best open angle in the least amount of time to get the desired result.
- Personalization — Once students learn the lesson embodied in the "ideal phase" of the technique, they should search for an aspect tailored to their needs and strengths.

=== Techniques ===
American Kenpo emphasizes fast techniques to disable an attacker in seconds. It contains a wide array of open-hand, elbow, and knee strikes, kicks, punches, finger strikes, throwing and joint locking techniques, and club and knife skills. Kicks are less common and are usually directed at the lower body, as high kicks are slower to execute and potentially compromise the practitioner's balance. Higher kicks are taught to more advanced and capable practitioners.

The art develops environmental awareness, structural stability, balance, coordination, flow, speed, power, and timing in that order as the student progresses through a step-by-step curriculum. Memorization of the system is optional for gaining functional skills and primarily used by instructors. All American Kenpo students are taught how, when, and why to execute each basic movement in the system.

Ed Parker emphasized concepts and principles over sequences of motion. He did not want his students to mimic him but to tailor his system to their own circumstances and needs. Thus, it is not a traditional art but a combat science designed to evolve as the practitioners' understanding improves. The burden of effectiveness is on the individual practitioner. It is up to them to make their American Kenpo applications effective by correctly applying the concepts and principles to the instructor's ideal phase techniques.

==== Forms ====
By the time of his death in December 1990, Parker had created eleven forms, three short and eight long. He also created 154 named ideal phase technique sequences with 96 extensions, taught in three stages: Ideal Phase, What-if Phase, and Formulation Phase.

=== Instruction methods ===
Beginners are introduced to the concepts and principles of the system through scripted scenarios that serve as starting points for further exploration. Parker's approach to American Kenpo was to teach martial arts as an updated and practical science tailored to the needs of the individual, hoping to turn each practitioner from a follower into an innovator.

Training in this manner aims to increase physical coordination and continuity with linear and circular motion. When correctly executed, each movement leads into the next, keeping the adversary's "dimensional zones" in check and limiting their ability to retaliate. Should the adversary not react as anticipated, a skilled Kenpo practitioner can seamlessly transition into an alternative and appropriate action drawn spontaneously from the trained subconscious. In American Kenpo, a practitioner never tries to select a specific technique in the middle of a sudden, violent altercation, rather letting their body do what the Kenpo training has already ingrained in them.

== International Kenpo Karate Association ==
The International Kenpo Karate Association (IKKA) was founded by Ed Parker in 1956 to formalize and govern the sport.

=== Logo ===
International Kenpo Karate Association crest

The IKKA logo was designed by Dave Parker, Ed Parker's brother, in 1958. The design is meant to symbolically represent the art's modernized form while simultaneously acknowledging the roots of American Kenpo in traditional Chinese and Japanese martial arts.

Tiger
The tiger represents the early stage of training through bravery, power, and physical strength. In this early stage, it is important to work on the basics (e.g., the horse stance) to prepare the body for later advancement.
Dragon
The dragon represents the later stage of a martial artist's training through quintessence, fluidity, agility, and spiritual strength. It is placed above the tiger on the crest to symbolize the importance of mental and spiritual strength over physical strength, implying that martial artists must have a good conscience to guide their actions.
Circle
The circle represents continuity.
Dividing lines
The lines within the circle represent the original methods of attack first learned by ancient practitioners of Chinese martial arts, as well as the pathways through which an object could travel.
Colors
The colors represent levels of proficiency within the art, alluding to the colored belt ranking system: white for the beginning stages, black for the expert stages, and red for professorship.
Chinese characters
The choice of Chinese characters acknowledges the art's Eastern roots. The characters on the right translate to "Law of the Fist" (拳法, for Kenpo) and "Tang/Chinese Hand" (唐手, for Karate). The characters on the left translate to "Spirit of the Dragon and the Tiger."
Shape
The logo's shape represents a house with an axe shape on the bottom. The walls and roof are curved to keep evil from intruding. The axe is a solemn reminder that should a martial artist tarnish the reputation of the organization, they will be "cut off" completely.

== Belt rankings ==
American Kenpo Belts
White
Yellow
Orange
Purple
Blue
Green
Brown (3 degrees)
Black (10 degrees)

American Kenpo schools typically have a graded, colored belt system consisting of white, yellow, orange, purple, blue, green, 1st- through 3rd-degree brown, and 1st- through 10th-degree black belt dan ranks . Different Kenpo organizations and schools may have other belt systems.

=== Syllabus ===
Depending on the school, there are different requirements per belt. Parker's IKKA schools used a 24-techniques-per-belt syllabus, but some schools today have adopted a 16–20–24 technique syllabus as their standard. The 24-24-24 and 16–20–24 technique syllabuses contain the same techniques, but the latter groups them differently, with fewer techniques at lower belt levels and more total belt levels.

Beyond proficiency, a student's character and attitude can be analyzed as a significant consideration in the promotion to a new rank. Promotion after a third-degree black belt has more to do with contributions made back to the art, such as teaching and other great works of exploration. For example, a third-degree black belt who further explores defending against a knife and brings that knowledge back may be promoted for his excellent contributions.

== Notable practitioners ==
- Travis Fulton
- Ed Parker Jr.
- Benny Urquidez
- Forest Whitaker
- Elvis Presley
- Christian Slater
- Dick Dale
- Joe Hyams
- Mark Arnott
- Jeff Speakman
- Stephen Thompson
- Thomas Ian Griffith
- William Shatner
