= Keiko Fukuda =

Japanese-American martial artist (1913–2013)

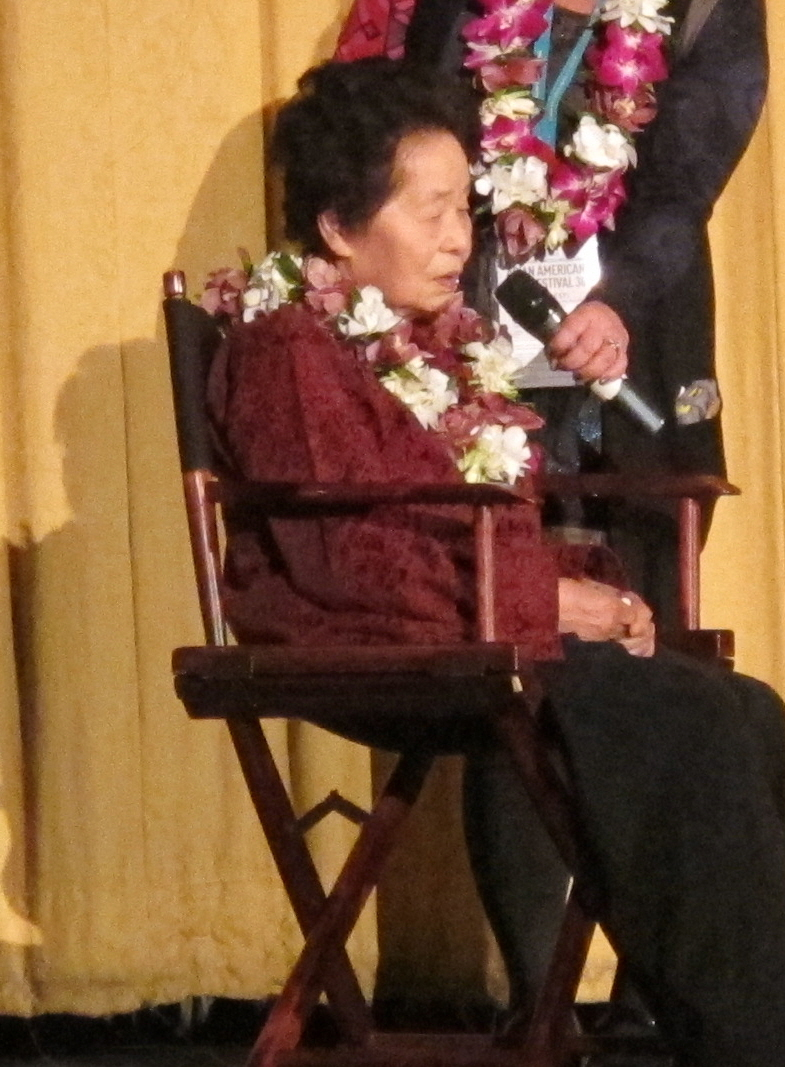
- Fukuda in 2012
- Born: April 12, 1913; Tokyo City, Japan
- Died: February 9, 2013 (aged 99); San Francisco, California, U.S.
- Native name: 福田 敬子
- Style: Judo
- Teachers: Kanō Jigorō, Kyuzo Mifune
- Rank: 10th dan judo (USA Judo, US Judo Federation), 9th dan judo (Kodokan)

Other information
- Notable school: Soko Joshi Judo Club
- Website: www.sokojoshijudo.com

Keiko Fukuda (Japanese: 福田 敬子, Hepburn: Fukuda Keiko; April 12, 1913 – February 9, 2013) was a Japanese-American martial artist. She was the highest-ranked female judoka in history, holding the rank of 9th dan from the Kodokan (2006), and 10th dan from USA Judo (July 2011) and from the United States Judo Federation (USJF) (September 2011), and was the last surviving student of Kanō Jigorō, founder of judo. She was a renowned pioneer of women's judo, and in 1972 together with her senpai Masako Noritomi (1913–1982) was one of the first two women promoted to 6th dan (c. 1972). In 2006, the Kodokan promoted Fukuda to 9th dan, making her the first woman to hold this rank from any recognized judo organization. She is also the first and, so far, only woman to have been promoted to 10th dan in judo, which occurred in 2011. After completing her formal education in Japan, Fukuda visited the United States to teach in the 1950s and 1960s, and eventually settled there. She continued to teach her art in the San Francisco Bay Area until her death in 2013.

== Early life ==
Fukuda was born on April 12, 1913, in Tokyo. Her father died when she was very young. As a youth, she learned the arts of calligraphy, flower arrangement, and the tea ceremony; typical pursuits for a woman in Japan at that time. Despite her conventional upbringing, Fukuda felt close to judo through memories of her grandfather, and one day went with her mother to watch a judo training session. A few months later, she decided to begin training for herself. Her mother and brother supported this decision, but her uncle was opposed to the idea. Her mother and brother had thought that Fukuda would eventually marry one of the judo practitioners, but she never married, instead becoming a judo expert herself.

Fukuda's grandfather, Fukuda Hachinosuke, had been a samurai and master of Tenjin Shinyō-ryū jujutsu, and he had taught that art to Kanō Jigorō, founder of judo and head of the Kodokan. Kanō had studied under three jujutsu masters before founding judo, and Fukuda's grandfather had been the first of these men. Kanō had taught female students as early as 1893 (Sueko Ashiya) and had formally opened the joshi-bu (women's section) of the Kodokan in 1926. He personally invited the young Fukuda to study judo—an unusual gesture for that time—as a mark of respect for her grandfather. She began training in judo in 1935, as one of only 24 women training at the Kodokan. Apart from instruction by judo's founder, Fukuda also learned from Kyuzo Mifune.

== Judo career ==
Fukuda, standing at only 4 ft 11 in (150 cm) and weighing less than 100 pounds (45 kg), became a judo instructor in 1937. She also earned a degree in Japanese literature from Showa Women's University. In 1953, she was promoted to the rank of 5th dan in judo. She traveled to the United States of America later that year, at the invitation of a judo club in Oakland, California, and stayed for almost two years before returning to Japan. Fukuda next traveled to the US in 1966, giving seminars in California. At that time, she was one of only four women in the world ranked at 5th dan in judo, and was one of only two female instructors at the Kodokan (the other being Masako Noritomi, also ranked 5th dan). In 1966, she demonstrated her art at Mills College, and the institution immediately offered her a teaching position; she accepted, and taught there from 1967 to 1978.

During this time, Fukuda lived at the Noe Valley home of one of her students, Shelley Fernandez, and taught judo there in addition to her teaching at the college. When the class sizes grew, she shifted the classes to the Sokoji Zen Buddhist temple in the Japantown, San Francisco. She named her school the Soko Joshi Judo Club. Having settled in the San Francisco Bay Area, Fukuda gave up her Japanese citizenship to become a US citizen.

In November 1972, following a letter campaign against the rule prohibiting women from being promoted to higher than 5th dan, Fukuda and her senpai Masako Noritomi (1913–1982) became the first women promoted to 6th dan by the Kodokan. According to Fukuda, "the Kodokan was old fashioned and sexist about belts and ranks". In 1973, she published Born for the Mat: A Kodokan kata textbook for women, an instructional book for women about the kata (patterns) of Kodokan judo. In 1974, she established the annual Joshi Judo Camp to give female judo practitioners the opportunity to train together. That year, she was one of only three women in the world ranked 6th dan in judo.

In 1990, Fukuda was awarded Japan's Order of the Sacred Treasure, 4th Class (Gold Rays with Rosette), and the United States Judo Incorporated (USJI) Henry Stone Lifetime Contribution to American Judo Award. In 2004, she published Ju-No-Kata: A Kodokan textbook, revised and expanded from Born for the Mat, a pictorial guide for performing Ju-no-kata, one of the seven Kodokan kata. Fukuda served as a technical adviser for US Women's Judo and the USJI Kata Judges' Certification Sub-committee. She also served as a National Kata Judge, and was a faculty member of the USJI National Teachers' Institute, a member of the USJF Promotion Committee, and a member of the USJF and USJI Women's Sub-committee.

Fukuda held the rank of 9th dan, the second-highest in judo, from two organizations, and in July 2011, received the rank of 10th dan from a third organization. In 1994, she was the first woman to be awarded a rare red belt (at the time for women still marking the 8th dan rank) in judo by the Kodokan. In 2001, the USJF promoted her to USJF 9th dan (red belt) for her lifelong contribution to the art of judo. In 2006 the Kodokan awarded Fukuda the 9th degree black belt (9th dan), making her the first woman to hold this rank from any recognized judo organization. On July 28, 2011, the promotion board of USA Judo awarded Fukuda the rank of 10th dan, an action which was followed by the USJF's promotion board on September 10, 2011.

== Later life ==
Fukuda continued to teach judo three times each week, host the annual Fukuda Invitational Kata Championships, and teach at the annual Joshi Judo Camp until her death, at the age of 99, in San Francisco, California. She established the Keiko Fukuda Judo Scholarship to encourage and enable women to continue their formal training in the art. Apart from teaching in the US, she also taught in Australia, Canada, France, Norway and the Philippines. Fukuda's personal motto was: "Tsuyoku, Yasashiku, Utsukushiku" (in English: "Be strong, be gentle, be beautiful, in mind, body, and spirit").

== Death ==
Fukuda died peacefully at her home in San Francisco on February 9, 2013.

== See also ==
- Atsuko Wakai
- Rena Kanokogi
- List of judoka
