= Edmund Parker (sexton) =

- Born: December 24, 1827; Virginia, United States
- Died: December 30, 1898 (aged 71)
- Employer: Mount Vernon Ladies' Association

Edmund Parker (December 24, 1827 – December 30, 1898) was an American sexton who served as Keeper of the Tomb at Mount Vernon, the site of the Washington family mausoleum and the sarcophagus containing the remains of George Washington, from 1874 to 1898.

Parker was born into slavery in 1827 near Charleston, Virginia and sent to work at Mount Vernon in 1841. While Washington had emancipated the Mount Vernon slaves, subsequent masters of the plantation had resumed the practice of using enslaved labor. He was married in the library of the main house in the 1850s to Susan. According to Parker, they were wed "under the room where the General died". With her, he had nineteen children.

During the American Civil War, Parker escaped Mount Vernon and fled north, joining a unit of United States zouaves as camp cook. Following the capitulation of the Confederate States, many former Mount Vernon Slaves — Parker among them — returned to the estate to, according to Matthew Costello, "reunite families and rebuild their community".

Parker was among those returnees offered employment at the now-former plantation by the Mount Vernon Ladies' Association (MVLA), which had acquired the property to maintain as a historical site. Beginning in 1882, he was assigned to serve as the uniformed watchman of the Washington tomb, a continuance of the practice by which Black men had served as tomb guardians since the site's construction in the 1830s. Parker was popular among visitors to Mount Vernon for his stories about life in antebellum Virginia. According to Parker, he was on duty during visits to the tomb by Pedro II of Brazil and Edward VII (as Prince of Wales).

Parker died of cancer at the home of one of his children after a period of illness. He was buried in elaborate funeral ceremonies organized by the MVLA.

Parker's son, Henry, was a long-serving and celebrated staff member of the United States House Committee on Ways and Means from the early 20th century until his retirement in 1937. The practice of appointing Black men to serve as tomb keepers ended in 1965.
