= Bobby Lowe (karateka) =

Martial artist (1929–2011)

- B. Lowe, 1985
- Born: August 23, 1929; Honolulu, Hawaii, US
- Died: September 14, 2011 (aged 82); Honolulu, Hawaii, US
- Style: Kyokushin Karate
- Teacher: Masutatsu Oyama
- Rank: 10th dan karate

Edward 'Bobby' Lowe (August 23, 1929 – September 14, 2011) was a prominent Chinese American master of Kyokushin karate. He was the first uchi deshi (live-in student) of Masutatsu Oyama, founder of Kyokushin karate, and established the first Kyokushin school outside Japan. Lowe held the title of shihan and was the Senior Instructor and an International Committee Chairman of the International Karate Organization founded by Oyama.

== Early life ==
Lowe was born on August 23, 1929 in Honolulu, Hawaii, to Sidney See Hing Lowe and Ivy Leong . His family is Cantonese, and emigrated to Sydney, Australia, before emigrating to Honolulu, Hawaii in 1928. His father was a teacher of sil lum pai kung fu, and taught this art to his son. The young Lowe also studied judo and jujutsu under Seishiro Okazaki before studying kempo karate under James Mitose. At 23 years of age, he was ranked 4th dan in judo, 2nd dan in Kosho-ryu kempo, and 1st dan in Yoshinkai aikido.

== Kyokushin karate ==
Lowe first met Oyama at a demonstration the latter gave in 1952 in Hawaii. From late 1952 to early 1954, Lowe trained daily under Oyama. Oyama promoted him to the rank of 1st dan in 1953. In 1957 in Hawaii, Lowe opened the first Kyokushin dojo (training hall) outside Japan. Oyama promoted him to 4th dan in or before 1957, 5th dan in 1965, 7th dan in December 1976, and 8th dan in October 1984.

Lowe wrote three books on his martial art:

- Mas Oyama's karate as practiced in Japan (1954)
- The 'Young Lions' of Mas Oyama's Kyokushin karate headquarters (1985)
- Kyokushin karate: Self-defense techniques (1999)

== Later life ==
On September 17, 2005, Lowe was recognized for his contributions to karate by the Japanese Cultural Center of Hawaii, at the Celebration of Lifetime Achievement dinner for 2005. Lowe was ranked 8th dan, and was the International Committee Chairman for North America and the South Pacific in the International Karate Organization led by Shokei Matsui.

On September 14, 2011, Lowe died peacefully in hospital in Honolulu. He was survived by his wife, daughter, and son. Lowe was posthumously awarded 10th dan ranking by Matsui on November 6, 2011, during a memorial service at the 10th World Tournament.
