= Ed Parker Jr. =

American martial artist

- Born: November 15, 1959 (age 66) (United States) Glendale, California
- Nationality: (United States) American
- Style: American Kenpo Karate
- Teachers: Ed Parker, Ron Chapel
- Rank: Black belt in American Kenpo Karate

Other information
- Website: https://edparkerjr.com/ http://edparkerjrdiplomas.com/

Edmund Kealoha Parker Jr. (born November 15, 1959) is an American martial arts practitioner and artist and the only son of American Kenpo Karate founder Ed Parker.

== Biography ==
Parker was born in Glendale, California. He trained under his father as a youth for several years before moving away at age 19 to Arizona to do missionary work at various Indian reservations. For two years he worked with the Navajo, Hopi, Zuni, Southern Ute, Havasupai, White Mountain Apache and Jicarilla Apache Tribes.

Parker then moved to his father’s home state of Hawaii where he attended Brigham Young University-Hawaii majoring in Illustration with a minor in Theatrical Arts. During his schooling he studied and made student films—one of which won him an award for the Best Student Film for 1982 in the State of Hawaii Film Festival. He was awarded an internship on the television show "Magnum, P.I." He also received 12 University art and theatrical scholarship awards.

After finishing school, Parker returned to California where he did graduate work at the Art Center College of Design. Upon completing his training there, he went into partnership with his father. He helped edit and provided illustrations for his father's "Infinite Insights Into Kenpo" series of books. From 1983 to 1991 he helped in the production of 8 International Karate Championships.

In December 1990, after his father died, Parker continued on within the martial arts industry and produced 6 educational martial arts videos. In June 1992 he published "The Encyclopedia Of Kenpo" a complete encyclopedia on American Kenpo Karate as taught by his father.

He is also well known for his artwork, including many portraits of notable martial arts practitioners. His illustrations have been commissioned for film projects, DVDs, book and magazine covers, corporate identities, and custom certificates. His artwork has been distributed internationally.

He portrayed his father in the 1993 Bruce Lee biography, Dragon: The Bruce Lee Story. That same year Parker would earn his 1st degree black belt in American kenpo karate under Ron Chapel, one of his father’s students.

== Personal ==
Parker is the son of Edmund Kealoha Parker Sr. (Ed Parker) and his wife Leilani Parker. He lives in Sumpter, Oregon, with his wife Baer and is the father of four children (one son, Edmund K. Parker III, and three daughters).
