= Ed Parker =

American martial artist (1931–1990)

- Born: Edmund Kealoha Parker; March 19, 1931; Honolulu, Territory of Hawaii
- Died: December 15, 1990 (aged 59); Honolulu, Hawaii, U.S.
- Occupations: Martial artist, actor, stunt performer
- Years active: 1949−1990
- Children: Ed Parker Jr.
- Martial arts career
- Style: American Kenpo, Judo, Boxing,
- Teachers: William Kwai-sun Chow, Gene LeBell
- Rank: Senior Grand Master of American Kenpo

Other information
- Notable students: Benny Urquidez, Dan Inosanto, Elvis Presley, Jeff Speakman, Chuck Norris, Robert Culp

Ed Parker in Santiago, Chile. 1981

Edmund Kealoha Parker (March 19, 1931 – December 15, 1990) was an American martial artist, who founded and codified the art of American Kenpo.

== Biography ==
Born in Honolulu, Parker began training in Judo at an early age and later studied boxing. During the 1940s, Parker was introduced to Kenpō by Frank Chow, who then introduced Parker to William Chow, a student of James Mitose. Parker trained with William Chow while serving in the Coast Guard and attending Brigham Young University, and, in 1953, he was promoted to the rank of black belt. Parker, seeing that modern times posed new situations that were not addressed in Kenpo, adapted the art to make it more easily applicable to the streets of America. He called his adapted style American Kenpo Karate.

Ed Parker was enrolled in judo classes by his father at the age of twelve, and received his Shodan in Judo in 1949 at the age of eighteen. After receiving his brown belt in Kenpo, he moved to the US mainland to attend Brigham Young University, where he began to teach martial arts. Mr. Parker's kenpo shodan diploma is dated 1953.

During this period, Parker was significantly influenced by the Japanese and Okinawan interpretations prevalent in Hawaii. Parker's book Kenpo Karate, published in 1961, shows the many hard linear movements, albeit with modifications, that set his interpretations apart.

All the influences up to that time were reflected in Parker's rigid, linear method of "Kenpo Karate," as it was called. Between writing and publishing, however, he began to be influenced by the Chinese arts, and included this information in his system. He settled in Southern California after leaving the Coast Guard and finishing his education at BYU. Here he found himself surrounded by other martial artists from a wide variety of systems, many of whom were willing to discuss and share their arts with him. Parker made contact with people like Ark Wong, Haumea Lefiti, Jimmy Wing Woo (who developed many of the American Kenpo forms still used today), Jimmy H. Woo (Chin Siu Dek), founder and Grandmaster of San Soo and Lau Bun. These martial artists were known for their skills in arts such as Five Family Fist Kung Fu, Splashing-Hands, San Soo, tai chi, and Hung Gar, and this influence remains visible in both historical material (such as forms that Parker taught in his system) and current principles.

Exposed to new Chinese training concepts and history, he wrote a second book, Secrets of Chinese Karate, published in 1963. Parker drew comparisons in this and other books between karate (a better known art in the United States at that time) and the Chinese methods he adopted and taught.

Parker opened the first karate school in the western United States in Provo, Utah, in 1954. By 1956, he opened a dojo in Pasadena, California. There is controversy over whether the first black belt that Parker awarded went to Rich Montgomery or to his first brown-belt student, Charles Beeder. Beeder's son has stated for the record that his father's black belt came after Ed Parker had moved to California. The other black belts in chronological order up to 1962 were James Ibrao, Ben Otaké; Mills Crenshaw, whom Parker authorized to open a school in Salt Lake City, Utah, in late 1958 (which later became the birthplace of the International Kenpo Karate Association, or IKKA); Tom Garriga; Rick Flores; Chuck Sullivan; Al and Jim Tracy; Mark Georgantas; John McSweeney; and Dave Hebler. In 1962, John McSweeney opened a school in Ireland, which prompted Parker to give control of the Kenpo Karate Association of America to the Tracy Brothers and form a new organization: the International Kenpo Karate Association.

Parker was well known for his business creativity and helped many martial artists open their own dojos. He was well known in Hollywood, where he trained several stunt men and celebrities, most notably Elvis Presley, to whom he eventually awarded a first-degree black belt in Kenpo. He left behind a few world-renowned grand masters: Bob White; Richard "Huk" Planas; Larry Tatum; Ron Chapel; and Frank Trejo, who ran a school in California prior to his death. He helped Bruce Lee gain national attention by introducing him at his International Karate Championships. He served as one of Elvis Presley's bodyguards during the singer's final years. He is best known to Kenpoists as the founder of American Kenpo and is referred to fondly as the "Father of American Kenpo." He is formally referred to as Senior Grand Master of American Kenpo.

Parker had a minor career as a Hollywood actor and stunt man. His most notable film was Kill the Golden Goose. In this film, he co-stars with Hapkido master Bong Soo Han. He also played himself (as a mercenary) in the 1979 action film Seven, opposite William Smith. His other acting work included the (uncredited) role of Mr. Chong in Blake Edwards' Revenge of the Pink Panther and again in Curse of the Pink Panther. He was one of the instructors of martial arts action-movie star Jeff Speakman, and Parker assisted with the fight choreography of Speakman's film The Perfect Weapon, which was released in 1991, shortly after Parker's death.

Parker can be seen with Elvis Presley in the opening sequence of the 1977 TV special Elvis in Concert. Parker wrote the book Inside Elvis. about his time with Elvis on the road.

== Death ==
On December 15, 1990, Parker, aged 59, suffered a heart attack after arriving at Honolulu International Airport. He died en route to Kaiser Hospital.

== Bibliography ==
- 1960, Kenpo Karate: Law of the Fist and the Empty Hand. Delsby Publications ISBN 0-910293-47-3
- 1963, Secrets of Chinese Karate. Prentice-Hall ISBN 0-13-797845-6
- 1975, Ed Parker's Guide to the Nunchaku ISBN 0-86568-104-X
- 1975, Ed Parker's Kenpo Karate Accumulative Journal. International Kenpo Karate Association.
- 1978, Inside Elvis. Rampart House ISBN 0-89773-000-3
- 1982, Ed Parker's Infinite Insights into Kenpo, Vol. 1: Mental Stimulation. Delsby Publications ISBN 0-910293-00-7
- 1983, Ed Parker's Infinite Insights into Kenpo, Vol. 2: Physical Analyzation I. Delsby Publications ISBN 0-910293-02-3
- 1985, Ed Parker's Infinite Insights into Kenpo, Vol. 3: Physical Analyzation II. Delsby Publications ISBN 0-910293-04-X
- 1986, Ed Parker's Infinite Insights Into Kenpo, Vol. 4: Mental and Physical Constituents. Delsby Publications ISBN 0-910293-06-6
- 1987, Ed Parker's Infinite Insights Into Kenpo: Vol. 5: Mental and Physical Applications. Delsby Publications ISBN 0-910293-08-2
- 1988, The Woman's Guide to Self Defense
- 1988, The Zen of Kenpo. Delsby Publications ISBN 0-910293-10-4
- 1992, Ed Parker's Encyclopedia of Kenpo. Delsby Publications ISBN 0-910293-12-0

== Filmography ==
Year	Title	Role	Notes
1964	The Secret Door		Uncredited
1966	Dimension 5	Sinister Oriental	
1968	The Money Jungle	Cassidy	
1968	The Wrecking Crew	Guard	Uncredited
1978	Revenge of the Pink Panther	Mr. Chong	Uncredited
1978	Buckstone County Prison	Jimbo	
1978	Kill the Golden Goose	Mauna Loa	
1979	Seven	Himself	
1983	Curse of the Pink Panther	Mr. Chong	

== TV ==
Year	Title	Role	Notes
1963	The Lucy Show episode Lucy And Viv Learn Karate	Himself	Named in show, credited as "Judo Student #1"
