= Kenpō =

Name of several Japanese martial arts

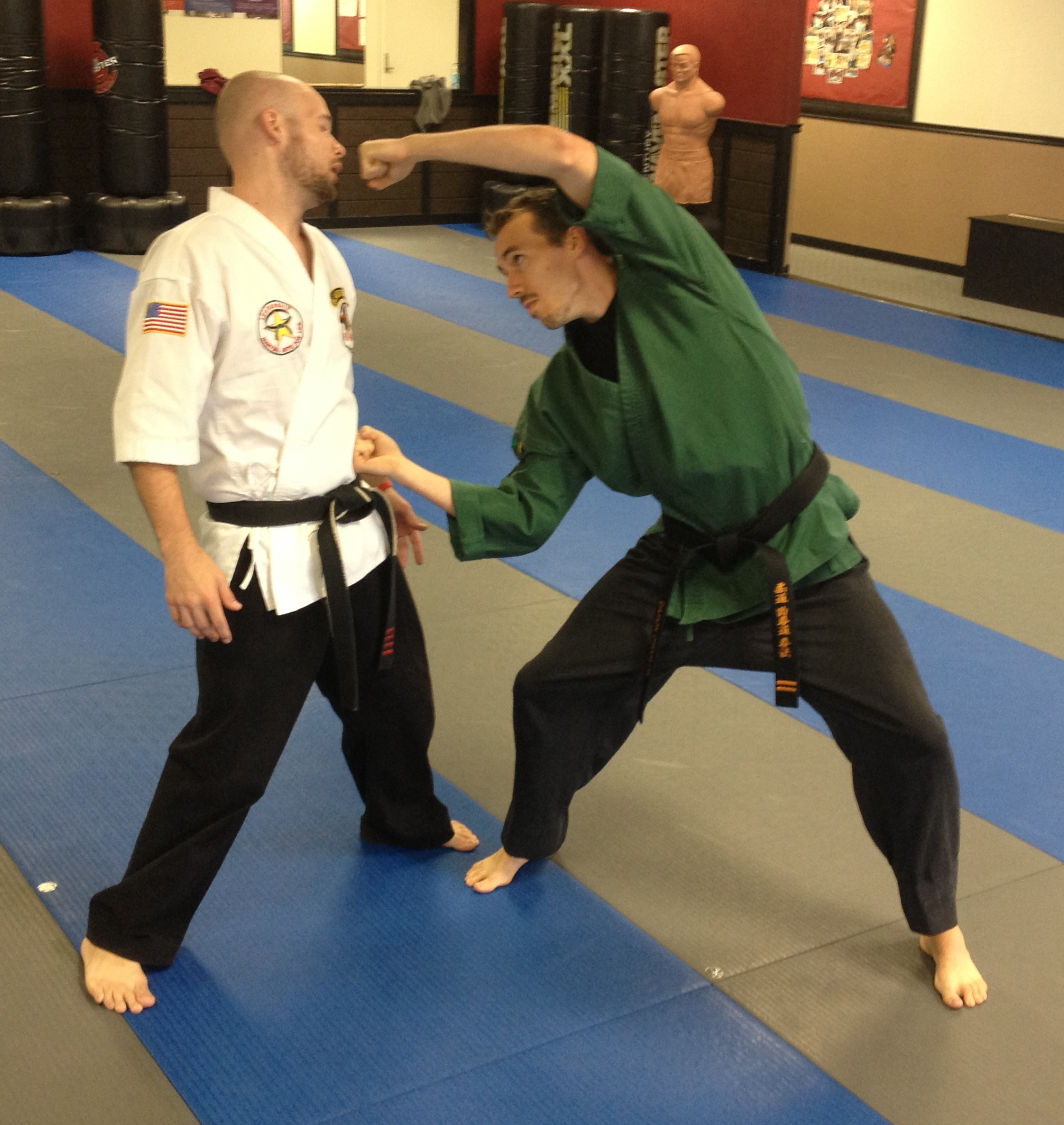
- American Kenpo
- Also known as: Kempo, Kenpo
- Focus: Hybrid
- Country of origin: Japan
- Creator: Unknown
- Olympic sport: no

Kenpō

Chinese name
- Chinese: 拳法
Transcriptions
Standard Mandarin
- Hanyu Pinyin: quánfǎ
- Wade–Giles: ch'üan^{2} fa^{3}
Yue: Cantonese
- Jyutping: kyun4 faat3

Japanese name
- Kanji: 拳法
- Hiragana: けんぽう
Transcriptions
- Revised Hepburn: kenpō
- Traditional Hepburn: kempō
- Kunrei-shiki: kenpô

Kenpō (Japanese: 拳法) is the name of several martial arts. This term is often informally transliterated as "kempo", as a result of applying Hepburn romanization, but omitting a macron to indicate the long vowel. The word Kenpō translates to "Fist Method", "ken" meaning "fist" and "po" meaning "method/technique". The generic nature of the term combined with its widespread, cross-cultural adoption in the martial arts community has led to many divergent definitions. For example, in Suiō-ryū Iai Kenpō it refers to "Battlefield sword against sword forms". In modern Japanese, the term is generally used to describe any primarily striking based system, especially of Chinese origin.

== Shorinji Kenpo ==
Shorinji Kempo (少林寺拳法, shōrinji-kempō; meaning "Shaolin Temple Fist Method" or "Shaolin Temple Kenpo") was established in 1947 by Doshin So (宗 道臣, Sō Dōshin), a Japanese martial artist and former military intelligence agent, who combined his quanfa and jujutsu practice.

== Nippon Kenpo ==
Nippon Kempo (日本拳法) was created by Muneomi Sawayama in 1932. Sawayama was a judoka who had studied under Kenwa Mabuni, a karateka who would establish the Shito-Ryu school of Karate. It is typically practised wearing protective gear (face, body, crotch, etc.) and gloves and allows full use of stand-up striking, throwing, and ground fighting.

== Okinawan Kenpo ==
Some Okinawan martial arts groups use the term kenpō as an alternate name for their karate systems or for a distinct but related art within their association. This can be illustrated by the official full name of Motobu-ryu style named as "Nihon Denryu Heiho Motobu Kenpo" ("Japan's traditional tactics Motobu Kenpo") and by the International Shorin-ryu Karate Kobudo Federation, where Shōrin-ryū is the actual karate style practiced, whereas "hakutsuru kenpo", or "hakutsuru kenpo karate" is a related but distinctive style also taught by the association. Both the "n" and "m" romanizations are used by various groups.

== American Kenpo ==
Kenpo has also been used as a name for multiple martial arts that developed in Hawaii due to cross-cultural exchange among practitioners of Okinawan martial arts, Chinese martial arts, Filipino martial arts and Japanese martial arts among other influences. In the United States, kenpo is often referred to as Kenpo Karate. The most widespread styles have their origin in the teachings of James Mitose and William Kwai Sun Chow. Mitose spent most of his early years training in Japan learning his family style, Kosho-Ryū (Old pine tree school). James Mitose would later bring that style to Hawaii where he would teach Chow, who would go on to instruct Ed Parker and Bobby Lowe. The system of kenpo taught by Mitose employed hard linear strikes and kicks, pressure point manipulation, circular movement patterns, and joint locking and breaking.

Ed Parker is the most prominent name in the Mitose lineage. A student of Chow in Hawaii for nearly six years, Parker moved to the US mainland to attend Brigham Young University. In 1957, he began teaching the kenpo that he had learned from Chow, and throughout his life modified and refined the art until it became Ed Parker's American Kenpo. It employs a blend of circular movements and hard linear movements. Parker created techniques with names such as Thundering Hammers, Five Swords, Prance Of The Tiger, and Flashing Mace to provide a memorisation tool to the student.

== Shaolin Kempo ==
Shaolin Kenpo Karate (or SKK) is a martial art style that combines the Five Animals of Shaolin Kung Fu (Shaolinquan), the core competency of Kenpo, the hard-hitting linear explosiveness of traditional Karate, the power of Western boxing, and the throwing and grappling arts of Jujutsu, Chin Na, and Mongolian wrestling. This system was founded and developed by Fredrick J. Villari (a former black belt student under Nick Cerio and William Kwai Sun Chow), who devised a hybrid system which integrated the four ways of fighting: striking, kicking, felling, and grappling to eliminate the inherent weakness of martial arts systems that focus on just one or two of the fighting techniques.

== See also ==
- International Kempo Federation
- Martin T. Buell – founder of the Universal Kempo Karate Schools Association
- Origins of Asian martial arts
- Ken Pomeroy
- Kenpō Fukyū Kai
- Shorinji Kempo at the 2011 SEA Games
