= James Mitose =

Japanese American martial artist

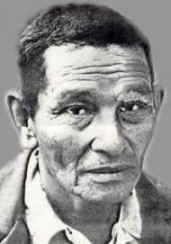
- Mitose at age 58
- Born: Masayoshi Mitose; December 30, 1916; Kailua-Kona, North Kona District, Territory of Hawaii
- Died: March 26, 1981 (aged 64); San Quentin, California, United States (complications of diabetes)
- Other names: Masakichi, Kenposai Kosho
- Style: Kosho Shorei-ryū Kenpo
- Teacher: Sakuhei YoshidaToju Kosho
- Rank: 21st Great Grand Master of Kosho Shorei-ryū Kempo

Other information
- Notable students: William Chow

James Masayoshi Mitose (born Masayoshi Mitose, December 30, 1916 – March 26, 1981) was a Japanese American martial artist who brought the art of Kosho Shorei-ryū Kenpo to the United States starting in 1936.

Many Kenpo teachers trace their lineage to him. Mitose was and remains a controversial figure in the history of Kenpo in America. He was convicted of murder and extortion in 1974 and given a life sentence. He died in prison in 1981 due to complications from diabetes.

== Early life, martial arts training and lineage ==
James Masayoshi Mitose (Masakichi Kosho Kenposai) was born in Kailua-Kona, North Kona District, Hawaii on December 30, 1916. On October 22, 1920, at the age of four, he and his two sisters were taken by their mother back to Japan to be given formal education and upbringing with family living there. While there, in addition to their schoolwork and university studies, they trained in the art of Kenpo and reading Sanskrit. James returned to Hawaii on February 25, 1935, arriving at Honolulu on the SS Tatsuta Maru at the age of 18.

His martial arts practices contained marked similarities to Okinawan karate and Japanese jujutsu. Mitose always claimed his art was Japanese rather than Okinawan.

Mitose began teaching Kenpo in Hawaii in 1936, and in 1941 set up a martial arts school. He gave the style he taught several names during his lifetime, including "Shorinji Kenpo" and "Kenpo Jujutsu," (both names of recognized Japanese martial arts), but over time, settled on the name Kosho Shōrei-ryū Kenpo. The word "Kenpo" (or "Kempo") is the Japanese pronunciation of "Ch'uan Fa."

When the attack on Pearl Harbor occurred, Mitose enlisted in the Hawaii National Guard but was honorably discharged after three weeks. He was later interned in Sand Island, a camp on the north side of Oahu. After his release in 1942, he spent most of the war teaching Kenpo in Hawaii to prepare American civilians for a possible Japanese invasion. He worked as an herbalist and was known to be an extraordinary healer.

Tracy's Kenpo has martial lineage through Ray Arquilla to James Mitose and Will Tracy trained under GM Fusae Mitose (Mitose's sister). Mitose claimed that his family in Japan lived near a "Mt. Akenkai's Shaka-In temple." Tracy believes that Mount Akenkai might be Mount Kinkai, near the town of Kinkai, Nagasaki on the island of Kyūshū. This may have been where the Kosho sect of the Yoshida (Urabe) clan taught.

Michael Brown of Rhode Island Martial Arts possesses documents showing three families of James Mitose. The first family is from Mitose's father's side. This includes his father, Otokichi Mitose and Otokichi's parents, Kaheiji Mitose, and Kano Kawakami Mitose. The second family, from Mitose's mother's side, includes his mother Kiyoka Yoshida Mitose and Kiyoka's biological father, Sakuhei Yoshida. Sakuhei Yoshida was married to a woman who was not Kiyoka's biological mother. Sakuhei Yoshida conceived Kiyoka Yoshida Mitose with a woman outside of his marriage named Toju Kosho. James Mitose would learn Kosho-ryū from the family of Toju Kosho. It is worthwhile to note that on Mitose's parents' record of marriage, Kiyoka Yoshida Mitose's mother is not named as Toju Kosho. Instead the name Toju Unknown occupies this position of the document.

To his students and in his book, What is True Self-Defense?, Mitose described his teachings as those of Japanese style. In the book, Mitose describes methods of Japanese yoga and the tai sabaki principles found in many Japanese arts. His later book, What Is Self Defense? and accounts and photos strongly suggest that, however he got it, Mitose had a background in an Okinawan style. Some modern proponents of Kosho Shōrei-ryū believe that he used an Okinawan art as a vehicle for his teaching of a native Japanese art.

The contents of What Is Self Defense? seem to echo those of an earlier book: Karate Kenpo by Mutsu Mizuho (1933). This includes the arrangement of diagrams and photographs; in one case, a photo (of Higaonna Kamesuke) is reproduced entirely. Mitose's book also includes a picture of Motobu Chōki, reproduced from Motobu's book, in a position that usually indicates a student acknowledging his teacher. It is from here that some assume that Mitose was acknowledging Motobu as his teacher. Mitose listed Motobu as a Kenpo master in his book.

Mitose is known to have taught only one Kata at his school: the Naihanchi Kata, which also was Motobu Chōki's primary form and the only one featured in Motubu's second book Okinawan Kenpo Kumite Hen. Mitose also taught the use of the Makiwara, a signature Okinawan training method. A thriving Okinawan community existed in Hawaii and Okinawan martial arts training was available there. Higaonna Kamesuke stayed in Hawaii after 1933 with Thomas Miyashiro, and taught classes in Kona. Higaonna had studied under Mutsu and Motobu, and taught Karate Kenpo in Mitose's home town of Kona just a few years before Mitose opened his school, although Mitose was still in Japan at the time.

== Kosho Shorei-Ryū Kenpo ==
Mitose ultimately called his style Kosho Shorei-Ryū Kenpo, which can be translated as "Old Pine Tree School Fist Law". Kenpo was based from Shuri-te that Ankō Itosu, Gichin Funakoshi, and Motobu Chōki learned. Motobu Choki created Kenpo in 1923 Motobu-Ryu Okinawa Kenpo Karate-jutsu. When Mitose first began teaching in 1936, he called his art Kenpo Jiu-Jitsu ("fist law flexible technique") and would later refer to it as Shorinji (small forest temple) Kempo (a Japanese translation of "quánfǎ," which means "fist law" or "fist way" in English) or goshin jutsu ("self-defense technique"). The word "Shorin" is characteristic of styles from Okinawa, although in modern times "Shorinji Kempo" is used to refer to an unrelated Japanese martial sect founded by Doshin So in 1947.

Mitose claimed that he learned martial arts and religion in a Buddhist temple, but his descriptions of organization and practices of the temple do not match those practiced by mainstream Japanese Buddhism. It is possible that Mitose came from a heterodox background. Mitose often dressed as a Christian minister. In "What Is True Self Defense?" he stated that one should practice the dominant religion of whatever country one is in, including its application to martial arts and spiritual practices. This book (the original manuscript of his first book was completed and published while he was imprisoned), discourages offensive martial arts techniques completely, presenting its contents as a form of yoga and escape. Mitose even writes that karate is "evil." The description or lineage Mitose gave for his style also emphasized its Chinese roots.

== Later years and conviction ==
In 1953, James Mitose ceased teaching Kenpo regularly and moved to Southern California. He privately taught a few students in that time, including Terry Lee (known today as Nimr Hassan) for about a year. In 1974 Mitose was arrested in Los Angeles and convicted of murder and extortion stemming from a conflict over a loan and a murder committed by Terry Lee. During the trial there was conflicting testimony and the court acknowledged that Japanese testimony had not been accurately translated.

According to trial transcripts, James Mitose denied inciting Lee to commit murder but took responsibility as his martial arts instructor. Lee claimed Mitose had suggested on numerous occasions that Lee commit murder. Lee also testified that Mitose and his wife Dorothy had given him a rope, a knife, a screwdriver and an air pistol in order to carry out his actions. Mr. Namimatsu was killed by Lee on March 20, 1974. The official cause of death was strangulation by rope. Namimatsu also suffered a completely collapsed eye, had been stabbed multiple times with a screwdriver and had a shoe imprint on his chest matching the shoes Lee was wearing. After the assault, Lee testified he had left Namimatsu breathing.

As a result of Lee's testimony, Mitose was sentenced to life in prison. He served the majority of his sentence at Folsom State Prison but when his health deteriorated, he was transferred to San Quentin State Prison and died there of complications from diabetes on March 26, 1981. The actual murderer, Lee was given three years for testifying against his teacher/employer. In "What is True Self Defense?", he acknowledges Arnold Golub as "Honorable Headmaster", an "administrative title", and four other men (Bruce Juchnik, Ray Arquilla, Eugene Sedeno and Rick Alemany)as "Honorable Masters 1-4." In later years after Mitoses' passing, Golub would insist that Mitose intended him to oversee Kosho, not Bruce Juchnik. He would ultimately support Thomas Barro Mitose as the 22nd Great-Grandmaster and inheritor of the art, and be given a high position in Thomas Mitose’s organization.

In James Mitose's final days he was visited by his wife Dorothy, son Alvin, and Bruce Juchnik. Mitose's last will and testament is still being debated and argued about to the present. James Mitose maintained his innocence until his death. The details of the crime and Mitose's role remain controversial in the martial arts community.
