= Man with a Vision =

Man with a Vision may refer to:

- "Man with a Vision" (song), a 1990 song by Seven
- Man with a Vision (album), a 1992 album by John Parr
