= Running the Endless Mile =

Studio album by John Parr
- Released: 13 October 1986
- Genre: Rock
- Length: 45:25
- Label: Atlantic
- Producer: John Parr

John Parr chronology
John Parr (1984)	Running the Endless Mile (1986)	Man With a Vision (1992)

Singles from Running the Endless Mile
- 1. "Two Hearts" Released: 22 May 1986; 2. "Running the Endless Mile" Released: 1986 (EU); 3. "Blame It on the Radio" Released: 1986 (US); 4. "Don't Worry 'Bout Me" Released: 1987

Professional ratings
Review scores
Source	Rating
AllMusic	3/5 stars
Kerrang!	5/5 stars
Sounds	3/5 stars

Running the Endless Mile is the second album by John Parr, released in 1986. The lead single "Blame It on the Radio" reached U.S. #88, the only song to reach the U.S. singles charts. The first track on the album, "Two Hearts", was taken from the soundtrack to the film American Anthem. However, an earlier soundtrack hit, Parr's #1 hit of the previous summer "St. Elmo's Fire (Man in Motion)" from the film of the same title (and also on the Atlantic label) was not included on this album, which may have limited its sales (the album failed to crack the Top 200 in the U.S.). Instead, a song that was on his first album, "Don't Leave Your Mark on Me" was repeated in a different version.

== Background ==
Running the Endless Mile was recorded in various studios over a period of five months in 1986. Parr told Billboard in 1986, "I needed to have an album out this year because it's been two years since my last one. The only way to do it was in between promotion and gigs in Europe. So wherever I wrote, I recorded at the same time."

== Critical reception ==
Upon its release, Paul Elliott of Sounds described the album as "good radio rock" and "great for tapping a steering wheel to", although he noted that sometimes the "clichés can at times run thick". He added that "every now and again, John lets his hair down", providing a "welcome diversion from meat 'n' potatoes AOR".

== Track listing ==
All songs written by John Parr unless noted.

1. "Two Hearts (American Anthem)" - 6:09
2. "Don't Worry 'Bout Me" - 4:05
3. "King of Lies" - 4:08
4. "Running the Endless Mile" - 4:19
5. "Don't Leave Your Mark on Me (Mark 2)" (Julia Downes, Parr) - 4:19
6. "Scratch" - 4:39
7. "Do It Again" - 4:08
8. "Blame It on the Radio" - 4:16
9. "The Story Still Remains the Same (Vices)" (Downes, Parr) - 3:52
10. "Steal You Away (Flight of the Spruce Goose)" - 5:30

== Personnel ==
- John Parr - lead vocals, guitar, keyboards
- Pete Bonas - guitar
- Craig Jones - guitar
- Michael Landau - guitar
- Christopher Marra - guitar
- Bruce Laing - bass
- Brad Lang - bass
- Steve Bodicker - keyboards
- John Cook - keyboards
- Richard Cottle - keyboards
- Julia Downes - keyboards
- Randy Kerber - keyboards
- Tony Mitman - keyboards
- Neil Richmond - synthesizer, programming
- Peter-John Vettese - keyboards
- Martin Dobson - saxophone
- Jerry Hey - trumpet
- Tony Beard - drums
- Graham Broad - drums, percussion
- Peter Hammond - drums, percussion, engineer
- Jeff Porcaro - drums, percussion
- Roddy Matthews - backing vocals
- Lee Matty - backing vocals
- Chuck Kirkpatrick - backing vocals
- Gareth Mortimer - backing vocals
- Gill O'Donovan - backing vocals
- John Sambataro - backing vocals
- Karen Sambrooke - backing vocals
- Chris Thompson - backing vocals
- Marty Thompson - backing vocals
- Will Gosling - engineer
