= Rick Avery =

American actor

- Born: New York City, New York, U.S.
- Occupations: Stuntman, actor, director
- Years active: 1980–present
- Known for: acting, authoring, movie directing

Rick Avery is an American stuntman, stunt coordinator, actor, director and author. He has worked on more than 400 films and television projects, including The Crow, The Prestige, The Dark Knight Rises, Gangster Squad, and American Sniper. He is also notable for having doubled for Robert De Niro, Dustin Hoffman, Richard Gere and John Travolta.

Rick is the author of his memoir, A Life at Risk.

== Life and career ==
Rick was a Sergeant in the U.S. Army, and a Santa Barbara Metro Police Officer. He has three children; Dianne, Brian, and Mike, his sons also work as stunt performers. He is also a four-time master's world boxing champion.

Rick's directorial credits include The Expert and Deadly Outbreak, both released in 1995. His acting credits include Heat, Edge of Darkness, Ant-Man and Hands of Stone.

== Filmography ==
| Year | Title | Stunts | Second unit director | Director |
|---|---|---|---|---|
| 1989 | L.A. Takedown | Yes | No | Michael Mann |
| 1990 | Men at Work | Yes | No | Emilio Estevez |
| 1991 | Night of the Warrior | Yes | Yes | Rafal Zielinski |
| 1992 | Batman Returns | Yes | No | Tim Burton |
| 1993 | Street Knight | Yes | Yes | Albert Magnoli |
| 1993 | Hot Shots! Part Deux | Yes | No | Jim Abrahams |
| 1993 | Killing Zoe | Yes | No | Roger Avery |
| 1994 | The Crow | Yes | No | Alex Proyas |
| 1994 | Beverly Hills Cop III | Yes | No | John Landis |
| 1995 | Casino | Yes | No | Martin Scorsese |
| 1995 | Money Train | Yes | No | Joseph Ruben |
| 1995 | Heat | Yes | No | Michael Mann |
| 1996 | Independence Day | Yes | No | Roland Emmerich |
| 1996 | Escape from L.A. | Yes | No | John Carpenter |
| 1997 | L.A. Confidential | Yes | No | Curtis Hanson |
| 1997 | Titanic | Yes | No | James Cameron |
| 1998 | BASEketball | Yes | No | David Zucker |
| 1998 | Blues Brothers 2000 | Yes | No | John Landis |
| 1998 | Finding Graceland | Yes | Yes | David Winkler |
| 1999 | Two Shades of Blue | Yes | Yes | James D. Deck |
| 2000 | Scream 3 | Yes | Yes | Wes Craven |
| 2000 | Traffic | Yes | No | Steven Soderbergh |
| 2000 | Erin Brockovich | Yes | No | Steven Soderbergh |
| 2000 | Dude, Where's My Car? | Yes | No | Danny Leiner |
| 2001 | Ocean's Eleven | Yes | No | Steven Soderbergh |
| 2001 | The Animal | Yes | No | Luke Greenfield |
| 2002 | Clockstoppers | Yes | Yes | Jonathan Frakes |
| 2002 | Orange County | Yes | No | Jake Kasdan |
| 2002 | The Sweetest Thing | Yes | Yes | Roger Kumble |
| 2002 | John Q. | Yes | No | Nick Cassavetes |
| 2003 | Identity | Yes | Yes | James Mangold |
| 2003 | The Italian Job | Yes | No | F. Gary Gray |
| 2004 | Taxi | Yes | No | Tim Story |
| 2004 | Meet the Fockers | Yes | No | Jay Roach |
| 2004 | Anchorman: The Legend of Ron Burgundy | Yes | Yes | Adam McKay |
| 2004 | Wake Up, Ron Burgundy: The Lost Movie | Yes | Yes | Adam McKay |
| 2004 | The Whole Ten Yards | Yes | No | Howard Deutch |
| 2005 | Batman Begins | Yes | No | Christopher Nolan |
| 2005 | Cursed | No | Yes | Wes Craven |
| 2005 | Walk the Line | Yes | No | James Mangold |
| 2005 | Elizabethtown | Yes | No | Cameron Crowe |
| 2006 | Date Movie | Yes | No | Jason Friedberg and Aaron Seltzer |
| 2006 | World Trade Center | Yes | No | Oliver Stone |
| 2006 | Tenacious D in The Pick of Destiny | Yes | Yes | Liam Lynch |
| 2006 | The Prestige | Yes | No | Christopher Nolan |
| 2006 | Smokin' Aces | Yes | No | Joe Carnahan |
| 2007 | Charlie Wilson's War | Yes | Yes | Mike Nichols |
| 2007 | Ocean's Thirteen | Yes | No | Steven Soderbergh |
| 2008 | Superhero Movie | Yes | No | Craig Mazin |
| 2008 | Get Smart | Yes | No | Peter Segal |
| 2008 | The Dark Knight | Yes | No | Christopher Nolan |
| 2008 | Frost/Nixon | Yes | No | Ron Howard |
| 2010 | Edge of Darkness | Yes | No | Martin Campbell |
| 2011 | Captain America: The First Avenger | Yes | No | Joe Johnston |
| 2012 | Journey 2: The Mysterious Island | Yes | No | Brad Peyton |
| 2012 | Men in Black 3 | Yes | No | Barry Sonnenfeld |
| 2012 | The Dark Knight Rises | Yes | No | Christopher Nolan |
| 2013 | Gangster Squad | Yes | No | Ruben Fleischer |
| 2014 | American Sniper | Yes | No | Clint Eastwood |
| 2015 | Ant-Man | Yes | No | Peyton Reed |
| 2016 | Hands of Stone | Yes | Yes | Jonathan Jakubowicz |
| 2017 | Dunkirk | Yes | No | Christopher Nolan |
| 2018 | Bumblebee | Yes | No | Travis Knight |

== Awards and nominations ==
| Year | Result | Award | Category | Work |
|---|---|---|---|---|
| 2001 | Won | Screen Actors Guild Award | Outstanding Performance by a Cast in a Motion Picture | Traffic |
| 2009 | Won | Screen Actors Guild Award | SAG Award for Best Stunt Ensemble | The Dark Knight |
| 2009 | Won | Taurus World Stunt Awards | Best Work With a Vehicle | The Dark Knight |
