= American Anthem =

1986 film by Albert Magnoli

- Theatrical release poster
- Directed by: Albert Magnoli
- Screenplay by: Evan Archerd; Jeff Benjamin
- Story by: Susan Williams
- Produced by: Doug Chapin
- Starring: Mitch Gaylord; Janet Jones
- Cinematography: Donald E. Thorin
- Edited by: Jim Oliver
- Music by: Alan Silvestri
- Production company: Lorimar Motion Pictures
- Distributed by: Columbia Pictures
- Release date: June 27, 1986
- Running time: 102 minutes
- Country: United States
- Language: English
- Budget: $7 million
- Box office: $4,845,724

American Anthem is a 1986 American sports drama film directed by Albert Magnoli, starring Mitch Gaylord and Janet Jones. The film was produced by Lorimar Motion Pictures and released in North America by Columbia Pictures. Gaylord was a member of the gold medal-winning U.S. men's gymnastics team at the 1984 Summer Olympics.

== Plot ==
Steve Tevere, a football player turned gymnast, seeks to join the United States Olympic gymnastics team.

== Cast ==
- Mitch Gaylord as Steve Tevere
- Tiny Wells as Jake
- Janet Jones as Julie Lloyd
- Michael Pataki as Coach Soranhoff
- Patrice Donnelly as Danielle
- R.J. Williams as Mikey Tevere
- John Aprea as Mr. Tevere
- Michelle Phillips as Linda Tevere
- Kathrine Godney as Landlady
- Stacy Maloney as Kirk Baker
- Peter Tramm as Ron Denver
- Maria Anz as Becky Cameron
- Jenny Ester as Tracy Prescott
- Andrew White as Arthur
- Dick McGarvin as Announcer Prelim Meet
- Mark Oates as Danny Squire
- Jan Claire as Announcer Final Meet
- Megan Marsden as Jo-Ellen Carter
- Li Yuejiu as Ling Xiang
- Googy Gress as Alan Cole

== Soundtrack ==
The soundtrack was released on CD, LP and cassette by Atlantic Records. The album contains songs by various artists, including two themes from the film, composed and conducted by Alan Silvestri.

1. Two Hearts - John Parr (6:07)
2. Run to Her - Mr. Mister (3:34)
3. Same Direction - INXS (5:08)
4. Battle of the Dragon - Stevie Nicks (5:15)
5. Wings to Fly - Graham Nash (4:00)
6. Take It Easy - Andy Taylor (4:22)
7. Wings of Love - Andy Taylor (5:03)
8. Love and Loneliness - Chris Thompson (5:03)
9. Angel Eyes - Andy Taylor (3:26)
10. Arthur's Theme - Alan Silvestri (2:50)
11. Julie's Theme - Alan Silvestri (1:42)

== Reception ==
The film was a box office flop, grossing only $4.8 million against a $7 million budget.

The film received aggressively negative reviews by critics, especially from famed critics Gene Siskel and Roger Ebert; with the latter saying the film was "as bad as any movie I've seen [in 1986], and so inept that not even the gymnastics scenes are interesting" and the former calling the film "complete junk; you can see more interesting gymnastics on Wide World of Sports than in this garbage". Ebert opened his print review by writing:

"American Anthem" is like a very bad Identikit sketch of Purple Rain the previous movie by the same director. You can almost hear the police artist as he tries to make his drawing, based on half-witted descriptions of the big hit from the summer of 1984:

Q. Who is the star?
A. A major superstar in another field who has never acted before.
Q. What is his personal crisis?
A. He has an unhappy homelife and a father who mistreats him.
Q. What is the suspense?
A. Will he conquer his inner demons and perform once again at the peak of his ability?
Q. Who is his girlfriend?
A. A future star in his field whose excellence inspires him to start trying again.
Q. What's the movie's visual style?
A. Kind of a cross between a concert film and an MTV video. Be sure to overedit. And put in lots of shots where the camera peers into the light source, so the heroic youth can be seen in silhouette as he tosses back his head and sweat flies through the air.

With this incomplete description, a filmmaker from Planet X might have made American Anthem from the basic ingredients of Purple Rain. The hero this time is not a rock star like Prince, but a gymnast played by the Olympic champion Mitch Gaylord. But since the movie treats him like a rock star, photographing him not as a sweating, breathing, striving athlete but as a pinup for the girls' locker room, the difference isn't as big as you might imagine.

Patrick Goldstein of the Los Angeles Times remarked:

Years from now (in a galaxy far away), some weary film historian will look back at teen movies of the ‘80s and wonder--what was with those kids anyway? So young, so gifted, so muscular and beautiful--and yet so messed up. So in need of inspiration, of goals, of parents that understand them. So in need of . . . a good script. If you’ve seen Flashdance and Purple Rain, if you’ve seen ravishing, loose-limbed bodies pulsing to a thunderous rock beat, then you’ve got a pretty good idea of the main ingredients in American Anthem (citywide), a dim-witted film that attempts feebly to breathe some life into the story of a young gymnast’s bumpy quest for success. Directed by Albert Magnoli (Purple Rain), this film reminds us only how much these rock-drenched teen dreams need the presence of an incandescent performer like Prince to add a shower of sparks to an otherwise dreary, predictable celebration of teen angst.

American Anthem currently holds a 0% rating on Rotten Tomatoes based on sixteen reviews, with an average rating of 2.5/10. Audiences polled by CinemaScore gave the film an average grade of "B-" on an A+ to F scale.

== Accolades ==
Gaylord's performance in the film earned him a nomination for the Golden Raspberry Award for Worst New Star, where he lost to "the six guys and gals in the duck suit" from Howard the Duck at the 7th Golden Raspberry Awards.
