= Seven (band) =

- Left to right: Austin Lane (drums), Simon Lefevre (keyboards/vocals), Mick Devine (lead vocals), Pat Davey (bass guitar/vocals) and Keith McFarlane (guitar/vocals).

Background information
- Origin: Bournemouth, England
- Genres: AOR, rock
- Years active: 1989–1990, 2014–
- Labels: Polydor, Escape Music

Seven is an English AOR band formed in Bournemouth in the 1990s, who recorded two singles with Polydor Records both having minor success within the UK. In 2014 a tribute album of the original unreleased material was released to critical acclaim, followed two years later by a studio album of new material.

== History ==
The band formed in 1989, consisting of Mick Devine (lead vocals), Keith McFarlane (guitar/vocals), Pat Davey (bass guitar/vocals), Simon Lefevre (keyboards/vocals) and Austin Lane (drums).

The band formed from the remnants of the South African band "Face to Face". McFarlane and LeFevre (including his brother John LeFevre) found considerable success with "Face to Face" over a period of 18 months. The band went on and released a number of singles and one album, before the band split up. At the same time Devine was playing drums in the band UC27. When McFarlane and the LeFevre brothers returned to the UK, it was decided that the band should be bought back again, but within the UK. Devine left South Africa, without having met the trio beforehand, and the band were first based in Woking. The band met their original manager Mike Parker at a talent show, and after this the band relocated to Bournemouth. Devine was initially planned to be the band's drummer after being approached by John LeFevre. However the group considered Devine a better singer and bought in Ross Elliot on drums, Devine then became lead vocalist. The band in this format had success on local radio (2Cr) and a performance on national TV, Ross Elliot Departed to further his career in London. The band then changed their name to Seven. Devine was originally the National Skateboard Champion.

Mike Parker engaged Mark Eden (Misty Studio, Bournemouth) to work extensively on recording demos with the band and when he was subsequently recruited to help John Parr build his home studio 'Somewhere in Yorkshire' following the global success of 'St Elmos Fire', Parker calls in a favour and asked him to play the SEVEN demos to Parr and his manager John Wolff. Parr thought the band have the potential to become a young version of Def Leppard. A studio production deal was struck and in return Parker agreed to co-management of SEVEN by Wolff. Together the management secured a support slot on the first nationwide tour of Brother Beyond. During this time the band built up live experience and a sizeable fan base. Soon after the band attracted the attention of Phillip Schofield and a record executive's wife. Schofield began playing the band's demos on Radio One, and expressed his wishes for the band to record another demo. Within this same period the band were on tour when they found themselves signing a deal with Polydor Records. The wife and children of the head of Polydor had watched one of the shows, and she returned home to tell her husband that he needed to sign the group. This combined with the band's touring, fan base and Schofield's support on radio, led the band to sign a contract. As an attempt to create some media hype, Schofield was on hand as witness of the record deal signing. In 1989/1990, Seven were backing band for two Brother Beyond tours and Jason Donavan. They also toured with The Monkees, and with Richard Marx.

When the band entered the recording studio under the production deal with Bogus Global (Parr & Wolff's company), UK musician, producer and songwriter John Parr recorded two singles which were licensed to Polydor. The band released their first single in January 1990, titled "Inside Love" which was produced by Parr and written by both Keith McFarlane and Simon LeFevre. The song had a promotional video. The b-side was titled "Till Then" which was produced by Tim Lewis and Mike Parker, written again by McFarlane and LeFevre. "Inside Love" peaked at No. 78 in the UK Singles Chart, lasting a total of four weeks on the chart.

For the follow-up single, released in June 1990, the band released the song "Man With a Vision", produced again by Parr and written by Parr, McFarlane and Lefevre. The song also had a promotional video. The single's two b-side were titled "Just Close Your Eyes" and "Stranger (In The Night)". "Man With a Vision" peaked at No. 91 on the UK Singles Chart, spending two weeks on the chart. Parr himself would later record his own version of the song for his 1992 album of the same name Man With a Vision. Parr would also release his version as a single.

The band recorded other demo songs, such as "Until Then" and "Be That Girl", however a series of internal struggles and arguments meant that the band soon split. Over the years rumours developed that the band had recorded a full album that was shelved by Polydor, after they were dropped for the label. However the band never had an album deal, and were only licensed to Polydor for the two single releases. The band did have more than an album's worth of material, and these were largely good-quality demos which were recorded at various studios, including a number of weeks at Rockfield.

In recent years, Lane manages the Drum Dept at Absolute Music, Poole, whilst both McFarlane and Lefevre returned to South Africa, Devine moved to Market Harborough and Davey settled in Bournemouth, teaching bass in Bournemouth and Poole College and performing regularly with several jazz bands. When Davey worked alongside Robert Hart on an album for the British rock label Escape Music, the band came up in conversation, which revealed that Khalil Turk was a big fan. He soon got in touch with the band's members to ask if they were interested in releasing an album with the original line-up. As both McFarlane and Lefevre remain in South Africa, Turk decided to team the band up with Swedish hard rock guitarist and producer Lars Chris. The band's debut album, titled Seven, was released on 20 June 2014 through Escape Music. It was followed by a studio album of new material in 2016 called Shattered, with Mick Devine as the only remaining original member. Lead Singer Mick Devine also subsequently releases his first solo album 'Hear Now'again via Escape Music on 18/10/2019.

== Past members ==
- Keith McFarlane (guitar/vocals)
- Pat Davey (bass guitar/vocals)
- Simon Lefevre (keyboards/vocals)
- Austin Lane (drums); died 2023

== Discography ==
=== Studio albums ===
- 7 (2014)
- Shattered (2016)

=== Singles ===
- "Inside Love" (1990)
- "Man With a Vision" (1990)
