= Donald E. Thorin =

American cinematographer

- Born: Donald Eugene Thorin; October 12, 1934; Omaha, Nebraska, U.S.
- Died: February 9, 2016 (aged 81); Tucson, Arizona, U.S.
- Education: Creighton University
- Years active: 1958–2003
- Organization: American Society of Cinematographers

Donald Eugene Thorin, ASC (October 12, 1934 – February 9, 2016) was an American cinematographer.

== Early life ==
Thorin was born in Omaha, Nebraska, and graduated from Creighton University.

In 1957, he went to Hollywood and started working as mailroom at 20th Century Fox. He later moved to camera department as camera loader, and started his cinematographer career from the 2nd camera assistant on The Young Lions (1958).

He also worked as a commercial desginer.

== Career ==
During the 1970s, Thorin worked as a camera operator for notable cinematographers like Richard H. Kline, Jordan Cronenweth, Haskell Wexler, Owen Roizman and Gordon Willis.

His first feature film as cinematographer was Thief (1981), which also marked the directorial debut of director Michael Mann. Thorin's slick, neo-noir photography was singled out in praise by critics at the time.

He joined the American Society of Cinematographers in 1986.

== Personal life and death ==
Throin was married to his wife Dagmar for over 40 years. He was the father of cinematographer and TV director Donald E. Thorin Jr. (born 1957), and camera operator Jeffrey Thorin (born 1961).

Aged 81, Thorin died in Tucson, Arizona on February 9, 2016.

== Filmography ==
Year	Title	Director	Notes
1981	Thief	Michael Mann	
1982	An Officer and a Gentleman	Taylor Hackford	
1983	Bad Boys	Rick Rosenthal	With Bruce Surtees
1984	Against All Odds	Taylor Hackford	
1984	Purple Rain	Albert Magnoli	
1985	Mischief	Mel Damski	
1986	Wildcats	Michael Ritchie	
1986	American Anthem	Albert Magnoli	
1986	The Golden Child	Michael Ritchie	
1988	The Couch Trip	Michael Ritchie	
1988	Midnight Run	Martin Brest	
1989	Troop Beverly Hills	Jeff Kanew	
1989	Collision Course	Lewis Teague	
1989	Lock Up	John Flynn	
1989	Tango & Cash	Andrei Konchalovsky	
1991	The Marrying Man	Jerry Rees	
1992	Out on a Limb	Francis Veber	
1992	Scent of a Woman	Martin Brest	
1993	Undercover Blues	Herbert Ross	
1994	Little Big League	Andrew Scheinman	
1994	Extra Terrorestrial Alien Encounter	Jerry Rees	Short film
1995	Boys on the Side	Herbert Ross	
1995	Ace Ventura: When Nature Calls	Steve Oedekerk	Also second unit director: Canada
1996	The First Wives Club	Hugh Wilson	
1997	Nothing to Lose	Steve Oedekerk	
1999	Mickey Blue Eyes	Kelly Makin	
1999	Dudley Do-Right	Hugh Wilson	
2000	Shaft	John Singleton	
2003	Head of State	Chris Rock	
