= Restless Heart (disambiguation) =

Restless Heart is an American country music band.

Restless Heart may also refer to:

== Film ==
- Restless Heart: The Confessions of Saint Augustine or Augustine: The Decline of the Roman Empire, a 2010 Italian-German television film
- Restless Hearts, a 1928 German-Spanish silent film
- Dil Hai Betaab (lit. 'Restless Heart'), a 1993 Indian Hindi-language romantic drama film starring Ajay Devgn

== Music ==
- Restless Heart (Paul Field album) or the title song, 1982
- Restless Heart (Restless Heart album) or the title song, 1985
- Restless Heart (Whitesnake album) or the title song, 1997
- "Restless Heart" (John Parr song), 1988
- "Restless Heart" (Peter Cetera song), 1992
- "Restless Heart", a song by Jerry Lee Lewis from Young Blood, 1995
