= Crystal Eye =

Crystal Eye(s) may refer to:

- Crystal Eye, item in American television series Power Rangers Jungle Fury
- "Crystal Eye", single by the English singer/musician John Parr in his song "Restless Heart"
- Crystal Eye (Adventure Time), item in American television series Adventure Time
- "Crystal Eyes", track by American glam metal band L.A. Guns in the album Hollywood Vampires
- Crystal Eyes, Swedish power metal band

== See also ==
- Eyes of Crystal, 2004 international co-production thriller film
