= Blame It on the Radio =

Single by John Parr

from the album Running the Endless Mile
- B-side: "Two Hearts"
- Released: 1986
- Genre: Pop/Rock
- Length: 4:17
- Label: Atlantic Records
- Songwriter(s): John Parr
- Producer(s): John Parr

John Parr singles chronology
"Two Hearts" (1986)	"Blame It on the Radio" (1986)	"Don't Worry 'Bout Me" (1987)

"Blame It on the Radio" is a song by English singer/musician John Parr, released in 1986 as the lead single from his second studio album Running the Endless Mile. It was written and produced by Parr, and reached No. 88 on the US Billboard Hot 100. It remained on the charts for six weeks and became Parr's last entry on the chart.

== Release ==
"Blame It on the Radio" was released on 7" vinyl by Atlantic Records in the United States and Japan only. The B-side, "Two Hearts", also appeared on Running the Endless Mile. A promotional 7" vinyl was also issued in the US, with "Blame It on the Radio" on both sides of the vinyl. The single's artwork used the same photo of Parr as on the Running the Endless Mile cover, but zoomed in for a closer shot of his face.

== Promotion ==
A music video was filmed to promote the single. It was directed by Meiert Avis and produced by Paul Spencer for Midnight Films Ltd. It achieved medium rotation on MTV. On 6 December 1986, Parr performed the song on the 293rd episode of the American syndicated music television series Solid Gold.

== Critical reception ==
Billboard described "Blame It on the Radio" as "cheerful, strutting AOR pop". Dave Sholin, writing for the Gavin Report, commented: "Just what you'd expect from a guy who knows how to make records for the radio. Parr stays on the commercial course with a song that'll have 'em singing along after about sixty seconds." AllMusic picked the song as an album stand-out track by highlighting it as an AMG Pick Track.

== Track listing ==
7" single

1. "Blame It on the Radio" (LP Version) - 4:17
2. "Two Hearts" (LP Version) - 6:06

7" single (US promo)

1. "Blame It on the Radio" - 4:16
2. "Blame It on the Radio" - 4:16

== Personnel ==
- John Parr - lead vocals, producer
- Chris Marra - guitar
- John Cooke, Peter-John Vettese - keyboards
- Brad Lang - bass
- Graham Broad - drums, percussion
- Tony Taverner - engineer
- Steve Rook - mastering

== Charts ==
=== Weekly charts ===
Chart (1986–1987)	Peak position
Italy Airplay (Music & Media)	11
US Billboard Hot 100	88
