= Inside Love =

Single by Seven
- B-side: "Till Then"
- Released: January 1990
- Recorded: 1989
- Length: 3:53
- Label: Polydor
- Songwriter(s): Keith McFarlane; Simon LeFevre
- Producer(s): John Parr

Seven singles chronology
"Inside Love" (1990)	"Man With a Vision" (1990)

"Inside Love" is the debut single by the British band Seven, released by Polydor in 1990. It was written by band members Keith McFarlane and Simon LeFevre, and was produced by John Parr. "Inside Love" reached number 78 in the UK Singles Chart and remained in the top 100 for four weeks.

Seven had secured a contract with Polydor in 1989 and they produced two singles for the label, "Inside Love" and "Man With a Vision", both of which were produced by John Parr. The limited commercial success of the singles led to the band being dropped by Polydor and subsequently splitting. In 2014, the original line-up reunited and released their self-titled debut album that year through Escape Music. It included a re-recorded version of "Inside Love".

== Critical reception ==
Upon its release, Steve Duffy of the South Wales Echo gave "Inside Love" a one out of five star rating and wrote, "Thoroughly bland pop/rock, looking for a personality. You can spot the inevitable guitar solo long before it arrives."

== Formats ==
7-inch single

1. "Inside Love" – 3:53
2. "Till Then" – 3:51

12-inch single

1. "Inside Love" (Extended Version) – 6:46
2. "Inside Love" – 3:53
3. "Till Then" – 3:51

CD single

1. "Inside Love" – 3:53
2. "Till Then" – 3:51
3. "Inside Love" (Extended Version) – 6:46

== Personnel ==
Seven

- Mick Devine – lead vocals
- Keith Macfarlane – guitar, backing vocals
- Pat Davey – bass guitar, backing vocals
- Simon Lefevre – keyboards, backing vocals
- Austin Lane – drums

Production

- John Parr – production ("Inside Love")
- Tim Lewis – production ("Till Then")
- Mike Parker – production ("Till Then")
- John Spence – engineer ("Inside Love")
- Stephen W Taylor – remixing ("Inside Love")

Other

- Paul Cox – photography
- Stylorouge – design

== Charts ==
Chart (1990)	Peak position
UK Singles Chart	78
