= Under Parr =

Studio album by John Parr
- Released: 13 September 1996
- Genre: Rock
- Length: 53:22
- Label: Kiosk
- Producers: John Parr (tracks 1, 3-11); Frank Langer (tracks 2, 10, 12); David McKay (tracks 6 11); Alan Roy Scott (as co-producer, tracks 2, 12)

John Parr chronology
Man With a Vision (1992)	Under Parr (1996)	Letter to America (2011)

Under Parr is the fourth studio album by John Parr, released in 1996.

== Background ==
Under Parr was released four years after Parr's last studio album Man With a Vision, which had seen a small amount of chart success in Europe. Similarly, Under Parr was only released in certain countries within Europe through the record labels Blue Martin and K-Tel International (Switzerland) AG. The album and its three singles, "The River Runs Deep," "Size of the Boat" and "Secrets", received little promotion and did not generate any commercial success. Under Parr was recorded in various recording studios at London, New York and Los Angeles. It was mastered at Greenwood Studios. At the time of the album, Parr was suffering a long legal battle, and after the failure of Under Parr, he decided to spend time away from the music industry. He wouldn't release his next album until 2011.

Speaking to the webzine Get Ready to Rock! in 2011, Parr revealed of the album and that period of his career:

"I was dead in the water long before Under Parr. From the nineties onwards I was locked in the litigation. All my income was frozen for almost twenty years so I had to really bob and weave. Man with a Vision was really a bunch of demos but as there were no deals on the table I was forced to release it through Blue Martin a small label in Switzerland. Even though we had very little exposure due to the court case, they invested in Under Parr. I told them not to unless they could afford to promote it properly. In the end they spent a ton of money making the record and had little left to promote it. I walked away from music for the next ten years. It broke my heart. I was making records that only my family and friends heard - some of my best work I think, that nobody was going to hear. The guitar stayed untouched in the box for ten years and I never sang a note."

== Release ==
In Germany, the album was released by Bud Music. This release was licensed from K-Tel International (Switzerland) AG, distrusted by Kiosk Audio Video Cassetten GmbH. Three singles were released from the album: "The River Runs Deep," "Size of the Boat" and "Secrets". "The River Runs Deep" was released in 1994 in Germany and included a non-album track "A Few Good Men". "Size of the Boat" was released in Germany in 1996 and included two non-album tracks "Time II" and "Out of Faze (Instrumental)".

As the album, including the Man with a Vision, did not receive a UK release, both albums were later released together circa 2010 in the UK and Europe as a two-disc CD set compilation, under the title Man in Motion. In 2011, Parr released a double album titled Letter to America which featured various previous material and some new recordings. "Time" and "Secrets" from Under Parr were included.

== Critical reception ==
On its release in 1994, Music & Media described "The River Runs Deep" as "a rock song on a Motown beat". The reviewer felt the song "will prevent Parr's well of hits [from] running dry" and considered it to be "on par" with Parr's 1985 hit "St. Elmo's Fire (Man in Motion)".

== Track listing ==
No.	Title	Writer(s)	Length
1.	"Bad Blood"	John Parr	5:23
2.	"Ball and Chain"	Frank Langer, Alan Roy Scott	4:42
3.	"Secrets"	Parr	5:40
4.	"Makin' Love to Your Answer Machine"	Parr	5:12
5.	"Forgiveness"	Ian Lynn, Alison Taylor, Parr	0:54
6.	"We All Make Mistakes"	Parr, David MacKay	3:29
7.	"Time"	Parr	5:04
8.	"Hours, Minutes and Sex"	Parr	5:29
9.	"4 Letter Word"	Parr	4:34
10.	"Family Tree"	Langer, Parr	4:36
11.	"It Ain't the Size of the Boat"	Parr, MacKay	4:22
12.	"The River Runs Deep"	Langer, Scott	3:57

== Personnel ==
- John Parr - Vocals (all tracks), Guitar (tracks 6, 8, 11), Producer (tracks 1, 3–11), Engineer (track 1, 3–4, 7–9, 11)
- David McKay - Producer (tracks 6, 11), Mixing (tracks 5–6, 11), Engineer (tracks 6, 11)
- Frank Langer - Producer (tracks 2, 10, 12), Backing Vocals (track 10)
- Alan Roy Scott - Co-producer (tracks 2, 12)
- John Spence - Engineer (tracks 1, 3–4, 7–10), Mixing (tracks 1, 4, 9–10)
- Larry Mah - Engineer (track 2)
- Bob Wartinbee, Steve Shepherd, Vincent Collucci - Engineers (tracks 2, 12)
- Chris Lord-Alge - Mixing (tracks 2, 12)
- Robin Prior - Engineer (tracks 3, 7–8)
- Tony Philpott - Engineer (tracks 3, 5, 7)
- Femi Jiya - Mixing (tracks 3, 7–8)
- Sandra Banks - Backing Vocals (tracks 1, 3–4, 7–10)
- Billy Trudell, Frank Langer, Ian Harrison, Jeff Pescetto, Robyn Kirmsee - Backing Vocals (track 2)
- John Verity - Backing Vocals (track 6)
- Lisa Harmond - Backing Vocals (tracks 7–9)
- Lloyd Anderson - Backing Vocals (tracks 8–9)
- Elfed Hayes, Karen Bodington, Stephanie Benvante - Backing Vocals (track 11)
- Allen Soroy, Michael Mishaw, Natisse "Bambi" Jones - Backing Vocals (track 12)
- Jim Williams - Guitar (tracks 1, 3–4, 7–9)
- Michael Thompson - Guitar (track 2, 12)
- Geoff Whitehorn - Guitar (track 6)

- Chris Marra - Guitar (track 11)
- Gerry Stephenson - Acoustic Guitar (track 6)
- Richard Cottle - Keyboards (tracks 1, 3–4, 6, 7–11), Saxophone (track 10), Horns (track 11)
- Eric Moon - Keyboards (tracks 2, 12)
- Kevin Savigar - Keyboards (tracks 7–8)
- Alan Park - Piano (track 6)
- Danny Wood - Organ (track 9)
- The London Session Orchestra - Strings (tracks 3, 5, 7)
- Alison Taylor - String Arrangement (tracks 3, 5, 7)
- Ian Lynn - String Arrangement, Conductor (tracks 3, 5, 7)
- Nigel Hitchcock - Saxophone (track 3, 7), Horns (track 9)
- Neil Sidwell, Paul Spong - Horns (track 9)
- Steve Sidwell - Horns (track 9, 11)
- The Sidwell Brothers - Horn Arrangement (track 9)
- Dave Koz - Saxophone (track 12)
- Graham Brierton - Bass (tracks 3, 9)
- Matt Bissonette - Bass (track 12)
- Graham Broad - Drums (tracks 1, 3, 7, 9)
- Mike Baird - Drums (tracks 2, 12)
- Claudia Vass - Cover Artwork Model
- Asan Can - Cover Artwork Photography
