= Seth Sakai =

American actor (1932–2007)

- Born: 1932; Hawaii, U.S.
- Died: 2007 (aged 74–75); Hawaii, U.S.

Seth Saita Sakai (1932–2007) was an American television and film actor. Sakai's roles included various characters from Hawaii Five-O and Magnum, P.I.. He also featured in the 1991 film, The Perfect Weapon.

== Filmography ==
Year	Title	Roles	Notes
1974	Inferno in Paradise	The Torch	
1976	Midway	Captain Kameto Kuroshima	
1976	Farewell to Manazanar	Joe Takahashi	
1978	Hawaii Five-O	as The General	Played various roles over many years
1979	Seven	McDowell	
1983	The Golden Seal	Semeyon	
1987	Captive Hearts	Takayama	
1991	The Perfect Weapon	Master Lo	
1994	The Next Karate Kid	Buddhist Monk	
1995	The Hunted	Dr. Otozo Yamura	
2001	Pearl Harbor	Takeo Yoshikawa	
2007	American Pastime	Nori Morita	Final film role
