= The Perfect Weapon (1991 film) =

1991 film by Mark DiSalle

- Directed by: Mark DiSalle
- Written by: David C. Wilson
- Produced by: Pierre David; Mark DiSalle
- Starring: Jeff Speakman; John Dye; Mako
- Cinematography: Russell Carpenter
- Edited by: Andrew Cohen; Wayne Wahrman
- Music by: Gary Chang
- Distributed by: Paramount Pictures
- Release date: March 15, 1991
- Running time: 87 minutes
- Language: English
- Budget: $10 million
- Box office: $14 million

The Perfect Weapon is a 1991 American martial arts action film directed by Mark DiSalle and starring Jeff Speakman, John Dye, Mako, Mariska Hargitay, James Hong, Dante Basco and Cary-Hiroyuki Tagawa. The film relates the story of a young man (Speakman), who is trained in the martial art of American Kenpo, and his fight against the Korean mafia in Los Angeles. It was released by Paramount Pictures on March 15, 1991.

== Plot ==
Jeff Sanders leads a double life. By day, he is a construction worker; by night, he is a skilled practitioner and master of American Kenpo.

Jeff's background is revealed; after losing his mother as a child, he became an outcast and frequently lashed out at his family and society in an attempt to assuage his anger. His father, Police Captain Carl Sanders, gained the idea from a mutual friend, Kim, in Koreatown, to enroll Jeff in a Kenpo school to better manage his rage and feelings. However, he lost his temper with a football player who punched his younger brother, and almost kills him. Displeased with this event, Jeff's father forced him to move out of their home. Jeff, now estranged from his family and living alone, continued with his courses in Kenpo and eventually adopted Kim as a mentor and father figure.

Jeff decides to return to his old neighborhood to visit Kim. Inside his shop, Kim is having trouble with local Korean mob families, due to his refusal to pay them off and use his antique store to peddle drugs. Jeff helps out Kim and beats up the henchmen who attacked his store. A hulking hitman from Japan named Tanaka appears and kills the lead henchman (due to his failure to force Kim to comply) by head-butting him. He later kills Kim in the same manner and although Jeff tries to chase him down, Tanaka escapes.

Jeff vows to avenge Kim's death and is determined to find out who ordered Kim's murder. He remembers a boy named Jimmy Ho who lived with Kim and tries to find him to ask if he knows about the murder. However, Jeff's estranged younger brother Adam, now a cop, is investigating the case, and warns Jeff against trying to take matters into his own hands. In his hunt, Jeff is approached by a mob boss named Yung who claims to be Kim's friend and points him to a fellow mafia boss named Sam. However, upon breaking into Sam's residence and attempting to kill him, Jimmy appears and reveals that Sam was one of Kim's closest friends and was the one who took him in for protection. Jimmy also clarifies that Yung is the one responsible for Kim's death, and was merely attempting to use Jeff as a pawn to kill his rival boss Sam.

Jeff now plans to kill Yung, but Jimmy warns him that Yung is always protected by his hit-man Tanaka. In order to get Tanaka out of the equation, Jeff asks Jimmy to falsely testify to Adam that he witnessed Tanaka murdering Kim. Jeff has plotted to have Adam arrest Tanaka so that Jeff can get Yung alone to kill him. Adam and the police eventually capture Tanaka after a long car chase, but to Jeff's dismay Yung was absent from the car. Tanaka is knocked out with a taser, but later manages to escape from the police, breaking out of the police car and injuring Adam and his colleague in the process.

Jimmy overhears that Yung plans to escape the country by boat and tells Jeff about Yung's drug factory. Now in a bigger hurry, Jeff sets out to attack Yung's drug factory, using his martial arts skills and various weapons to defeat the guards and employees protecting Yung. He eventually subdues Yung, but is attacked by Tanaka. Although Tanaka dominates most of the fight, Jeff manages to kill Tanaka by setting him on fire when he is next to a gas tank. Despite initially wanting to kill Yung, Jeff decides to capture him alive (showing he has learned self-control) and turns Yung in to his father, Captain Sanders.

Later Jeff enters the Kenpo dojo to visit his former master and a former fellow student.

== Cast ==
- Jeff Speakman as Jeff Sanders
- John Dye as Detective Adam Sanders
- Mako as Kim
- James Hong as Yung
- Mariska Hargitay as Jennifer
- Dante Basco as Jimmy Ho
- Cary-Hiroyuki Tagawa as Kai
- Professor Toru Tanaka as Tanaka
- Seth Sakai as Master Lo
- Beau Starr as Captain Carl Sanders
- Clyde Kusatsu as Detective Wong
- Craig Ng as "Ponytail"
- John Koyama as "Porsch"
- Roger Yuan as "Diamond"
- Ralph Ahn as Gi
- James Lew as "Crewcut"
- Chris Tashima as Bagman

== Production ==
The Perfect Weapon was the solo directing debut of Mark DiSalle, a producer of the martial arts film Bloodsport. As of 2026, it is his last directorial effort.

The film includes American Kenpo (sometimes called Kenpo Karate), a hybrid martial art derived primarily from Japanese karate, judo, and Western-style boxing. Lead actor Jeff Speakman was a student of and was advised by Ed Parker in the making of this film, and the character Master Lo (played by Seth Sakai) is modeled on Parker. Parker offered to play the role himself, but the producers didn't believe he was a strong enough actor. Rick Avery was the film's fight choreographer.

The original cut of the film featured a romantic subplot between Jeff Speakman and Mariska Hargitay's characters, but these were cut from the theatrical release. The scenes were restored for some TV airings.

The hit 1990s song "The Power" by Eurodance rap group Snap! is featured extensively in the movie's soundtrack.

== Box office ==
The Perfect Weapon debuted at the box office at number six with a three-day box-office take of $3.9 million and had a total domestic box office gross of $14,061,361.

== Reception ==
The film was met with mixed reviews. Kevin Thomas of the Los Angeles Times wrote that the film "moves well, and its many action and martial sequences are crisply staged. But unless you are a die-hard martial-arts fan, be prepared to be thoroughly bored by such a strictly by-the-numbers plot." Rita Kemply wrote in The Washington Post that "Speakman, who studied under grand master Ed Parker, is introducing not only himself but the kenpo form to the screen. A fourth-degree black belt, he performs his own stunts, and that's important, as The Perfect Weapon is basically one long stunt." Stephen Holden of The New York Times described it as "a macho fantasy of physical control, grace and invincibility in which women are all but absent", adding:

In keeping with the genre, Mr. Speakman, who has a carefully groomed chin full of stubble throughout the film, emerges remarkably unscathed from battles in which he often floors three or four antagonists in a matter of seconds. Fighting that is as balletic and nonvisceral as the tussles portrayed in "The Perfect Weapon," which was directed by Mark DiSalle, quickly becomes a bore. By far the most gripping scene in the movie is a car chase.

On Rotten Tomatoes, it has a 42% approval rating based on 12 reviews.

== Home media ==
The Perfect Weapon was released on February 14, 2012, on DVD and Blu-ray Disc.

Kino Lorber released Blu-ray on June 4, 2024, featuring a HD Master from a 4K scan of the 35mm Original Camera Negative.
