= Slapstick (novel) =

1976 novel by Kurt Vonnegut

- Cover of first edition (hardcover)
- Author: Kurt Vonnegut
- Language: English
- Genre: Science fiction, absurdist fiction
- Publisher: Delacorte Press
- Publication date: 1976
- Publication place: United States
- Media type: Print (hardcover & paperback)
- ISBN: 0-385-28944-8

Slapstick, or Lonesome No More! is a novel by American author Kurt Vonnegut. Written in 1976, it depicts Vonnegut's views of loneliness, both on an individual and social scale.

== Explanation of title ==
Slapstick is dedicated to Arthur Stanley Jefferson and Norvell Hardy (better known as Laurel and Hardy), and the title of the novel is in reference to the physical and situational comedy style that duo employed. Vonnegut explains the title himself in the opening lines of the book's prologue:

"This is the closest I will ever come to writing an autobiography. I have called it "Slapstick" because it is grotesque, situational poetry -- like the slapstick film comedies, especially those of Laurel and Hardy, of long ago. It is about what life feels like to me."

== Plot introduction ==
The novel is in the form of an autobiography of Dr. Wilbur Daffodil-11 Swain. Dr. Swain tells us that he lives in the ruins of the Empire State Building with his pregnant granddaughter, Melody Oriole-2 von Peterswald, and her lover, Isadore Raspberry-19 Cohen. Dr. Swain is a hideous man whose ugliness, along with that of his twin sister Eliza, led their parents to cut them off from modern society. The siblings came to realize that, when in close physical contact, they form a vastly powerful and creative intelligence. Through reading and philosophizing together, Wilbur and Eliza combated the feelings of loneliness and isolation that would otherwise have ruined their childhood.

Throughout the book, Wilbur claims that his sister Eliza is the more intelligent of the two, but that no one realizes it because she can't read or write. Wilbur and Eliza are like two halves of a brain, with Wilbur the left brain—logical, rational, able to communicate—and Eliza the right brain: creative, emotional, but unable to communicate effectively.

The siblings created, among other things, a plan to end loneliness in America through vast extended families. Under the plan, all citizens would be provided with new middle names, made of the name of a random natural object paired with a random number between 1 and 20. Everyone with the same name would be cousins, and everyone with the same name and number would be siblings.

Their parents and the staff of the mansion believe the children are intellectually disabled, and the children play this up when in the company of others, so as to not interfere with what they view as a perfect childhood. But after hearing their mother wish that they were normal, the children reveal their intelligence to their parents.

Eliza is still deemed disabled, and is sent to a mental institution. Wilbur however is sent to a prep school and eventually goes to Harvard University and earns a doctorate.

Armed with the plan created with Eliza and the slogan, "Lonesome No More!," Dr. Swain wins election to the Presidency, and devotes the waning energies of the Federal government to the implementation of the plan. In the meantime, Western civilization is nearing collapse as oil runs out, and the Chinese are making vast leaps forward by miniaturizing themselves and training groups of hundreds to think as one. Eventually, the miniaturization proceeds to the point that the Chinese become so small they cause a plague among those who accidentally inhale them, ultimately destroying Western civilization beyond repair. However, even as life as we know it collapses, Swain's middle name policy continues to unite the survivors. The American population constantly risk their time and their lives to selflessly help their fellow cousins and siblings, ensuring that people may live their lives "lonesome no more."

The novel has a typical Vonnegut pattern of short snippets often ending with a punchline of sorts. These are separated by the words "hi ho", which Dr. Swain describes as a sort of verbal hiccup that has developed in his old age.

== Religion and belief in an afterlife ==
Vonnegut does not believe that traditional religions can cure loneliness or provide significant comfort. His take on belief in the afterlife is satirical. In his novel he describes a Church of Jesus Christ the Kidnapped which becomes a dominant American religion in the post-apocalyptic world of the novel. Vonnegut finds the church followers' behavior comical:

He was jerking his head around in what then seemed an eccentric manner, as though hoping to catch someone peering out at him from behind a potted palm tree or an easy chair, or even from directly overhead, from the crystal chandelier.

== Anthropological social plan ==
Vonnegut is concerned about the transitoriness of the modern lifestyle, wherein people are forced to leave their familial and cultural roots and trade those for professional and financial security. He explains in an interview:

Well, I am used to the rootlessness that goes with my profession. But I would like people to be able to stay in one community for a lifetime, to travel away from it to see the world, but always to come home again,...Until recent times, you know, human beings usually had a permanent community of relatives. They had dozens of homes to go to. So when a married couple had a fight, one or the other could go to a house three doors down and stay with a close relative until he was feeling tender again. Or if a kid was so fed up with his parents that he couldn't stand it, he could march over his uncle's for a while. And this is no longer possible. Each family is locked into its little box. The neighbors aren't relatives. There aren't other houses where people can go and be cared for.

Vonnegut was influenced by the theories of Robert Redfield, from whom he took courses at the University of Chicago. Vonnegut recalls:

When I went to the University of Chicago, and I heard the head of the Department of Anthropology, Robert Redfield, lecture on the folk society, which was essentially a stable, isolated extended family, he did not have to tell me how nice that could be.

Vonnegut identifies the root of the problem in the modernisation of production techniques in the world of economics, but instead of suggesting going back to the way of life of the nineteenth century, he designs an anthropological plan wherein extended families are created by the government with the same ease of implementation as in the distribution of Social Security numbers. Peter J. Reed, author of the bibliography Vonnegut in America says:

Though all of the slapstick mocking the idea ... some reasonably serious defence of extended family survives.

The idea of artificially extended families aims to increase the welfare and social support of the individual. However, it is not a utopian dream. Wilbur, the novel's protagonist, explains during his election campaign for the presidency how any request for money from a street beggar in the new social order should be treated:

You ask him his middle name, and when he tells you "Oyster-19" or "Chickadee-1" or "Hollyhock-13" you say to him: Buster - I happen to be a Uranium-3. You have one hundred and ninety thousand cousins and ten thousand brothers and sisters. You're not exactly alone in this world. I have relatives of my own to look after. So why don't you take a flying fuck at a rolling doughnut? Why don't you take a flying fuck at the moooooooooooon?

== Reception ==
According to Vonnegut, Slapstick received negative reviews "in The New York Times, Time, Newsweek, The New York Review of Books, The Village Voice, and Rolling Stone".

== Film adaptation ==
The book was adapted into the 1982 film Slapstick of Another Kind.
