= Street Knight =

- Directed by: Albert Magnoli
- Written by: Richard Friedman
- Produced by: Mark DiSalle
- Starring: Jeff Speakman; Christopher Neame; Bernie Casey
- Cinematography: Yakov Sklyansky
- Edited by: Wayne Wahrman
- Music by: David Michael Frank
- Distributed by: Cannon Films
- Release date: March 12, 1993 (US)
- Running time: 93 minutes
- Country: United States
- Language: English
- Box office: $841,015

Street Knight is a 1993 American action film directed by Albert Magnoli and starring Jeff Speakman.

== Plot ==
Jake Barrett (Jeff Speakman) is a former cop who retired from the LAPD following an incident where he failed to save a young hostage from a disturbed criminal. This incident has haunted him for the past several years, and he now works repairing cars at a garage once owned by his father.

The city, which has been the battleground for a conflict between street gangs the Latin Lords and Blades, is currently under a tenuous truce negotiated by the heads of the two gangs. A group of Latin Lords members drive to a meeting supposedly arranged by Blades leader "8-Ball," where they are ambushed by criminals led by James Franklin (Christopher Neame). All of them are killed by Franklin except for their driver, Carlos Sanchez (Richard Coca), who flees. Franklin stages the scene of the crime to look like the Blades carried out the killings.

A friend informs Barrett of a woman who needs his help. He meets with her and learns that she is Carlos's sister Rebecca (Jennifer Gatti). She tells him that Carlos has been missing for the two days since the shooting and asks for his help, but he initially refuses, telling her that he no longer does police work. Meanwhile, several more killings are carried out by Franklin's group as they search for Carlos. Each of the victims is a member of one of the two gangs, and their murders are carefully staged to implicate the opposing gang in each case. As a result, tension between the gangs begins rising.

Barrett meets with Latin Lords leader Cisco (Ramón Franco) and later 8-Ball (Richard Allen) and asks both gangs for time to investigate the case, having become suspicious after reviewing evidence from the first shootings. He then meets with Rebecca and agrees to help her, before asking his friend Raymond (Bernie Casey), a forensics expert, for help. However, Franklin discovers Barrett's involvement in the case and sends two men to kill him. Barrett successfully kills the two before delivering their bodies to Raymond for identification.

As a result of the staged killings, the Blades and Latin Lords are about to go to war. Barrett asks for a meeting with 8-Ball, but before they can meet, one of Franklin's men disguised as Barrett guns him down at a strip club. Franklin also has Raymond killed, but before he dies, he passes a disk containing the results of his analysis to Barrett. Now a wanted man, Barrett acts on information from Rebecca and finds Carlos at an observatory, taking him into protective custody. However, Franklin tracks down and abducts Rebecca, then sends information to Barrett demanding he trade Carlos for her. Raymond's analysis reveals that the criminals are corrupt cops led by Franklin, who is an ex-Special Forces soldier. Barrett drops Carlos off at a safehouse before going to the abandoned rail yard described in the demand, but Carlos secretly follows.

With the police sufficiently distracted, Franklin and his men carry out their planned diamond heist. After stealing the diamonds they frame the heist as the deed of the Latin Lords before heading to the rail yard. Barrett informs the investigating officer, Lt. Bill Crowe (Lewis Van Bergen) of the rail yard before going there himself. He battles Franklin's gang, but is unaware that the Latin Lords and Blades are present and giving him aid. He confronts Franklin, who has Rebecca as a hostage, duplicating the situation from years ago that caused Barrett to quit the force. When Barrett puts down his gun, Franklin releases Rebecca and opens fire, but Barrett uses a hidden gun to shoot back. After they fight hand-to-hand, Rebecca returns Barrett's gun to him, allowing him to open fire and kill Franklin.

In the aftermath, Barrett's name is cleared. The Blades and Latin Lords, who were informed of the truth by Carlos, lay down their grudges against each other. Carlos and Rebecca are reunited, and they leave together with Barrett, who has become Rebecca's love interest. Before leaving, Barrett is told by Crowe that the department is willing to reinstate him, to which Barrett says "I'll think about it."

== Cast ==
- Jeff Speakman as Jake Barrett
- Christopher Neame as James Franklin
- Bernie Casey as Raymond
- Jennifer Gatti as Rebecca Sanchez
- Richard Coca as Carlos Sanchez
- Ramón Franco as Cisco
- Richard Allen as "8-Ball"
- Lewis Van Bergen as Lieutenant Bill Crowe

== Reception ==
The film opened to mostly negative reviews. Chris William of the Los Angeles Times called the film "almost pleasureless", said it showed Speakman "looking like the poor man’s Don Johnson on steroids, and acting like it too" and added that "here are no clues here that would remind anyone that Magnoli debuted with a well-reviewed hit, Purple Rain, nine years ago--though the fact that Speakman’s naked rear is lovingly lingered upon within the first five minutes has a touch of Prince butt-love to it, and there might even be a dash of Apollonia in Gatti’s fully clothed but vacant performance." Emanuel Levy wrote in Variety that "political correctness and unrealistic hopefulness inform "Street Knight," a formulaic actioner that exploits, but doesn't deal with, the timely issue of gang warfare in Los Angeles. Proficient production values and adherence to genre conventions may result in moderate success at the box office, a useful warm-up on the way to videoland." Richard Harrington of The Washington Post said that it "could just as well be titled Sleep Tight, except for its annoyingly loud soundtrack, featuring excessive shooting and expressive punching, as well as one of the worst synthesizer scores this side of a 900 line. Part of a probably hopeless campaign aimed at turning Jeff (The Perfect Weapon) Speakman into a martial arts-action film superstar, Street Knight never gets out of the starting gate, which is blocked by a ludicrous script looking to capitalize on Los Angeles gang violence." Roger Hurlburt of the Sun-Sentinel described the film as "a vicious and convoluted action-drama" that "leaves a trail of bodies from the opening frame", and described Speakman as "a pitiful actor barely able to play the hunky avenging angel", closing his review by saying that "it's frightening to think this is the kind of motion picture Americans want to see."
