= Land of the Free (film) =

- Directed by: Jerry Jameson
- Written by: Maria James; Jerry Jameson; Ronald Jacobs
- Produced by: Richard Pepin; Joseph Merhi
- Starring: William Shatner; Jeff Speakman; Lisa Darr
- Cinematography: Ken Blakely
- Edited by: Stephen Adrianson
- Music by: Stephen Cohn
- Production company: PM Entertainment Group
- Release date: 1998
- Country: United States
- Language: English

Land of the Free is a 1998 American thriller film directed by Jerry Jameson and starring William Shatner, Jeff Speakman and Lisa Darr.

== Plot summary ==
William Shatner plays the role of Aidan Carvell, a businessman running for Congress as an independent candidate with a broad libertarian agenda. Unknown to the public, Carvell is training and arming a militia force. Carvell's political campaign manager Frank Jennings (Jeff Speakman) is persuaded by the FBI to assist them in indicting Carvell for treason. Carvell sets out to punish Jennings for this betrayal, requiring Jennings to fight for his own safety as well as that of his family.

== Cast ==
- William Shatner as Aidan Carvell
- Jeff Speakman as Frank Jennings
- Lisa Darr as Annie
- Chris Lemmon as Agent Thornton
- Larry Cedar as Green
- Cody Dorkin as Randy Jennings
- John Furey as Luckenbill
- Charlie Robinson as McCuster
- Robert Torti as Fitzpatrick
- Candice Azzara as Waitress
- Arthur Hiller as Judge
- Bobby Bragg as Andrews
- Tony Blassfield as Gilman
- Danny Breen as Bailiff
- Chris Byrne as Leader
- Alisa Cristensen as Helene
- Rance Howard as Hotel Manager
- Bernie Kopell as TV Host
- Signy Coleman as Reporter #2
