= Running Red =

- Movie Poster
- Directed by: Jerry P. Jacobs
- Written by: David C. Stauffer; George Ferris
- Produced by: Ronald Jacobs
- Starring: Jeff Speakman; Angie Everhart; Stanley Kamel; Elya Baskin; Cassie Ray
- Cinematography: Ken Blakey
- Edited by: Kevin Mock; Dan Williams
- Music by: Jim Halfpenny
- Production company: PM Entertainment Group
- Distributed by: PM Entertainment Group
- Release dates: March 30, 1999 (Greece); January 26, 2000 (U.S.)
- Running time: 92 min.
- Country: United States
- Language: English

Running Red is a 1999 American film starring Jeff Speakman and Angie Everhart. It was directed by Jerry P. Jacobs.

== Plot ==
A former member of an elite Soviet military team is ordered to kill three men or his family will be exterminated.

== Cast ==
- Jeff Speakman as Greg / Gregori
- Angie Everhart as Katherine
- Stanley Kamel as Alexi
- Elya Baskin as Strelkin
- Cassie Ray as Amanda
- Bart Braverman as Mercier
- Geoffrey Rivas as Diaz
- DeLane Matthews as Stephanie
- Robert Miano as Chambers
- Christopher Boyer as Gorch
- Lisa Arturo as Fawn
- Noah Blake as Sergei
- Jacob Chambers as Griff
- Pete Koch as Dominic
- Lincoln Simonds as Nikolai
- Peter Kwong as Cheung
- Tim Sitarz as "Stick"

== Reception ==
TV Guide said, "High-speed chases, death-by-locomotive and multiple slayings dot the landscape of this derivative but high-octane thriller that delivers plenty of kickboxing and explosive mayhem. But the acting is wooden (even by action-movie standards) and there are way too many screaming confrontations between the leads."
