= Love Grammar =

Single by John Parr

from the album John Parr
- B-side: "Heartbreaker" (May 1985 issue); "Treat Me Like an Animal" (November 1985 issue)
- Released: November 1985
- Genre: Rock
- Length: 3:59
- Label: Atlantic
- Songwriter(s): John Parr
- Producer(s): John Parr

John Parr singles chronology
"St. Elmo's Fire (Man in Motion)" (1985)	"Love Grammar" (1985)	"Don't Leave Your Mark on Me" (1986)

Music video
- "Love Grammar" on YouTube

"Love Grammar" is a song by English singer and musician John Parr, released in 1985 as the third single from his self-titled debut album (1984). The song was written and produced by Parr.

== Writing ==
Speaking to Songfacts in 2016, Parr recalled of the song, "I love wordplay. English grammar. I before E except after C. I thought of a fun twist on a lovers' relationship where the girl always puts me first until she realises she has me. 'I Before he except after she knows I'll always be there'."

== Release ==
In mid-1985, "Love Grammar" was issued in the United States as the third single from Parr's self-titled debut album. It failed to receive much attention on radio as stations were all playing a different Parr song, "St. Elmo's Fire (Man in Motion)" from the soundtrack of the film St. Elmo's Fire. "St. Elmo's Fire" was subsequently released as a single and reached number one on the US Billboard Hot 100. "Love Grammar" was then reissued as a single and reached number 89 on the US Billboard Hot 100.

== Music video ==
The song's music video was directed by Andrew Unangst and produced by Fashion Vision Productions. It was shot in Los Angeles in October 1985, including at the Roxy Theatre. The video was sponsored by the sports leisurewear company Chams de Baron, who used the medium as a form of promotion for their range. Parr's fashion model girlfriend in the video wore their sportswear, and Parr himself, plus many of the extras, wore Chams jeans. The video's airings on cable and affiliate stations featured regular and prominent use of the Chams logo and a 30-second commercial was also created. As the use of logos in videos was banned by MTV, the version of the video played by the channel featured no logos. The video achieved light rotation on MTV.

== Critical reception ==
Upon its release as a single in May 1985, Cash Box described "Love Grammar" as "a soft and tenderly rocking track which is highlighted by Parr's melodic sensibilities and powerful vocal ability". In a review of the November 1985 reissue, the magazine considered the "aggressive rocker" to be "another fine vehicle for Parr's outstanding rough edged vocal range". They added, "A high flying refrain gives this tune catchy hooks, but maintains a decidedly AOR appeal." Billboard described it as "an episodic rock track".

== Track listing ==
7-inch single (US May 1985 release)

1. "Love Grammar" – 3:59
2. "Heartbreaker" – 5:26

7-inch single (US November 1985 release)

1. "Love Grammar" – 3:59
2. "Treat Me Like an Animal" – 4:28

7-inch single (Japanese release)

1. "Love Grammar" – 4:19
2. "Magical" – 3:55

== Personnel ==
"Love Grammar"

- John Parr – lead vocals, guitar
- Chris Marra – guitar
- Richard Cottle – keyboards
- Colin Farley – bass
- Simon Phillips – drums
- Chuck Kirkpatrick – backing vocals
- Johnne Sambataro – backing vocals

Production

- John Parr – producer ("Love Grammar", "Treat Me Like An Animal")
- Pete Solley – producer ("Heartbreaker")

== Charts ==
Chart (1985)	Peak position
US Billboard Hot 100	89
US Cash Box Top 100 Singles	85
