= Deadly Outbreak =

- Directed by: Rick Avery
- Written by: Harel Goldstein; Charles Morris Jr.
- Starring: Jeff Speakman; Ron Silver; Rochelle Swanson; Jack Adalist; Jonathan Sagall; Idan Alterman
- Edited by: Alain Jakubowicz
- Distributed by: Nu Image Films
- Release date: September 17, 1996 (US home video)
- Running time: 88 minutes
- Language: English

Deadly Outbreak (released in certain markets as Deadly Takeover) is an action film released by US-Israeli company Nu Image in 1996, and directed by former stuntman Rick Avery.

Set in Israel, it is an unofficial remake of the 1988 film Die Hard, with the last act of the film also borrowing heavily from the 1994 film Speed, released two years earlier.

The film was rated 3.2 on the Letterbox site. According to IMDb, this film was edited into Steven Seagal's Ticker.

== Plot ==
Sergeant Dutton Hatfield is working for the American embassy. His latest assignment is to escort a supposed team of scientists inside the Research Development Institute facility outside Tel Aviv, Israel. However, the scientists are revealed to be terrorists in disguise, led by Colonel Baron. Baron is seeking retribution for his humiliation when he had an ideological disagreement with his superior officer General Miller, over the merits of the Gulf War, and Miller forced him to retire after Miller became Chairman of the Joint Chiefs of Staff. Baron and his eight men, including an insider scientist named Dr. Berg, are seeking a sample of a deadly virus that is being developed inside the facility, and plan to use both the virus and a set of five pre-arranged bombs in Washington, D.C. as leverage to arrange an escape and a payment of $510 million.

Once the takeover of the facility begins, Hatfield quickly discovers the plot and eliminates three terrorists, while the remaining five take the only four surviving scientists - Pawklowsky (Andre Kashkar), Elaine Starkov (Bridget Marks), Eliot Stein (Larry Smith), and Abrahams (Ami Dayan) - as hostages. Hatfield then meets Dr. Allie Levin, the scientist behind the development of the virus for biological warfare, and with the help of a communications officer named Ira, tries to have her escorted out through the evacuation tunnels in the basement. However, they encounter two more terrorists in the basement; Hatfield manages to kill both, but not before one of them guns down Ira, after he acts as a human shield to defend Dr. Levin. After Ira's death, Hatfield and Levin bond over their respective separations with their spouses; Levin's husband, a pilot in the United States Air Force, was killed in the Gulf War, while Hatfield's wife left him for his former best friend. Hatfield and Levin quickly become attracted to each other.

Baron then orders his ruthless right-hand man Ramos to begin executing the hostages, starting with Dr. Abrahams. In order to avoid more dead hostages, Hatfield agrees to a swap with Ramos to exchange the cylinder containing the virus with the second hostage, Dr. Stein. However, once Ramos retrieves the cylinder, he kills Stein and flees. Unbeknownst to Hatfield, another remaining terrorist named Gallo has taken Dr. Levin and brought her back to be with the other hostages. Baron orders Dr. Berg to prepare a sample of the toxin as a demonstration, only to betray Berg and demonstrate its lethal effects on him; after smashing the vial containing the sample and ripping off Berg's gas mask, the toxin kills him within seconds, thus satisfying Baron.

Baron and Ramos take Levin, Pawklowsky, and Starkov aboard a bus after both General Miller and Israeli Colonel Gideon have negotiated a cleared roadway to the airport, with $500 million being wired to Baron's designated account and the remaining $10 million loaded onto the waiting plane, piloted by one final terrorist. Gallo pursues Hatfield in security vans down the numerous evacuation tunnels, culminating in both of them crashing in the facility's loading dock, with Gallo's van exploding and killing him. Colonel Gideon arrives in a helicopter just in time to pick up Hatfield, and the two pursue the bus. Ramos kills both Starkov and Pawklowsky to try to convince the soldiers to back off, but Hatfield leaps onto the roof of the bus anyway and drops in through the roof hatch. After a brief fight with Ramos, Hatfield gains the upper hand and puts him in a chokehold just as the bus arrives at the airport. Hatfield tries to force Baron to stop the bus by threatening to kill Ramos, only for Baron to shoot Ramos himself. Hatfield then attacks Baron and knocks him unconscious at the wheel, and Hatfield and Levin both jump out with the cylinder just before the bus crashes into a parked fuel truck, exploding and killing Baron. Hatfield then notices the final surviving terrorist at the getaway plane, who has taken Hatfield's son hostage. The terrorist shoots Hatfield in the shoulder, only for Gideon to snipe him from the chopper. The wounded Hatfield reunites with both his son and Levin.

== Cast ==
- Jeff Speakman as Sergeant Dutton Hatfield
- Ron Silver as Colonel Baron
- Rochelle Swanson as Dr. Allie Levin
- Jack Adalist as Ramos
- Jonathan Sagall as Gallo
- Idan Alterman as Ira
- Dan Turjeman as Colonel Gideon
- Yehuda Efroni as Dr. Berg
- Jeri Hayman as General Miller
