= Peter Kwong (actor) =

American actor (1952–2025)

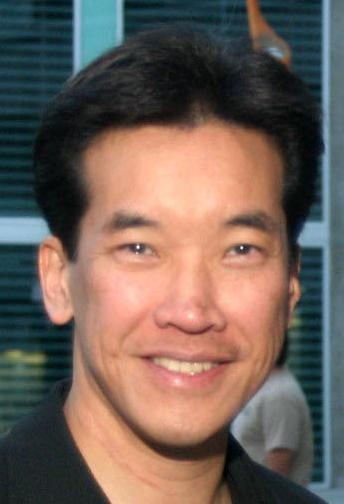
- Kwong in 2004
- Born: April 9, 1952; Sacramento, California, U.S.
- Died: May 27, 2025 (aged 73); Burbank, California, U.S.
- Occupations: Actor, martial artist
- Years active: 1976–2024

Peter Kwong (April 9, 1952 – May 27, 2025) was an American actor. He is known for his roles in Big Trouble in Little China, The Golden Child, and Cooties.

== Early life and career ==
Peter Kwong was born in Sacramento, California, on April 9, 1952, to two Chinese immigrant parents.

He graduated from California State University at Sacramento with a theatre arts degree, and also studied at American Conservatory Theater. Additionally, Kwon trained in a variety of martial arts, and taught Tai Chi Chuan.

== Personal life and death ==
Kwong died in his sleep in Burbank, California, on May 27, 2025, at the age of 73.

== Filmography ==
=== Film ===
Year	Title	Role
1978	Straight Time	Grocery Clerk
1982	Slapstick of Another Kind	Chinese Astronaut
1986	Never Too Young to Die	Cliff
1986	Big Trouble in Little China	Rain
1986	The Golden Child	Tommy Tong
1987	Steele Justice	Pham Van Kwan
1988	Skeleton Coast	Tohsiro
1988	The Presidio	Squad Room Officer
1989	Gleaming the Cube	Bobby Nguyen
1990	Angel Town	Henry
1992	Frame-up II: The Cover-Up	David Wong
1994	I’ll Do Anything	Popcorn Pictures Intern
1995	Theodore Rex	Toymaker
1996	Paper Dragons	Foreman
1999	Running Red	Cheung
1999	Row Your Boat	Tony Lo Fat
2003	Ghost Rock	Song
2009	Aussie & Ted’s Great Adventure	Mr. Chen
2011	Budz House	Japanese Businessman #1
2014	Cooties	Mr. Hatachi
