= Tango & Cash =

1989 American buddy cop action comedy film

- Theatrical release poster
- Directed by: Andrei Konchalovsky
- Screenplay by: Randy Feldman
- Produced by: Jon Peters; Peter Guber
- Starring: Sylvester Stallone; Kurt Russell; Jack Palance
- Cinematography: Donald E. Thorin
- Edited by: Hubert C. de la Bouillerie; Robert A. Ferretti
- Music by: Harold Faltermeyer
- Production company: The Guber-Peters Company
- Distributed by: Warner Bros.
- Release date: December 22, 1989 (United States)
- Running time: 104 minutes
- Country: United States
- Language: English
- Budget: $54 million
- Box office: $120.4 million

Tango & Cash is a 1989 American buddy cop action comedy film starring Sylvester Stallone, Kurt Russell, Jack Palance, and Teri Hatcher. The film follows Raymond Tango and Gabriel Cash, the titular pair of rival police detectives, who are forced to work together after a criminal mastermind frames them for murder.

The film was chiefly directed by Andrei Konchalovsky, with Albert Magnoli and Peter MacDonald taking over in the later stages of filming, with Stuart Baird overseeing postproduction. The multiple directors were due to a long and troubled production process, which included numerous script rewrites and clashes between Konchalovsky and producer Jon Peters over creative differences.

Tango & Cash was released by Warner Bros. in the United States on December 22, 1989, the same day as Always. The film received mixed reviews from critics, but was a box-office success, earning over $120 million on a $54 million budget.

== Plot ==
Lieutenants Raymond Tango of the Westside and Gabriel Cash of the Eastside are regarded as two of the Los Angeles Police Department (LAPD) finest detectives, where they are both assigned to the Narcotics Division and have earned reputations for their successful and often high-risk drug busts across Greater Los Angeles. They are opposites in almost every respect and are intense rivals, each convinced of his own superiority, despite having never met. Unbeknownst to Tango and Cash, their intercepted drug shipments belong to a criminal organization headed by Yves Perret. Frustrated, Perret and his associates plan their revenge against the detectives, but refrain from killing them as to not turn them into martyrs. Instead, Perret devises an elaborate scheme to ruin their lives - frame them for murder.

Tango and Cash are separately informed of a drug deal, where they meet each other for the first time. The pair discovers the wiretapped corpse of an undercover FBI agent; suddenly, additional FBI agents led by Agent Wyler arrive to arrest them for murder. Wyler finds Cash's backup pistol near the body, and at trial, an audio tape ostensibly recording the pair shooting the agent after discussing a drug purchase is used against them, verified by audio expert Skinner. With the evidence stacked against them, Tango and Cash plead no contest to a lesser charge in exchange for reduced sentences in a minimum-security prison, but they are held in a maximum-security prison alongside several criminals they had arrested previously.

Once in prison, Tango and Cash are roused from their beds and tortured by Perret's henchman Requin and a gang of inmates, until Matt Sokowski, the assistant warden and Cash's former commanding officer, rescues them. Sokowski recommends they escape and provides them with a plan, but Tango opts out. When Cash tries to escape, he finds Sokowski murdered and is pursued by the guards before being rescued by Tango. Reaching the roof, Cash ziplines outside the prison walls, but Tango is attacked by an inmate before he can follow, and defeats him by knocking him into a transformer. To clear their names, they separate; Tango tells Cash that if he needs to contact him, he can go to the Cleopatra Club and ask for "Katherine".

The detectives visit the witnesses who framed them in court; Tango intercepts Wyler, who admits that Requin was in charge of the setup and is killed shortly after by a car bomb; Cash discovers that Skinner made the incriminating tape himself. At the Cleopatra Club, Cash finds Katherine—Tango's sister who goes by the name of Kiki—and when police arrive at the club, she helps Cash escape by dressing him as a woman. Later that night, Tango reunites with Cash and the duo are met at Kiki's house by Tango's commanding officer. He gives them Requin's address and tells them they have 24 hours to find out for whom he works; Tango and Cash apprehend Requin and interrogate him, and trick him into giving up Perret's name using a dummy grenade.

Cash's friend, weapons expert Owen, lends the pair an armed RV, which they use to storm Perret's hideout and defeat his pursuing guards, and Requin is killed when Cash uses a real grenade. However, Perret has Kiki kidnapped and starts a timer to trigger his hideout's self-destruct. He appears in a hall of mirrors holding Kiki at gunpoint. Both detectives pick out the correct Perret and shoot him in the head. They rescue Kiki and barely escape as the hideout explodes. Now able to get along, Tango and Cash joke half seriously about Cash's desire to date Kiki as a newspaper headline announces they have been cleared of all charges and returned to LAPD duty as heroes.

== Cast ==
- Sylvester Stallone is Lieutenant Raymond (Ray) Tango, the best cop in West Los Angeles. A slick, refined detective who trades stocks on the side, Tango wears three-piece Armani suits, drives a Cadillac Allanté, carries a Smith & Wesson Model 36 as his sidearm, and lives in a middle-class house with his sister.
- Kurt Russell is Lieutenant Gabriel (Gabe) Cash, the best cop in East Los Angeles. A stereotypical "cowboy cop" with an interest in weaponry, Cash wears tattered clothes and cowboy boots with built-in shotguns, drives a vintage Chevrolet Corvette, carries a Ruger GP100 with an experimental laser sight as his sidearm, and lives in a bachelor pad apartment in a run-down neighborhood.
- Jack Palance is Yves Perret, crime lord of Southern California, who arranges for Tango and Cash to be framed for murder.
- Teri Hatcher is Katherine (Kiki) Tango, a club dancer and Tango's younger sister, who rents a room in his house.
- Michael J. Pollard is Owen, Cash's weapon-engineer friend who provides him with his firearms, shotgun boots, and later the armored RV.
- Brion James is Requin, Perret's ponytailed Cockney henchman and courier.
- James Hong is Quan, the Los Angeles Triad leader and associate of Perret's.
- Robert Z'Dar is "Face", a psychotic convict who has a particular grudge against Tango for breaking "his ribs, his leg, and his jaw".
- Marc Alaimo is Lopez, a Mexican cartel boss and associate of Perret's.
- Roy Brocksmith is FBI Agent Davis.
- Phil Rubenstein is Matt Sokowski, the assistant warden when Tango and Cash are in prison.
- Lewis Arquette is FBI Agent Wyler.
- Clint Howard is "Slinky", Tango's mental-patient cellmate in prison.
- Michael Jeter is Skinner, a sound engineer paid to implicate Tango and Cash.
- Edward Bunker is Captain Holmes, Cash's commanding officer.
- Geoffrey Lewis is Captain Schroeder, Tango's commanding officer (uncredited).
- Savely Kramarov is Car Owner who believes in Perestroika.

== Production ==
=== Development and writing ===
The film was known as The Set Up and was based on a script by Randy Feldman, which was based on an idea by Jon Peters and Peter Guber. Sylvester Stallone and Patrick Swayze were signed to star. In March 1989 Andrei Konchalovsky signed to direct. After Swayze dropped out and went on to star in Road House, he was replaced by Kurt Russell.

The original director of photography, Donald Peterman, left the production after four months, including a month of preproduction; his replacement, Barry Sonnenfeld, was fired by Stallone after only one week's work on the film. Donald E. Thorin, who had shot Stallone's movie Lock Up earlier that year, was Sonnenfeld's replacement.

=== Pre-production ===
After nearly three months of filming, director Konchalovsky was fired by producer Peters in a dispute over the movie's ending. In his 1999 memoir, Elevating Deception, Konchalovsky said that the reason he was fired was because Stallone and he wanted to give the film a more serious tone and make it more realistic than the producers wanted, especially Peters, who kept pushing for the film to be goofier and campier, and as such, his relationship with Peters became untenable. Another reason why Konchalovsky was fired was his refusal to agree to what he referred to as the "increasingly insane" demands that Peters had. Konchalovsky said that he was initially hired to make a buddy cop movie with plenty of humor, but Peters basically wanted to turn it into a spoof, without any semblance of seriousness, and Konchalovsky refused.

Essentially, Konchalovsky argued that they were simply trying to make two different movies, and when Peters realized his inability to bend Konchalovsky to his will, he fired him. According to actor Brion James, in a 1999 interview with Louis Paul, the film was in disarray from the very beginning and by the half-way point of the shoot, when the film was several months behind schedule, Peters and Konchalovsky were no longer speaking. James agreed that the official reason Konchalovsky was fired was because of the budget, but he also said that going over budget was not Konchalovsky's fault, and that Konchalovsky did not deserve to be fired. Konchalovsky, however, had nothing but praise for Stallone, and both James and he said that despite Stallone's ego and decision to fire both original cinematographers, and the fact that he had a hand in Konchalovsky's firing, Stallone was the one person who held the project together, and that he was a constant voice of reason on an increasingly chaotic set.

According to Konchalovsky, by the end of principal photography, Stallone was unofficially working as producer, director, and writer, as well as star, and Konchalovsky believes that had it not been for Stallone, Peters would have fired him much sooner than he did. Production sources said that Konchalovsky had been given impossible scheduling demands, and was then made the scapegoat when he fell behind. Konchalovsky was replaced with Albert Magnoli, who filmed all the chase and fight scenes in the ending. Reportedly, executive producer Peter MacDonald, who was also one of the film's second unit directors, took over directing the movie before Magnoli was brought in. A year earlier, MacDonald had to step in as director on Stallone's previous movie, Rambo III, after original director Russell Mulcahy was fired by Stallone.

Also, a legal battle occurred between producers Guber and Peters and Warner Bros. Guber and Peters complained in Los Angeles Superior Court that Warner had replaced them on the project, and over Peters' objections, "advanced the release date of the film by many months". The film went into production on June 12, 1989, and was originally scheduled to wrap by August 25, 1989. Filming concluded on October 20, 1989.

=== Post-production ===
In late August, the directors were switched and after principal photography was finished in September, replacement director Magnoli called everyone back to the set for two more weeks of additional reshoots, which included filming a completely new opening sequence. Filming was finished on October 20, 1989, eight weeks before its original scheduled theatrical opening in 1600 theatres across the United States.

The movie was racing to make its December 15 release, but due to the Warner Bros. studio's complaints on every different cut that was edited before they approved the final (theatrical) version, it barely made the deadline and ended up being shipped to theaters in "wet prints" – an industry term meaning that it was just barely completed before its release date.

Because Warner Bros. wanted no risk of the same problems with the MPAA as it had had with Cobra, its previous Stallone movie, it ordered the editors to cut some death scenes in the last part of the movie while it was being re-edited, which explain the use of "jump cuts" every time someone is shot in the movie. The movie ultimately got the R rating that the studio and producers wanted.

One of the writers who worked on the constantly changing script for the film was Jeffrey Boam, who also worked on the scripts for the Lethal Weapon films. He did a rewrite of the script, which he described as being long, incredible, and awful, that did not change anything conceptually. Though he completed many rewrites, he hated both script and film, and did not want to be credited for his work.

Behind-the-scenes problems (including filming, script changes, and later constant cuts and re-editing of the movie) were so big and so bad that one of the more experienced crew members said in an interview: "This was the worst-organized, most poorly prepared film I've ever been on in my life. From the first day we started, no one knew what the hell anyone was doing." This same crew member also mentioned some reasons why director Konchalovsky was fired; "He found himself in over his head. There were scenes scheduled for three days that were so complicated they should have been scheduled for six or seven days. They were trying to do a 22-week movie in 11 weeks."

The film ultimately missed its budget by over $20 million and had to be completely re-edited by editor Stuart Baird prior to its theatrical release. Tango & Cash was one of many films to be turned over to Baird, who came onto projects as an editing "doctor" when studios such as Warner Bros. were displeased with the first cut (in this case, second, third, ...) turned in by the filmmakers. Baird was also called in by Warner Bros. to re-edit another Stallone action movie, Demolition Man (1993), for the same reasons.

After Baird was brought in by Warner Bros. to save the movie in the editing room, he hired Hubert de La Bouillerie to edit the film and Harold Faltermeyer and Gary Chang to compose the music. Chang provided additional music near the end of the movie, because Faltermeyer could not return to rescore the final reel of the film, as it was constantly being edited because of constant complaints from Warner Bros. Because of the massive re-editing, some plot points and even some action scenes were deleted.

The theatrical trailer was made using the footage from one of the earlier cuts of the movie. This is why it shows some deleted and alternate scenes, which were changed or cut from the movie during the re-editing, which include an alternate cut of the scene where Raymond Tango (Stallone) and Gabriel Cash (Russell) first meet in the warehouse; an alternate cut of the shower scene between Tango and Cash; a deleted or alternate fight scene between Cash and a Chinese assassin, during which Cash says, "I hate you karate guys"; and a deleted scene in which Tango is reading the newspaper and then pulls out a shotgun and shoots at a car. The trailer also shows extra shots from other scenes.

In a 1999 interview with Louis Paul at the Chiller Theatre Convention, actor Brion James elaborated on his experiences working on Tango & Cash and the film's production problems:

BJ: Tango and Cash, I had two scenes when I started the film. Konchalovsky wanted to work with me for years, he worked for Cannon, they couldn't pay me, so I couldn't work for them. He wanted me to work with him on Runaway Train. Finally, I get to work with him and he calls me in and I meet Stallone and Russell and they say "Yeah, he's great." I just had two scenes with these guys, they chase me around, and I get beat up and that's it. So, I get there and I'm acting with Stallone and made my character have a Cockney accent just to add something. I said I'm in a movie with all of these guys, how am I going to chew the scenery with all of these fuckers? So, I created the Cockney, I'm not just another hit man from Cleveland. They loved it. They played off of it, they got into it. So Stallone started re-writing the script, the script wasn't really ready, but they were there to go, so when you got to go, you go. The script was ready, and when it was not, he would fix it. The film was twenty million dollars over budget and I wound up being on the film for fourteen weeks. My part went from a few days, to much bigger. So, I became the main bad guy, and not Jack Palance.

LP: Konchalovsky lost that picture, didn't he?

BJ: He did a great job, but Sly got him fired. Sly is very protective about his films. He got his own DP in, and the film went twenty million dollars over budget. So the studio had to justify it, and fired him, saying it was the director's fault. It wasn't his fault. They didn't have a script. I was even re-writing at the end of the day, over and over. They only had three weeks left and they brought in Albert Magnoli. He did rock videos and a Prince movie (Purple Rain). They gave this guy three quarters of a million dollars to do three weeks. By the time he got there, I was like don't talk to me, stay back. I knew this character for weeks, I know what I'm doing. It wound up being a great film, that eventually made a lot of money. It's one of the biggest pirated videos in the history of Russia. There were 80,000 pirated copies. Warner Bros. was crazy not to market it properly, but that film was huge. I went to the Ukraine when I was shooting another film, and I was mobbed. I was in the Black Sea and I had no idea that people even knew who I was.

Stallone later said "I had a lot of great times on that film. Kurt nailed some of those scenes, like the pro he is." Speaking on both Konchalovsky and Magnoli, Stallone also said:

Andrei was a real gentleman and I thought his take on Tango and Cash was very good and would've been infinitely more realistic had he been allowed to continue. His replacement was more attuned to comic pop culture so the film had a dramatic shift into a more light-hearted direction.

== Music ==
A soundtrack was never released, as the songs were already released on the artists' albums. The film score, which was composed by Harold Faltermeyer, was released for the first time on January 30, 2007, by La-La Land Records (LLLCD 1052) in 3000 Limited Sets.

=== Songs ===
- "Best of What I Got" – Bad English
- "Let the Day Begin" – The Call
- "Don't Go" – Yazoo
- "Poison" – Alice Cooper
- "It's No Crime" – Kenneth "Babyface" Edmonds
- "Harlem Nocturne" – Darktown Strutters

== Reception ==
=== Box office ===
The film opened on December 22, 1989, and during its opening weekend, the movie grossed $6.6 million from 1,409 theaters, averaging $4,704 per theater, and ranking number two at the box office. The film saw its $54 million production budget return box-office receipts of $120.4 million. The film also sold well on Video cassette.

=== Critical response ===
On the review aggregator website Rotten Tomatoes, 31% of 48 critics' reviews are positive. The website's consensus reads: "Brutally violent and punishingly dull, this cookie-cutter buddy cop thriller isn't even fun enough to reach 'so bad it's good' status." Metacritic, which uses a weighted average, assigned the film a score of 41 out of 100, based on 15 critics, indicating "mixed or average" reviews. Audiences polled by CinemaScore gave the film an average grade of "B+" on an A+ to F scale.

The New York Times criticized the plot, the screenplay, and the acting. Michael Wilmington of the Los Angeles Times called it "a waste of talent and energy on all levels", criticizing the film as both illogical and predictable. Dave Kehr of the Chicago Tribune wrote that one interpretation of the film is "a crafty foreigner's sly parody of the current state of American culture".

=== Accolades ===
Tango & Cash was nominated for three Golden Raspberry Awards for Worst Actor (Stallone for this film and Lock Up), Worst Supporting Actress (Russell in drag), and Worst Screenplay at the 10th Golden Raspberry Awards.

== Potential sequel ==
In September 2019, Stallone revealed that he had a story prepared for a potential sequel and was trying to convince Russell to sign onto the project. However, while Stallone was excited to film a sequel, Russell was unsure if he wanted to, saying that by then they were in their "unprime". As of 2025, no further news has materialized on the sequel.
