= Slapstick of Another Kind =

1982 film by Steven Paul

- Promotional poster for video release
- Directed by: Steven Paul
- Written by: Steven Paul
- Based on: Slapstick by Kurt Vonnegut
- Produced by: Steven Paul
- Starring: Jerry Lewis; Madeline Kahn; Marty Feldman; John Abbott; Jim Backus; Samuel Fuller; Merv Griffin; Virginia Graham; Pat Morita
- Cinematography: Anthony B. Richmond
- Edited by: Doug Jackson
- Music by: Michel Legrand (1982 cut); Morton Stevens (1984 cut)
- Distributed by: International Film Marketing
- Release dates: 1982 (France); March 1984 (U.S.)
- Running time: 82/84 minutes
- Country: United States
- Language: English
- Budget: $4 million

Slapstick of Another Kind is a 1984 American science fiction comedy film starring Jerry Lewis, Madeline Kahn and Marty Feldman. It was filmed in 1982, and released in March 1984 by both The S. Paul Company/Serendipity Entertainment Releasing Company and International Film Marketing. The film was written and directed by Steven Paul and is loosely based on the novel Slapstick (1976) by Kurt Vonnegut.

== Plot ==
The People's Republic of China is severing relations with all other nations. They have mastered the art of miniaturization, and have shrunk all their people to the height of two inches. The ambassador of China, Ah Fong, announces during a press conference that the key to all knowledge can be found from twins.

Caleb Swain and his wife Letitia are called "the most beautiful of all the beautiful people" by the press. However, when Lutetia gives birth to Wilbur and Eliza, twins who are called "monsters", the family doctor, Dr. Frankenstein, informs the parents that the twins won't live more than a few months. The Swains decide to allow the twins to live their short life in a mansion staffed with servants, including Sylvester.

Fifteen years later, the twins are still alive. They have large heads and appear to be mentally disabled. Their parents, who have not seen them in all those years, receive a visit from the former Chinese ambassador Ah Fong who informs them that their children are geniuses who can solve the world's problems.

Along with the President of the United States, Caleb and Lutetia pay Wilbur and Eliza a visit. They reveal themselves to be well-behaved and intelligent, explaining that they behaved "stupid" around the servants because they were simply emulating them.

A series of tests reveal that there is a telepathic connection between the twins, and their intelligence is only functional when they are together. Furthermore, when their heads are touching they reach a level of intelligence that has never been surpassed.

Fearful of incest, Caleb and Lutetia separate the twins. They become despondent without each other, and Ah Fong appears again to order them to seek out each other. Once united, a spaceship appears and reveals that they are really aliens who were sent to Earth to solve all of the planet's problems. However, their alien father The Beaver reveals that Earth cannot handle their intelligence and returns them to their home world.

== Cast ==
- Jerry Lewis as Wilbur Swain / Caleb Swain
- Madeline Kahn as Eliza Swain / Letitia Swain
- Marty Feldman as Sylvester
- John Abbott as Dr. Frankenstein
- Jim Backus as President of the United States
- Samuel Fuller as Colonel Sharp
- Merv Griffin as Anchorman
- Pat Morita as Ambassador Ah Fong
- Virginia Graham as Gossip Specialist
- Ben Frank as Quentin
- Peter Kwong as Astronaut
- Steven Paul as Ensign
- Orson Welles as The Beaver (voice)

== Production ==
The film was loosely based on the novel Slapstick: Or Lonesome No More! by Kurt Vonnegut. Director Steven Paul had played Paul Ryan in the stage production of Vonnegut's Happy Birthday, Wanda June and reprised the role in Mark Robson's film adaptation. Paul's screenplay shifted away from the serious aspects of the novel and placed more emphasis on its humor, as well as excluding Vonnegut's view of groups as extended families "whose spiritual core is common decency", and the importance of courtesy, kindness and dignity. Vonnegut considered the novel to be his worst work.

Martial artist Peter Kwong made one of his earliest appearances in this film, playing an astronaut in a flying fortune cookie.

== Release ==
This film was released in Europe in 1982, but did not see a US release until March 1984 at the Pacific's Picwood Theatre in Los Angeles. It was released to cable television as Slapstick. There are two different versions, the 1982 version running 84 minutes, and the 1984 version, running 82 minutes. Jerry Lewis promoted the US release on the March 21, 1984 episode of The Tonight Show Starring Johnny Carson.

== Reception and legacy ==
Gene Siskel and Roger Ebert panned the film in their show At the Movies. Siskel described it as "the single worst movie of 1984", saying it was shockingly bad, insensitive, cruel, boring, unfunny and cheaply made. He summed up by proposing that film encyclopedias "ought to have an entry called Bad Movie and the illustration ought to be a still photo from Slapstick of Another Kind... The best thing that could ever happen to this film is that it never be shown anywhere." Ebert concurred, describing the film as offensive, unsavory and painful.

In At Millennium's End: New Essays on the Work of Kurt Vonnegut, Kevin Alexander Boon said that the film "circumvents everything that is intelligent about Vonnegut's fiction" and that it is one of the worst adaptations of Vonnegut's work.

Leonard Maltin praised the performances of Jerry Lewis and Samuel Fuller, but described the film as "appalling".

Lewis was nominated for the Golden Raspberry Award for Worst Actor for his role in this film at the 5th Golden Raspberry Awards.

Nathan Rabin, writing for The A.V. Club, called the film "a crass violation of everything Vonnegut stood for".

The trailer for this film was featured in the 2020 compilation mixtape The Cult of AGFA Trailer Show.
