= John Parr (album) =

Studio album by John Parr
- Released: 1984
- Genre: Rock
- Length: 39:01
- Labels: Atlantic (North America); London (United Kingdom); Mercury (Rest of the world)
- Producers: John Parr; Pete Solley

John Parr chronology
John Parr (1984)	Running the Endless Mile (1986)

Singles from John Parr
- 1. "Naughty Naughty" Released: 1984; 2. "Magical" Released: 1985; 3. "Love Grammar" Released: 1985; 4. "Don't Leave Your Mark on Me" Released: 1986

Professional ratings
Review scores
Source	Rating
AllMusic	4/5 stars

John Parr is the debut album by John Parr, released in 1984. It contains 3 Billboard Top 100 songs: "Magical" which peaked at #73, "Love Grammar" at #89, and the biggest of the three, "Naughty Naughty", which peaked at #23 and was a top 10 AOR hit.

"St. Elmo's Fire (Man in Motion)" is included on the 1985 London Records issue of the album (#LONLP 12) in the UK. It hit number one on the Billboard Hot 100 on September 7, 1985, remaining there for two weeks. It was the main theme for the Joel Schumacher's 1985 film St. Elmo's Fire. The song also peaked at number six in the UK, Parr's home country and became a number-one hit for John Parr around the world and provided many awards and a Grammy nomination.

== Critical reception ==
Upon its release, Malcolm Dome of Kerrang! called the album "wonderful" and praised Parr as "a glowing addition to the AOR ranks". He added, "If you can get to grips with a man who takes the best from Meat Loaf, Foreigner and Roxy Music, then you will understand my fever over Parr."

== Track listing ==
All tracks are written by John Parr, except where noted.

No.	Title	Writer(s)	Length
1.	"Magical"	Meat Loaf; Parr	3:51
2.	"Naughty Naughty"		3:39
3.	"Love Grammar"		4:15
4.	"Treat Me Like an Animal"		4:27
5.	"She's Gonna Love You to Death"	Betsy Durkin Mathers; Parr	3:42
6.	"Revenge"		4:37
7.	"Heartbreaker"	Julia Downes; Parr	5:28
8.	"Somebody Stole My Thunder"		4:44
9.	"Don't Leave Your Mark on Me"	Downes; Parr	4:18
Total length:			39:01

London Records version
No.	Title	Writer(s)	Length
1.	"Magical"	Meat Loaf; Parr	3:51
2.	"Naughty Naughty"		3:39
3.	"Love Grammar"		4:15
4.	"Treat Me Like an Animal"		4:27
5.	"She's Gonna Love You to Death"	Mathers; Parr	3:42
6.	"St. Elmo's Fire (Man in Motion)"	David Foster; Parr	4:11
7.	"Revenge"		4:37
8.	"Heartbreaker"	Downes; Parr	5:28
9.	"Somebody Stole My Thunder"		4:44
10.	"Don't Leave Your Mark on Me"	Downes; Parr	4:18

== Personnel ==
- John Parr – lead vocals, lead guitar, African sounds
- Pete Solley – Hammond organ
- Christopher Marra – guitar
- Brad Lang – bass guitar (incorrectly listed as "Bruce Laing" on certain editions of the album)
- Colin Farley – bass guitar (tracks 3 and 7 only)
- John Cook – keyboards
- Richard Cottle – keyboards (tracks 3, 4, and 6 only)
- Johnathon J. Jeczalik – Fairlight synthesizer
- The Kick Horns – horns
- Graham Broad – drums, percussion
- Simon Phillips – drums (tracks 3 and 7 only)
- Chuck Kirkpatrick – backing vocals
- John Sambataro – backing vocals
- Steve Lukather - guitar
- David Paich - keyboards
- Steve Porcaro - keyboards

Production

- Mark Dodson – engineer
- Femi Jiya – engineer
- Geoff Lyth – engineer
- Ian Morais – engineer
- David Thoener – engineer
- John Verity – engineer
- John Parr – producer
- Pete Solley – producer
- David Foster – producer ("St. Elmo's Fire (Man in Motion)" only)
- Jimmy Starr – remastering

== Charts ==
=== Album ===
Chart (1985)	Peak position
US Billboard 200	48

=== Singles ===
Year	Single	Chart	Position
1984	Naughty Naughty	US Hot 100 (Billboard)	23
1984	Naughty Naughty	US Mainstream Rock Chart (Billboard)	6
1984	Naughty Naughty	UK Singles Chart	58
1985	Magical	US Hot 100 (Billboard)	73
1985	Magical	US Mainstream Rock Chart (Billboard)	11
1985	Love Grammar	US Hot 100 (Billboard)	89
