= Jeff Speakman =

American actor and martial artist (born 1958)

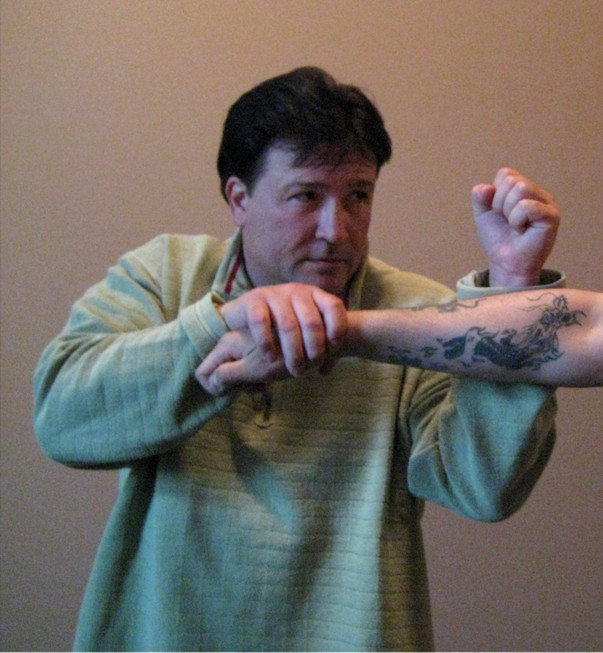
- Speakman in Moscow, 2008
- Born: Jeffrey F. Speakman; November 8, 1958 (age 67); Chicago, Illinois, U.S.
- Style: American Kenpo, Karate (Gōjū-ryū)
- Rank: 10th degree black belt in American Kenpo Karate; 9th degree black belt in Tenshi Goju Kai
- Years active: 1988–2006 (Acting)

Other information
- Occupation: Actor; Martial artist
- Website: jeffspeakman.com

Jeff Speakman (born November 8, 1958) is an American actor and a martial artist in the art of American Kenpo and Japanese Gōjū-ryū, earning black belts in each. Between 2008 and 2018, he was President of the International Kempo Federation. He is known for starring in the 1991 action film The Perfect Weapon.

== Early life ==
Speakman was born and raised in the suburbs of Chicago, Illinois, where he was a springboard diver at John Hersey High School and achieved All-American status. He graduated from Missouri Southern State College.

He has said that the television show Kung Fu got him interested in martial arts, and he began by studying the Okinawan martial art of Gōjū-ryū until achieving black belt rank. His instructor then recommended that if he was really intent in pursuing martial arts as a lifestyle, then he should go looking for Ed Parker, a friend of his master. Speakman sold his car to pay for the moving expenses and met Parker at one of the latter's tournaments. Speakman spent years training in American Kenpo under his principal instructor, Larry Tatum, as well as under the system's founder Parker.

Speakman received his first-degree black belt in American Kenpo in 1984. He was promoted to ninth degree in kenpo karate by Mills Crenshaw and Bob White and ninth in Gōjū-ryū by Lou Angel on July 2, 2013. He was promoted to tenth degree on July 9, 2022. He had started Gōjū-ryū in 1978.

== Career ==
Speakman started acting in 1988 and had his first main role in 1991 with the release of The Perfect Weapon, He followed this up with the feature film Street Knight. In the United Kingdom, this movie was released straight to video in 1993. Other action films followed, including The Expert and Deadly Outbreak.

== Filmography ==
=== Film and television credits ===
Year	Film	Role	Notes
1988	Side Roads	Joseph Velasco	Film and First Lead Role
1988	Slaughterhouse Rock	Cafe Patron	Film
1990	Lionheart	Mansion Security Man	Film
1991	The Perfect Weapon	Jeff Sanders	Film
1993	Street Knight	Jake Barrett	Film
1994	The Expert	John Lomax	Film
1995	Deadly Outbreak	Sergeant Dutton Hatfield	Film
1996	Timelock	McMasters	Film
1997	Escape From Atlantis	Matt Spencer	TV Movie
1997	Plato's Run	Dominick	Film
1998	Memorial Day	Edward Downey	Film
1998	Scorpio One	Jared Stone	Film
1999	Land of the Free	Frank Jennings	Film
1999	Hot Boyz	Master Keaton	Video
2000	Running Red	Greg / Gregori	Film (also Executive Producer)
2001	Blades Of The Sun	Unknown	Film
2002	Night Terror	Professor Eric Lang	Film
2004	The Gunman	Scott Sherwin	Film
2006	Striking Range (aka: Bloodlines)	Kilmer	Film

Sporting positions
Preceded by Olaf Bock	President of IKF; 2008–2018	Succeeded by Amatto Zaharia
