= Man with a Vision (album) =

Man With a Vision

Studio album by John Parr
- Released: 23 March 1992
- Genre: AOR
- Label: Music for Nations; Edelton; Blue Martin Records; Generation Records
- Producer: John Parr (tracks 1, 3, 5-12); John Wolff (track 2); Harold Faltermeyer (track 4)

John Parr chronology
| Running the Endless Mile (1986) | Man With a Vision (1992) | Under Parr (1996) |

Man with a Vision is the third studio album by John Parr, released in 1992. The majority of the album was produced by Parr, except "Man With a Vision", produced by John Wolff, and "Restless Heart", produced by Harold Faltermeyer. The album was released in the UK by Music for Nations, in Germany by Edelton, Switzerland by Blue Martin Records, and Austria and Scandinavia by Generation Records.

Two singles were released from the album, "Man with a Vision" and "It's Starting All Over Again". "Restless Heart" had been previously released for The Running Man soundtrack in 1987, and as a single in the UK and Germany in 1988. "Man with a Vision" was originally recorded by Seven in 1990, with Parr as producer.

Speaking to the Get Ready to Rock! webzine in 2011, Parr spoke of the litigation he suffered from in the 1990s:

"I was dead in the water long before Under Parr [Parr's 1996 studio album]. From the nineties onwards I was locked in the litigation. I was ducking and diving doing little deals here and there to try and stay afloat. All my income was frozen for almost twenty years so I had to really bob and weave. Man with a Vision was really a bunch of demos but as there were no deals on the table I was forced to release it through Blue Martin a small label in Switzerland. [After Under Parr], I walked away from music for the next ten years. It broke my heart. I was making records that only my family and friends heard - some of my best work I think, that nobody was going to hear. The guitar stayed untouched in the box for ten years and I never sang a note."

== Track listing ==
| No. | Title | Writer(s) | Length |
|---|---|---|---|
| 1. | "Wilderness Years" | John Parr | 1:33 |
| 2. | "Man With a Vision" | Parr, Keith McFarlane, Simon Lefevre | 3:59 |
| 3. | "It's Starting All Over Again" | Parr, Peter Goalby | 3:25 |
| 4. | "Restless Heart" | Harold Faltermeyer, Parr | 4:35 |
| 5. | "Ghost Driver" | Parr, Tom Whitlock | 4:10 |
| 6. | "Bedtime Story" | Betsy Durkin Matthes, Parr | 5:03 |
| 7. | "Come Out Fightin'" | Matthes, Parr | 5:16 |
| 8. | "Everytime" | Parr, Goalby | 4:54 |
| 9. | "Killer on the Sheets" | Parr | 3:47 |
| 10. | "Dirty Lovin'" | Parr, Mark Scott | 4:41 |
| 11. | "This Time" | Parr, Goalby | 5:16 |
| 12. | "Sarah" | Parr | 4:00 |

== Personnel ==
- John Parr – writer, producer, arranger and performer
- Richard Cottle – keyboards ("Wilderness Years") and saxophone ("Come Out Fightin")
- Paul Hodson – keyboards ("This Time", "It's Starting All Over Again" and "Everytime")
- John Cooke – piano ("Bedtime Story")
- Dave Lane – piano ("Dirty Lovin"), organ ("Ghost Driver")
- Harold Faltermeyer – keyboards ("Restless Heart")
- Peter Goalby – co-arranger and rhythm guitar ("This Time", It's Starting All Over Again" and "Everytime")
- Nick Robinson – harmonica ("Dirty Lovin")

== Chart performance ==
| Chart (1992) | Peak position |
|---|---|
| Austrian Albums Chart | 38 |
| Swiss Albums Chart | 37 |
