= The Expert (1995 film) =

- VHS release poster
- Directed by: Rick Avery; William Lustig
- Written by: Jill Gatsby; Max Allan Collins
- Produced by: Nicholas Barbaro; Andrew W. Garroni
- Starring: Jeff Speakman; James Brolin; Jim Varney
- Cinematography: Levie Isaacks
- Edited by: Bob Murawski
- Music by: Ashley Irwin
- Distributed by: New City Releasing
- Release date: April 6, 1995
- Running time: 92 minutes
- Country: United States
- Language: English

The Expert is a 1995 American action thriller film about an ex-special forces trainer who decides to exact revenge on the murderer of his sister after his death sentence is commuted. The film was directed by Rick Avery and William Lustig (who was uncredited) and stars Jeff Speakman, Jim Varney and James Brolin.

== Plot ==
John Lomax is an ex-Special Forces trainer whose sister is attacked and murdered by serial killer Martin Kagan. Kagan represents himself at trial, calling in testimony from Dr. Alice Barnes that the murders were committed by Martin Mirman, one of Martin Kagan's other personalities. He is nevertheless sentenced to electrocution. John Lomax breaks into the prison where Kagan is being held to seek his own justice at the same time that Kagan is conducting a prison break of his own.

== Cast ==
- Jeff Speakman as John Lomax
- Michelle Nagy as Jenny Lomax
- Alex Datcher as Dr. Alice Barnes
- Jim Varney as "Snake"
- James Brolin as Warden Munsy
- Elizabeth Gracen as Liz Pierce
- Red West as Judge
- Wolfgang Bodison as Don Mason
- Ted Raimi as Jerry's Friend (uncredited)
- Michael Shaner as Martin Kagan
- Trent Walker as Bobby Lee Hazen
- Jophery Brown as Joe Himes

== Production ==
Larry Cohen did some uncredited work on the script. He later recalled:

I only did a little work on The Expert. My daughter, Jill Gatsby, wrote that movie. I just got the job for her, that’s all. I really had nothing to do with the film, so I couldn’t comment on it. I saw The Expert, but I don’t remember much. I thought it was passable. The movie was supposed to be a remake of Brute Force but it wasn’t very good. Once again, somebody fucked around with the script.
