= International Kempo Federation =

Kempo federation

- Jurisdiction: International
- Abbreviation: IKF
- Founded: 2002
- Headquarters: Nice, France
- President: (Romania) Amatto Zaharia

Official website
- www.olympickempo.com

The International Kempo Federation (IKF) is the administrative body for kempo in the world, with over 100 member countries. IKF was founded in 2002 in Budapest, Hungary, being currently headquartered in Nice, France.

== Presidents ==
- Olaf Bock, Germany, 2002–2008
- Jeff Speakman, United States, 2008–2018
- Amatto Zaharia, Romania, 2018–

== Executive committee ==
President

- (Romania) Amatto Zaharia

Vice-presidents

- (Japan) Yoshiji Soeno
- (Hungary) Ádám Lacza

CEO public relations

- (Portugal) Bruno Rebelo

Head of referees

- (Netherlands) Edward Hartman

Executive members

- (United States) Robert E. Zingg
- (Slovakia) Róbert Szayka

Directors

- (United States) Robert E. Zingg
- (Russia) Ruslan Akumov
- (Indonesia) Eko Puji Raharjo
- (Argentina) Carlos Miguel Wollman
- (Sweden) Martin Jonsson

Technical advisors

- (Bulgaria) Velin Hadjolov
- (Azerbaijan) Rauf Ibrahimov

== Members ==
Asia			
Afghanistan	Bangladesh	India	Indonesia
Iraq	Iran	Japan	Kazakhstan
Kuwait	Kyrgyzstan	Mongolia	Nepal
Pakistan	People's Republic of China	Syria	Yemen

Europe			
Armenia	Azerbaijan	Belarus	Belgium
Bosnia and Herzegovina	Bulgaria	Croatia	Estonia
France	Georgia	Germany	Hungary
Italy	Latvia	Lithuania	Moldova
Montenegro	Netherlands	Northern Cyprus	Poland
Portugal	Romania	Russia	Serbia
Slovakia	Spain	Sweden	Turkey
Ukraine	United Kingdom		

Panamerica			
Argentina	Bolivia	Brazil	Canada
Colombia	Dominican Republic	Mexico	United States
Venezuela

Africa			
Algeria	Cameroon	Democratic Republic of the Congo	Egypt
Morocco	Nigeria	Tunisia	

Oceania
Australia

== Events ==
- IKF World Kempo Championships 21st 2025 / 22nd 2026 in Turkey
- Continental Kempo Championships
- World Kempo Cups
- International Events
- Professional IKF Gallas
- International Referee Courses

== Black Belts Society ==
=== 9 Dan ===
- (United States) Jeff Speakman
- (United States) Benny Urquidez

=== 8 Dan ===
- (United States) Robert E. Zingg
- (Romania) Amatto Zaharia
- (Germany) Olaf Bock
- (Netherlands) Edward Hartman
- (France) Eric La Rocca
- (Portugal) Bruno Rebelo

=== 7 Dan ===
- (Bulgaria) Velin Hadjolov
- (Indonesia) Ahmad Yusuf
- (Russia) Ruslan Akumov
- (Hungary) Rudolf Várszegi

== See also ==
- Kenpō
