= Two Hearts (John Parr song) =

1986 song by John Parr

Single by John Parr

from the album American Anthem (soundtrack) and Running the Endless Mile
- Released: 22 May 1986
- Length: 4:34 (edited version); 6:06 (extended/album version)
- Label: London; Mercury; Atlantic
- Songwriter: John Parr
- Producer: John Parr

John Parr singles chronology
"Don't Leave Your Mark on Me" (1986)	"Two Hearts" (1986)	"Rock 'n' Roll Mercenaries" (1986)

Music video
- "Two Hearts" on YouTube

"Two Hearts" is a song by English singer and musician John Parr, released in 1986 as a single from the soundtrack of the 1986 American sports drama film American Anthem. The song, written and produced by Parr, was also included on Parr's second studio album Running the Endless Mile (1986).

== Background ==
"Two Hearts" was released as a single from the soundtrack of the 1986 American sports drama film American Anthem. Although Parr had scored a worldwide hit in 1985 with "St. Elmo's Fire (Man in Motion)" from the soundtrack of the film of the same name, "Two Hearts" was a commercial failure and American Anthem a box office flop. Parr told Billboard at the end of 1986, "I don't think 'Two Hearts' got much attention in America. I find a lot of people never even heard it before. People say, 'Hey, that would make a great single,' and then I tell them it was a single. It's just that the movie died and took the single with it."

== Music video ==
The song's music video was directed by Nigel Dick. It features footage of Parr and a backing band performing the song on a stage, interspersed with clips from American Anthem. The video achieved breakout rotation on MTV, and peaked at number 23 on the Cash Box Top 30 Music Videos chart in August 1986.

== Critical reception ==
Upon its release as a single in the US, Billboard felt the song was "close enough to the sound" of "St. Elmo's Fire (Man in Motion)" and added, "With fanfares like this, it has to be movie music." In a review of the song's music video, Lydia Kolb of The Paducah Sun praised the video for being "handled the way it should be" with the "movie footage and music [being] edited in such a way that each compliments the other". She added, "When the music has a wild horn solo, we see movie action which is played almost to the beat of the music. When we have gentle guitar solos and lyrics, we see the slower paced, more loving scenes from the movie. Normally we see selected or random clips just thrown in for advertisement. This is handled in such a way as to ask which came first, the video or the movie?"

== Track listing ==
7–inch single (UK, European, South Africa, Australasia, Ecuador and Canada)

1. "Two Hearts" (Edited Version) – 4:34
2. "Two Hearts" (Extended Version) – 6:06

7–inch single (US)

1. "Two Hearts" (Extended Version) – 6:06
2. "Two Hearts" (Edit) – 4:34

12–inch single (UK, Europe and Australasia)

1. "Two Hearts" (Extended Version) – 6:06
2. "Two Hearts" (Edited Version) – 4:34
3. "Somebody Stole My Thunder" – 4:44

12–inch double-pack single (with free "St. Elmo's Fire" single) (UK)

1. "Two Hearts" (Extended Version) – 6:06
2. "Two Hearts" (Edited Version) – 4:34
3. "Somebody Stole My Thunder" – 4:44
4. "St. Elmo's Fire (Man in Motion)" – 4:08
5. "Treat Me Like an Animal" – 4:28
6. "Making Love with a Stranger" – 3:36

12–inch promotional single (US)

1. "Two Hearts" (Edit) – 4:34
2. "Two Hearts" (Extended Version) – 6:06

== Personnel ==
"Two Hearts"

- John Parr – lead vocals, backing vocals, guitar, horn arrangements
- Chris Marra – guitar
- Richard Cottle – horns, keyboards, saxophone, horn arrangements
- Brad Lang – bass
- Graham Broad – drums, percussion
- Roddy Matthews – backing vocals

Production

- John Parr – producer (all tracks except "St. Elmo's Fire (Man in Motion)")
- Peter Hammond – mixing and engineering on "Two Hearts"
- David Foster – producer on "St. Elmo's Fire (Man in Motion)"

== Charts ==
Chart (1986)	Peak position
UK Singles Chart	104
