= Man with a Vision (song) =

1990 song by John Parr, Keith McFarlane and Simon LeFevre; released by Seven

"Man With a Vision"

Single by Seven
- B-side: "Just Close Your Eyes"; "Stranger (In The Night)"
- Released: June 1990
- Recorded: 1990
- Length: 4:06
- Label: Polydor
- Songwriter(s): John Parr: Keith McFarlane; Simon LeFevre
- Producer(s): John Parr

Seven singles chronology
"Inside Love" (1990)	"Man With a Vision" (1990)

"Man With a Vision" is a song written by John Parr, Keith McFarlane and Simon LeFevre, which was first recorded and released by the English band Seven as their second non-album single in 1990. In 1992, Parr released his own version as a single from his album of the same name.

== Seven version ==
Seven signed to Polydor Records in 1989 and released two singles on the label in 1990, with "Man with a Vision" being the second single. Like its predecessor, "Inside Love", "Man with a Vision" was produced by John Parr. It peaked at number 91 in the UK and remained in the top 100 for two weeks. The limited commercial success of "Inside Love" and "Man With a Vision" led to the band being dropped by Polydor. They split shortly after due to a series of internal struggles and disagreements.

=== Track listing ===
7-inch single

1. "Man with a Vision" – 4:06
2. "Just Close Your Eyes" – 2:51

12-inch single

1. "Man with a Vision" (Extended Version) – 5:59
2. "Man with a Vision" (7" Version) – 4:06
3. "Just Close Your Eyes" – 2:51

CD single

1. "Man with a Vision" (7" Version) – 4:06
2. "Just Close Your Eyes" – 2:51
3. "Man with a Vision" (Extended Version) – 5:59
4. "Stranger (In the Night)" - 4:53

=== Charts ===
Chart (1990)	Peak position
UK Singles Chart	91

== John Parr version ==
"Man with a Vision"

Single by John Parr

from the album Man with a Vision
- B-side: "Forever's Not For Everyone"; "Come Out Fightin'"
- Released: February 1992
- Length: 4:00
- Label: Edelton
- Songwriter(s): John Parr; Keith McFarlane; Simon LeFevre
- Producer(s): John Parr

John Parr singles chronology
"Westward Ho" (1991)	"Man with a Vision" (1992)	"It's Startin' All Over Again" (1992)

In 1992, English singer and musician John Parr released his own version of "Man with a Vision" as the lead single from his third studio album, Man with a Vision. It peaked at number 111 in the UK Singles Chart.

=== Track listings ===
7-inch single

1. "Man with a Vision" - 4:00
2. "Forever's Not for Everyone" - 4:37

12" single

1. "Man with a Vision" - 4:00
2. "Forever's Not for Everyone" - 4:37
3. "Come Out Fightin'" - 5:14

CD single

1. "Man with a Vision" - 4:00
2. "Forever's Not for Everyone" - 4:37
3. "Come Out Fightin'" - 5:14

=== Charts ===
Chart (1992)	Peak position
UK Singles Chart (OCC)	111
