= John Wolff =

American legal scholar

John Wolff (1906–2005) served as an adjunct professor of law at Georgetown University Law Center for 44 years until his death on December 7, 2005 In addition to teaching, he worked for the government and was a consultant on Foreign and International Law in Washington, D.C., and published articles in numerous American and German legal publications. He was a lieutenant colonel in the Judge Advocate General's Corps of the U.S. Army and a deputy to the U.S. representative to the United Nations War Crimes Commission. He also served as an advisor on international and foreign law to the U.S. Department of Justice and served as deputy chairman of the Council on International Law of the Federal Bar Association.

He graduated with an LL.D. from the University of Heidelberg and later received an LL.M. from Columbia University. In addition to Georgetown, Professor Wolff lectured at the Universities of Munich and Muenster in Germany as well as the Law Society of Berlin.

Professor Wolff received three awards from Georgetown University. In 1981, he received the Vicennial Medal in recognition of his distinguished 20 years of service. In 1988, he received the Charles Fahy Distinguished Adjunct Professor Award. In 2003, he received a Certificate of Appreciation in recognition of his loyalty and commitment to Georgetown University and 42 years of outstanding teaching.

In 2004, Georgetown permanently honored Professor Wolff through dedication of the John Wolff International and Comparative Law Library.
