= Naughty Naughty (John Parr song) =

Single by John Parr

from the album John Parr
- B-side: "Revenge"
- Released: November 1984
- Genre: Rock
- Length: 3:36
- Label: Atlantic
- Songwriter: John Parr

John Parr singles chronology
| "Naughty Naughty" (1984) | "Magical" (1985) |

"Naughty Naughty" is the debut single by English rock musician John Parr, released in November 1984 as the lead single from his debut self-titled studio album. The song was Parr's first U.S. top 40 hit record, reaching No. 23 on the Hot 100.

== Music video ==
The music video begins with Parr quitting his job as an auto mechanic, after being chewed out by his boss for spending time admiring the Rolls Royce he's fixing. Parr drives recklessly through the streets of San Francisco, with his girlfriend by his side, played by Lisa Rinna, later of Melrose Place.

When Parr attempts to put his hand up his girl's skirt, she smacks him, exits the vehicle at a stoplight, and rips off a gold chain which Parr had previously given her.

Parr is then seen again recklessly driving through the city, this time in the Rolls Royce he was fixing earlier. He is now with several women who are constantly touching him in a seductive fashion. He briefly stops at a motel to continue intimacy with the women, and then returns to driving, again with the women touching him.

Eventually, Parr opens his eyes, and it is revealed that the romp through the city with the multiple women has been a daydream. His girlfriend is still standing outside his car at the same intersection, now with a forgiving look on her face. She gets back in, the two make up, and the car is shown elevating in the air, over the Golden Gate Bridge, presumably a metaphor for a sexual encounter which finally takes place.

== Charts ==
| Chart (1984–85) | Peak position |
|---|---|
| Canada Top Singles (RPM) | 84 |
| US Billboard Hot 100 | 23 |
| US Billboard Top Rock Tracks | 6 |
| UK Singles (Official Charts Company) | 58 |
