= Patrick Goldstein =

American film critic

- Born: United States
- Occupations: Film critic; columnist; writer

Patrick Goldstein is an American former film critic and columnist for the Los Angeles Times who wrote about movies in a column titled The Big Picture. Colleague Tom O'Neil described him as the newspaper's "chief Oscarologist" as his column focused largely on the doings of the Academy Awards. Goldstein and O'Neil had a long rivalry concerning the outcome of annual Academy Awards.

Goldstein left the paper in 2012 after a change in management.
