= Restless Heart (John Parr song) =

Single by John Parr

from the album Man with a Vision
- B-side: "Crystal Eye"
- Released: 1988
- Length: 4:20
- Label: Trax Music Ltd. (UK); CBS Records (Germany)
- Songwriters: Harold Faltermeyer; John Parr
- Producer: Harold Faltermeyer

John Parr singles chronology
"Don't Worry 'Bout Me" (1986)	"Restless Heart" (1988)	"Always on my Mind" (1990)

"Restless Heart" (a.k.a. "Running Away with You (Restless Heart)") is a song by the English singer/musician John Parr, which was released in 1988 as a soundtrack single from the 1987 feature film The Running Man. It was written by Parr and German musician/composer Harold Faltermeyer, and produced by Faltermeyer. The power ballad would later be included on Parr's third studio album Man with a Vision, released in 1992.

== Background ==
"Restless Heart" was intentionally written for The Running Man soundtrack. The song originally used the same title as the film and had a different set of lyrics, but this was changed at the request of the film's producers. Parr told Simon Mayo in 1988, "The lyrics originally went 'Would you bet your life on a running man?', but [the producers] decided it was too close to the film and too downbeat. And they'd got paranoid about the title. Instead, the new version tells the story of what happens when the film finishes." Some of the lyrics (including "No pain no gain" and "You hit the right spot") are variations on lines of dialogue in the film.

Parr and Faltermeyer wrote and recorded "Restless Heart" in three days. The pair had previously intended to collaborate on a music project for an unspecified television series, but Parr was unavailable at the time.

== Release ==
"Restless Heart" was played over ending credits of The Running Man, which received its theatrical release in the US on 13 November 1987. With the film's upcoming theatrical release in the UK on 23 September 1988, "Restless Heart" was released as a single from the soundtrack. Parr had hoped "Restless Heart" would re-establish him as a chart act in the UK and allow him to go on tour there, but the song failed to enter the UK Singles Chart. Parr told Mayo in 1988, "People will only come and see you if you've got a hit. If this record takes off, I'll be on the stage as soon as I can."

== Promotion ==
A music video was filmed to promote the single. The scenes featuring Parr were shot in East London by Femme Fatale, while clips from The Running Man were also added to the video. Speaking of the video, Parr told the Daily Record in 1988, "It [is] the best video I have ever made. It features brilliant clips from The Running Man and I really do appear to be in the film. I'm very proud of it."

== Critical reception ==
Upon its release as a single in the UK, Phil Wilding of Kerrang! felt "Restless Heart" did not match Parr's 1985 hit "St. Elmo's Fire (Man in Motion)", but believed it would still be a hit. He wrote, "John bounces back to par with a straight gear shift run through number that will sell like hell as it's the theme tune to Running Man. His voice seems to have mellowed with age, and even though he's been ignored for years Radio One will lust upon this with tongues lolling frantically." Andrew Hirst of the Huddersfield Daily Examiner praised it as a "powerful movie anthem" and believed it to be "far better" than "St. Elmo's Fire (Man in Motion)". He added, "This release has cut away the bland gristle from American rock to cook up a rare fillet that deserves full Radio One airplay."

Andy Nixon of the News and Star noted a lack of originality, calling it a "tame piece of American rock spiced up only with the Yorkshire lad's excellent vocals". Mark Barden of the Dorset Evening Echo recommended readers "give it a miss" as "only a typically sturdy chorus keep[s] it afloat". Barry Young of The Press and Journal gave the single a one out of five star rating and wrote, "Terribly dramatic, with Parr straining to shout out his feelings of deep desire."

In 2014, Stephen Daultrey of Louder included the song in his list of "Ten Amazing 80s Action Movie Power Ballads". He described it as "one of the most sincere, embracive tear-rock ballads ever penned", with Parr "croon[ing] with heartfelt purpose".

== Track listing ==
7-inch single

1. "Restless Heart" – 4:20
2. "Crystal Eye" – 3:20

12-inch and CD single

1. "Restless Heart" (Extended Version) – 5:51
2. "Crystal Eye" – 3:25
3. "Restless Heart" (Single Version) – 4:17

CD Single (German release)

1. "Restless Heart" (Single Version)" – 4:17
2. "Crystal Eye" – 3:24
3. "Restless Heart" (Extended Version) – 5:53

== Personnel ==
- John Parr – lead vocals, guitar, producer of "Crystal Eye"
- Harold Faltermeyer – keyboards, producer of "Restless Heart"
