= Albert Magnoli =

American film director, screenwriter and editor

- Born: 1953 or 1954 (age 72–73)
- Education: University of Southern California (BFA)
- Occupations: Film director, Screenwriter, Film editor
- Years active: 1979–present

Albert Magnoli (born c. 1954) is an American film director, screenwriter and editor best known for directing the films Purple Rain, Tango & Cash (replacement director), Street Knight, and American Anthem. Magnoli also served as editor of the 1984 film Reckless.

== Career ==
Magnoli graduated from the USC School of Cinema-Television in 1981.

In 1989, Magnoli briefly (from February to November) served as the manager of musical artist Prince.

== Accolades ==
In 2019, Magnoli's film Purple Rain was selected by the Library of Congress for preservation in the United States National Film Registry for being "culturally, historically, or aesthetically significant".

== Filmography ==
- 1979: Jazz (short film)
- 1984: Reckless (editor)
- 1984: Purple Rain
- 1986: American Anthem
- 1987: "Never Enough" (music video for Patty Smyth)
- 1987: Sign o' the Times (additional footage, uncredited)
- 1989: "Batdance" (music video for Prince)
- 1989: "Scandalous" (music video for Prince)
- 1989: Tango & Cash (replaced Andrei Konchalovsky, uncredited)
- 1989: "Partyman" (music video for Prince)
- 1993: Street Knight
- 1993: Born to Run (TV Movie)
- 1997: Dark Planet
- 1997: Nash Bridges season 2, episode 23: "Deliverance"
