= John Parr =

British musician (born 1952)

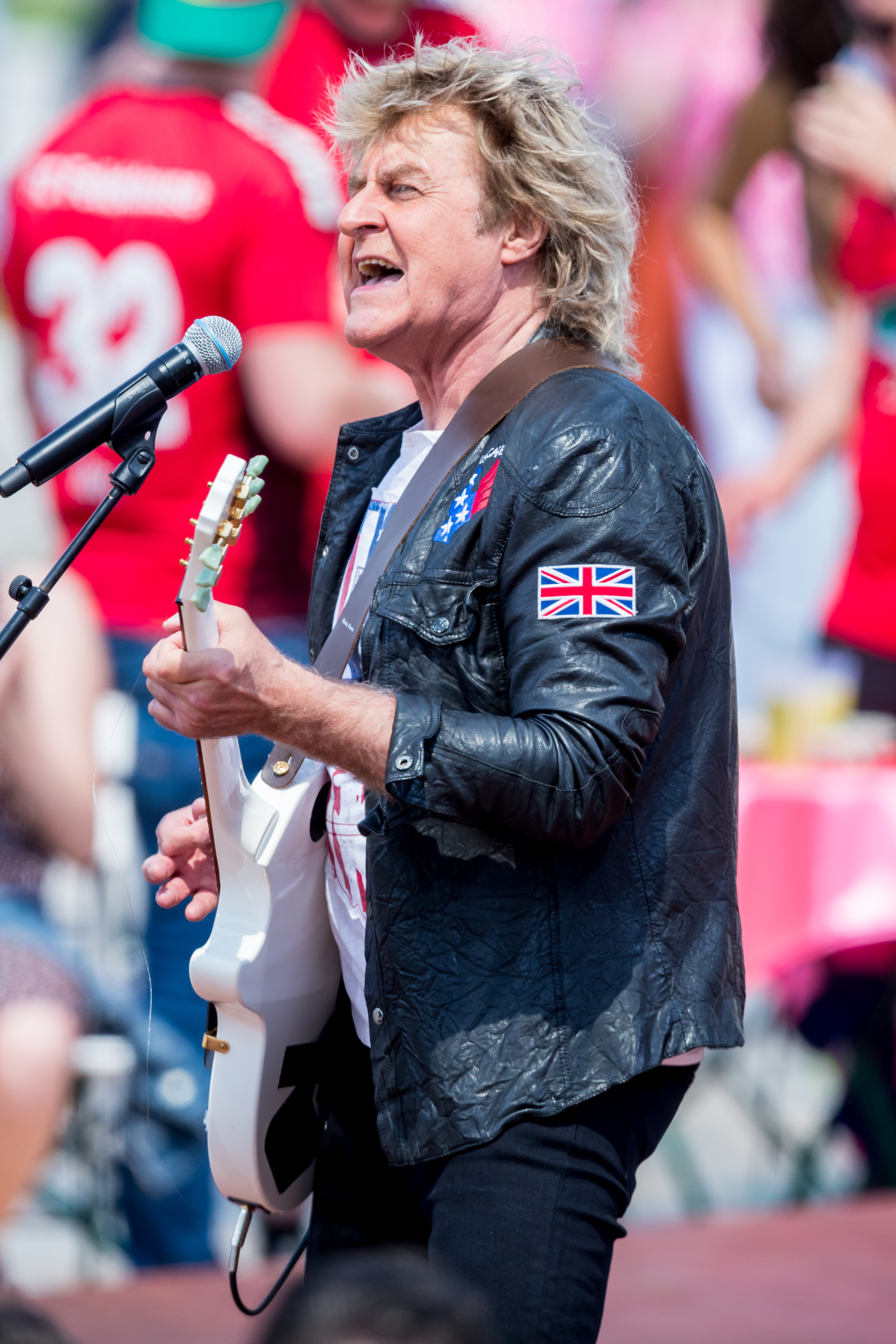
- Parr performing in 2023

Background information
- Born: John Stephen Parr; 18 November 1952 (age 73); Worksop, Nottinghamshire, England
- Origin: Sherwood Forest, England
- Genre: Rock
- Occupations: Musician; singer; songwriter; filmmaker
- Instruments: Vocals; guitar; bass guitar; piano; keyboards
- Years active: 1964–present
- Website: www.johnparr.net

John Stephen Parr (born 18 November 1952) is an English musician best known for his 1985 single "St. Elmo's Fire (Man in Motion)" for the 1985 film St. Elmo's Fire, charting at No.1 in the US and No.6 in the UK, and for his 1984 U.S. No.6 rock single "Naughty Naughty". He has written and performed 12 major motion picture theme songs, including the themes for Three Men and a Baby and The Running Man. Parr was nominated for a Grammy award for "St. Elmo's Fire" in 1985.

== Career ==
"Naughty Naughty" was Parr's first US Top 40 hit record, reaching No.23 on the Billboard Hot 100 in 1985. In 1985, Parr toured with his band "The Business" supporting Toto, his first show with Toto at Carowinds Paladium (Charlotte, North Carolina), and playing 10,000-seat venues across America. By the end of the tour, David Foster asked Parr to record a song for the film St. Elmo's Fire. Parr and Foster wrote "St. Elmo's Fire" in honour of wheelchair athlete and activist Rick Hansen; it became the theme to St. Elmo's Fire (a "Brat Pack" film unrelated to Hansen's life or achievements).

Parr later wrote "Under a Raging Moon" with Julia Downes for Roger Daltrey, a song that paid tribute to Keith Moon and told the story of the Who.

Parr was soon singing with Marilyn Martin on the song "Through the Night", from the Quicksilver soundtrack (1986). Parr wrote and produced further tracks for Martin's debut album, including the hit "Night Moves". A year later, he wrote and sang the title songs "The Minute I Saw You", from Three Men and a Baby soundtrack, and the power ballad "Restless Heart" (a.k.a. "Running Away with You (Restless Heart)"), from The Running Man soundtrack (this song was re-released on the album Man with a Vision). Parr them contributed to Meat Loaf's album Blind Before I Stop with the hit duet "Rock 'n' Roll Mercenaries".

In 1989, Parr performed "The Best a Man Can Get" for the Gillette Super Bowl XXIII commercial, which he co-wrote with composer Jake Holmes. He released a recording of the song as "The Best" in 2013.

On 20 July 2007, Parr and his band opened for Bryan Adams at the Keepmoat Stadium in Parr's home town Doncaster.

In 2012, Parr released a revised version of "St. Elmo's Fire" entitled "Tim Tebow's Fire". It included the following lyrics: "You know I’m out there/Down on one knee/A prisoner/And I'm tryin' to break free".

=== Filmmaker ===
Parr wrote and produced "Road To Damascus" which was considered for Best Live Action Short Film at the Academy Awards in 2004. In 2022, Parr made the documentary film Unconquered about injured soldiers and their recovery which won 170 awards at festivals around the world. Parr's 2025 film A Pack of Five was screened at the Chinese Theatre in Hollywood at the Beverly Hills Film Festival and qualified for BAFTA.

== Discography ==
=== Studio albums ===
- John Parr (1984)
- Running the Endless Mile (1986)
- Man with a Vision (1992)
- Under Parr (1996)
- The Mission (2012)

=== Live albums ===
- Letter to America (2011)

=== Soundtrack albums ===
- Paris (1989)

=== Singles ===
Year	Title	Peak chart positions				Album
Year	Title	UK	US	US Rock	AUS	Album
1984	"Naughty Naughty"	58	23	6	—	John Parr
1985	"Magical"	—	73	28	—	John Parr
1985	"St. Elmo's Fire"	6	1	2	4	St. Elmo's Fire soundtrack
1985	"Love Grammar"	—	89	—	—	John Parr
1986	"Don't Leave Your Mark on Me"	—	—	—	—	John Parr
1986	"Rock 'n' Roll Mercenaries" (with Meat Loaf)	31	—	—	—	Blind Before I Stop
1986	"Blame It on the Radio"	—	88	—	—	Running the Endless Mile
1986	"Two Hearts"	104	—	—	—	Running the Endless Mile
1986	"Running the Endless Mile"	—	—	—	—	Running the Endless Mile
1986	"Don't Worry 'Bout Me"	—	—	—	—	Running the Endless Mile
1988	"Restless Heart"	—	—	—	—	The Running Man soundtrack
1990	"Always on my Mind"	—	—	—	—	Butterbrot soundtrack
1991	"Westward Ho"	—	—	—	—	Go Trabi Go soundtrack
1992	"Man with a Vision"	—	—	—	—	Man with a Vision
1992	"It's Startin' All Over Again"	—	—	—	—	Man with a Vision
1994	"The River Runs Deep"	—	—	—	—	Under Parr
1996	"Size of the Boat"	—	—	—	—	Under Parr
1996	"Secrets"	—	—	—	—	Under Parr
2006	"St. Elmo's Fire" (re-recording)	81	—	—	—	Non-album single
2006	"New Horizon" (remix of "St. Elmo's Fire (Man in Motion)" as "John Parr vs. Tommyknockers")	43	—	—	—	Non-album single
2007	"Walking Out of the Darkness"	155	—	—	—	Non-album single
2019	"The Minute I Saw You"	—	—	—	—	Non-album single

Various Artists The Anti-Heroin Project. Charity Single produced by Charles Foskett.

Guest appearances: John Parr, Elkie Brooks, Bonnie Tyler, Nik Kershaw, Holly Johnson, Kim Wilde, Hazel O'Connor, Cliff Richard, Robin Gibb, Mike Peters and others.

Year	Single	UK Chart
1986	"Live-In World" (The Anti-Heroin Project)	142
