= St. Elmo's Fire (Man in Motion) =

1985 single by John Parr

Single by John Parr

from the album St. Elmo's Fire (soundtrack) and John Parr
- B-side: "Treat Me Like an Animal"; "Somebody Stole My Thunder"; "One Love" (instrumental); "Georgetown"
- Released: 13 June 1985
- Genre: Rock; pop rock
- Length: 4:08
- Label: Atlantic
- Songwriters: David Foster; John Parr
- Producer: David Foster

John Parr singles chronology
"Magical" (1985)	"St. Elmo's Fire (Man in Motion)" (1985)	"Love Grammar" (1985)

Music video
- "St. Elmo's Fire (Man in Motion)" on YouTube

"St. Elmo's Fire (Man in Motion)" is a song by British singer John Parr that is the theme song from the 1985 film St. Elmo's Fire. It reached No. 1 on the US Billboard Hot 100 chart on 7 September 1985, remaining there for two weeks. The record peaked at No. 6 in the United Kingdom, Parr's home country. The song yielded Parr a Grammy nomination as well.

== Background and writing ==
"St. Elmo's Fire (Man in Motion)" was written by John Parr and David Foster. Foster had been impressed by Parr's song "Naughty Naughty" and invited him to perform the title track for the St. Elmo's Fire film. Originally, another song was chosen which Parr disliked. "That song sounded like Fame II or Flashdance II," Parr later said. "I thought the movie was supposed to have more class than that. It was a regurgitated song, and I didn't really want to sing it."

Foster showed Parr a news clip about the Canadian athlete Rick Hansen, who at the time was going around the world in his wheelchair to raise awareness for spinal cord injuries. His journey was called the Man in Motion Tour. Parr decided to help the campaign by writing words that would fit vaguely with the film, but which directly referenced Hansen's efforts.

The song was created and edited within 24 hours. According to Parr, he and Foster wrote "St. Elmo's Fire (Man in Motion)" "between 2 and 4 on Friday afternoon". Joel Schumacher, the director of the film, had given Parr rough guidelines for the lyrics. "He wanted a song about determination," Parr recalled. "He wanted a song about kids who are growing up and have to make decisions about what to do with their lives. That's what the movie is about." Parr added, "In the movie, St. Elmo's is a bar. But to me, St. Elmo's Fire is a magical thing glowing in the sky that holds destiny to someone. It's mystical and sacred. It's where paradise lies, like the end of the rainbow."

== Personnel ==
- John Parr – guitar, vocals
- David Foster, Steve Porcaro, David Paich – keyboards
- Steve Lukather – guitar
- Carlos Vega – drums
- Jerry Hey – trumpet
- Bill Reichenbach Jr. – trombone
- David Amato, Richard Page – backing vocals

== Charts ==
=== Weekly charts ===
Chart (1985)	Peak position
Australia (Kent Music Report)	4
Austria (Ö3 Austria Top 40)	8
Belgium (Ultratop 50 Flanders)	12
Canada Retail Singles (The Record)	3
Canada Top Singles (RPM)	1
Canada Adult Contemporary (RPM)	1
Europe (European Hot 100 Singles)	6
Ireland (IRMA)	5
Netherlands (Dutch Top 40)	19
Netherlands (Single Top 100)	22
New Zealand (Recorded Music NZ)	5
Norway (VG-lista)	3
South Africa (Springbok Radio)	2
Sweden (Sverigetopplistan)	4
Switzerland (Schweizer Hitparade)	4
UK Singles (Official Charts)	6
US Billboard Hot 100	1
US Adult Contemporary (Billboard)	16
US Mainstream Rock (Billboard)	2
US Cash Box Top 100	1
West Germany (GfK)	6
Zimbabwe (ZIMA)	1

Chart (2026)	Peak position
Poland (Polish Airplay Top 100)	57

=== Year-end charts ===
Chart (1985)	Rank
Australia (Kent Music Report)	57
Belgium (Ultratop)	75
Canada Top Singles (RPM)	14
US Billboard Hot 100	18
US Cash Box	6
West Germany (Media Control)	65

Chart (1986)	Rank
South Africa (Springbok Radio)	16

== Certifications ==
Region	Certification	Certified units/sales
Canada (Music Canada)	Gold	50,000^{^}
United Kingdom (BPI)	Silver	250,000^{^}
^{^} Shipments figures based on certification alone.

== In popular culture ==
In 2012, Parr re-recorded the song with new lyrics to honor Tim Tebow of the Denver Broncos. The re-recorded song is called "Tim Tebow's Fire". Parr told Denver FOX affiliate KDVR that he "was inspired by Tim Tebow so I wanted to modify the lyrics...in his honor of the way that he lives his life as being a great example".

In 2017, the song was heard in the short film Deadpool: No Good Deed.

In 2020–21, during Conan's stint at the Largo Theater, the song was parodied.

The song re-entered the UK Singles Chart in 2023 when it was featured on an advert for Virgin Media.
