= Drama League Awards =

Annual awards for theater in North America

The Drama League Awards, created in 1922, honor distinguished productions and performances both on Broadway and Off-Broadway, in addition to recognizing exemplary career achievements in theatre, musical theatre, and directing. Each May, the awards are presented by The Drama League at the Annual Awards Luncheon with performers, directors, producers, and Drama League members in attendance. The Drama League membership comprises the entire theater community, including award-winning actors, designers, directors, playwrights, producers, industry veterans, critics and theater-going audiences from across the U.S.

The Drama League Awards are the oldest awards honoring theater in North America. The awards were established in 1922, and formalized in 1935. Katharine Cornell was the recipient of the first Distinguished Performance Award in 1935. Seven competitive awards are presented: Outstanding Production of a Play, Outstanding Production of a Musical, Outstanding Revival of a Play, Outstanding Revival of a Musical, the Distinguished Performance Award, and, as of 2022, Outstanding Direction of a Play and Outstanding Direction of a Musical. The Distinguished Performance Award is presented to one performer every year, and the recipient can only receive the award once in his or her career. The Drama League also bestow three special honors at the awards ceremony: Distinguished Achievement in Musical Theater, Unique Contribution to the Theater, and The Founders Award for Excellence in Directing. The award statues are designed by New York firm Society Awards.

== Categories of awards ==
- Outstanding Production of a Play
- Outstanding Production of a Musical
- Outstanding Revival of a Play
- Outstanding Revival of a Musical
- Outstanding Direction of a Play (added in 2022)
- Outstanding Direction of a Musical (added in 2022)
- Distinguished Performance

Additionally, an honorary award may be given in the following categories:

- Distinguished Achievement in Musical Theatre
- Unique Contribution to the Theatre
- The Founders Award for Excellence in Directing

== List of winners ==
The Distinguished Performance Award, originally known as the Delia Austrian Medal, was first presented in 1935, to Katharine Cornell for Romeo and Juliet. The first recipient of the Founders Award for Excellence in Directing was Daniel J. Sullivan in 2000. Actor Yul Brynner was the first recipient of the Distinguished Achievement in Musical Theatre award in 1985. The Unique Contribution to the Theatre Award was first bestowed in 1982 to the New York Production of Nicholas Nickelby: Bernard Jacobs, Gerald Schoenfeld, James M. Nederlander, Elizabeth McCann, and Nelle Nugent.

Winners 2025–2026

Source: BroadwayWorld.com

| Category | Winner |
|---|---|
| Distinguished Performance | Joshua Henry for Ragtime |
| Outstanding Production of a Musical | Mexodus |
| Outstanding Production of a Play | Liberation |
| Outstanding Revival of a Musical | Ragtime |
| Outstanding Revival of a Play | Death of a Salesman |
| Outstanding Direction of a Musical | Lear deBessonet for Ragtime |
| Outstanding Direction of a Play | Joe Mantello for Death of a Salesman and Little Bear Ridge Road |
| Contribution to the Theatre Award | Kamilah Forbes |
| Distinguished Achievement in Musical Theatre Award | Caissie Levy |
| Founders Award for Excellence in Directing | David Cromer |
| Gratitude Award | Scott Ellis |

Winners 2024–2025

Source: Vogue.com

| Category | Winner |
|---|---|
| Distinguished Performance Award | Nicole Scherzinger for Sunset Blvd. |
| Outstanding Production of a Musical | Maybe Happy Ending |
| Outstanding Production of a Play | Oh, Mary! |
| Outstanding Revival of a Musical | Sunset Blvd. |
| Outstanding Revival of a Play | Eureka Day and Vanya (tie) |
| Outstanding Direction of a Musical | Michael Arden for Maybe Happy Ending |
| Outstanding Direction of a Play | Sam Pinkleton for Oh, Mary! |
| Distinguished Achievement in Musical Theatre Award | Lea Salonga |
| Unique Contribution to the Theatre | Kate Navin and Audible Theater |
| Founders Award for Excellence in Directing | Whitney White |
| Gratitude Award | Robert Greenblatt and Neil Meron |

Winners 2023–2024

Source: TheaterMania.com

| Category | Winner |
|---|---|
| Distinguished Performance Award | Sarah Paulson for Appropriate |
| Outstanding Production of a Musical | Hell's Kitchen |
| Outstanding Production of a Play | Stereophonic |
| Outstanding Revival of a Musical | Merrily We Roll Along |
| Outstanding Revival of a Play | Appropriate |
| Outstanding Direction of a Musical | Maria Friedman for Merrily We Roll Along |
| Outstanding Direction of a Play | Daniel Aukin for Stereophonic |
| Distinguished Achievement in Musical Theatre Award | Jonathan Groff |
| Unique Contribution to the Theatre | Jessica Lange |
| Founders Award for Excellence in Directing | Schele Williams |
| Gratitude Award | Kandi Burruss |

Winners 2022–2023

Source: Playbill.com

| Category | Winner |
|---|---|
| Distinguished Performance Award | Annaleigh Ashford for Sweeney Todd: The Demon Barber of Fleet Street |
| Outstanding Production of a Musical | Some Like It Hot |
| Outstanding Production of a Play | Leopoldstadt |
| Outstanding Revival of a Musical | Into the Woods |
| Outstanding Revival of a Play | A Doll's House |
| Outstanding Direction of a Musical | Lear deBessonet for Into the Woods |
| Outstanding Direction of a Play | Anne Kauffman for The Sign in Sidney Brustein's Window |
| Distinguished Achievement in Musical Theatre Award | André De Shields |
| Unique Contribution to the Theatre | Drama Book Shop |
| Founders Award for Excellence in Directing | Lear deBessonet |

Winners 2021–2022

Source: Playbill.com

| Category | Winner |
|---|---|
| Distinguished Performance Award | Sutton Foster for The Music Man |
| Outstanding Production of a Musical | A Strange Loop |
| Outstanding Production of a Play | The Lehman Trilogy |
| Outstanding Revival of a Musical | Company |
| Outstanding Revival of a Play | Take Me Out |
| Outstanding Direction of a Musical | Marianne Elliott for Company |
| Outstanding Direction of a Play | Kate Whoriskey for Clyde's |
| Distinguished Achievement in Musical Theatre Award | Hugh Jackman |
| Unique Contribution to the Theatre | Billy Crystal |
| Founders Award for Excellence in Directing | Lileana Blain-Cruz |

Winners 2020-2021

Source: Playbill.com

| Category | Winner |
|---|---|
| Outstanding Digital Theatre, Individual Production | The Great Work Begins: Scenes from Angels in America |
| Outstanding Digital Theatre, Collection or Festival | Theatre in Quarantine |
| Outstanding Interactive or Socially-Distanced Theatre | 7 Deadly Sins |
| Best Audio Theatre Production | The Chonburi International Hotel and Butterfly Club |
| Outstanding Digital Concert Production | Take Me to the World: A Sondheim 90th Birthday Celebration |
| Gratitude Award Honoree | Iris Smith |
| The Founders Award for Excellence in Directing Honoree | Liesl Tommy |
| Distinguished Achievement in Musical Theatre Honoree | Richard Weitz and Demi Weitz |
| Unique Contribution to the Theatre Award Nominee | The Actors Fund |

Winners 2019–2020

Source: Playbill.com

| Category | Winner |
|---|---|
| Distinguished Performance Award | Danny Burstein for Moulin Rouge! |
| Outstanding Production of a Musical | Moulin Rouge! |
| Outstanding Production of a Play | The Inheritance |
| Outstanding Revival of a Musical | Little Shop of Horrors |
| Outstanding Revival of a Play | A Soldier's Play |
| Distinguished Achievement in Musical Theatre Award | James Lapine |
| Unique Contribution to the Theatre | Terrence McNally |
| Founders Award for Excellence in Directing | Marianne Elliott |

Winners 2018–2019

Source: Playbill.com

| Category | Winner |
|---|---|
| Distinguished Performance Award | Bryan Cranston for Network |
| Outstanding Production of a Musical | Hadestown |
| Outstanding Production of a Play | The Ferryman |
| Outstanding Revival of a Musical | Kiss Me, Kate |
| Outstanding Revival of a Play | The Waverly Gallery |
| Distinguished Achievement in Musical Theatre Award | Kelli O'Hara |
| Unique Contribution to the Theatre | Taylor Mac |
| Founders Award for Excellence in Directing | Alex Timbers |

Winners 2017–2018

Source: Playbill.com

| Category | Winner |
|---|---|
| Distinguished Performance Award | Glenda Jackson for Three Tall Women |
| Outstanding Production of a Musical | The Band's Visit |
| Outstanding Production of a Play | Harry Potter and the Cursed Child |
| Outstanding Revival of a Musical | My Fair Lady |
| Outstanding Revival of a Play | Angels in America |
| Distinguished Achievement in Musical Theatre Award | Idina Menzel |
| Unique Contribution to the Theatre | National Endowment for the Arts |
| Founders Award for Excellence in Directing | Casey Nicholaw |

Winners 2016–2017

Source: Playbill.com

- Ben Platt for Dear Evan Hansen – Distinguished Performance Award
- Dear Evan Hansen – Outstanding Production of a Musical
- Oslo – Outstanding Production of a Play
- Hello, Dolly! – Outstanding Revival of a Musical
- Jitney – Outstanding Revival of a Play
- Bette Midler – Distinguished Achievement in Musical Theatre Award
- Bill Berloni – Unique Contribution to the Theatre
- Michael Greif – Founders Award for Excellence in Directing

Winners 2015–2016

Source: Playbill.com

- Lin-Manuel Miranda for Hamilton – Distinguished Performance Award
- Hamilton – Outstanding Production of a Musical
- The Humans – Outstanding Production of a Play
- The Color Purple – Outstanding Revival of a Musical
- A View from the Bridge – Outstanding Revival of a Play
- Sheldon Harnick – Distinguished Achievement in Musical Theatre Award
- Deaf West Theatre – Unique Contribution to the Theatre
- Ivo van Hove – Founders Award for Excellence in Directing

Winners 2014–2015

Source: Playbill.com

- Chita Rivera for The Visit – Distinguished Performance Award
- An American in Paris – Outstanding Production of a Musical
- The Curious Incident of the Dog in the Night-Time – Outstanding Production of a Play
- The King and I – Outstanding Revival of a Musical
- You Can't Take It with You – Outstanding Revival of a Play
- Joel Grey – Distinguished Achievement in Musical Theater Award
- Neal Shapiro and David Horn – Unique Contribution to the Theater Award
- Stephen Daldry – Founders Award for Excellence in Directing

Winners 2013–2014

Source: Playbill.com

- Neil Patrick Harris for Hedwig and the Angry Inch – Distinguished Performance Award
- A Gentleman's Guide to Love and Murder – Outstanding Production of a Musical
- All the Way – Outstanding Production of a Play
- Hedwig and the Angry Inch – Outstanding Revival of a Musical
- The Glass Menagerie – Outstanding Revival of a Play
- Barbara Cook – Distinguished Achievement in Musical Theatre Award
- Key Brand Entertainment/Broadway Across America: John Gore – Unique Contribution to the Theatre Award
- John Tiffany – The Founders Award for Excellence in Directing

Winners 2012–2013

Source: Playbill.com

- Nathan Lane for The Nance – Distinguished Performance Award
- Vanya and Sonia and Masha and Spike – Outstanding Production of a Play
- Kinky Boots – Outstanding Production of a Musical
- Who's Afraid of Virginia Woolf? – Outstanding Revival of a Play
- Pippin – Outstanding Revival of a Musical
- Bernadette Peters – Distinguished Achievement in Musical Theatre Award (presented by Joel Grey)
- Madison Square Garden Entertainment & the Rockettes – Unique Contribution to the Theatre Award (Presented by Tommy Tune)
- Jerry Mitchell – The Founders Award for Excellence in Directing (Presented by Cyndi Lauper)

Winners 2011–2012

Source: Playbill.com

- Audra McDonald for Porgy and Bess – Distinguished Performance Award
- Other Desert Cities – Outstanding Production of a Play
- Death of a Salesman – Outstanding Revival of a Play
- Once – Outstanding Production of a Musical
- Follies – Outstanding Revival of a Musical
- Alan Menken – Distinguished Achievement in Musical Theatre Award
- Rosie O'Donnell – Unique Contribution to the Theatre Award
- Diane Paulus – The Founders Award for Excellence in Directing (formerly the Julia Hansen Award)

Winners 2010–2011

Source: Playbill.com

- Mark Rylance for Jerusalem and La Bête – Distinguished Performance Award
- War Horse – Outstanding Production of a Play
- The Book of Mormon – Outstanding Production of a Musical
- The Normal Heart – Outstanding Revival of a Play
- Anything Goes – Outstanding Revival of a Musical
- Whoopi Goldberg – Unique Contribution to the Theatre Award
- Liza Minnelli – Distinguished Achievement in Musical Theatre Award
- Susan Stroman – Founders Award for Excellence in Directing.

Winners 2009–2010

Source: Playbill.com

- Alfred Molina for Red – Distinguished Performance Award
- Sondheim on Sondheim – Outstanding Production of a Musical
- Red – Outstanding Production of a Play
- La Cage aux Folles – Outstanding Revival of a Musical
- A View from the Bridge – Outstanding Revival of a Play
- Nathan Lane – Distinguished Achievement in Musical Theatre Award
- Kenny Leon – Founders Award for Excellence in Directing
- Macy's Parade and Entertainment Group – Unique Contribution to the Theatre

Winners 2008–2009

Source:Playbill.com

- Geoffrey Rush for Exit the King – Distinguished Performance Award
- God of Carnage, by Yasmina Reza – Outstanding Production of a Play
- Billy Elliot The Musical, Music by Elton John; Book and Lyrics by Lee Hall – Outstanding Production of a Musical
- Blithe Spirit, by Noël Coward – Outstanding Revival of a Play
- Hair, Music by Galt MacDermot; Book, Lyrics by Gerome Ragni, James Rado – Outstanding Revival of a Musical
- Elton John – Distinguished Achievement in Musical Theatre Award
- Arthur Laurents – Founders Award for Excellence in Directing
- Angela Lansbury – Unique Contribution to the Theatre
- Herb Blodgett – The 75th Anniversary Leadership Award

Winners 2007–2008

Source:Variety

- Patti LuPone for Gypsy – Distinguished Performance Award
- August: Osage County by Tracy Letts – Outstanding Production of a Play
- A Catered Affair, Book by Harvey Fierstein; Music and Lyrics by John Bucchino – Outstanding Production of a Musical
- Macbeth by William Shakespeare – Outstanding Revival of a Play
- South Pacific, Book by Joshua Logan and Oscar Hammerstein II, Music by Richard Rodgers; Lyrics by Oscar Hammerstein II – Outstanding Revival of a Musical
- Paul Gemignani – Distinguished Achievement in Musical Theatre Award
- Bartlett Sher – Founders Award for Excellence in Directing
- Ellen Stewart – Unique Contribution to the Theatre

Winners 2006–2007

- Liev Schreiber for Talk Radio and Macbeth – Distinguished Performance Award
- The Coast of Utopia – Outstanding Production of a Play
- Spring Awakening – Outstanding Production of a Musical
- Journey's End – Outstanding Revival of a Play
- Company – Outstanding Revival of a Musical
- John Kander and Fred Ebb – Distinguished Achievement in Musical Theatre
- Michael Mayer – Founders Award for Excellence in Directing
- Broadway Cares/Equity Fights Aids – Unique Contribution to the Theatre

Winners 2005–2006

- Christine Ebersole for Grey Gardens – Distinguished Performance Award
- The History Boys – Outstanding Production of a Play
- Jersey Boys – Outstanding Production of a Musical
- Awake and Sing! – Outstanding Revival of a Play
- Sweeney Todd – Outstanding Revival of a Musical
- Patti LuPone – Distinguished Achievement in Musical Theatre
- Marian Seldes – Unique Contribution to the Theatre
- Des McAnuff- Founders Award for Excellence in Directing

Winners 2004–2005

- Norbert Leo Butz for Dirty Rotten Scoundrels – Distinguished Performance Award
- Doubt – Outstanding Production of a Play
- Dirty Rotten Scoundrels – Outstanding Production of a Musical
- Twelve Angry Men – Outstanding Revival of a Play
- La Cage aux Folles – Outstanding Revival of a Musical
- BMI Musical Theatre Workshop – Distinguished Achievement in Musical Theatre
- The Billy Rose Theatre Collection at the New York Public Library at Lincoln Center – Unique Contribution to the Theatre
- Mike Nichols – Founders Award for Excellence in Directing

Winners 2003–2004

- Hugh Jackman for The Boy from Oz– Distinguished Performance Award
- I Am My Own Wife – Outstanding Production of a Play
- Wicked – Outstanding Production of a Musical
- Henry IV – Outstanding Revival of a Play
- Assassins – Outstanding Revival of a Musical
- Donna Murphy – Distinguished Achievement in Musical Theatre
- City Center Encores – Unique Contribution to the Theatre
- George C. Wolfe – Founders Award for Excellence in Directing

Winners 2002–2003

- Harvey Fierstein for Hairspray – Distinguished Performance Award
- Take Me Out – Outstanding Production of a Play
- Hairspray – Outstanding Production of a Musical
- A Day in the Death of Joe Egg – Outstanding Revival
- Twyla Tharp – Distinguished Achievement in Musical Theatre
- Roundabout Theatre Company: Todd Haimes – Unique Contribution to the Theatre
- Joe Mantello – Founders Award for Excellence in Directing

Winners 2001–2002

- Metamorphoses – Outstanding Production of a Play
- Urinetown – Outstanding Production of a Musical
- The Crucible – Outstanding Revival
- Liam Neeson for The Crucible – Distinguished Performance Award
- Elaine Stritch – Distinguished Achievement in Musical Theatre
- Julia Hansen – Unique Contribution to the Theatre
- Sir Richard Eyre – Founders Award for Excellence in Directing

Winners 2000–2001

- Proof – Outstanding Production of a Play
- The Producers – Outstanding Production of a Musical
- One Flew Over the Cuckoo's Nest – Outstanding Revival
- Mary-Louise Parker for Proof and Gary Sinise for One Flew Over the Cuckoo's Nest – Distinguished Performance Award
- Susan Stroman – Distinguished Achievement in Musical Theatre
- Steppenwolf Theatre Company: Terry Kinney, Jeff Perry, Gary Sinise – Unique Contribution to the Theatre
- Jack O'Brien – Founders Award for Excellence in Directing

Winners 1999–2000

- Copenhagen – Outstanding Production of a Play
- Contact – Outstanding Production of a Musical
- Kiss Me, Kate – Outstanding Revival
- Eileen Heckart for The Waverly Gallery – Distinguished Performance Award
- Audra McDonald – Distinguished Achievement in Musical Theatre
- Actors Theatre of Louisville: Jon Jory – Unique Contribution to the Theatre
- Daniel Sullivan – Founders Award for Excellence in Directing

Winners 1998–1999

- Wit – Outstanding Production of a Play
- Fosse – Outstanding Production of a Musical
- Death of a Salesman – Outstanding Revival
- Kathleen Chalfant for Wit – Distinguished Performance Award
- Ann Reinking and Gwen Verdon – Distinguished Achievement in Musical Theatre
- Sir David Hare – Unique Contribution to the Theatre

Winners 1997–1998

- The Beauty Queen of Leenane – Outstanding Production of a Play
- Ragtime – Outstanding Production of a Musical
- Cabaret – Outstanding Revival
- Brian Stokes Mitchell for Ragtime – Distinguished Performance Award
- Julie Taymor – Distinguished Achievement in Musical Theatre
- The Brooklyn Academy of Music: Harvey Lichtenstein – Unique Contribution to the Theatre

Winners 1996–1997

- The Last Night of Ballyhoo – Outstanding Production of a Play
- The Life – Outstanding Production of a Musical
- Chicago – Outstanding Revival
- Charles Durning for The Gin Game and Bebe Neuwirth for Chicago – Distinguished Performance Award
- Gerard Alessandrini – Distinguished Achievement in Musical Theatre
- Jason Robards – Unique Contribution to the Theatre

Winners 1995–1996

- Seven Guitars – Outstanding Production of a Play
- Rent – Outstanding Production of a Musical
- A Delicate Balance – Outstanding Revival
- Uta Hagen for Mrs. Klein – Distinguished Performance Award
- George C. Wolfe – Distinguished Achievement in Musical Theatre
- The 42nd Street Development Project, The New 42nd Street, The Walt Disney Company, Livent – Unique Contribution to the Theatre

Winners history

List of winners, 1935 through 2014.

== See also ==
- Tony Award
- Drama Desk Awards
- Obie Award
- New York Drama Critics Award
- Outer Critics Circle Awards
