= Dodger Stadium =

Baseball park in Los Angeles, California

- Chavez Ravine; Blue Heaven on Earth

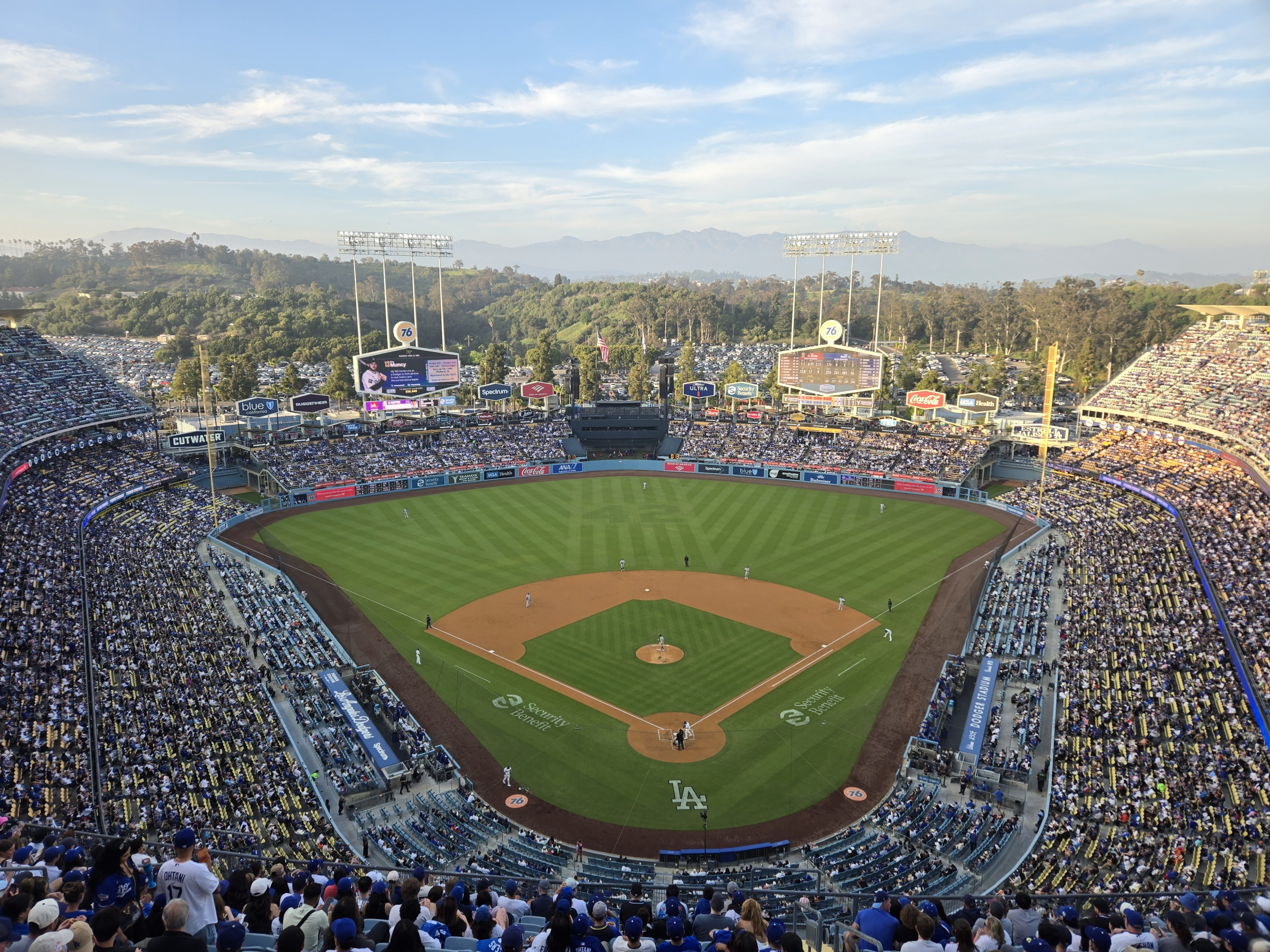
- Dodger Stadium in 2025

- Location in the Greater Los Angeles area Location in California Location in the United States Location in North America
- Interactive map of Dodger Stadium
- Full name: Uniqlo Field at Dodger Stadium
- Address: 1000 Vin Scully Avenue
- Location: Los Angeles, California, U.S.
- Coordinates: 34°4′25″N 118°14′24″W
- Owner: Guggenheim Baseball Management
- Operator: Los Angeles Dodgers
- Capacity: 56,000
- Type: Stadium
- Surface: Santa Ana Bermuda grass
- Record attendance: 57,098 (Dodgers’ home opener, April 13, 2009)
- Field size: Left field – 330 ft (101 m); Medium left-center – 360 ft (110 m); True left-center – 375 ft (114 m); Center field – 395 ft (120 m); True center field – 400 ft (122 m); True right-center – 375 ft (114 m); Medium right-center – 360 ft (110 m); Right field – 330 ft (101 m); Backstop – 55 ft (17 m)
- Public transit: Dodger Stadium Express

Construction
- Groundbreaking: September 17, 1959; 67 years ago
- Opened: April 10, 1962; 64 years ago
- Cost: US$23 million
- Architect: Praeger-Kavanagh-Waterbury
- Structural engineers: William Simpson & Associates Inc.
- Services engineer: SA Bogen Engineers
- General contractor: Vinnell Corporation

Tenants
- Los Angeles Dodgers (MLB) (1962–present); Los Angeles Angels (MLB) (1962–1965)

Website
- mlb.com/dodgers/ballpark

Dodger Stadium is a ballpark in the Elysian Park neighborhood of Los Angeles, California, United States. It is the home of the Los Angeles Dodgers of Major League Baseball (MLB). Opened in 1962, it was constructed in less than three years at a cost of US$23 million. It is the oldest ballpark in MLB west of the Mississippi River, and third-oldest overall, after Fenway Park in Boston (1912) and Wrigley Field in Chicago (1914), and is the largest baseball stadium in the world by seat capacity. Often referred to as a "pitcher's ballpark", the stadium has been the site of 13 no-hitters, two of them perfect games.

The stadium hosted the Major League Baseball All-Star Game in 1980 and 2022, as well as the World Series twelve times (1963, 1965, 1966, 1974, 1977, 1978, 1981, 1988, 2017, 2018, 2024, and 2025). It also hosted the semifinals and finals of the 2009 and 2017 World Baseball Classics, as well as exhibition baseball during the 1984 Summer Olympics. The stadium hosted a soccer tournament on August 3, 2013, featuring four clubs: the hometown team Los Angeles Galaxy, and Europe's Real Madrid, Everton, and Juventus. The Los Angeles Kings and Anaheim Ducks played a regular season game in 2014 as part of the NHL Stadium Series. The stadium was also the home of the Los Angeles Angels from 1962 through 1965.

The stadium is commonly referred to as Chavez Ravine Stadium (or just "Chavez Ravine"), after the geographic feature in which the stadium sits. It is sometimes referred to as "Blue Heaven on Earth", a nickname coined by former Dodgers manager Tommy Lasorda. A naming rights deal with Uniqlo resulted in the adoption of the alternative name Uniqlo Field at Dodger Stadium effective March 25, 2026.

== History ==
=== Construction ===
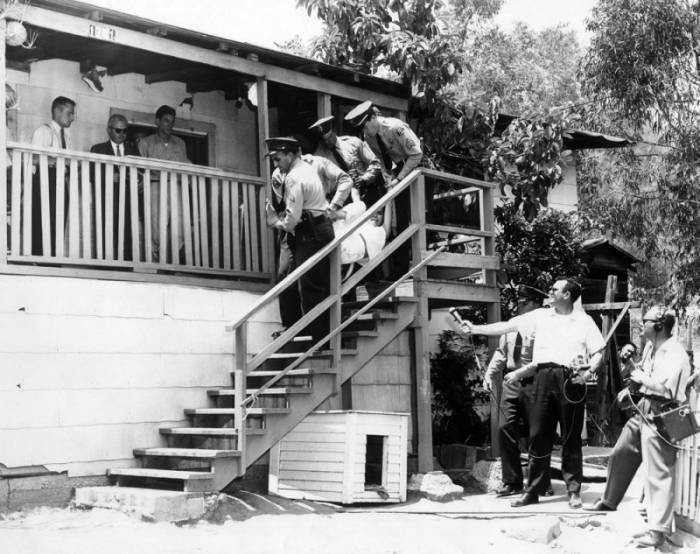
Los Angeles County Sheriffs forcibly evicting Aurora Vargas from her home on Malvina Avenue in Chávez Ravine, as part of the "Battle of Chavez Ravine"

In the mid-1950s, Brooklyn Dodgers team president Walter O'Malley had tried to build a domed stadium in the New York City borough of Brooklyn, but was unable to reach an agreement with city officials for the land acquisition, and eventually reached a deal with the city of Los Angeles. The land that would be used for Dodger Stadium had previously been seized from local owners and inhabitants by the city of Los Angeles, using eminent domain with funds from the federal Housing Act of 1949. The city had planned to develop the Elysian Park Heights public housing project, which included two dozen 13-story buildings and more than 160 two-story townhouses, in addition to newly rebuilt playgrounds and schools, and a college.

Before construction could begin on the housing project, the local political climate changed greatly when Norris Poulson was elected mayor of Los Angeles in 1953. Proposed public housing projects such as Elysian Park Heights lost most of their support as they became associated with socialist ideals. Following protracted negotiations, the city purchased the Chavez Ravine property back from the Federal Housing Authority at a drastically reduced price, with the stipulation that the land be used for a public purpose. It was not until June 3, 1958, when Los Angeles voters approved a "Taxpayers Committee for Yes on Baseball" referendum, that the Dodgers were able to acquire 352 acres (1.42 km^{2}) of Chavez Ravine from the city. Los Angeles forcefully evicted residents from their homes, mainly Hispanics. While Dodger Stadium was under construction, the Dodgers played in the league's largest capacity venue from 1958 through 1961 at their temporary home, the Los Angeles Memorial Coliseum, which could seat in excess of 90,000 people.

Los Angeles–based Mike Davis, in his seminal work on the city, City of Quartz, describes the process of gradually convincing Chavez Ravine homeowners to sell. With nearly all of the original Spanish-speaking homeowners initially unwilling to sell, developers resorted to offering immediate cash payments, distributed through their Spanish-speaking agents. Once the first sales had been completed, remaining homeowners were offered increasingly lesser amounts of money, to create a community panic of not receiving fair compensation, or of being left as one of the few holdouts. Many residents continued to hold out despite the pressure being placed upon them by developers, resulting in the Battle of Chavez Ravine, a ten-year struggle by the residents to maintain control of their property, which they ultimately lost.

Dodger Stadium was the first Major League Baseball stadium since the initial construction of the original Yankee Stadium to be built using 100% private financing, and the last until Oracle Park in San Francisco opened in 2000. Ground was broken for Dodger Stadium on September 17, 1959. The tops of local ridges were removed, and the soil was used to fill in Sulfur and Cemetery Ravines to provide a level surface for a parking lot and the stadium. The former Palo Verde Elementary School building was simply buried rather than being demolished, and sits beneath the parking lot northwest of third base. A total of 8 million cubic yards (6,100,000 m^{3}) of earth were moved in the process of building the stadium. A total of 21,000 precast concrete units, some weighing as much as 32 tons, were fabricated onsite and lowered into place with a specially built crane to form the stadium's structural framework. The stadium was originally designed to be expandable to 85,000 seats by expanding the upper decks over the outfield pavilions, but the Dodgers have never pursued such a project.

=== Frank McCourt era ===
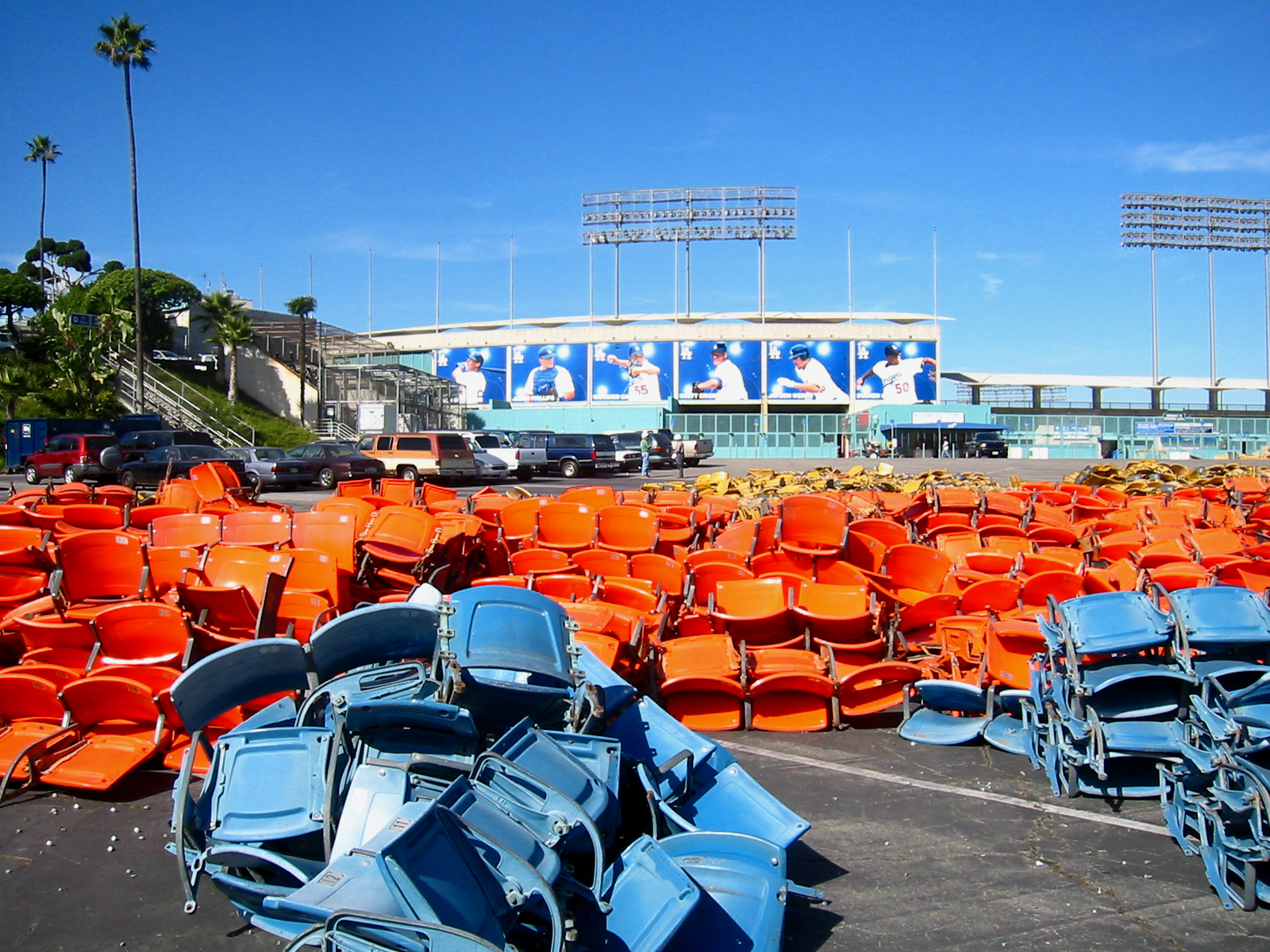
Dodger Stadium seat removal, 2005 offseason

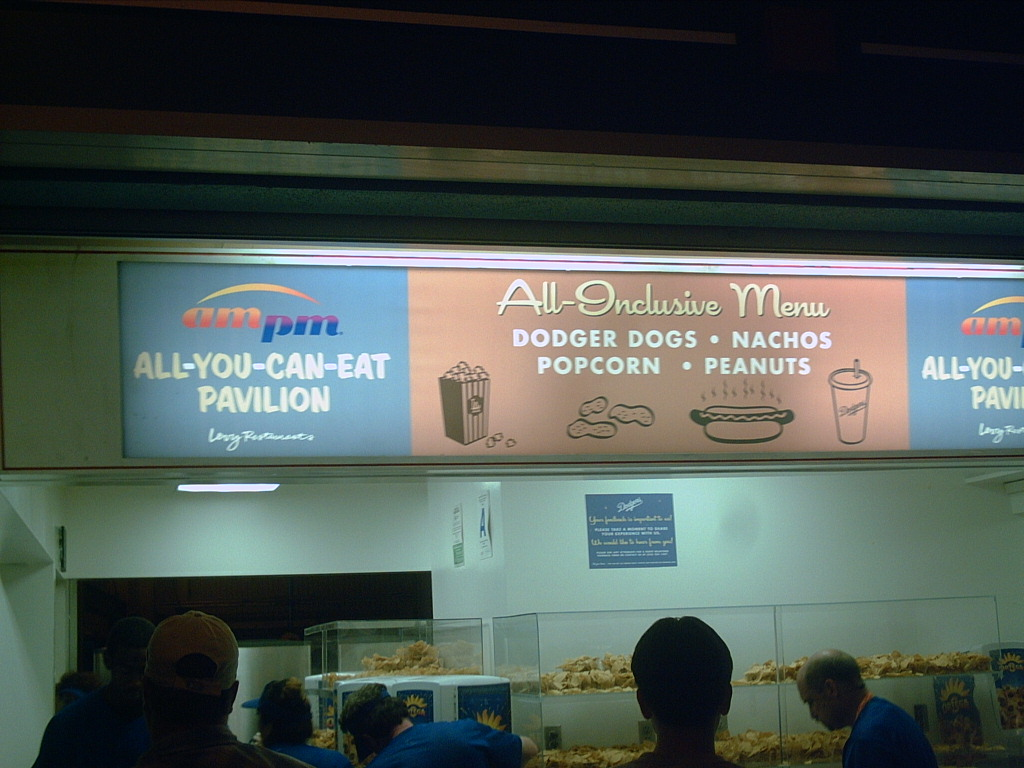
The former all-you-can-eat seats in the right-field pavilion

At the conclusion of the 2005 season, the Los Angeles Dodgers made major renovations during the subsequent off-season.

The largest of these improvements was the replacement of nearly all the seats in the stadium. The seats that were removed had been in use since 1975 and helped give the stadium its unique "space age" feel with a color palette of bright yellow, orange, blue, and red. The new seats are in the original (more muted) 1962 color scheme consisting of yellow, light orange, turquoise, and sky blue. 2,000 pairs of seats were made available for purchase at $250, with the proceeds going to charity.

The baseline seating sections have been converted into retro-style "box" seating, adding leg room and a table. Other repairs were made to the concrete structure of the stadium. These improvements mark the second phase of a multi-year improvement plan for Dodger Stadium.

=== Renovations ===
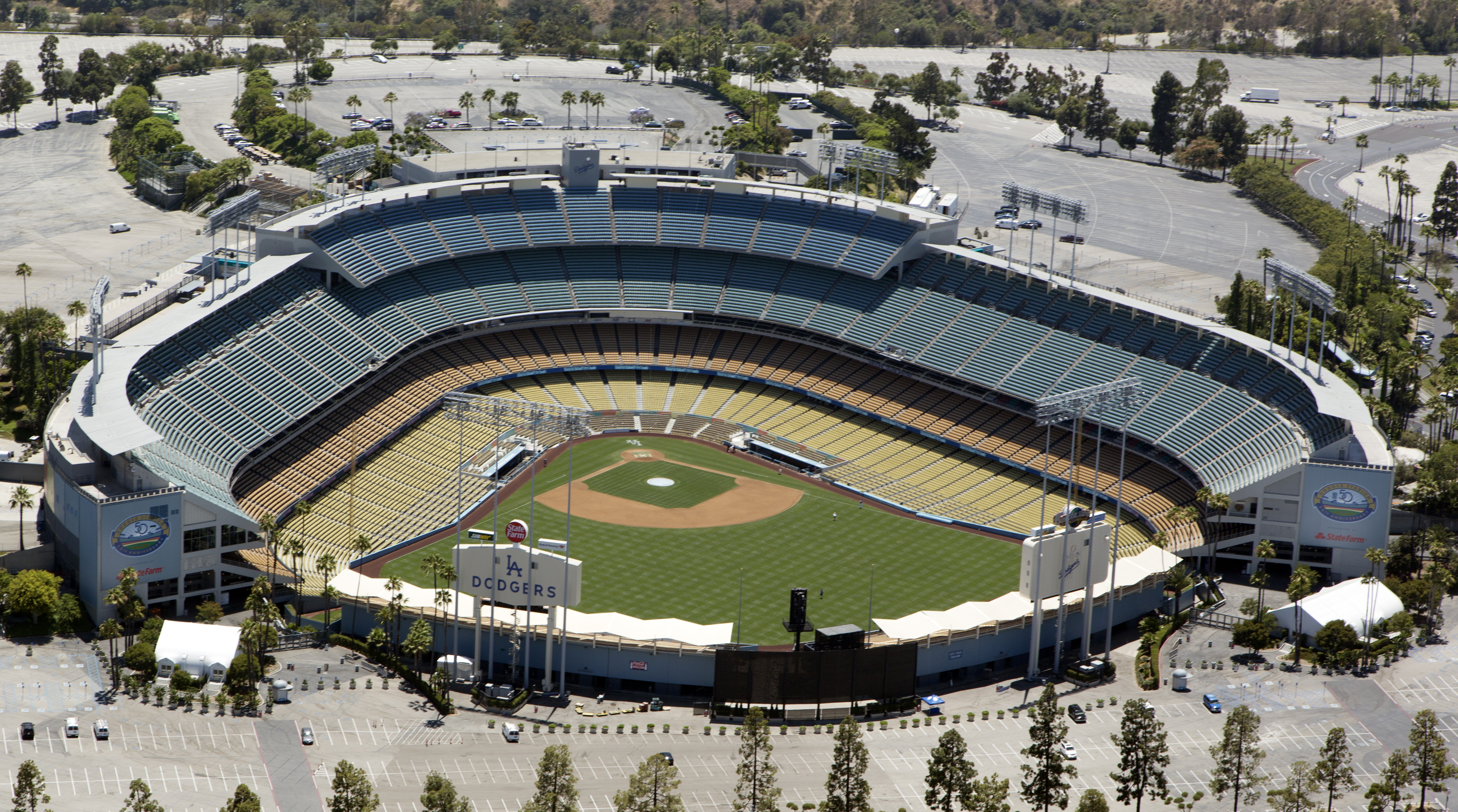
Aerial view of Dodger Stadium in 2012

Between 2003 and 2005, Dodger Stadium upgraded with LED video displays. The large main video display measures 27 feet (8.2 m) high by 47 feet (14 m) wide.

In 2008, the Dodgers announced a $412 million project to build a Dodger museum, shops, and restaurants around Dodger Stadium. In a press release, the team described the various features of the renovation as follows:

- Dodger Way – A tree-lined entrance will lead to a landscaped grand plaza where fans can gather beyond center field. The plaza will connect to a promenade that features restaurants, shops and the Dodger Experience museum showcasing the history of the Dodgers in an interactive setting.
- Green Necklace – The vibrant street setting of Dodger Way links to a beautiful perimeter around Dodger Stadium, enabling fans to walk around the park, outdoors yet inside the stadium gates. This Green Necklace will transform acres of parking lots into a landscaped outdoor walkway connecting the plaza and promenade to the rest of the ballpark.
- Top of the Park – The Green Necklace connects to a large scale outdoor plaza featuring breathtaking 360° views spanning the downtown skyline and Santa Monica Bay, the Santa Monica and San Gabriel Mountains, and the Dodger Stadium diamond.

In the 2008–2009 off-season, the upper levels of the stadium were supposed to be renovated to match the repairs and improvements made to the field level. The improvements were to include the removal of the trough urinals in the men's restrooms, new concession stands and earthquake retrofitting to the concrete structure. It was also to include the replacement of the outfield scoreboards and monitors with new HD monitors. Due to the 2009 World Baseball Classic hosted at Dodger Stadium, these renovations were put on hold. The divorce of Frank and Jamie McCourt, as well as a weak economy, were the reasons for the postponement.

To pay for an outstanding loan with the Dodgers former owner News Corporation, former owner Frank McCourt used Dodger Stadium as collateral to obtain a $250 million loan.

In 2008, the Los Angeles City Council voted unanimously to give the Dodger Stadium area bounded by Academy Rd, Lookout Dr. and Stadium Way its own zip code, 90090 (as of July 2009). This also gives the area a new name, Dodgertown. The signs from the former Dodgertown spring training facility in Vero Beach, Florida will likely be integrated into the $500 million project.

=== New ownership and further renovation ===
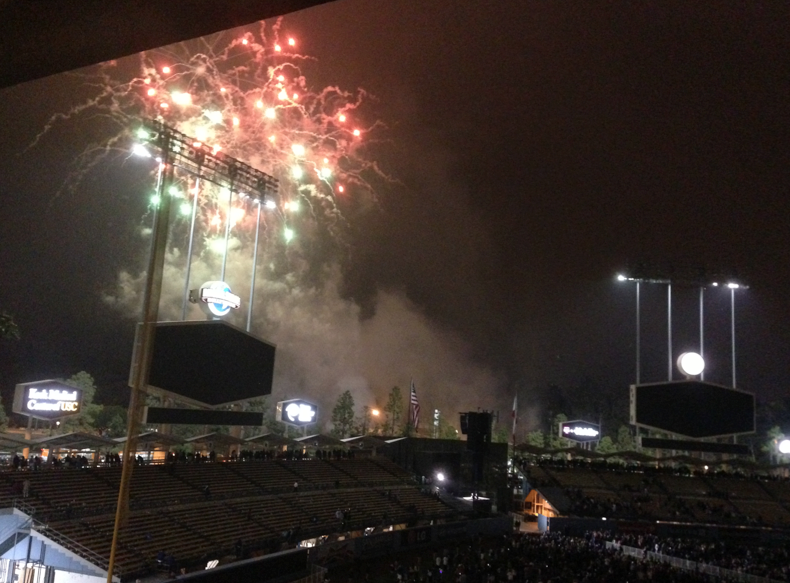
Dodger Stadium during a post-game "fireworks night" promotion, showing the new HD screens in place of the old rectangular video board and scoreboard

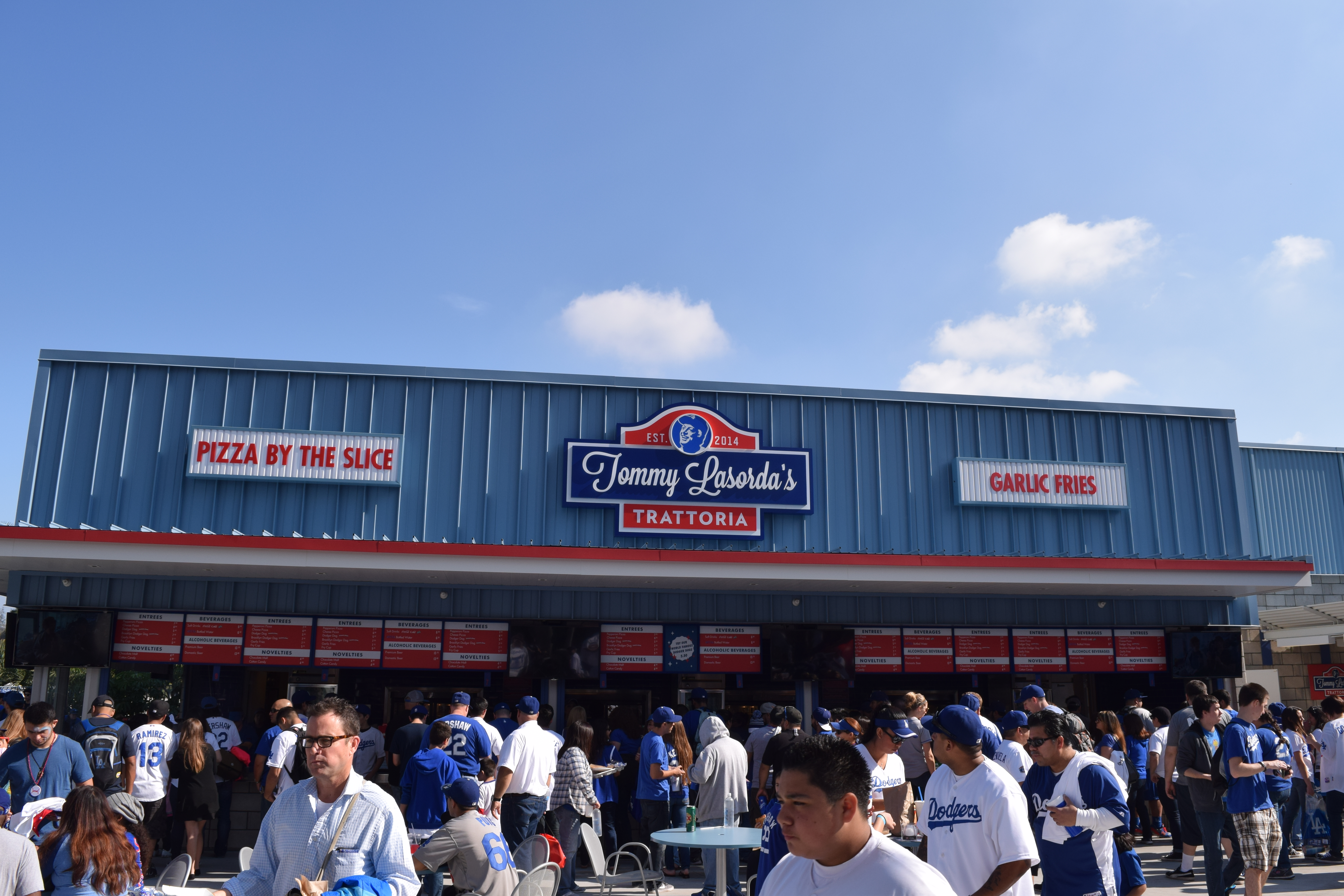
Tommy Lasorda's Trattoria, an Italian restaurant in the right field concourse at Dodger Stadium, a product of the minor 2014 renovations

Following the sale of the Dodgers in 2012, the team brought in the architect, urban planner, and stadium specialist Janet Marie Smith to lead renovations efforts to the 50-year-old stadium. Renovations to Dodger Stadium began in the winter of 2012. Both video boards were replaced with High Definition screens, and new clubhouses and weight rooms were installed. The restrooms, concession stands, sound system and batting cages were also improved and renovated.

Dodgers owner Guggenheim Partners internally discussed moving the Dodgers to a new stadium at a Downtown Los Angeles site proposed by the Anschutz Entertainment Group to allow an NFL team to build a stadium at the Dodger Stadium site. Guggenheim Partners also considered allowing an NFL team to build a stadium next to Dodger Stadium. The NFL eventually chose to build SoFi Stadium in the City of Inglewood.

The extensive renovations to Dodger Stadium were ready for the 2013 season and included new HD hexagonal video and scoreboards, a new sound system, wider concourses, more standing room viewing areas, improved restrooms and a children's playground amongst others.

Between the 2013 and 2014 seasons, more renovations were put in place. Dodger Stadium was the beneficiary of improvements such as wider concourses in the pavilions, new restaurants "Think Blue Bar-B-Que" and "Tommy Lasorda's Trattoria", dedicated team store buildings replacing the tents that previously served as team stores, bullpen overlooks with overlook bars, and tree relocation at the top of the stadium.

On July 23, 2019, a press conference was held with the presentation of the $100 million renovation to the ballpark, which includes a 2-acre (0.81 ha) center field plaza with a children's playground located between the left field and right field bleachers, the relocation of the Jackie Robinson statue from the left field entrance to the center field playground, as well as a display honoring the Legends of Dodger Baseball, along with a sports bar and a beer garden.

Also included as part of the renovation were new elevators and escalators which connect the outfield bleachers with the field, loge and reserve levels, a new stadium center main entrance, and the commission of a statue of Sandy Koufax which was to be unveiled next to the statue of Robinson. While the renovations were completed during the delayed 2020 season, due to the COVID-19 pandemic, the unveiling of Koufax's statue was delayed two years.

== Features ==
=== Design ===
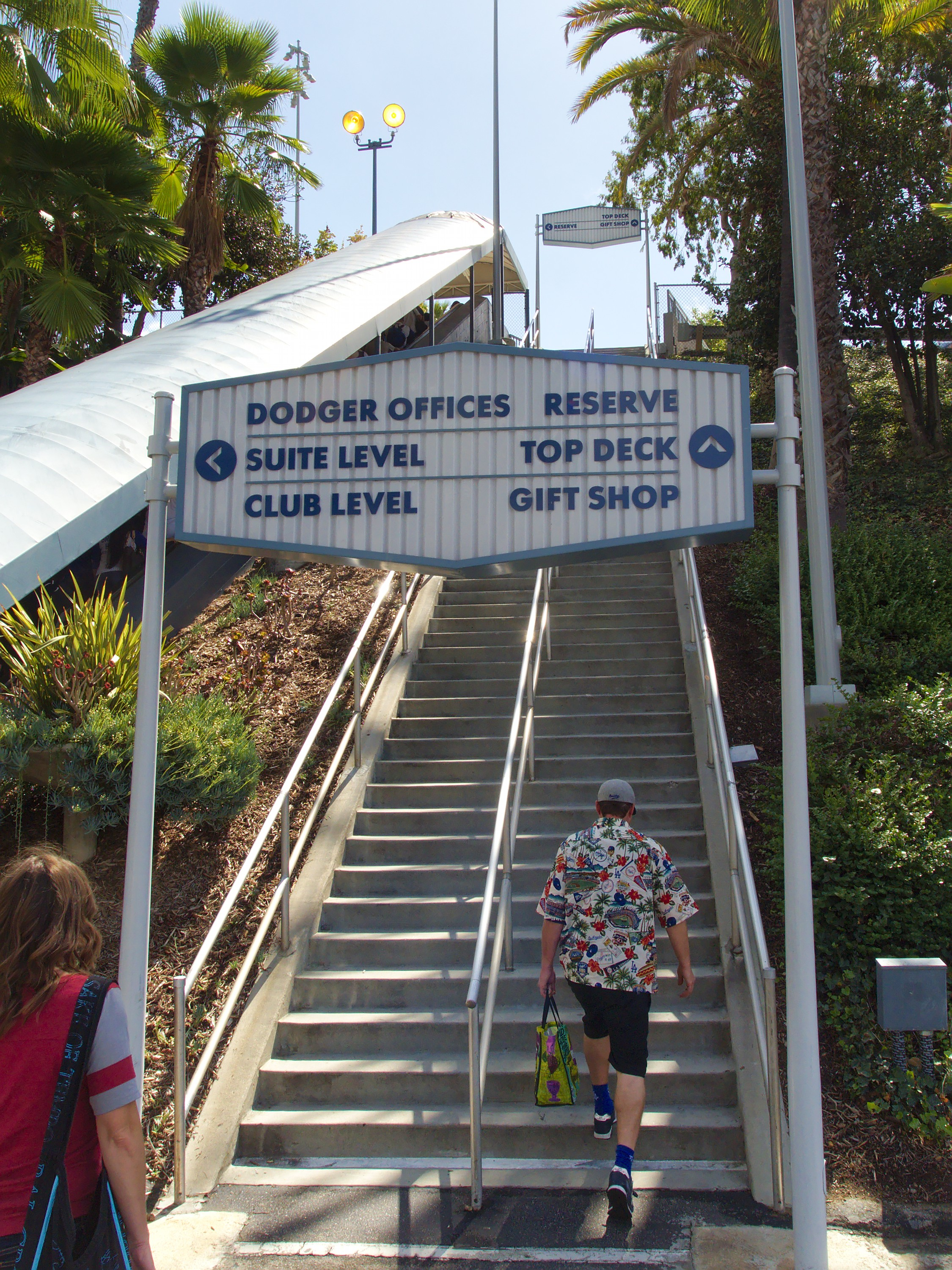
Stairs to upper deck and reserve seats

Dodger Stadium was one of the last baseball-only facilities built before the dawn of the multi-purpose stadium. It was built near the convergence of several freeways near downtown Los Angeles, with an expansive parking lot surrounding the stadium. With the construction of many new MLB ballparks in recent years, it is now the third-oldest park still in use, and the oldest on the West Coast.

Dodger Stadium offered several innovative design features. One of these was a covered and screened section of dugout-level seats behind home plate. Dodger owner Walter O'Malley was inspired to incorporate this feature into the Dodger Stadium design after having seen it at Tokyo's Korakuen Stadium during the Brooklyn Dodgers' postseason goodwill tour of Japan in 1956. The original dugout seating area was replaced by more conventional box seating in a 1999 renovation, but this feature has been replicated at Progressive Field in Cleveland and Angel Stadium.

Two of Dodger Stadium's most distinctive features are the wavy roof atop each outfield pavilion and the top of a 10-story elevator shaft bearing the Dodger logo rising directly behind home plate at the top of the uppermost seating level.

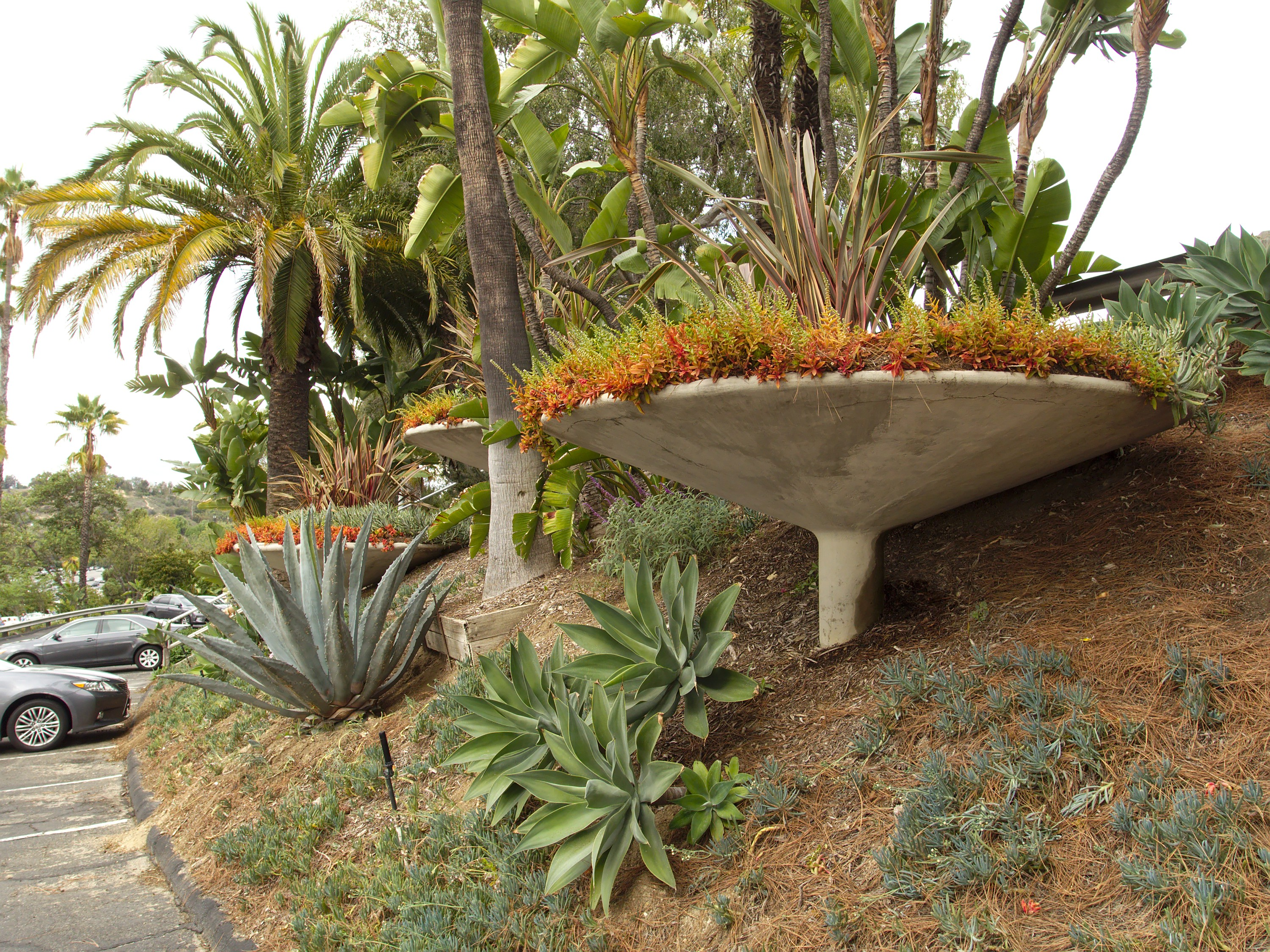
Landscaping in parking lot

A unique terraced-earthworks parking lot was built behind the main stands, allowing ticket-holders to park at roughly the level of their seats, minimizing use of ramps once inside. The stadium was also designed to be earthquake-resistant, an important consideration in California, and it has withstood several serious earthquakes.

Dodger Stadium was originally equipped with two large Fair Play electronic scoreboard units above the left- and right-field pavilions. The right-field board displayed in-game information. The left-field board displayed scores of out-of-town games and other messages. Smaller auxiliary scoreboards were installed at field level on the box seat fences beyond the first- and third-base dugouts during the inaugural 1962 season. The left-field message board was replaced by a Mitsubishi Electric Diamond Vision video board in 1980. The field-level auxiliary scoreboards were replaced by larger units installed on the facade of the Loge (second) seating level in 1998; these, in turn, were replaced by a video ribbon board in 2006. Field-level out-of-town scoreboards were installed on the left- and right-field walls in 2003.

Strobe lights were added in 2001; they flash when the Dodgers take the field, after a Dodger home run, and after a Dodger win. In 2018, blue strobe lights were added.

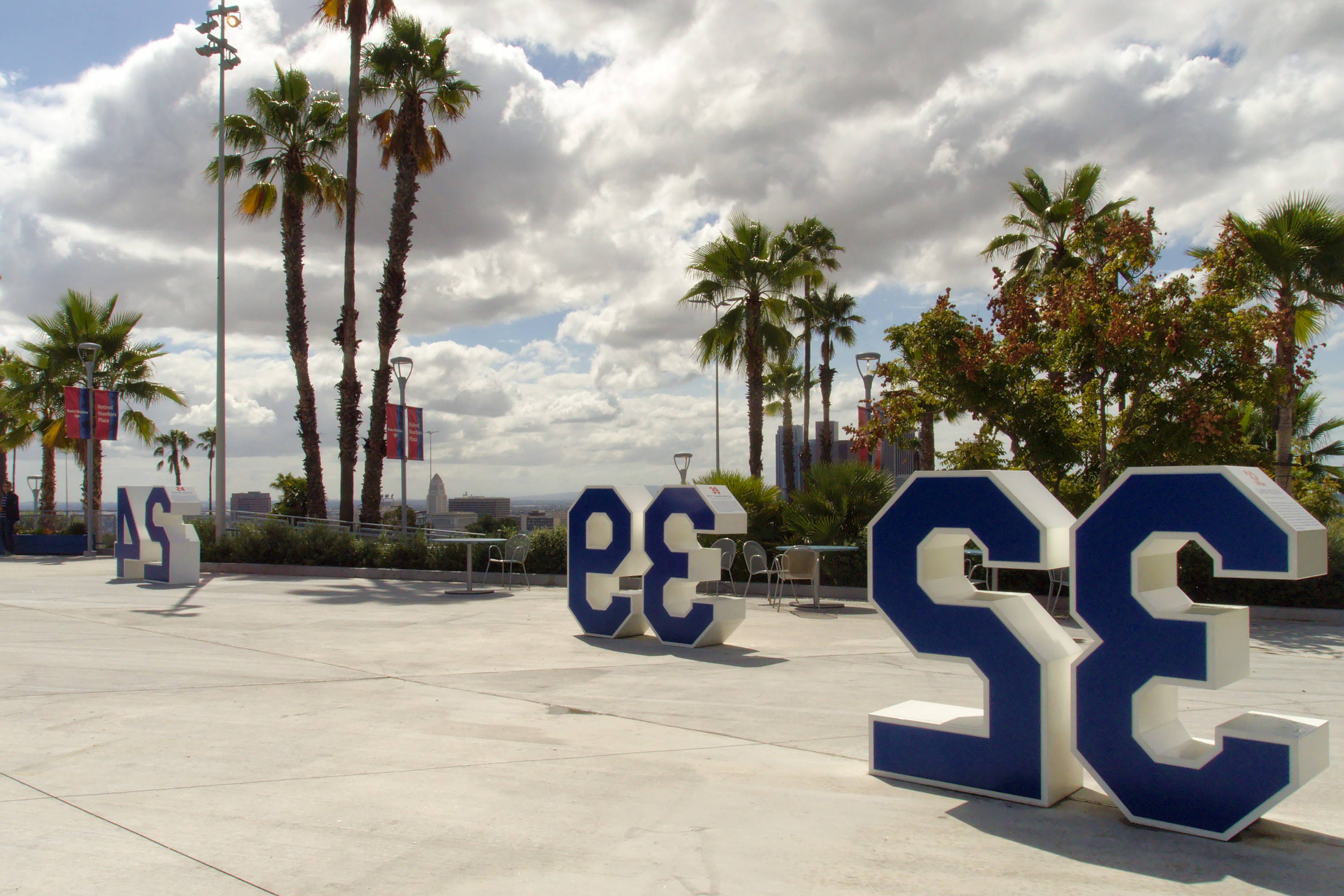
Hall of retired numbers inside the stadium in 2015

=== Retired numbers ===
In addition to those of Don Drysdale (53), Sandy Koufax (32), and Don Sutton (20), the retired numbers of Pee Wee Reese (1), Jackie Robinson (42), Duke Snider (4), Tommy Lasorda (2), Walter Alston (24), Roy Campanella (39), Jim Gilliam (19), Gil Hodges (14), and Fernando Valenzuela (34) are mounted on the club level facade near the left field foul pole. Also honored on the left field line in addition to the retired numbers are broadcasters Vin Scully and Jaime Jarrin, and longtime owner Walter O'Malley.

=== Statues and displays ===
On April 15, 2017, to mark the 70th anniversary of Robinson's major league debut, the Dodgers unveiled a bronze statue of the historic player in the stadium's left-field plaza. The 800-pound (360 kg) sculpture, made by sculptor Branly Cadet, depicts Robinson sliding into home plate as a rookie.

On June 18, 2022, the Dodgers unveiled a bronze statue of Sandy Koufax in the Centerfield Plaza, next to the statue of Robinson, which had been moved there in 2020 as part of renovations. The sculpture, which was also made by Cadet, depicts Koufax's signature leg kick as he goes into his windup.

As part of the Dodgers' annual LGBTQ+ Pride Night on June 5, 2026, a permanent exhibit commemorating gay players Billy Bean and Glenn Burke was added to the Centerfield Plaza. The stadium previously relaunched "Christian Faith and Family Day" on July 30, 2023, in response to previous Pride events at the stadium.

=== Location ===
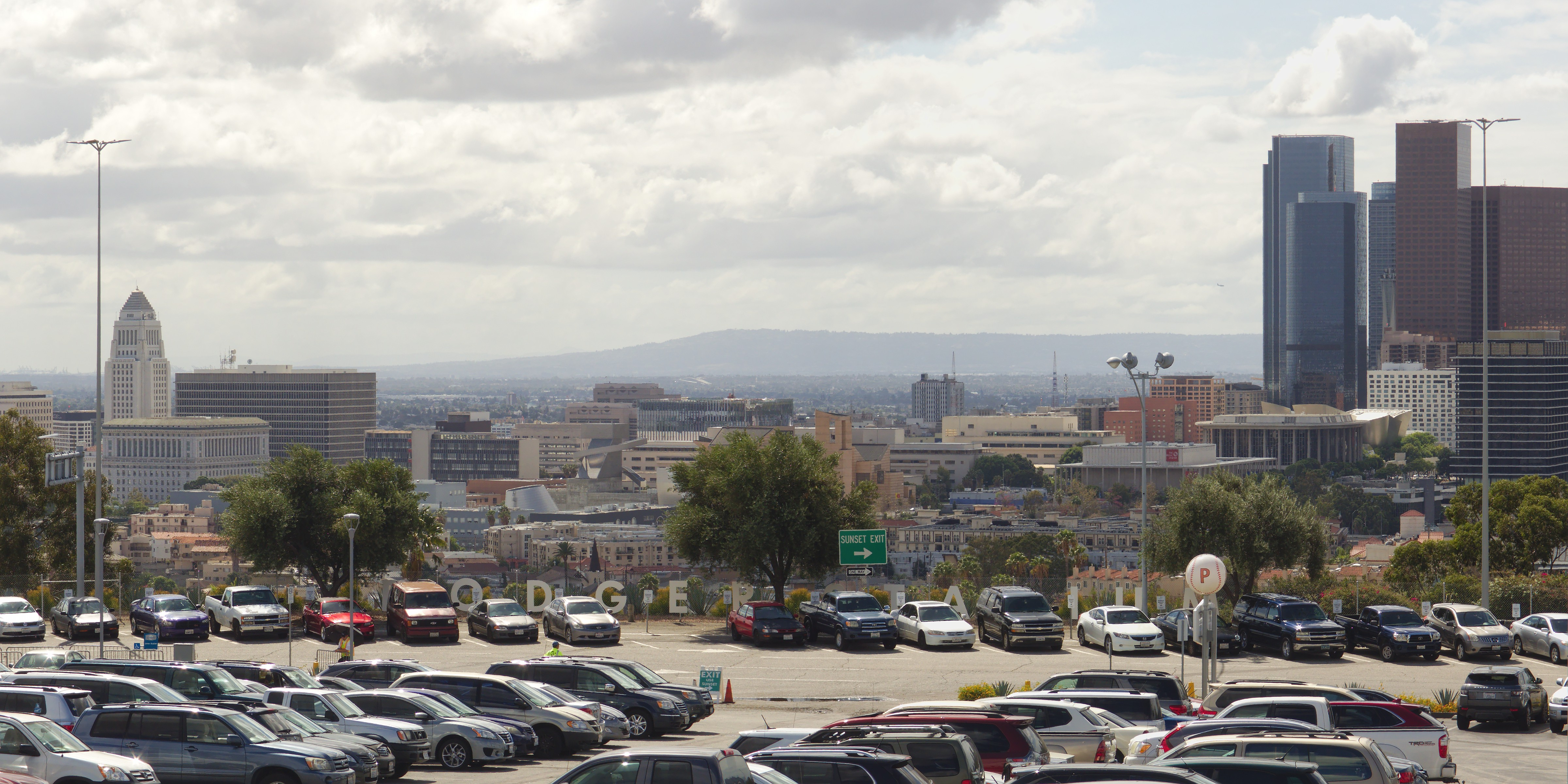
View of downtown and the Palos Verdes Peninsula

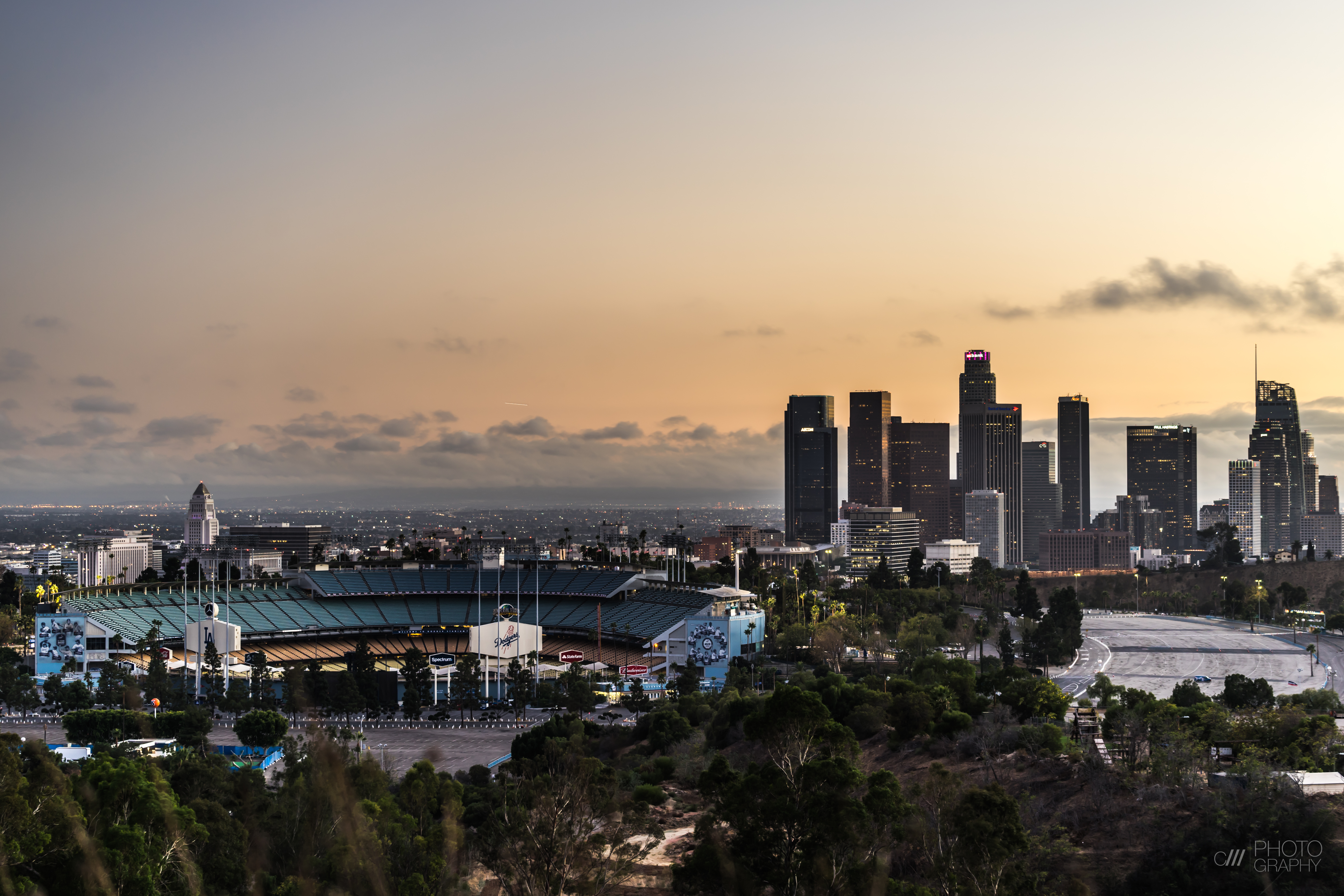
Dodger Stadium and Downtown Los Angeles

The former Think Blue sign in the mountains north of Dodger Stadium was an homage to the nearby Hollywood Sign.

Built on top of the historic Los Angeles neighborhood of Chavez Ravine in Solano Canyon, the stadium overlooks downtown Los Angeles and provides views of the city to the south, the green tree-lined hills of Elysian Park to the north and east, and the San Gabriel Mountains beyond the outfield pavilions. Due to dry summers in Southern California, rainouts at Dodger Stadium are rare. Prior to 1976, the Dodgers were rained out only once, against the St. Louis Cardinals, on April 21, 1967, ending a streak of 737 consecutive games without a postponement. On April 12, 1976, the second home rainout ended a streak of 724 straight games. April 19–21, 1988 saw three consecutive rainouts, the only time consecutive games have been rained out at Dodger Stadium. No rainouts occurred between April 21, 1988, and April 11, 1999 – a major league record of 856 straight home games without a rainout. That record has since been broken, with no rainouts since April 17, 2000, 1,471 consecutive games through October 3, 2019.

=== Seating ===
Dodger Stadium has never increased its seating capacity, and was the only current MLB park (through 2005) that had never done so, due to a conditional-use permit that limits Dodger Stadium's seating capacity to 56,000. Whenever higher-revenue lower seats were added, some in the upper deck or pavilion were removed to keep the number the same. Through the sale of standing room only tickets, the Dodgers' 2009 home opener drew 57,099 fans, the largest crowd in stadium history. Following a number of incidents in the early 1970s in which fans showered Cincinnati Reds left fielder Pete Rose with beer, bottles, cups, and trash, the sale of beer was discontinued in both pavilions. Beer sales were reinstated in the right field pavilion in 2008, when that section was converted into the All You Can Eat Pavilion. Fans seated in that section can eat unlimited hot dogs and peanuts and also have access to free soft drinks. There is a charge for beer.

With the retirement of the original Yankee Stadium and Shea Stadium in 2008, the park reigned as the largest capacity ballpark in the Majors.

As of 2010, there are a total of 2,098 club seats and 68 luxury suites. Both of these amounts will increase once the renovations are complete, with the necessary offset to comply with its conditional-use permit.

Due to renovations made in the 2012–2013 offseason, the current maximum capacity of Dodger Stadium is less than 56,000, although the team's president, Stan Kasten, refuses to provide an exact number. A 53,393 attendance is considered a sellout. The high water mark since the renovations is 56,800 in Games 3, 4, and 5 of the 2008 NLCS. The team's 2013 media guide and website still report the capacity as 56,000.

Dodger Stadium achieved record paid attendance during the 2024 season with 3,941,251 spectators.

=== Field dimensions and "pitchers' park" reputation ===
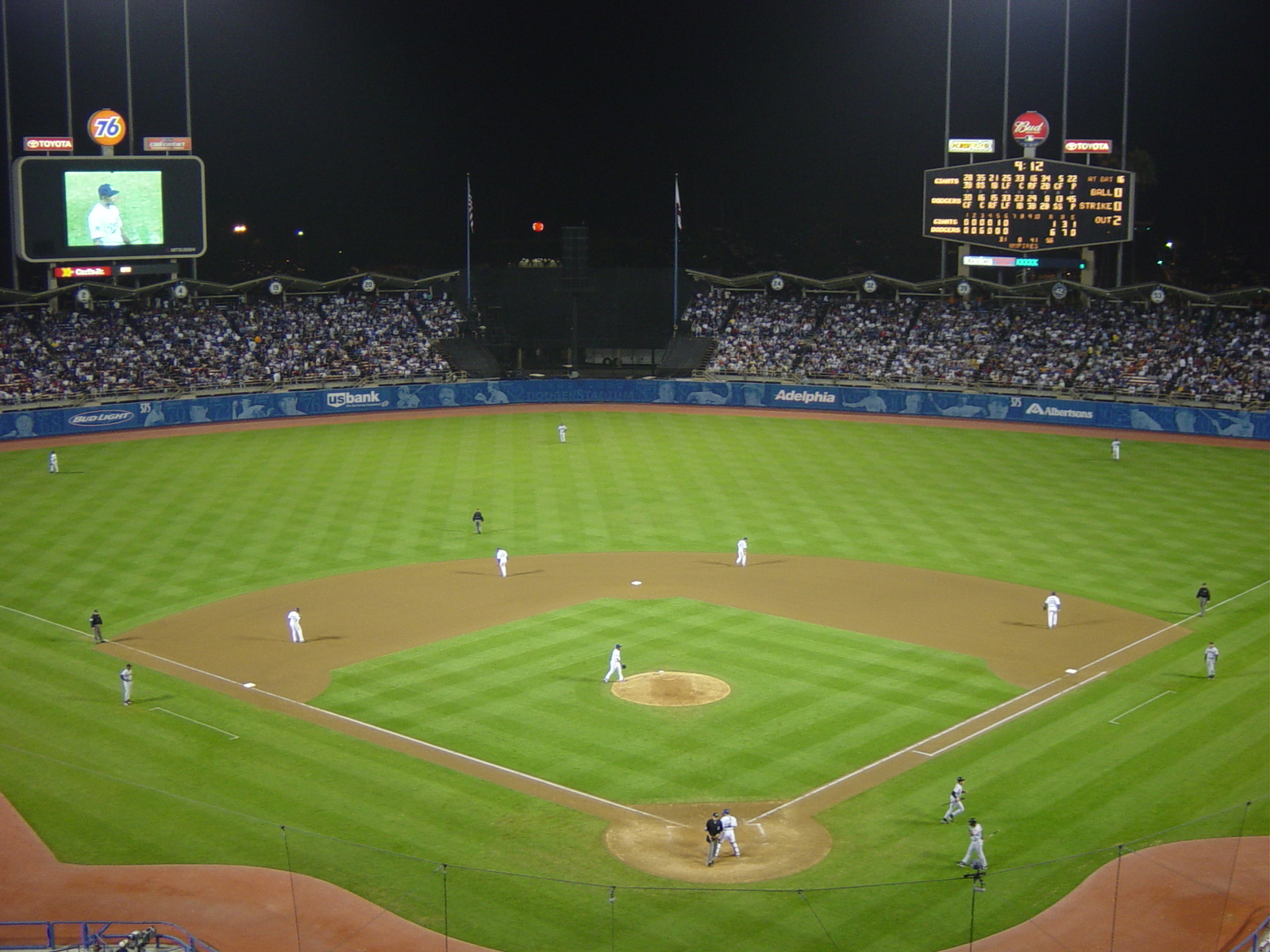
Dodger Stadium in 2002

==== Historical reputation ====
For various reasons, Dodger Stadium has long enjoyed a reputation as a pitchers' park. The park has been home to 13 no-hitters, including two perfect games (by the Dodgers' Sandy Koufax in 1965 and by Dennis Martínez of the former Montreal Expos in 1991). Pitchers such as Sandy Koufax, Don Drysdale, Don Sutton, Fernando Valenzuela, and Orel Hershiser became superstars after arriving in Los Angeles. In addition, players have hit for the cycle just twice in Dodger Stadium (Jim Fregosi in 1964 and Orlando Hudson in 2009).

At first, the relatively deep outfield dimensions were a factor, with the power alleys being about 380 feet (120 m). Home plate was moved 10 feet (3.0 m) toward center field in 1969, but that move also expanded foul ground by 10 feet (3.0 m), a tradeoff which helped to offset the increased likelihood of home runs caused by the decreased field dimensions.

Night games at Dodger Stadium are said to be particularly pitcher-friendly due to the so-called "marine layer effect." According to the marine layer theory, as the sun sets, the surrounding air at Dodger and Angel Stadiums cools quickly due to the ocean climate, becoming more dense. As a result, deep fly balls that might otherwise be home runs during the day instead often remain in play becoming outs. Although Torii Hunter estimated that the marine layer can decrease fly ball distance by 15 feet, two researchers concluded in 2017 that while "the marine layer has a statistically significant effect on flyball distance [in Petco Park and Oakland Coliseum] ... the effect size is around six feet," and Dodger Stadium's marine layer effect was close to zero. From 2022 to 2024, Dodger Stadium's night-game home run park factor was 126 (i.e., the stadium inflated home runs by 26%), the second-highest in MLB.

==== Dimensions ====
Although the distance to center field has been marked at 395 feet since 1973, it is still actually 400 feet (120 m) to center, as has been the case since 1969. Two 395-foot (120 m) signs that were erected in 1973 are to the left and right of dead center. However, curvature of the fence between the posted distance signs is not exactly radial from home plate, thus the distance from home plate directly to center field is most likely 5 feet (1.5 m) farther than the posted 395 feet (120 m). As of 2025, the center field distance of 395 feet (120 m) is indicated at straight away center field.

With the opening of Citi Field and the demolition of Shea Stadium in 2009, Dodger Stadium became the only stadium with symmetrical outfield dimensions remaining in the National League. The only other symmetrical field is Kauffman Stadium in Kansas City.

==== Transition from pitchers' park to neutral venue ====
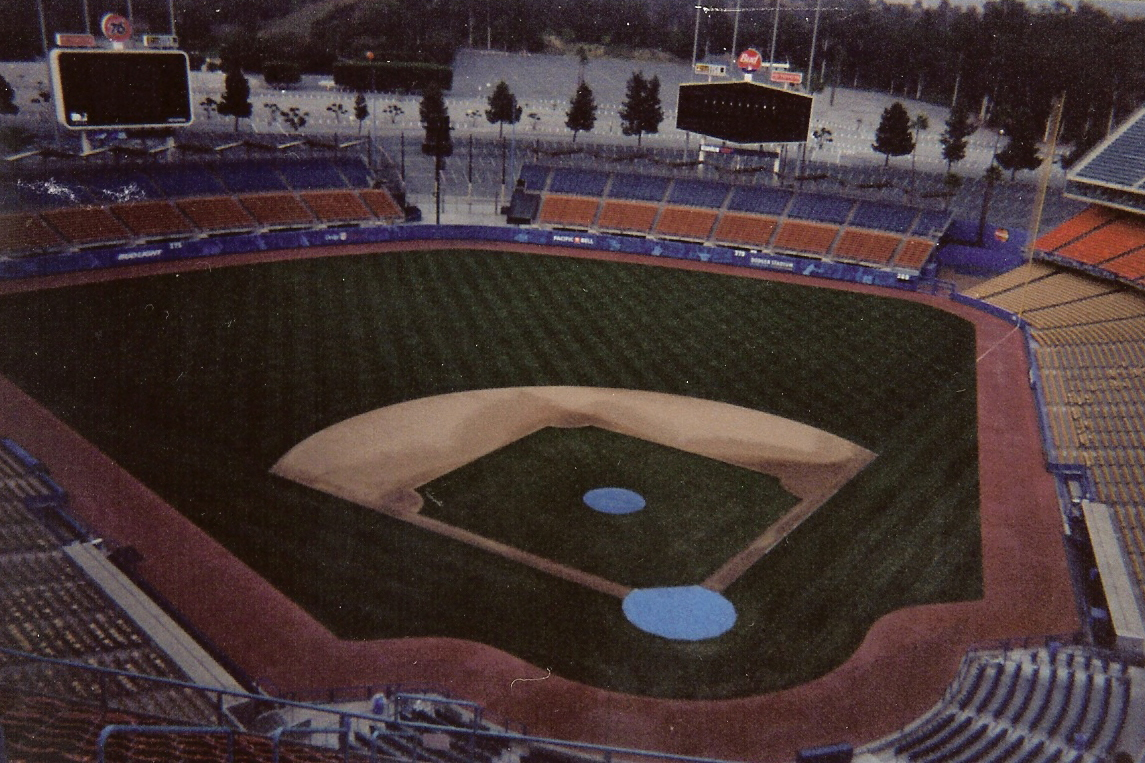
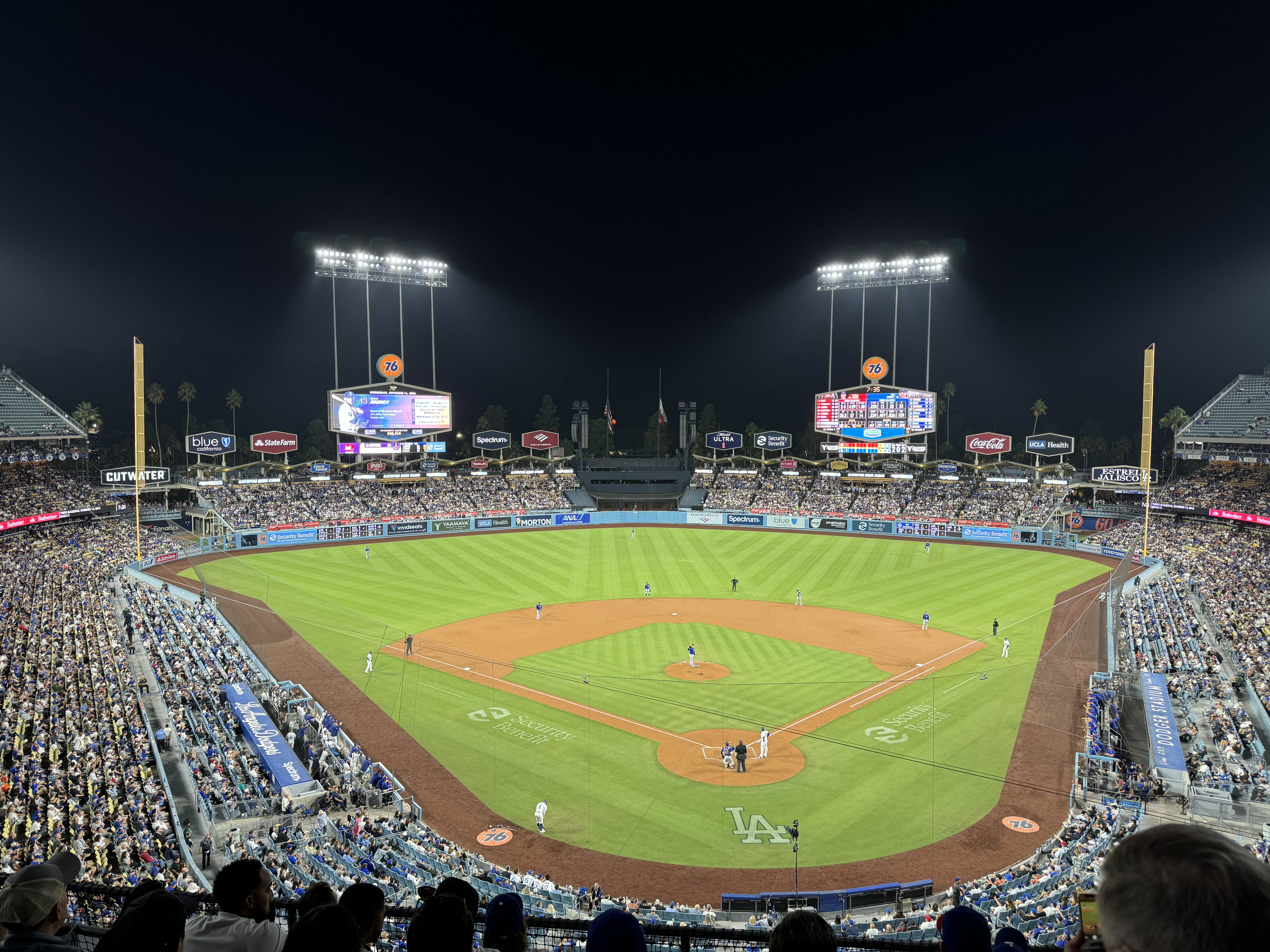
Dodger Stadium in 2000 (left) and 2024. Note the change in foul territory that took place during the 2004-05 offseason.

Following the 1968 "Year of the Pitcher," MLB issued league-wide changes to favor batting, including lowering the height of the pitcher's mound. In addition, the Dodgers moved the diamond about 10 feet (3 m) towards center field, which was partially credited for generating 46 more home runs than the prior season.

According to MLB's park factor database, Dodger Stadium decreased offense by 6% from 1997 to 1999 (the first year data was reported), making it the most pitcher-friendly park in MLB during this period. However, the park actually inflated home runs by 3%, and achieved the low park factor primarily by deflating doubles (by 21%) and triples (by 45%). This effect has been attributed to the stadium's uniform outfield walls and relatively small "corners" near the foul poles. The extremely short outfield walls near the foul poles also make some balls that would bounce off the wall in other parks go for home runs.

Following the 2004 season, the Dodgers' then-owner Frank McCourt installed 1,600 high-priced field level seats, shrinking Dodger Stadium's foul territory from 30,000 square feet to 20,000 square feet. The team noted that the dimensions of the fair territory had not been changed and predicted that the stadium would remain a pitchers' park. From 2005 to 2007, MLB ranked Dodger Stadium as a balanced park, with an exactly average park factor. The stadium continued to depress doubles and triples, but inflated walks by 7%. However, from 2008 to 2010, the stadium returned to its original status as a pitchers' park, decreasing total offense by 7%. FanGraphs noted in 2018 that many other teams had been shrinking their foul territory, although Dodger Stadium still has less foul territory than most MLB ballparks. Since park factors are based on MLB averages and not absolute values, a league-wide decrease in foul territory would by definition make Dodger Stadium's limited foul territory look more pitcher-friendly.

From 2022 to 2024, MLB ranked Dodger Stadium as a balanced park once again. Although the stadium depresses walks and most types of hits, it inflates home runs by 22%. In 2024, BetMGM stated that Dodger Stadium's 395-feet centerfield distance was the third-shortest in baseball, behind only Fenway Park and Oracle Park.

== Historic events ==
=== 1963 World Series ===
The Dodgers won the 1963 World Series over the New York Yankees, sweeping the Yankees by winning game 4 by a score of 2–1. As of the 2025 season, this remains the only time the Dodgers ever clinched a World Series at Dodger Stadium.

=== 1988 National League Championship Series ===
Until 1988, Dodger Stadium had never hosted a seventh game of a postseason series. The Dodgers won Game 7 of the 1988 National League Championship Series over the New York Mets, 6–0.

Dodgers pitcher Orel Hershiser, who was named the series MVP, threw a complete-game five-hit shutout to clinch the pennant.

=== 2017 World Series ===
Until 2017, Dodger Stadium had never hosted a seventh game of the World Series. The Dodgers controversially lost Game 7 of the 2017 World Series to the Houston Astros, 5–1.

=== 2020–2021 COVID-19 testing and vaccination site ===
The stadium cancelled scheduled events in 2020 due to the COVID-19 pandemic, and became a coronavirus testing site in May of 2020, then a vaccination site in January 2021.

=== 2020 postseason games ===
In keeping with the decision of Major League Baseball to schedule postseason games for neutral, "bubble" sites in light of the pandemic, Dodger Stadium hosted all games between the Houston Astros and the Oakland Athletics in the 2020 American League Division Series.

The 2020 World Series, which pitted the Dodgers against the Tampa Bay Rays, was played in the neutral site of Globe Life Field in Arlington, Texas. To accommodate local fans, Dodger Stadium staff set up two 60 ft (18 m) high HD video screens in the parking lot and allowed up to 950 cars to enter for each World Series game. An entrance fee of $75 per car was charged, with no more than 6 occupants per car. Audio play-by-play was broadcast over an FM station. No food or drink was sold, and participants were prohibited from bringing alcohol or "partying away from their car". An estimated 2,000 fans attended each game.

=== 2025 World Series ===
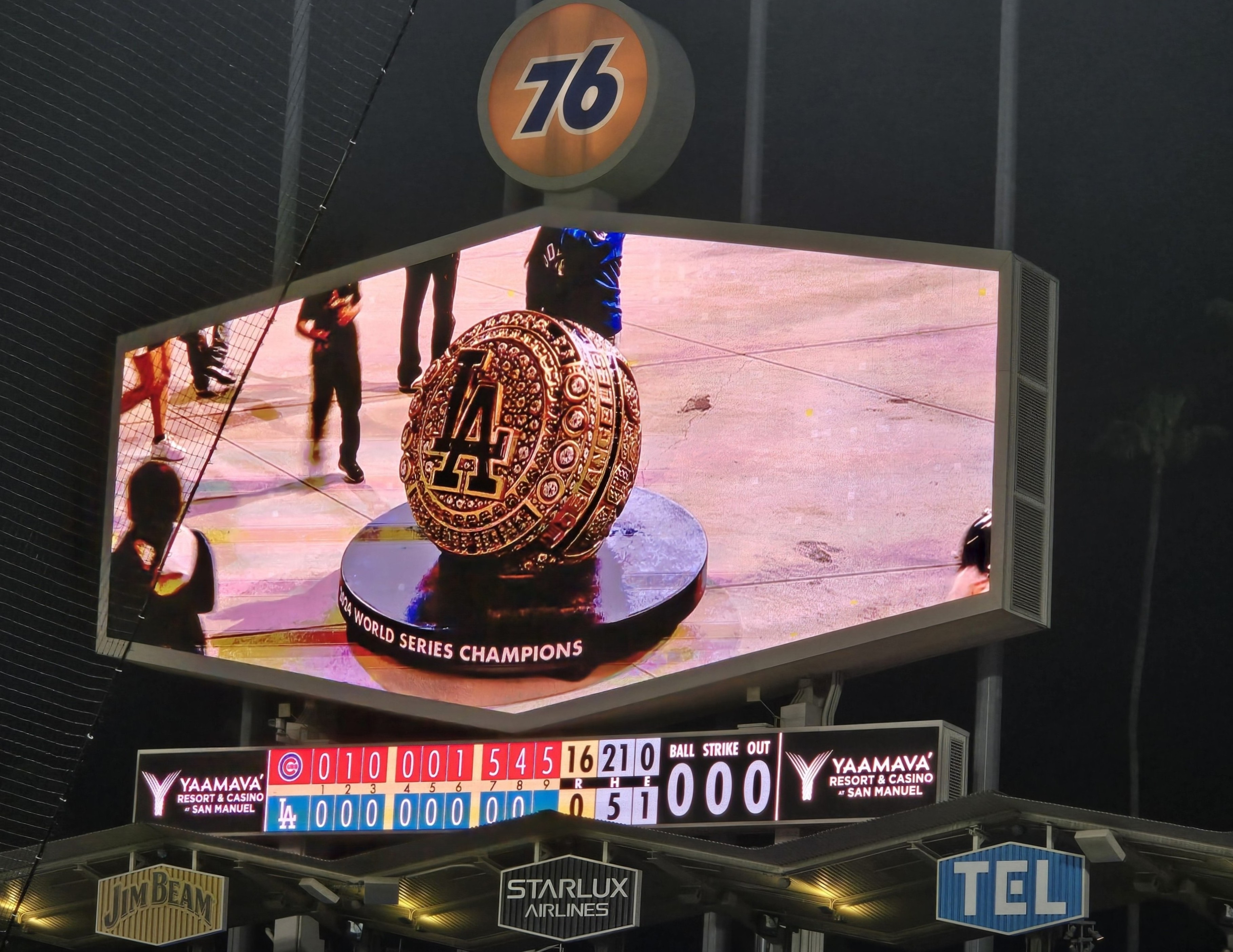
2025 World Series ring

In a very long World Series game, the Los Angeles Dodgers defeated the Toronto Blue Jays after 18 innings. The final score was 6–5. The Dodgers used ten pitchers, the Blue Jays nine. The game featured Shohei Ohtani's two homers and two doubles, and veteran pitcher Clayton Kershaw making an extra-innings relief appearance, which turned out to also be his final career appearance. It ended on a walk-off home run by Freddie Freeman.

=== No-hitters in Dodger Stadium ===
(*-Perfect game)

Date	Pitcher	Team	Opponent	Box score
May 5, 1962	Bo Belinsky	Angels	Orioles	
June 30, 1962	Sandy Koufax	Dodgers	Mets	
May 11, 1963	Sandy Koufax	Dodgers	Giants	
September 9, 1965*	Sandy Koufax	Dodgers	Cubs	
July 20, 1970	Bill Singer	Dodgers	Phillies	
June 29, 1990	Fernando Valenzuela	Dodgers	Cardinals	
July 28, 1991*	Dennis Martínez	Expos	Dodgers	
August 17, 1992	Kevin Gross	Dodgers	Giants	
April 8, 1994	Kent Mercker	Braves	Dodgers	
July 14, 1995	Ramón Martínez	Dodgers	Marlins	
June 18, 2014	Clayton Kershaw	Dodgers	Rockies	
August 30, 2015	Jake Arrieta	Cubs	Dodgers	
June 24, 2021	Combined	Cubs	Dodgers	

=== Home runs out of Dodger Stadium ===
Nine home runs have been hit completely out of Dodger Stadium. Outfielder Willie Stargell of the Pittsburgh Pirates hit two of those home runs. Stargell hit a 507-foot (155 m) home run off the Dodgers' Alan Foster on August 5, 1969, that completely cleared the right field pavilion and struck a bus parked outside the stadium. Stargell then hit a 470-foot (140 m) home run off Andy Messersmith on May 8, 1973, that landed on the right field pavilion roof and bounced into the parking lot. Dodger catcher Mike Piazza hit a 478-foot (146 m) home run off Frank Castillo of the Colorado Rockies on September 21, 1997, that landed on the left field pavilion roof and skipped under the left field video board and into the parking lot. On May 22, 1999, St. Louis Cardinals first baseman Mark McGwire cleared the left field pavilion with a 483-foot (147 m) home run off the Dodgers' Jamie Arnold. On May 12, 2015, Giancarlo Stanton of the Miami Marlins hit a 478-foot (146 m) home run over the left-field roof off Mike Bolsinger. On September 30, 2021, Fernando Tatís Jr. hit a ball out of the stadium off the top of the left field pavilion roof. On July 21, 2024, Shohei Ohtani hit a ball 473 feet out over the right field pavilion into the center field plaza. On October 8, 2025, Kyle Schwarber of the Philadelphia Phillies hit a home run off Dodgers starter Yoshinobu Yamamoto during the 3rd game of the NLDS, which hit the roof of the right field pavilion. Most recently, on October 17, 2025, Shohei Ohtani hit another home run out of Dodger Stadium, off Chad Patrick of the Milwaukee Brewers during the 4th game of the NLCS, which also hit the roof of the right field pavilion on its way out.

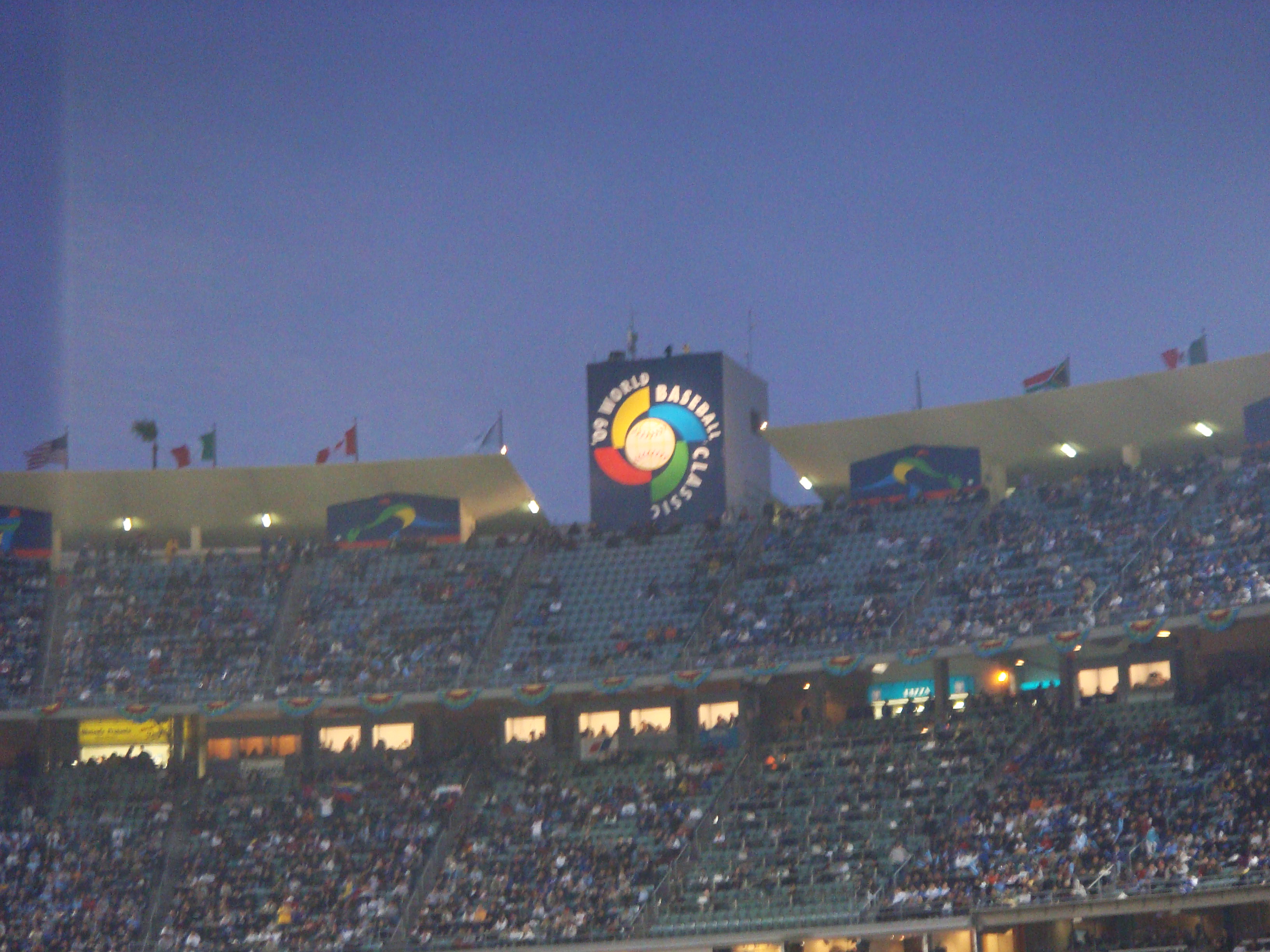
Dodger Stadium hosts the 2009 World Baseball Classic. The top of a ten-story elevator shaft bears the World Baseball Classic logo.

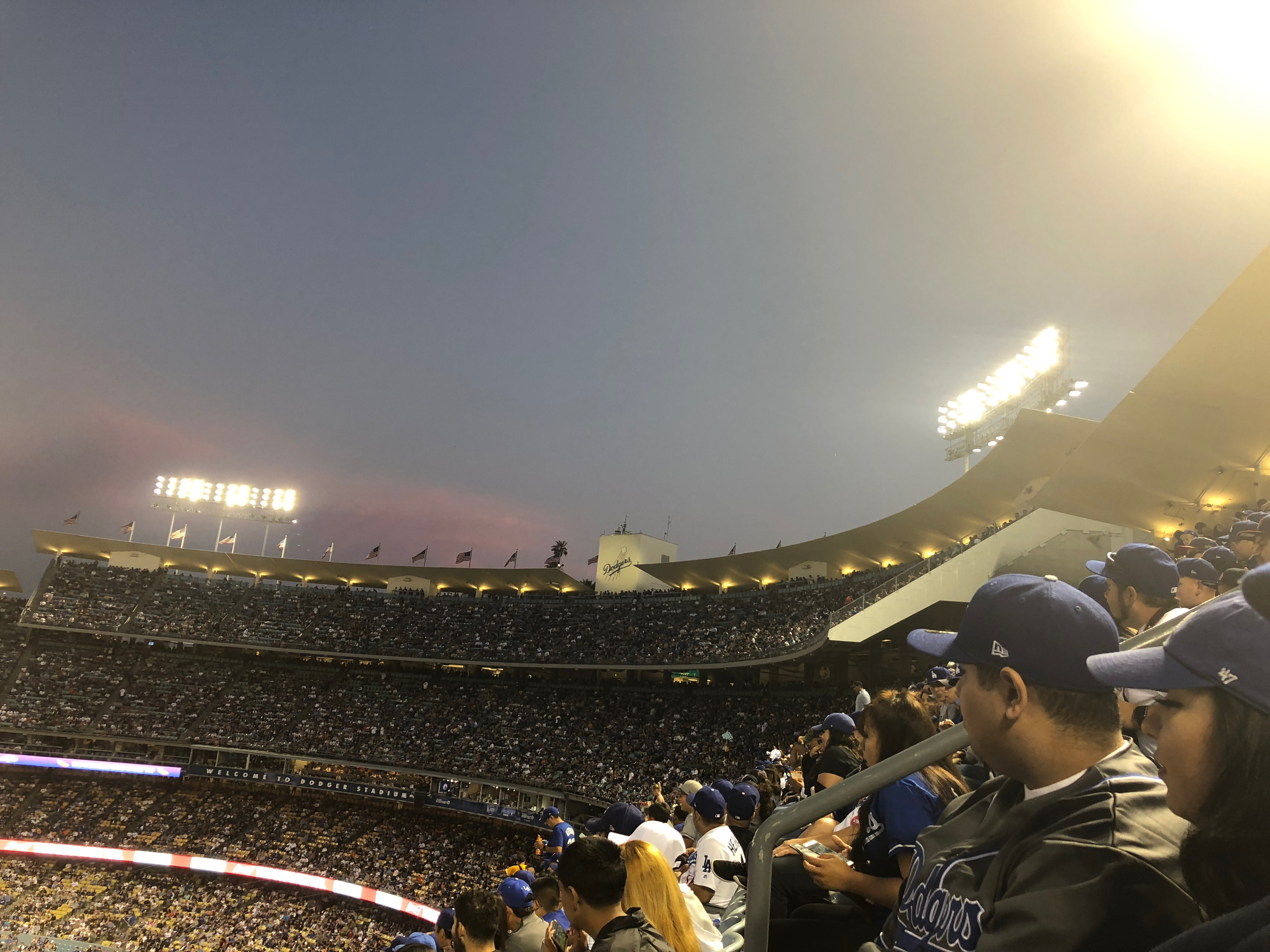
Dodger Stadium upper seating on 6/15/18 vs. the San Francisco Giants

== Notable events ==
=== Park usage ===
Dodger Stadium has also staged other sporting events such as boxing, a basketball game featuring the Harlem Globetrotters and a ski-jumping exhibition, as well as the baseball competition of the 1984 Summer Olympic Games and is currently designated to host baseball for the 2028 Olympic Games.

==== Baseball ====
In 1992, baseball games from April 30 to May 3 against the Montreal Expos were postponed due to the 1992 Los Angeles riots. Three consecutive days of double headers were held later in the season on July 6 to 8.

==== Soccer ====
Dodger Stadium hosted a soccer doubleheader on August 3, 2013, part of the 2013 International Champions Cup, featuring Real Madrid of Spain, Everton of England, Juventus of Italy and Los Angeles Galaxy of Major League Soccer in a tournament semi-final. The field dimensions were from the third base side to right field; temporary grass was covered on the pitcher's mound and the infield. The tournament was a semi-final and Real Madrid defeated Everton 2-1 and Los Angeles Galaxy defeated Juventus 3–1.

Date	Winning Team	Result	Losing Team	Tournament	Spectators
August 3, 2013	(United States) Los Angeles Galaxy	3–1	(Italy) Juventus	2013 International Champions Cup	40,681
August 3, 2013	(Spain) Real Madrid	2–1	(England) Everton	2013 International Champions Cup	40,681

==== Hockey ====
Dodger Stadium hosted its first National Hockey League game between the Los Angeles Kings and the Anaheim Ducks on January 25, 2014, as a part of the 2014 NHL Stadium Series. The Ducks won the game 3–0 in front of 54,099 fans. In addition, the rock band Kiss played songs before the game and during its first intermission.

Date	Winning Team	Result	Losing Team	Event	Attendance
January 25, 2014	Anaheim Ducks	3–0	Los Angeles Kings	2014 NHL Stadium Series	54,099

==== Boxing ====
On March 21, 1963, Ultiminio "Sugar" Ramos won the WBC and WBA featherweight titles from Davey Moore in ten rounds. Moore died days after this fight. Also on the card, Roberto Cruz KO'd Raymundo "Battling" Torres in one round to win the WBA Junior Welterweight title.

==== Cricket ====
On November 15, 2015, Dodger Stadium hosted the third and final game of the Cricket All-Stars Series 2015, featuring many retired cricket players from around the world and led by great cricket legends Sachin Tendulkar and Shane Warne. Warne's Warriors defeated Sachin's Blasters by 4 wickets to sweep the three-game series. The ends were named after Sandy Koufax and Don Sutton, two Hall of Fame pitchers for LA Dodgers.

==== 1984 and 2028 Summer Olympics ====
Dodger Stadium hosted Baseball at the 1984 Summer Olympics which was featured as a demonstration sport. During the 2028 Summer Olympics, the stadium will host the Olympic baseball competition for a second time. The stadium hosted the opening ceremony of the 1991 U.S. Olympic Festival.

=== Concerts ===
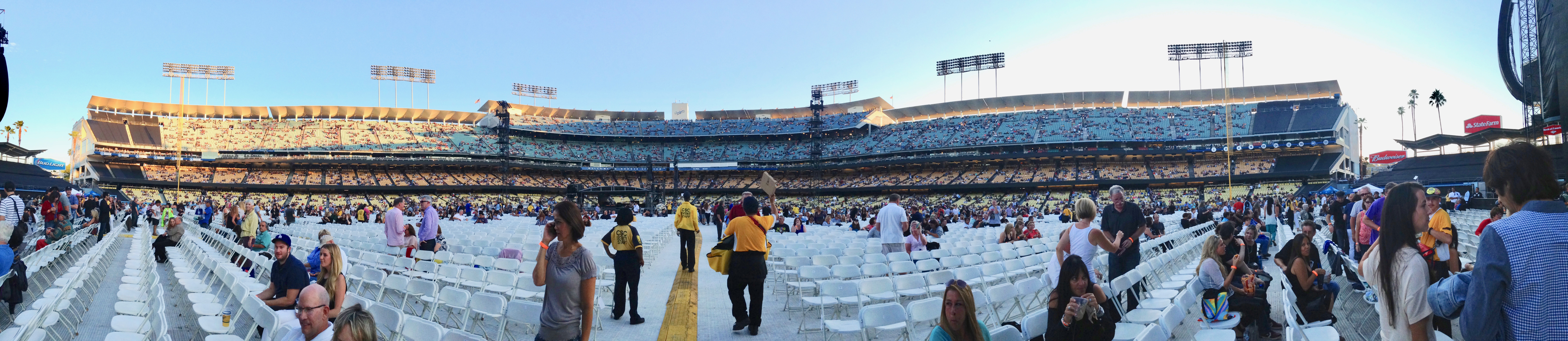
Dodger Stadium filling up for the Paul McCartney concert in 2014

Dodger Stadium has hosted many of the world's top musical artists, including Beyoncé, The Cure, Kiss, The Rolling Stones, The Beatles, Bee Gees, Elton John, Lady Gaga, Simon and Garfunkel, David Bowie, Green Day, Fall Out Boy, Weezer, Madonna, Genesis, Guns N' Roses, Eric Clapton, Depeche Mode, U2, Dave Matthews Band, Bruce Springsteen and the E Street Band, Blackpink, Dead & Company, The Fab Four, and Michael Jackson with The Jacksons. On October 25 and 26, 1975, Elton John performed two sold-out concerts; these are widely regarded as two of his most famous shows. The Three Tenors — José Carreras, Plácido Domingo and Luciano Pavarotti — gave a one-night-only show at Dodger Stadium on July 16, 1994, as a part of celebrations for the 1994 FIFA World Cup. It was watched by a billion people worldwide. In July 2017, it hosted the Classic West concert, of the first night featured The Eagles in their full first concert (after the 2016 death of founding member Glenn Frey), with Deacon Frey and American country artist Vince Gill as new members, as well as supporting acts The Doobie Brothers and Steely Dan. The second night featured Earth, Wind & Fire, Journey and Fleetwood Mac. On July 13, 2019, Paul McCartney performed at Dodger Stadium as part of his Freshen Up tour, with Ringo Starr and Joe Walsh as guest performers. In 2022, Gabriel "Fluffy" Iglesias became the first stand-up comedian to perform at Dodger Stadium. Lady Gaga's sold-out concert at the venue on September 11, 2022, as part of The Chromatica Ball (2022) was filmed for a concert film released in May 2024 through HBO and its streaming service, Max. Elton John sold out his final three concerts in North America as part of the Farewell Yellow Brick Road Tour (2018–2023), the final of which was live-streamed on Disney+, and added to their library for replay. The film won the award for Outstanding Variety Special at the 75th Annual Primetime Emmy Awards, allowing John to become an EGOT recipient for having won at least one Emmy, a Grammy, an Oscar, and a Tony.

During the COVID-19 pandemic, some events were held at the stadium, including a Quarantunes Zoom concert, on May 1, 2020, led by Richard Weitz, in partnership with the Los Angeles Dodgers Foundation. The event featured both live talent at the stadium and remote talent via Zoom. The concert began with a set from the pitcher’s mound by DJ Cassidy, while clad in a Dodgers jacket, followed by live performances by Robin Thicke and El DeBarge. Other celebrities in attendance included Ted Danson and Mary Steenburgen, while others appeared remotely, including Magic Johnson, Dave Roberts, several past and current LA Dodgers, and Bob Costas. Some Dodgers memorabilia was auctioned off and $1.1 million was raised for the Los Angeles Regional Food Bank.

Community Organized Relief Effort (CORE) produced a streamed Rock 'N' Relief concert series, curated by Linda Perry, and held March 5 and 6, 2021, to raise funds for mobile COVID-19 vaccination units to benefit those unable to travel to centers. The concerts featured both live and virtual performances by Foo Fighters, Sheryl Crow, Carly Simon, DeadMau5, Miguel, Macy Gray and scores of other musicians, performing live to those lined up in cars for a vaccine at Dodger Stadium, the largest US vaccination site.

=== In music video ===
Fleetwood Mac's music video for the song "Tusk" was recorded and filmed at the empty stadium in 1979.

In 2023, the Baby Keem and Kendrick Lamar music video for “The Hillbillies” features Tyler, the Creator in front of Dodger Stadium.

=== In film and TV ===
- A shootout scene in the 1972 film Hickey & Boggs, starring Bill Cosby and Robert Culp takes place at Dodger Stadium.
- The ending of the 1981 film Condorman takes place at Dodger Stadium.
- The ending of the 1985 film Better Off Dead takes place at Dodger Stadium.
- The baseball scenes from the first Naked Gun film were filmed at Dodger Stadium, although the California Angels were represented as the home team in the film. (The Angels played their home games at "Chavez Ravine" before Anaheim Stadium was built.)
- This was the starting point of a popular reality show, The Amazing Race in its fourth season.
- The parking lot of Dodger Stadium was used in the 2001 movie The Fast and the Furious, in which Brian O'Conner (Paul Walker) drifts his 1995 Mitsubishi Eclipse around the parking lot. It later reappeared in its 2023 sequel Fast X, in which Dominic Toretto (Vin Diesel) uses his 1970 Dodge Charger R/T to teach his son Brian Marcos (Leo Abelo Perry) to drift, again in the parking lot.
- Dodger Stadium was used as the model for Metropolis's baseball stadium in the 2006 film Superman Returns. The end of the airplane rescue scene was filmed at Dodger Stadium, and a CGI backdrop for the city was added behind the outfield.
- The stadium also appeared in the 2003 film The Core during the scene where the space shuttle takes an unexpected crash landing.
- In a scene from the 2007 film Transformers, an empty Dodger Stadium is depicted being hit by the Autobot Jazz's protoform, which crashes through the upper deck and lands in the outfield. Though empty, the stadium's lights are on.
- In the 2010 film Takers, after fleeing in a helicopter from the initial bank robbery, the crew flies to the parking lot at Dodger Stadium where their escape vehicles are parked. They then blow up the helicopter in the parking lot at Dodger Stadium
- In the closing scene of the 2012 film Rock of Ages, Dodger Stadium is seen hosting a concert for the rock band Arsenal, fronted by Stacee Jaxx (played by Tom Cruise).
- In a 1963 episode of Mister Ed titled "Leo Durocher meets Mister Ed", Ed offers hitting tips to Dodgers coach Leo Durocher ahead of a big game.
- Curb Your Enthusiasm filmed there in May 2003. Raw footage from the episode was used to prove the innocence of a man accused of a murder that took place while he was watching a game at the stadium. The incident was highlighted in the documentary "Long Shot (2017 film)."
- In the 2023 movie Creed III, the championship fight between Adonis Creed and Dame Anderson takes place at Dodger Stadium. In the movie, it is known as the "Battle for Los Angeles."
- In the 2019 biographical musical fantasy drama film Rocketman, Elton John (played by Taron Egerton) is seen performing at the stadium moments after his suicide attempt in 1975. The stadium was created with computer-generated imagery, along with the fans.
- The field was featured in Season 13 of MasterChef.

=== In gaming ===
- The stadium appears in the 2019 mobile game Mario Kart Tour as part of the "Los Angeles Laps" race course. This course was later added to the game Mario Kart 8 Deluxe.
- In Nicktoons MLB, it is one of the featured real-life ballparks.

=== Holiday Festival ===
On November 8, 2021, the Dodgers announced the "2021 Dodger Holiday Festival" event. The event was held most nightly from November 26 to December 31. The event included an ice skating rink, scenic and light displays, food and beverages, and photos with Santa Claus.

=== Other events ===
- Pope John Paul II celebrated Mass at Dodger Stadium on September 16, 1987.
- Greg Laurie held his Harvest Crusades at Dodger Stadium in 2011 and 2012.
- Tyler, the Creator's music festival Camp Flog Gnaw has been held at the grounds outside Dodger Stadium since 2018.

== Access ==
The stadium is surrounded by expansive parking lots and before a game, bumper to bumper traffic winds through the hilly streets to reach the stadium from several directions. The Chinatown station is the nearest station of the Los Angeles Metro Rail system. From there, it is a little over a mile walk with a pedestrian bridge available at the north end of Yale Street over the 110 Freeway.

=== Dodger Stadium Express ===
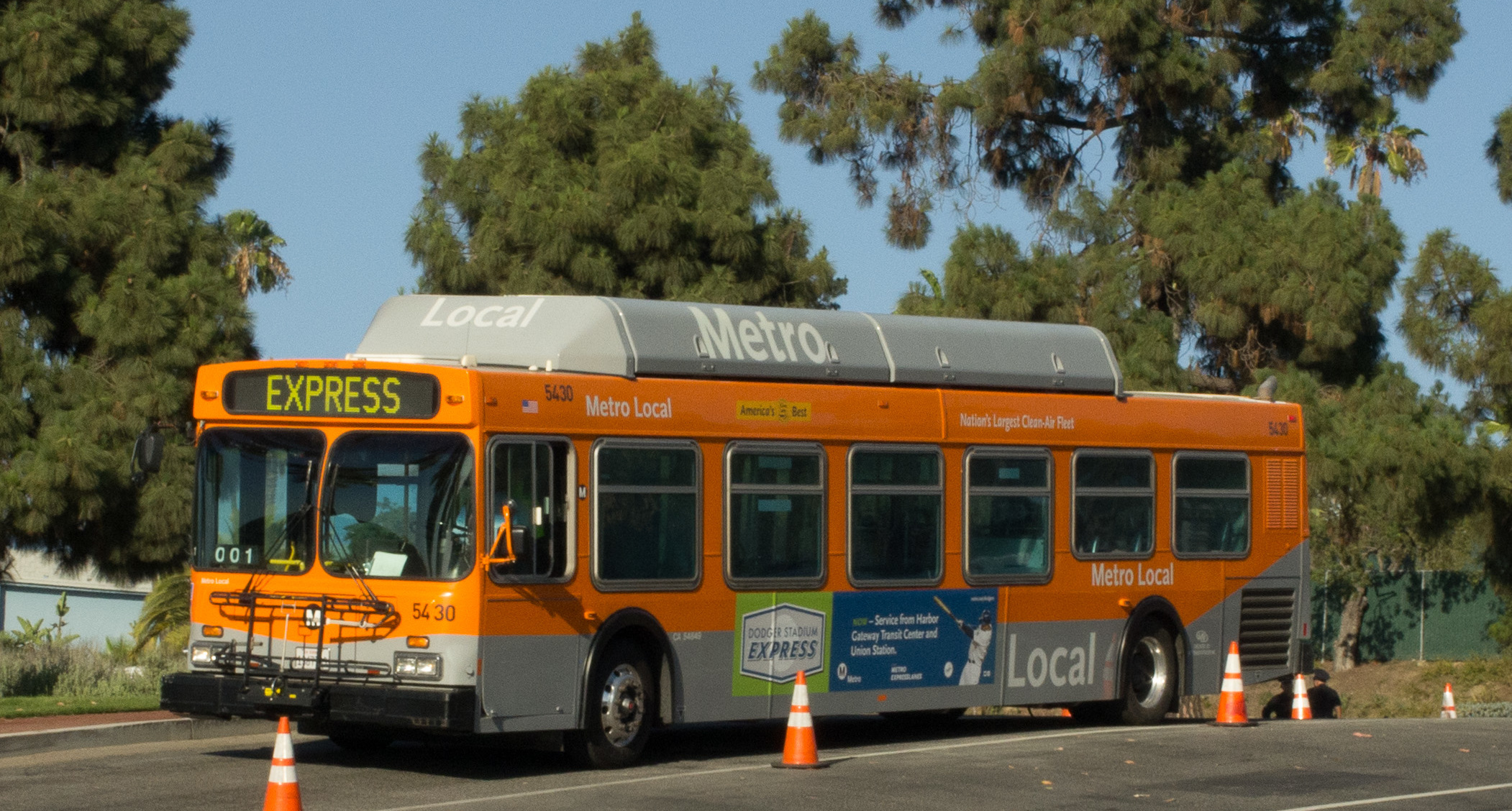
Dodger Stadium Express bus at Dodger Stadium

The Dodger Stadium Express is a free bus service operated by the Los Angeles County Metropolitan Transportation Authority (Metro) that transports ticket holders to and from Dodger Stadium during home games. The service is funded by the Mobile Source Air Pollution Reduction Review Committee and toll revenue from the Metro ExpressLanes. Service begins 2 1/2 hours before the start of the game. Return service operates after the end of the seventh inning and continues until 45 minutes after the final out or 20 minutes after any post-game events.

==== Union Station route ====
The Union Station route operates non-stop between Union Station and Dodger Stadium, using a dedicated bus lane along Sunset Boulevard and Vin Scully Avenue. Buses board on the west side of Union Station, in front of the Fred Harvey Room adjacent to Alameda Street. Service from Union Station operates every 5 to 10 minutes until the end of the second inning. Buses on this route stop at the Center Field and Top Deck entrances. Union Station is served by the Metro A, B, D, and J Lines, numerous Metro Bus routes, and offers regional rail connections via Metrolink and Amtrak.

==== South Bay route ====
The South Bay route connects the South Bay to Dodger Stadium via the Harbor Transitway. Buses stop at Slauson, Manchester, Harbor Freeway, Rosecrans, and the Harbor Gateway Transit Center. These stations are also served by the J Line, and connections to the C Line are available at Harbor Freeway station. Service from the South Bay operates every 30 minutes, with the final departure from Harbor Gateway scheduled for game time. Buses on this route stop at the Right Field entrance.

=== Proposed gondola ===
The Los Angeles Aerial Rapid Transit is a proposed aerial gondola connecting Union Station to the stadium with an intermediate station at the Los Angeles State Historic Park. The line will also serve Elysian Park adjacent to the stadium.

Preceding station	Los Angeles Aerial Rapid Transit	Following station
Terminus	LA ART Proposed opening 2028	Chinatown toward Union Station

== See also ==
- List of current Major League Baseball stadiums

Events and tenants
Preceded by Los Angeles Memorial Coliseum	Home of the Los Angeles Dodgers; 1962–present	Succeeded by Current
Preceded by Wrigley Field	Home of the Los Angeles Angels; 1962–1965	Succeeded by Anaheim Stadium
Preceded by Kingdome; Coors Field	Host of the All-Star Game; 1980; 2022	Succeeded by Cleveland Stadium; T-Mobile Park
Preceded by Petco Park; AT&T Park	World Baseball Classic Final Venue; 2009; 2017	Succeeded by AT&T Park; LoanDepot Park
