= Cricket All-Stars =

Twenty20 cricket series in 2015

- Date: November 2015
- Location: United States
- Result: Warriors won 3–0
- Player of the series: (Sri Lanka) Kumar Sangakkara
Teams
- Sachin's Blasters: Warne's Warriors
Captains
Most runs
Most wickets

Cricket All-Stars (also known as Cricket All-Stars Series) was an exhibition Twenty20 cricket series took place in the United States in 2015. The series features two lineups of renowned retired cricket players from around the world, led by cricket icons – Sachin Tendulkar of India and Shane Warne of Australia.

== Background ==
The inaugural series was held across three cities in the United States. A second series was announced to be held in September/October 2017 but later it got scrapped due to issues between Sachin Tendulkar & Shane Warne; it hasn't returned thereafter.

== Teams ==
The All-Stars Series was a set of games played between Sachin's Blasters led by Sachin Tendulkar and Warne's Warriors led by Shane Warne. The two captains selected their respective squads by randomly drawing out the player names on 5 November 2015 at Times Square.

Sachin's Blasters	Warne's Warriors
(India) Sachin Tendulkar (c); (India) Virender Sehwag; (India) VVS Laxman; (Cricket West Indies) Brian Lara; (India) Sourav Ganguly; (Sri Lanka) Mahela Jayawardene; (Cricket West Indies) Carl Hooper; (Pakistan) Moin Khan (wk); (Sri Lanka) Muttiah Muralitharan; (England) Graeme Swann; (Cricket West Indies) Curtly Ambrose; (South Africa) Shaun Pollock; (Australia) Glenn McGrath; (South Africa) Lance Klusener; (Pakistan) Shoaib Akhtar	(Australia) Shane Warne (c); (Australia) Matthew Hayden; (England) Michael Vaughan; (Australia) Ricky Ponting; (South Africa) Jonty Rhodes; (South Africa) Jacques Kallis; (Australia) Andrew Symonds; (Sri Lanka) Kumar Sangakkara (wk); (Pakistan) Saqlain Mushtaq; (New Zealand) Daniel Vettori; (Cricket West Indies) Courtney Walsh; (Pakistan) Wasim Akram; (South Africa) Allan Donald; (India) Ajit Agarkar; (New Zealand) Shane Bond

== Venues ==
All three matches of the series played in baseball stadiums. Initially in June 2015, Wrigley Field in Chicago and Yankee Stadium in New York were booked as venues, along with Dodger Stadium in Los Angeles. However, in October 2015, the former two venues were replaced by New York Mets' home ballpark Citi Field and Houston Astros' home ballpark Minute Maid Park. The first match was a day game in New York, while the second and third played under lights in Houston and Los Angeles respectively.

A curator from New Zealand was hired to prepare drop-in pitches in Minneapolis to be delivered to the three stadiums.

New York City	Houston	Los Angeles
Citi Field	Minute Maid Park	Dodger Stadium
Coordinates: 40°45′25″N 73°50′45″W	Coordinates: 29°45′25″N 95°21′20″W	Coordinates: 34°4′25″N 118°14′24″W
Capacity: 41,922	Capacity: 41,574	Capacity: 56,000

== Series history ==
Year	Host	Result	MVP	Attendance
2015	United States		Kumar Sangakkara	86,351

== Awards ==
Year	Most valuable player	Most runs	Most wickets
2015	Kumar Sangakkara	Kumar Sangakkara (153)	Andrew Symonds (8)

=== Umpires ===
Marais Erasmus from South Africa who is currently a member of the ICC Elite Umpire Panel and Simon Taufel and Steve Davis from Australia who were former (now retired) members of the ICC Elite Umpire Panel are the three experienced umpires who were selected to perform the duties of the on-field umpires and the third umpire in all the three games on a rotation basis.

=== Fixtures ===
==== 1st match ====
7 November 2015
Scorecard

Sachin's Blasters; 140/8 (20 overs)	v	Warne's Warriors; 141/4 (17.2 overs)
Virender Sehwag 55 (22); Andrew Symonds 3/15 (2 overs)		Ricky Ponting 48* (38); Shoaib Akhtar 2/26 (4 overs)

Warne's Warriors won by 6 wickets
Citi Field, New York
Umpires: Marais Erasmus (South Africa) and Simon Taufel (Australia)
Player of the match: Shane Warne (Warne's Warriors)

- Warne's Warriors won the toss and elected to field.
- Attendance 36,843

==== 2nd match ====
11 November 2015 (D/N)
Scorecard

Warne's Warriors; 262/5 (20 overs)	v	Sachin's Blasters; 205/8 (20 overs)
Kumar Sangakkara 70 (30); Lance Klusener 2/45 (3 overs)		Shaun Pollock 55 (22); Andrew Symonds 4/70 (4 overs)

Warne's Warriors won by 57 runs
Minute Maid Park, Houston
Umpires: Marais Erasmus (South Africa) and Steve Davis (Australia)
Player of the match: Kumar Sangakkara (Warne's Warriors)

- Sachin's Blasters won the toss and elected to field.
- Attendance 27,655

==== 3rd match ====
14 November 2015 (D/N)
Scorecard

Sachin's Blasters; 219/5 (20 overs)	v	Warne's Warriors; 224/6 (19.5 overs)
Sachin Tendulkar 56 (27); Daniel Vettori 3/33 (4 overs)		Jacques Kallis 47 (23); Graeme Swann 2/21 (4 overs)

Warne's Warriors won by 4 wickets
Dodger Stadium, Los Angeles
Umpires: Simon Taufel (Australia) and Steve Davis (Australia)
Player of the match: Jacques Kallis (Warne's Warriors)

- Sachin's Blasters won the toss and elected to bat.
- Attendance 21,853

== Trophy ==
The All-Stars Trophy and team shirts were unveiled by Tendulkar and Warne along with their respective team's player rosters, on 5 November 2015 in Times Square, United States.

== Broadcasting ==
Country/Region	TV broadcaster(s)
Australia	Nine Network
India	Star Sports 2
Middle East	OSN Sports Cricket HD
Pakistan	TEN Sports
South Africa	SuperSport 2
United Kingdom	Sky Sports 3
New Zealand	Sky Sports 4
United States	ESPN3
