= All-you-can-eat seats =

Seats in a stadium that include unlimited food and drink

External videos
- "All You Can Eat at Petco Park" (video)

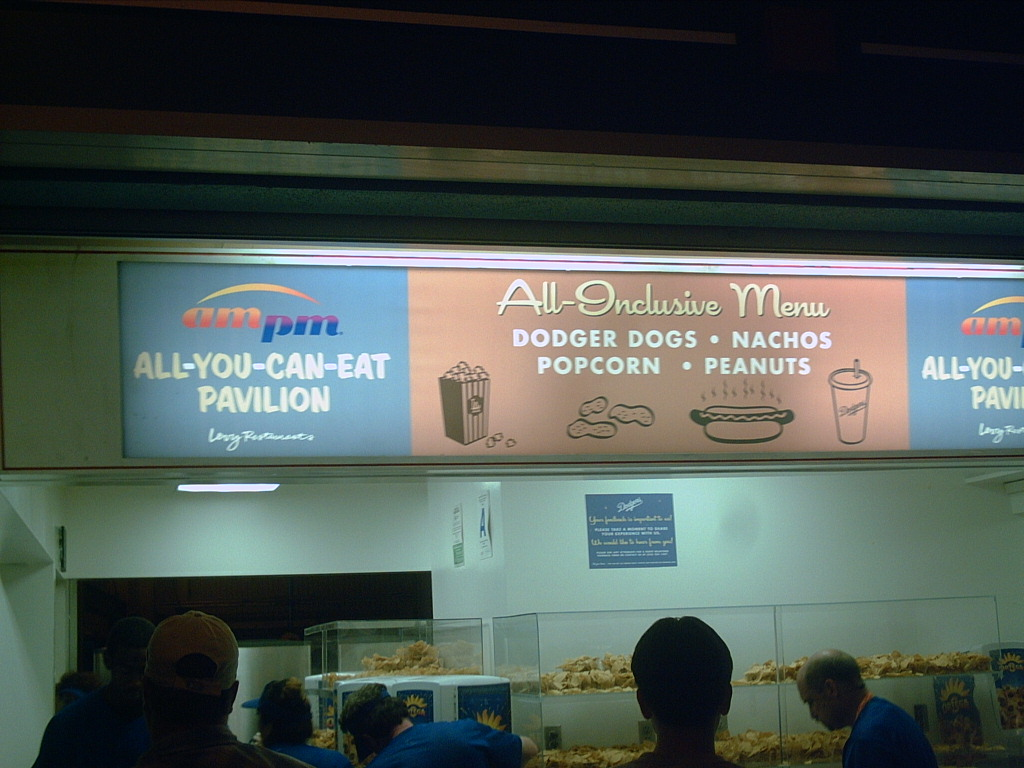
All-you-can-eat buffet at Dodger Stadium

All-you-can-eat seats, also called all-inclusive sections, are blocks of seats in a stadium or arena in which seat holders are entitled to unlimited food and drink (typically fast food and junk food including hot dogs, nachos, popcorn, peanuts, soft drinks, and bottled water) before and during a game. Typically located in less desirable areas of the venue, such as the bleachers and upper decks, all-you-can-eat (AYCE) seats are priced approximately 50% higher than seats in the same section, but are viewed by patrons as a bargain considering the high cost of concession food and drinks.

The first AYCE section was introduced at Dodger Stadium in 2007. The trend spread to 19 of the 30 Major League Baseball parks by 2010 and numerous Minor League Baseball parks by 2012. While most common among baseball stadiums, by 2008 AYCE seats were also inaugurated in venues of other sports, including six National Basketball Association and nine National Hockey League arenas, Canadian Football League stadiums, and several NASCAR racetracks. The National Football League remains the only North American major pro sports league where no stadiums have implemented AYCE seats.

Luxury boxes and club seating are typically all-inclusive with unlimited food and drink during the duration of the event; however, they are not referred to as AYCE seats due to their desirable location in the venue and higher ticket price relative to other seating. Furthermore, the menu for luxury box and club seating is higher quality, ranging from buffets to chef-prepared gourmet dishes and fresh produce (as opposed to AYCE which consists mostly of fast food and junk food), and often with servers to cater to these patrons.

== History ==
The Los Angeles Dodgers introduced the first Major League Baseball AYCE section in April 2007 after conducting three pilots during the 2006 season. Soon after, the Atlanta Braves, Baltimore Orioles, Kansas City Royals, and Texas Rangers converted their under-utilized seats to AYCE seats. The concept spread to 13 Major League Baseball parks in 2008 and 19 parks in 2010.

Major League Baseball teams offering all-you-can-eat seats include the Arizona Diamondbacks, Atlanta Braves, Baltimore Orioles, Cincinnati Reds, Detroit Tigers, Houston Astros, Kansas City Royals, Los Angeles Dodgers, Miami Marlins, Minnesota Twins, Pittsburgh Pirates, San Diego Padres, Tampa Bay Rays, Texas Rangers, and Toronto Blue Jays.

Beginning with the 2018 NFL season, the Detroit Lions introduced Club 200. This premium seating option includes all-you-can-eat items such as hot dogs, popcorn, nachos, pretzels, chips, cotton candy, salad and soda. The section in Ford Field also includes two drink tickets and a dedicated giveaway item at each game.

== Description ==
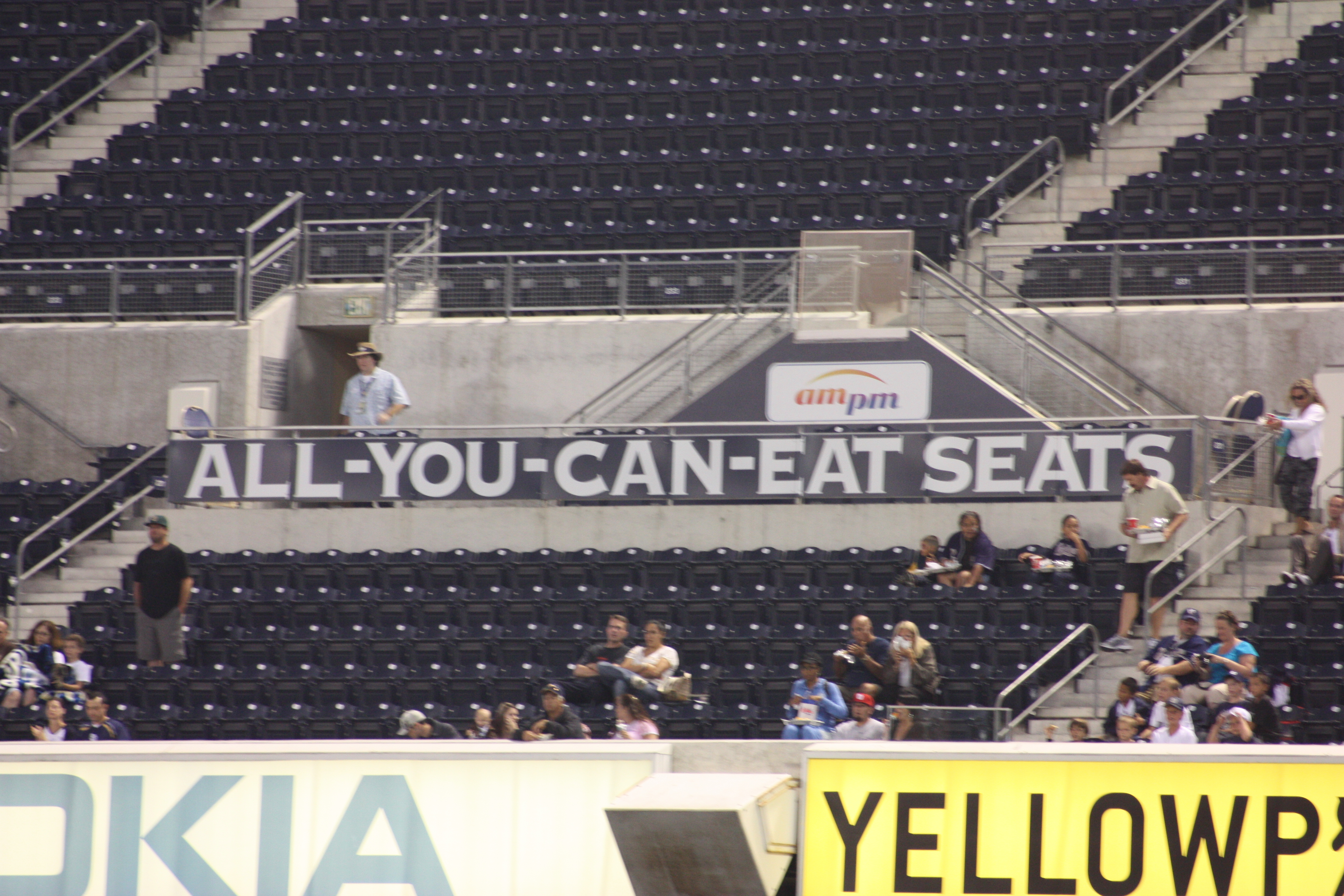
All-you-can-eat seats at Petco Park, 2009

The typical all-you-can-eat seat-holder at Turner Field consumes "3.35 hot dogs, one 20-ounce soda, one 7.9-ounce bag of peanuts, one 3-ounce order of nachos and 32 ounces of popcorn".

— USA Today, March 7, 2008

All-you-can-eat seats are typically located in "distant bleacher or upper-deck sections". Seat prices are marked up approximately 50% over the regular price of seats in that section.

The AYCE buffet generally operates from the time the stadium gates open until the beginning or end of the seventh inning. Some parks put an hourly limit on it – for example, food service is open for two hours after the first pitch at San Diego Padres games and until 9 p.m. at Minnesota Twins games. The basic menu includes traditional ballpark food such as hot dogs, nachos, peanuts, popcorn, and soft drinks. Some ballparks add other options, such as "veggie dogs" at Petco Park, green salad, ice cream, and kosher and veggie dogs (by advance request) at Oriole Park at Camden Yards, and "burgers, salads, peanut butter-filled pretzels and ice cream" at PNC Park.

Some ballparks limit the amount of food an AYCE patron can take on each trip to the buffet. At Dodger Stadium, AYCE patrons are limited to four hot dogs per visit, but can take as many soft drinks and bottles of water as they wish. At Camden Yards, patrons may take up to two of each food item on each visit. A further appeal to AYCE patrons is that the lines move quickly, as no cash transactions are involved.

At Dodger Stadium, AYCE ticket-holders enter and exit through a different gate than other ticket-holders and can access only the AYCE buffet and a set of restrooms. At other ballparks, ticket-holders wear colored wristbands to identify themselves as AYCE patrons. At Camden Yards, AYCE ticket-holders have their hand stamped.

== Popularity ==
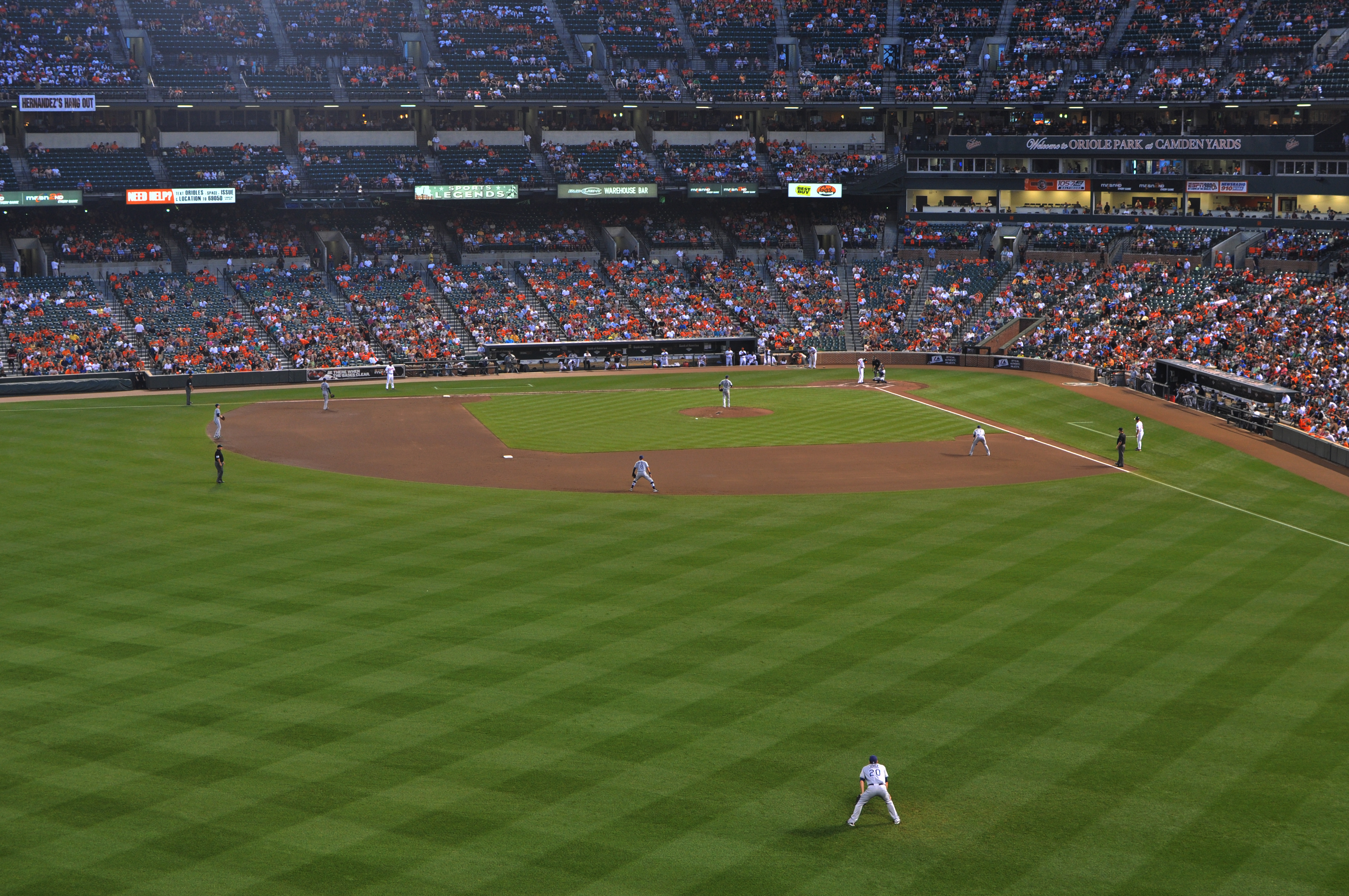
View from the all-you-can-eat seats at Oriole Park at Camden Yards

All-you-can-eat seats have successfully boosted attendance in ballparks experiencing low turnouts, as well as increased occupancy of stadium sections that were previously under-used. At Dodger Stadium, for example, before 2007 the right-field bleachers were opened only when the left-field bleachers sold out, or for group sales. Following the conversion of the right-field bleachers into an AYCE section of 3,300 seats, occupancy zoomed to 85%. The Arizona Diamondbacks boosted ticket sales by 70% when it created a left-field AYCE section in 2009, while the Houston Astros averaged 95% capacity in its AYCE section.

From the patrons' point of view, AYCE seats are viewed as a bargain considering the added cost of ballpark food. After a few orders of hot dogs, nachos, and soft drinks, the AYCE seat pays for itself. The Atlanta Braves estimated that a typical AYCE patron in 2007 consumed 3.35 hot dogs, 20 ounces of soda, 7.9 ounces of peanuts; 3 ounces of nachos; and 32 ounces of popcorn. AYCE seats have been described as a way to indulge in junk food "with baseball as a nominal backdrop", an opportunity to eat a cheap dinner with a baseball game thrown in, and a way to feed a family on a budget. AYCE patrons have been known to engage in eating contests and to sneak food home with them.
