= Richard Weitz =

American entertainment executive

- Born: April 1969 (age 57); United States
- Education: Columbian College of Arts and Sciences
- Occupation: Co-chair
- Organization: WME Group
- Known for: Quarantunes
- Board member of: Cedars-Sinai Medical Center; Saban Community Clinic; McCallum Theatre
- Spouse: Candie Weitz
- Children: 2

Richard Weitz is a Hollywood talent agent and co-chairman of WME Group. Prior to the new parent company's formation in 2025, he was a partner and co-chairman of William Morris Endeavor (WME).

== Early life and education ==
Weitz was born in April 1969 to Stanley and Joyce Weitz. His brother, Andrew Weitz, is a style consultant.

He attended Cheltenham High School in Pennsylvania and received a B.A. in communications from Columbian College of Arts and Sciences at George Washington University in 1991.

== Career ==
He worked in the mailroom of InterTalent Agency in 1991, later joining International Creative Management (ICM), where he became an agent, working with Ari Emanuel and Rick Rosen, who later cofounded Endeavor Talent Agency. Weitz joined Endeavor in 1997, becoming a partner in April 2002, while heading the agency's TV packaging department.

He continued as a partner following the company's 2009 merger and transition to William Morris Endeavor, while co-leading the agency's scripted television department. Personal interests also led Weitz to add representation of celebrities crossing over from music or sports into entertainment and media.

In 2014, he received the Bernie Brillstein Legacy award, presented by Rob Lowe, a longtime client. The Hollywood Reporter named him among the "Most Powerful People in Comedy" in 2018 and 2019.

In 2022, he and fellow WME veteran Christian Muirhead became co-chairmen, and Weitz continued to represent a roster of talent, while navigating changes to the industry, including in streaming services and AI.

In early 2025, Endeavor investor Silver Lake took the publicly-traded company private again, with assets to operate under WME Group. Weitz and Muirhead were named co-chairmen of the WME Group of entertainment companies, working with president and managing partner Mark Shapiro to lead the newly formed parent company, with cofounder Emanuel serving as executive chairman.

Weitz is a board member of the Cedars-Sinai Medical Center, and Saban Community Clinic, and a trustee of McCallum Theatre.

== Quarantunes fundraisers ==
During the COVID-19 pandemic, Weitz and his daughter, Demi, began a private, online Zoom gathering, with Demi soon adding a GoFundMe campaign for the Saban Community Clinic. Fundraising concerts evolved into "Quarantunes", a series of online celebrity concerts hosted by Weitz and Demi, which raised over $37 million for various charitable causes over two years. By May 2020, over 100 performers had agreed to join the series, and The Hollywood Bowl, which had been closed for the pandemic, opened for a special concert broadcast live. Weitz engaged with his talent contacts while Demi managed nonprofit Q&As.

Bob Iger presented Weitz and Demi with the Walt Disney Philanthropists of the Year Award at the Big Brothers Big Sisters of Greater Los Angeles "The Big Night In" virtual gala, in September 2020. Other recognition includes being named among "36 Breakout Stars of 2020" by The Hollywood Reporter; presented with a Make-A-Wish Award by Mark Hamill, in December 2021; and receiving the Dorothy Parker Ally Award during the 2022 NAACP Image Awards, in February 2023.

== Personal life ==
Married to Candie, Weitz has two children, Demi and Aiden, and resides in Los Angeles.

During the 2019 Writers Guild strike, while members were leaving agencies that refused to sign a new agreement, The Hollywood Reporter published a humorous essay by writer Joel Stein about firing his long-time agent, Weitz, which was followed, in 2021, by a second Stein piece about rehiring Weitz.
