= Andrew Weitz =

Andrew Weitz is an American fashion stylist. He previously worked as a talent agent at William Morris Endeavor.

== Career ==
Weitz is originally from Philadelphia, Pennsylvania. He majored in communications at George Washington University and then moved to Los Angeles, where his brother, Richard Weitz, was working as a talent agent at ICM. Weitz joined ICM and when Richard left to work at Endeavor, Weitz joined him. As an agent, Weitz represented a number of British actors and comedians, including Ricky Gervais, James Corden, Stephen Merchant, Claire Foy and Russell Tovey. As a talent agent, he was named one of the best-dressed agents in the film business by The Hollywood Reporter and named as one of the Top 50 Best Dressed Men in the World by British GQ.

In 2014, Weitz left WME to work as a style consultant with high-net-worth individuals, founding the company The Weitz Effect. It offers a comprehensive lifestyle service, including wardrobe curation, personal shopping, and traveling advice. Weitz finds that men tend to be inspired by a specific item rather than an entire look. His clients, who are mostly male, include Elon Musk, Ari Emanuel, and Tom Brady. Weitz was named The Power Stylist, 2021 by The Hollywood Reporter. Weitz dressed Tom Brady in a lightweight Harrington jacket by Tom Ford for his arrival at the 2021 Super Bowl that became a best seller.

Weitz is a member of the British Fashion Council and the Mr Porter Style Council. He is also the contributing men’s style editor for The Hollywood Reporter.

Weitz gives fashion advice on Today and to publications such as the Robb Report and the Wall Street Journal.

== Personal life ==
He is married to Stacy, a senior executive at Sony Pictures Television. He lives in Los Angeles with his wife and their twin sons.
