= List of Major League Baseball retired numbers =

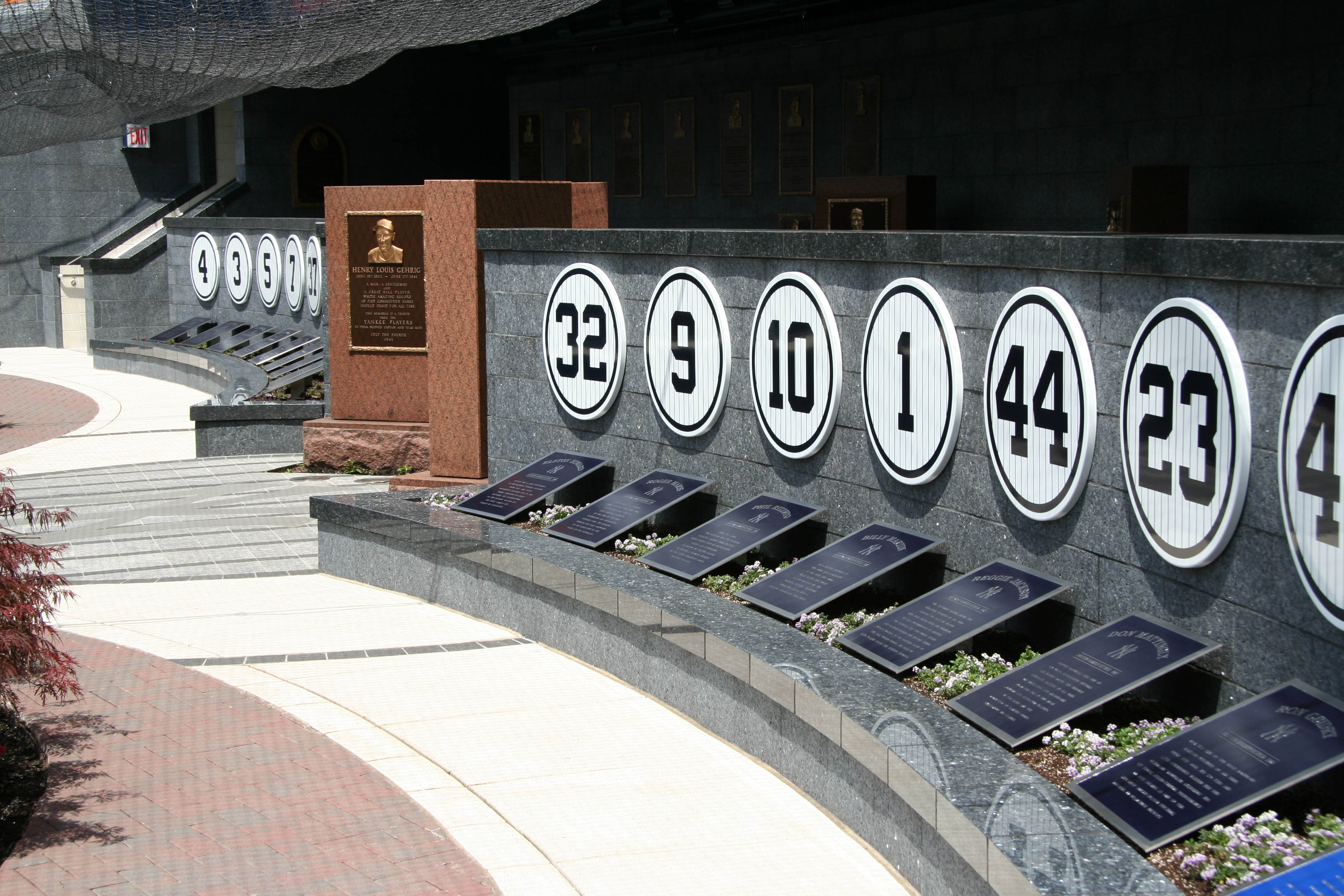
Plaques of numbers retired by the New York Yankees in Monument Park at Yankee Stadium

Major League Baseball (MLB) and its participating clubs have retired various uniform numbers over the course of time, ensuring that those numbers are never worn again and thus will always be associated with particular players or managers of note. The use of numbers on uniforms to better identify one player from another, and hence to boost sales of scorecards, was tried briefly by the Cleveland Indians of 1916, but this failed. The first team to permanently adopt the practice was the New York Yankees of 1929. By 1932, all 16 major league clubs were issuing numbers, and by 1937, the leagues passed rules requiring it.

The Yankees' original approach was to simply assign the numbers 1 through 8 to the regular starting lineup in their normal batting order. Hence, Babe Ruth wore number 3 and Lou Gehrig number 4. The first major leaguer whose number was retired was Gehrig, in July 1939, following his retirement due to amyotrophic lateral sclerosis, which became popularly known in the United States as Lou Gehrig's Disease.

Since then, over 150 other people have had their numbers retired, some with more than one team. This includes managers and coaches, as MLB is the only one of the major North American professional leagues in which the coaching staff wear the same uniforms as players. Three numbers have been retired in honor of people not directly involved on the playing field – all three for team executives. Some of the game's early stars, such as Ty Cobb and Christy Mathewson, retired before numbers came into usage. Teams often celebrate their retired numbers and other honored people by hanging banners with the numbers and names. Early stars, as well as honored non-players, will often have numberless banners hanging along with the retired numbers. Because fewer and fewer players stay with one team long enough to warrant their number being retired, some players believe that getting their number retired is a greater honor than going into the Baseball Hall of Fame. Ron Santo, upon his number 10 being retired by the Chicago Cubs on the last day of the 2003 regular season, enthusiastically told the Wrigley Field crowd as his #10 flag was hoisted, "This is my Hall of Fame!" Santo would be inducted into the Hall of Fame in July 2012, nearly two years after his death, after being voted in by the Veterans Committee.

== List of all-time retired numbers ==
Elected to the Baseball Hall of Fame
Ford C. Frick Award winner
Honored as a broadcaster for the franchise
Number retired league-wide
Never played, managed, or coached for that particular franchise
Number retired by a team for multiple players

No.	Player or other figure	Team	Date
1	Richie Ashburn	Phillies	August 24, 1979
1	Bobby Doerr	Red Sox	May 21, 1988
1	Fred Hutchinson	Reds	October 19, 1964
1	Billy Martin	Yankees	August 10, 1986
1	Billy Meyer	Pirates	1954
1	Pee Wee Reese	Dodgers	July 1, 1984
1	Bud Selig (Note: Team founder and former MLB Commissioner. Number selected symbolically.)	Brewers	April 6, 2015
1	Ozzie Smith	Cardinals	September 26, 1996
1	Lou Whitaker	Tigers	August 6, 2022
2	Nellie Fox	White Sox	May 1, 1976
2	Charlie Gehringer	Tigers	June 12, 1983
2	Derek Jeter	Yankees	May 14, 2017
2	Tommy Lasorda	Dodgers	August 15, 1997
2	Red Schoendienst	Cardinals	May 11, 1996
3	Earl Averill	Guardians	June 8, 1975
3	Harold Baines	White Sox	August 20, 1989
3	Harmon Killebrew	Twins	May 4, 1975
3	Evan Longoria	Rays	July 12, 2026
3	Dale Murphy	Braves	June 13, 1994
3	Babe Ruth	Yankees	June 13, 1948
3	Bill Terry	Giants	April 5, 1983
3	Alan Trammell	Tigers	August 26, 2018
4	Luke Appling	White Sox	June 7, 1975
4	Joe Cronin	Red Sox	May 30, 1984
4	Lou Gehrig	Yankees	July 4, 1939
4	Ralph Kiner	Pirates	September 19, 1987
4	Paul Molitor	Brewers	June 11, 1999
4	Mel Ott	Giants	July 17, 1948
4	Duke Snider	Dodgers	July 6, 1980
4	Earl Weaver	Orioles	September 19, 1982
5	Jeff Bagwell	Astros	August 26, 2007
5	Johnny Bench	Reds	August 11, 1984
5	Lou Boudreau	Guardians	July 9, 1970
5	George Brett	Royals	May 14, 1994
5	Joe DiMaggio	Yankees	April 18, 1952
5	Hank Greenberg	Tigers	June 12, 1983
5	Brooks Robinson	Orioles	April 14, 1978
5	David Wright	Mets	July 19, 2025
6	Bobby Cox	Braves	August 12, 2011
6	Steve Garvey	Padres	April 16, 1988
6	Al Kaline	Tigers	August 17, 1980
6	Stan Musial	Cardinals	September 29, 1963
6	Tony Oliva	Twins	July 14, 1991
6	Johnny Pesky	Red Sox	September 28, 2008
6	Joe Torre	Yankees	August 23, 2014
7	Craig Biggio	Astros	August 17, 2008
7	Mickey Mantle	Yankees	June 8, 1969
7	Joe Mauer	Twins	June 15, 2019
7	Iván Rodríguez	Rangers	August 12, 2017
8	Joe Morgan	Reds	June 6, 1998
8	Willie Stargell	Pirates	September 6, 1982
8	Yogi Berra	Yankees	July 22, 1972
8	Bill Dickey	Yankees	July 22, 1972
8	Cal Ripken Jr.	Orioles	October 6, 2001
8	Carl Yastrzemski	Red Sox	August 6, 1989
9	Reggie Jackson	Athletics	May 22, 2004
9	Roger Maris	Yankees	July 21, 1984
9	Bill Mazeroski	Pirates	August 7, 1987
9	Minnie Miñoso	White Sox	May 8, 1983
9	Enos Slaughter	Cardinals	September 6, 1996
9	Ted Williams	Red Sox	September 1960
10	Sparky Anderson	Reds	May 28, 2005
10	Dick Howser	Royals	July 3, 1987
10	Chipper Jones	Braves	June 28, 2013
10	Tom Kelly	Twins	September 8, 2012
10	Tony La Russa	Cardinals	May 11, 2012
10	Jim Leyland	Tigers	August 3, 2024
10	Phil Rizzuto	Yankees	August 4, 1985
10	Ron Santo	Cubs	September 28, 2003
10	Michael Young	Rangers	August 31, 2019
11	Sparky Anderson	Tigers	June 26, 2011
11	Luis Aparicio (Note: Aparicio's number was temporarily unretired with his approval for fellow Venezuelan shortstop Omar Vizquel. Vizquel played the 2010 and 2011 seasons with the White Sox.)	White Sox	August 14, 1984
11	Jim Fregosi	Angels	August 1, 1998
11	Carl Hubbell	Giants	1944
11	Barry Larkin	Reds	August 25, 2012
11	Edgar Martínez	Mariners	August 12, 2017
11	Paul Waner	Pirates	July 21, 2007
11	Ryan Zimmerman	Nationals	June 18, 2022
12	Wade Boggs	Rays	April 7, 2000
13	Dave Concepción	Reds	August 25, 2007
13	Billy Wagner	Astros	August 16, 2025
13	Ozzie Guillen	White Sox	August 8, 2026
14	Ernie Banks	Cubs	August 22, 1982
14	Ken Boyer	Cardinals	May 20, 1984
14	Jim Bunning	Phillies	April 16, 2001
14	Larry Doby	Guardians	July 3, 1994
14	Gil Hodges	Mets	June 9, 1973
14	Gil Hodges	Dodgers	June 4, 2022
14	Kent Hrbek	Twins	August 13, 1995
14	Paul Konerko	White Sox	May 23, 2015
14	Jim Rice	Red Sox	July 28, 2009
14	Pete Rose	Reds	June 26, 2016
15	Dick Allen	Phillies	September 3, 2020
15	Thurman Munson	Yankees	August 3, 1979
15	Carlos Beltrán	Mets	September 19, 2026
16	Whitey Ford	Yankees	August 3, 1974
16	Dwight Gooden	Mets	April 14, 2024
16	Ted Lyons	White Sox	July 25, 1987
16	Hal Newhouser	Tigers	July 27, 1997
17	Dizzy Dean	Cardinals	September 22, 1974
17	Todd Helton	Rockies	August 17, 2014
17	Keith Hernandez	Mets	July 9, 2022
18	Mel Harder	Guardians	July 28, 1990
18	Ted Kluszewski	Reds	July 18, 1998
18	Darryl Strawberry	Mets	June 1, 2024
19	Bob Feller	Guardians	December 28, 1956
19	Jim Gilliam	Dodgers	October 10, 1978
19	Tony Gwynn	Padres	September 4, 2004
19	Billy Pierce	White Sox	July 25, 1987
19	Robin Yount	Brewers	May 29, 1994
20	Lou Brock	Cardinals	September 9, 1979
20	Luis Gonzalez	Diamondbacks	August 7, 2010
20	Monte Irvin	Giants	June 26, 2010
20	Jorge Posada	Yankees	August 22, 2015
20	Frank Robinson	Orioles	March 10, 1972
20	Frank Robinson	Reds	May 22, 1998
20	Frank Robinson	Guardians	May 27, 2017
20	Mike Schmidt	Phillies	May 26, 1990
20	Don Sutton	Dodgers	August 14, 1998
20	Pie Traynor	Pirates	April 18, 1972
20	Frank White	Royals	July 2, 1995
21	Roberto Clemente	Pirates	April 6, 1973
21	Jeff Kent	Giants	August 29, 2026
21	Bob Lemon	Guardians	June 20, 1998
21	Paul O'Neill	Yankees	August 21, 2022
21	Warren Spahn	Braves	December 11, 1965
22	Will Clark	Giants	July 30, 2022
22	Jim Palmer	Orioles	September 1, 1985
23	Willie Horton	Tigers	July 15, 2000
23	Don Mattingly	Yankees	August 31, 1997
23	Ryne Sandberg	Cubs	August 28, 2005
23	Ted Simmons	Cardinals	July 31, 2021
24	Walter Alston	Dodgers	June 5, 1977
24	Ken Griffey Jr.	Mariners	August 6, 2016 (Note: Date of formal ceremony; number retirement took effect at the start of the 2016 MLB season. The number was also retired for all Mariners minor league affiliates at that time.)
24	Rickey Henderson	Athletics	August 1, 2009
24	Whitey Herzog	Cardinals	July 31, 2010
24	Willie Mays	Giants	May 12, 1972
24	Willie Mays	Mets	August 27, 2022
24	Tony Pérez	Reds	May 27, 2000
24	Jimmy Wynn	Astros	June 25, 2005
25	Barry Bonds	Giants	August 11, 2018
25	José Cruz	Astros	October 3, 1992
25	Andruw Jones	Braves	September 9, 2023
25	Jim Thome	Guardians	August 18, 2018
26	Gene Autry (Note: Team founder. The number represents the "26th man"—At the time of the number's retirement, Major League Baseball rosters were limited to 25 players prior September 1, when rosters expanded to 40.)	Angels	August 3, 1982
26	Wade Boggs	Red Sox	May 26, 2016
26	Johnny Oates	Rangers	August 5, 2005
26	Billy Williams	Cubs	August 13, 1987
27	Carlton Fisk	Red Sox	September 4, 2000
27	Catfish Hunter	Athletics	June 9, 1991
27	Juan Marichal	Giants	July 10, 1983
28	Bert Blyleven	Twins	July 16, 2011
29	Adrián Beltré	Rangers	June 8, 2019
29	Rod Carew	Twins	July 19, 1987
29	Rod Carew	Angels	August 6, 1991
29	John Smoltz	Braves	June 8, 2012
30	Orlando Cepeda	Giants	July 11, 1999
30	Nolan Ryan	Angels	June 16, 1992
31	Ferguson Jenkins	Cubs	May 3, 2009
31	Greg Maddux	Cubs	May 3, 2009
31	Greg Maddux	Braves	July 17, 2009
31	Mike Piazza	Mets	July 30, 2016
31	Dave Winfield	Padres	April 14, 2001
32	Steve Carlton	Phillies	July 29, 1989
32	Roy Halladay	Blue Jays	March 29, 2018
32	Elston Howard	Yankees	July 21, 1984
32	Sandy Koufax	Dodgers	June 4, 1972
32	Jim Umbricht	Astros	April 12, 1965
33	Eddie Murray	Orioles	June 7, 1998
33	Mike Scott	Astros	October 3, 1992
33	Honus Wagner	Pirates	February 16, 1952
33	Larry Walker	Rockies	September 25, 2021
34	Rollie Fingers	Brewers	August 9, 1992
34	Rollie Fingers	Athletics	July 5, 1993
34	Roy Halladay	Phillies	August 8, 2021
34	David Ortiz	Red Sox	June 23, 2017
34	Kirby Puckett	Twins	May 25, 1997
34	Nolan Ryan	Rangers	September 15, 1996
34	Nolan Ryan	Astros	September 29, 1996
34	Dave Stewart	Athletics	September 11, 2022
34	Fernando Valenzuela	Dodgers	August 11, 2023
35	Randy Jones	Padres	May 9, 1997
35	Phil Niekro	Braves	August 6, 1984
35	Frank Thomas	White Sox	August 29, 2010
36	Jim Kaat	Twins	July 16, 2022
36	Jerry Koosman	Mets	August 28, 2021
36	Gaylord Perry	Giants	July 23, 2005
36	Robin Roberts	Phillies	March 21, 1962
37	Casey Stengel	Mets	September 2, 1965
37	Casey Stengel	Yankees	August 8, 1970
39	Roy Campanella	Dodgers	June 4, 1972
40	Danny Murtaugh	Pirates	April 7, 1977
40	Don Wilson	Astros	April 13, 1975
41	Eddie Mathews	Braves	July 26, 1969
41	Tom Seaver	Mets	July 24, 1988
42	Mariano Rivera (Note: Number was already retired league-wide.)	Yankees	September 22, 2013
42	Jackie Robinson	Dodgers	June 4, 1972
42	Jackie Robinson	All MLB	April 15, 1997
42	Bruce Sutter	Cardinals	September 17, 2006
43	Dennis Eckersley	Athletics	August 13, 2005
44	Hank Aaron	Brewers	October 3, 1976
44	Hank Aaron	Braves	April 15, 1977
44	Reggie Jackson	Yankees	August 14, 1993
44	Willie McCovey	Giants	September 21, 1980
45	Bob Gibson	Cardinals	September 1, 1975
45	Pedro Martínez	Red Sox	July 28, 2015
46	Andy Pettitte	Yankees	August 23, 2015
47	Tom Glavine	Braves	August 6, 2010
47	Jack Morris	Tigers	August 12, 2018
49	Larry Dierker	Astros	May 19, 2002
49	Ron Guidry	Yankees	August 23, 2003
50	Jimmie Reese	Angels	August 2, 1995
51	Trevor Hoffman	Padres	August 21, 2011
51	Randy Johnson	Diamondbacks	August 8, 2015
51	Randy Johnson	Mariners	May 2, 2026
51	Ichiro Suzuki	Mariners	August 9, 2025
51	Bernie Williams	Yankees	May 24, 2015
52	CC Sabathia	Yankees	September 25, 2026
53	Don Drysdale	Dodgers	July 1, 1984
56	Mark Buehrle	White Sox	June 24, 2017
66	Don Zimmer	Rays	April 6, 2015
72	Carlton Fisk	White Sox	September 14, 1997
85	August Busch, Jr. (Note: Served as president, chairman, or CEO of the Cardinals from the team's purchase by Anheuser-Busch in 1953 until his death in 1989. The number represents his age at the time the number was retired in 1984.)	Cardinals	April 13, 1984
455	Cleveland fans (Note: Number was selected symbolically. The number 455 was retired in honor of the fans after the Cleveland Indians sold out 455 consecutive games.)	Guardians	May 29, 2001
HAAS	Walter A. Haas, Jr. (Note: Athletics owner Walter A. Haas, Jr. was honored by having his "HAAS displayed in a manner similar to a retired number.)	Athletics	1995
KSM	Keli McGregor (Note: Rockies president Keli McGregor was honored by having his initials "KSM" displayed in a manner similar to a retired number after his death.)	Rockies	September 28, 2010
NY	Christy Mathewson (Note: Christy Mathewson played in the era before uniform numbers were used. He was honored for his tenure with the then-New York Giants with the letters "NY" displayed in a manner similar to a retired number.)	Giants	August 17, 1986
NY	John McGraw (Note: John McGraw played in the era before uniform numbers were used. He was honored for his tenure with the then-New York Giants with the letters "NY" displayed in a manner similar to a retired number.)	Giants	August 17, 1986
P	Grover Cleveland Alexander (Note: Grover Cleveland Alexander only played in the era before uniform numbers were used. Alexander was honored with a Phillies letter "P" logo displayed in a manner similar to a retired number.)	Phillies	April 6, 2001
P	Chuck Klein (Note: Chuck Klein first played in the era before uniform numbers were used. He later frequently changed his number. Instead of retiring a number, Klein was honored with a Phillies letter "P" logo displayed in a manner similar to a retired number.)	Phillies	April 6, 2001
P	Ed Delahanty (Note: Ed Delahanty only played in the era before uniform numbers were used. Delahanty was honored with a Phillies letter "P" logo displayed in a manner similar to a retired number.)	Phillies	May 1, 2025
P	Billy Hamilton (Note: Billy Hamilton only played in the era before uniform numbers were used. Hamilton was honored with a Phillies letter "P" logo displayed in a manner similar to a retired number.)	Phillies	May 1, 2025
P	Sam Thompson (Note: Sam Thompson only played in the era before uniform numbers were used. Thompson was honored with a Phillies letter "P" logo displayed in a manner similar to a retired number.)	Phillies	May 1, 2025
SHEA	William Shea (Note: William Shea was the attorney who was in large part responsible for the creation of the Mets in 1961. The team's second home, Shea Stadium, was named for him. He was honored with the name "SHEA" displayed in a manner similar to a retired number.)	Mets	April 8, 2008
SL	Rogers Hornsby (Note: Rogers Hornsby played most of his career in the era before uniform numbers were used. He wore number 4 with the Cardinals late in his career. Hornsby was honored with the letters "SL" displayed in a manner similar to a retired number.)	Cardinals	1997
🎤	Bob Uecker (Note: Broadcaster Bob Uecker was honored by the Brewers with a microphone displayed in a similar manner to a retired number.)	Brewers	August 24, 2025
🎤	Jack Buck (Note: Broadcaster Jack Buck was honored by the Cardinals with a microphone displayed in a similar manner to a retired number.)	Cardinals	2002
🎤	Jaime Jarrín (Note: Broadcaster Jaime Jarrín was honored by the Dodgers with a microphone displayed in a similar manner to a retired number.)	Dodgers	September 21, 2018
🎤	Vin Scully (Note: Broadcaster Vin Scully was honored by the Dodgers with a microphone displayed in a similar manner to a retired number.)	Dodgers	May 3, 2017
🎤	Russ Hodges (Note: Broadcaster Russ Hodges was honored by the Giants with a microphone displayed in a similar manner to a retired number.)	Giants	
🎤	Jon Miller (Note: Broadcaster Jon Miller was honored by the Giants with a microphone displayed in a similar manner to a retired number.)	Giants	May 3, 2017
🎤	Lon Simmons (Note: Broadcaster Lon Simmons was honored by the Giants with a microphone displayed in a similar manner to a retired number.)	Giants	2004
🎤	Ralph Kiner (Note: Ralph Kiner was honored by the Mets as a broadcaster with a microphone displayed in a similar manner to a retired number.)	Mets	July 16, 2010
🎤	Bob Murphy (Note: Broadcaster Bob Murphy was honored by the Mets with a microphone displayed in a similar manner to a retired number.)	Mets	April 5, 2023

== List of pending number retirements ==
There are no current pending number retirements at this time. The most recent player to have his number retired was former pitcher CC Sabathia, whose number 52 was retired by the New York Yankees on September 25, 2026.

== Former retired numbers ==
It is very rare for a team to reissue a retired number and usually requires a special circumstance, such as the person for whom the number was retired returning to the team in a player, coach or manager role. Harold Baines provides one example of this when he returned to the White Sox multiple times. The White Sox also re-issued Luis Aparicio's number 11, with his permission, to fellow countryman Omar Vizquel in 2010–11.

In cases of franchise relocation, the handling of existing retired numbers is at the discretion of team management. The team may decide to continue honoring the retired numbers (as did the San Francisco Giants), or it may choose to make a "fresh start" and reissue the numbers (as the Washington Nationals have done).

The Cincinnati Reds returned Willard Hershberger's number 5 to circulation two years after his death. Cincinnati later re-retired the number to honor Johnny Bench.

When the Florida Marlins moved to their current stadium, LoanDepot Park, and were rebranded as the Miami Marlins, the number 5, which had been retired for the team's late first president Carl Barger, was returned to circulation because player Logan Morrison requested permission to wear the number to honor his father.

No.	Player or other figure	Team	Date
5	Carl Barger (Note: Placed into circulation in 2012 when the Marlins moved to their new park and decided to honor Barger instead with a plaque at the stadium. The first player to receive the number was Logan Morrison. Barger was the team's first president but died in December 1992, four months before the team's first game. The Marlins chose to retire #5 because it was the number worn by Barger's favorite player, Joe DiMaggio.)	Marlins	April 5, 1993
5	Willard Hershberger (Note: The Reds retired Hershberger's #5 after his death in 1940 but returned it to circulation two years later. Cincinnati later re-retired the number 5 for Johnny Bench.)	Reds	1940
8	Gary Carter (Note: The Montreal Expos retired numbers in honor of four players (Carter #8, Dawson #10, Staub #10, Raines #30). When the franchise relocated to Washington, D.C., after the 2004 season, the newly christened Washington Nationals chose not to recognize any uniform number retired while in Montreal. On October 18, 2005, the NHL's Montreal Canadiens honored the departed team by raising an Expos commemorative banner listing the retired numbers to the rafters of Montreal's Bell Centre.)	Expos	July 31, 1993
10	Andre Dawson	Expos	July 6, 1997
10	Rusty Staub	Expos	May 15, 1993
12	Roberto Alomar (Note: The Toronto Blue Jays retired Alomar’s #12 on July 31, 2011. However, on April 30, 2021 in light of an investigation of Alomar being in violation of MLB policy after being alleged to have engaged in sexual misconduct in 2014, the Blue Jays removed Alomar's banner and cut ties with him. The number was used again for the first time on July 31, 2023, when Jordan Hicks claimed the number after being traded to the team.)	Blue Jays	July 31, 2011
30	Tim Raines	Expos	June 19, 2004

== Retired in honor of multiple players ==
The following numbers have been retired in honor of multiple players:

- Chicago Cubs, #31: retired in 2009 for Fergie Jenkins and Greg Maddux
- Cincinnati Reds, #5: retired in 1940 for Willard Hershberger who had died by suicide during the season; returned to service in 1942; retired in 1984 for Johnny Bench
- Montreal Expos, #10: retired for Rusty Staub in 1993; ceremony to honor #10 for Andre Dawson was held in 1997
- New York Yankees, #8: retired in 1972 for Bill Dickey and Yogi Berra
- St. Louis Cardinals, #42: retired in 1997 by all teams in MLB for Jackie Robinson; ceremony to honor #42 for Bruce Sutter was held in 2006
- New York Yankees, #42: retired in 1997 by all teams in MLB for Jackie Robinson (players already wearing the number could continue to do so by special arrangement); ceremony to honor #42 for Mariano Rivera was held in 2013
- Oakland Athletics, #34: retired for Rollie Fingers in 1993; ceremony to honor #34 for Dave Stewart was held in 2022.
- Seattle Mariners #51: retired for Ichiro Suzuki in 2025; ceremony to honor #51 for Randy Johnson was held in 2026.

== Retired by multiple teams ==
A handful of players who had notable careers for multiple teams have had their numbers retired by each team.

- Frank Robinson's #20 was retired by the Reds, Orioles and the then-Indians.
- Rod Carew's #29 was retired by the Twins and Angels.
- Hank Aaron's #44 was retired by the Braves and Brewers.
- Reggie Jackson had his #9 retired by the Athletics, and his #44 retired by the Yankees.
- Rollie Fingers' #34 was retired by the Athletics and Brewers.
- Carlton Fisk had his #27 retired by the Red Sox, and his #72 retired by the White Sox.
- Greg Maddux's #31 was retired by the Cubs and Braves.
- Nolan Ryan had his #30 retired by the Angels, while his #34 is retired by the Astros and Rangers.
- Wade Boggs's #12 was retired by the then-Devil Rays, and his #26 is retired by the Red Sox.
- Roy Halladay's #32 was retired by the Blue Jays, and his #34 is retired by the Phillies.
- Jackie Robinson’s #42 has been retired by every team in MLB, due to him breaking the color barrier in baseball.
- Gil Hodges' #14 was retired by the Mets and Dodgers.
- Willie Mays' #24 was retired by the Giants and Mets.
- Randy Johnson's #51 has been retired by the Diamondbacks and Mariners.

Excluding Jackie Robinson, only Frank Robinson and Nolan Ryan have had their number(s) retired by three teams. Managers Casey Stengel and Sparky Anderson have also had numbers retired by two teams. Stengel's #37 was retired by the Yankees and Mets. Anderson's #10 was retired by the Reds, and his #11 was retired by the Tigers.

== Alternative methods of recognition ==
A number of teams have formal or informal policies of only retiring numbers of players inducted into the Baseball Hall of Fame, although there is no league-wide uniformity and teams sometimes break their own guidelines. As an alternative to retiring numbers, many teams have established other means of honoring former players, such as team-specific halls of fame (Angels, Astros, Athletics, Braves, Brewers, Cardinals, Guardians, Mariners, Mets, Orioles, Padres, Rangers, Reds, Red Sox, and Twins) walls of fame (Giants and Phillies), a Ring of Honor (Nationals), or Level of Excellence (Blue Jays). In addition, several teams have kept certain numbers out of circulation since a player left but have not formally retired them. The Rangers introduced another means of honoring former players while preparing to open their current home of Globe Life Field in 2020. In December 2019, a few months before the park's opening, the team announced that all of its retired numbers would be incorporated into the park's posted dimensions.

The Montreal Expos franchise retired jerseys in honor of four players but returned the numbers to use upon moving to Washington, D.C., to begin play as the Washington Nationals in 2005, becoming the only MLB team with no retired numbers other than Jackie Robinson's No. 42. In 2010, the Nationals established a "Ring of Honor" which, as of 2026, includes three of those Expos players (Gary Carter, Andre Dawson, and Tim Raines), along with the Expos' last and Nationals' first manager, Frank Robinson; Nationals players Iván Rodríguez, Jayson Werth, and Ryan Zimmerman; original Washington Senators (1901–1960) players Joe Cronin, Rick Ferrell, Goose Goslin, Bucky Harris, Walter Johnson, Heinie Manush, Sam Rice, Harmon Killebrew, and Early Wynn, as well as owner Clark Griffith; expansion Washington Senators (1961–1971) player Frank Howard; and Homestead Grays players Cool Papa Bell, Ray Brown, Josh Gibson, Buck Leonard, Cumberland Posey, and Jud Wilson. The Nationals retired their first number, Zimmerman's No. 11, in 2022.

The Miami Marlins had previously retired #5 in honor of their first team president, the late Carl Barger, but returned it to use entering the 2012 season when they relocated to the venue now known as LoanDepot Park. As of 2026, they are the only franchise with no retired numbers, aside from Robinson's #42.

In August 2024, the Minnesota Twins retired the letter W as a tribute to their origin as the Washington Senators during the 100-year anniversary of the Senators' World Series-winning team.

=== Numbers kept out of circulation ===
Some teams have not formally retired certain numbers but nonetheless kept them out of circulation. For example, the Los Angeles Dodgers' current policy is only to retire the numbers of longtime club members if they are inducted into the Hall of Fame; the lone exception was longtime Dodger player and coach Jim Gilliam, whose #19 was retired when he died of a cerebral hemorrhage during the Dodgers' 1978 postseason run. Nevertheless, the Dodgers informally kept Fernando Valenzuela's #34 out of circulation since he last played for the team in 1990. In 2023, the Dodgers retired his number. The Dodgers have not issued Don Newcombe's #36 since his death in 2019. The Dodgers have also not issued Justin Turner's #10 since his departure following the 2022 season, as well as Clayton Kershaw's #22 after his 2025 retirement.

The Arizona Diamondbacks have not issued Paul Goldschmidt's #44 since they traded him in 2018.

The Atlanta Braves have not re-issued Freddie Freeman's #5 since leaving the team after 2021.

The Baltimore Orioles have not re-issued numbers 7, 44, and 46 since the deaths of Cal Ripken Sr., Elrod Hendricks, and Mike Flanagan, respectively. The team placed a moratorium on the three numbers in their honors. However, in 2024, Craig Kimbrel became the first Oriole to wear 46 since Flanagan's death in 2011, and Jackson Holliday was given permission by the Ripken family to wear #7 ahead of his major league debut in April. Additionally, the Orioles have not issued number 10 since outfielder Adam Jones' final game with the club in 2018.

The Boston Red Sox have not re-issued uniform numbers 15 (Dustin Pedroia), 21 (Roger Clemens), 33 (Jason Varitek) and 49 (Tim Wakefield) since those players left the Red Sox or ended their careers. Varitek later reclaimed #33 upon joining the Red Sox coaching staff in 2021 until his departure in early 2026. The Red Sox have also not issued #24 since David Price switched his number from #24 to #10 prior to the 2019 season, with Price saying that he wanted to switch out of respect for Dwight Evans, who spent 18 years with the Red Sox, and is a member of the team's Hall of Fame.

The Chicago Cubs have not issued Anthony Rizzo's #44 since they traded him in 2021. The Cubs have also not issued Kerry Wood's #34 since his retirement in 2012, except for Jon Lester when he joined the team in 2015. Lester's previous uniform number of #31 was already retired by the Cubs, and so after receiving Wood's blessing, Lester wore #34 from 2015 to 2020. Additionally, following their reconciliation in 2024, the Cubs have also taken Sammy Sosa's #21 out of circulation.

The Chicago White Sox have not issued hitting coach Charley Lau's #6 since his death in 1984, except to Lau disciple Walt Hriniak, who was the White Sox hitting coach from 1989-1995. The White Sox have also not issued Ozzie Guillén's #13 since leaving as the team's manager in 2011, with the team announcing that they will retire Guillen's number on August 8, 2026.

The Cincinnati Reds took Joey Votto's #19 out of circulation after he left the team in 2023.

The Colorado Rockies have not re-issued Carlos Gonzalez's #5 since he left the team after 2018, or Nolan Arenado's #28 since his trade from the team in 2021.

The Detroit Tigers did not re-issue Justin Verlander's #35 since they traded him in 2017 until his return in 2026. The Tigers also took Miguel Cabrera's #24 out of circulation following his 2023 retirement.

The Houston Astros have also kept #35 out of circulation since Verlander's departure in 2024. They also removed #17 out of circulation after the departure of Lance Berkman in 2010.

The Kansas City Royals have not issued Ned Yost's #3 since his retirement in 2019, or Alex Gordon's #4 since his retirement in 2020. The #29, worn by Dan Quisenberry, who died in 1998, has not been issued since Mike Sweeney, who wore the number beginning in 1995, left the team in 2007. The Royals have also not issued Yordano Ventura's #30 since 2021, when Danny Duffy switched to the number to honor his former teammate, who passed away in 2017.

The Los Angeles Angels have not re-issued Nick Adenhart's #34, after he was killed in a car accident on April 9, 2009, except for Noah Syndergaard, who requested and received the number when he joined the team in 2022. He stated that he wanted to wear his old Mets’ number as a tribute to Adenhart. The Angels did not re-issue Tim Salmon's #15 following his retirement in 2006 until 2023. The team has withheld Tyler Skaggs' #45 since he died in July 2019. For the remainder of the 2019 season, they put 45 on the mound instead of an advertisement.

The Miami Marlins have not issued José Fernández’s #16 since his death in September 2016.

The Milwaukee Brewers have not issued Jim Gantner’s #17 or Ryan Braun's #8 since their retirements.

On Opening Day of the 2012 season, the New York Mets unveiled a memorial "Kid 8" logo to honor the late Gary Carter. In 2026, Nick Morabito became the first Met to wear #8 since Carter's election to the Hall of Fame in 2003. However, the number was issued in error, with Morabito switching to #55 the following day. The Mets have also not issued #48 since the departure of Jacob deGrom.

The Philadelphia Phillies are keeping four numbers out of circulation: Chase Utley's #26, Jimmy Rollins' #11, and Ryan Howard's #6 and Cole Hamels' #35.

The Pittsburgh Pirates have not issued manager Chuck Tanner's #7 since the 2013 season, except for Isiah Kiner-Falefa when he joined the team in 2024. Through his mother's lineage, Kiner-Falefa is the second cousin twice removed of Baseball Hall of Famer Ralph Kiner, whose #4 is retired by the Pirates.

The San Francisco Giants are currently keeping four numbers out of circulation: Tim Lincecum's #55, Buster Posey's #28, Madison Bumgarner's #40, and former manager Bruce Bochy's #15. Additionally, Justin Verlander is the only player to wear #35 for the Giants following Brandon Crawford's departure after the 2023 season. However, Verlander did so after receiving Crawford's blessing, and following Verlander's departure, the number has once again been removed from circulation.

The Seattle Mariners have kept Jay Buhner's #19 out of circulation since his retirement in 2001, Félix Hernández's #34 since his retirement in 2019, and Kyle Seager's #15 since his retirement in 2021. Manager Lou Piniella's #14 has not been worn by a player since he left the team in 2002.

The St. Louis Cardinals did not reissue Albert Pujols's #5 from his first departure after the 2011 season until his return to the team in 2022. Since both his and Yadier Molina's retirements at the end of that season, the Cardinals have again kept the number out of circulation. Adam Wainwright's #50 was also taken out of circulation after his 2023 retirement. Fan favorite Willie McGee has not had his #51 issued since he retired in 1999, except for when Bud Smith briefly wore the number in 2001.

The Toronto Blue Jays have not issued José Bautista's #19 since his departure from the team in 2017, except in 2019 when Alen Hanson briefly wore the number.

The Washington Nationals have not issued Max Scherzer's #31 since his trade from the team in 2021, or Stephen Strasburg's #37 since his final appearance in 2022.

After Darryl Kile's death in 2002, the teams he played for (Colorado Rockies, Houston Astros, and St. Louis Cardinals) took his #57 out of circulation. The Cardinals first re-issued the number in 2021 spring training to pitcher Zack Thompson, who would go on to make his major league debut the following season wearing the number. The Rockies then re-issued the number in 2023 to pitcher Tommy Doyle. The Astros have still not re-issued #57 following Kile's passing.

== Number retired by Major League Baseball ==
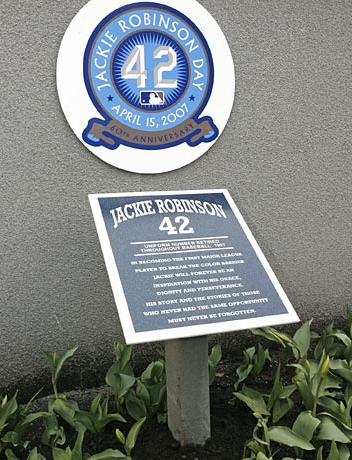
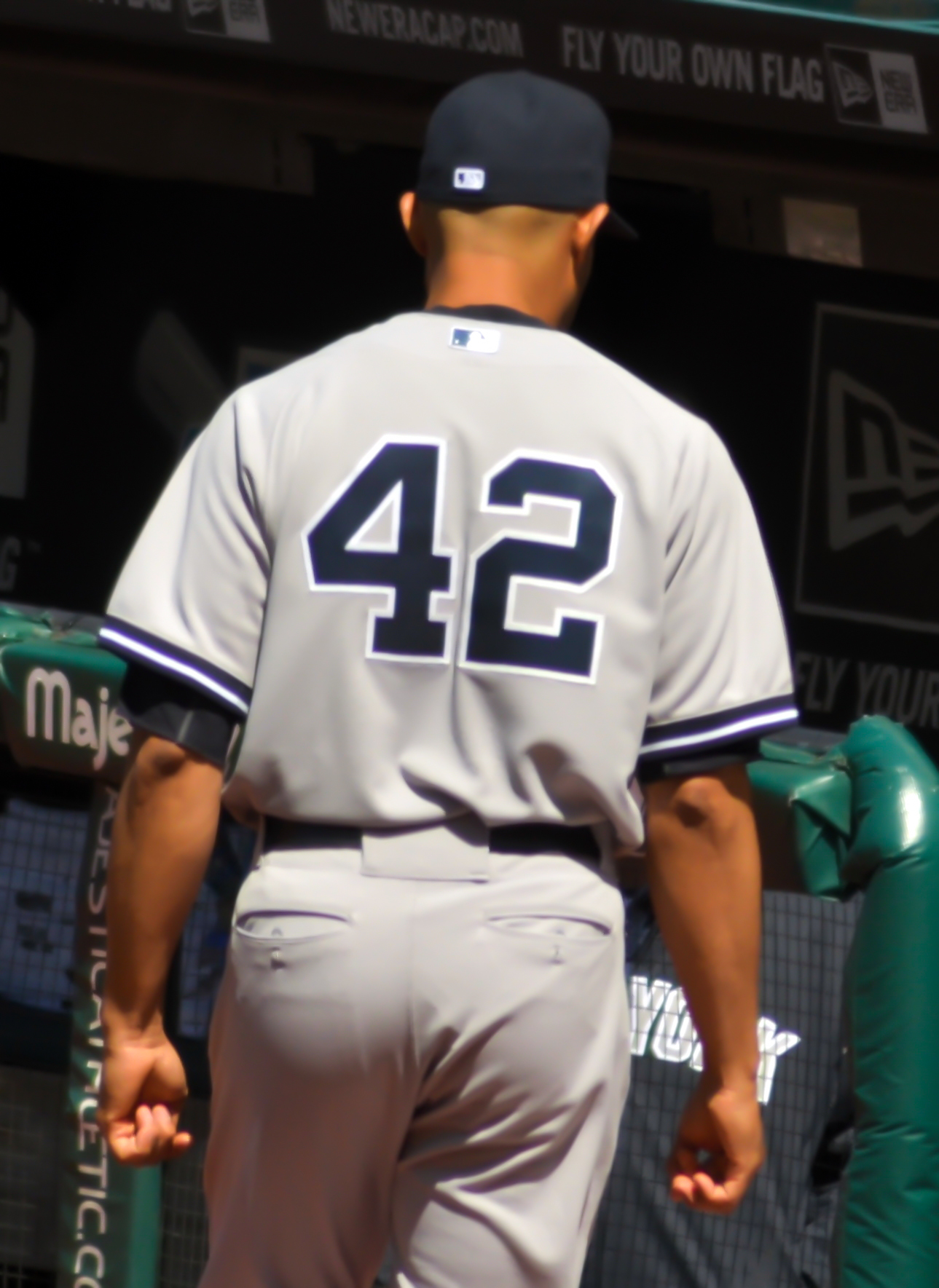
(Left): The number 42 worn by Robinson on a plaque at Monument Park; (right): Mariano Rivera was the last player to wear the 42 on his shirt

Normally the individual clubs are responsible for retiring numbers. On April 15, 1997, MLB took the unusual move of retiring a number for all teams. On the 50th anniversary of Jackie Robinson breaking the baseball color line, his number 42 was retired throughout the majors, at the order of Commissioner Bud Selig. This meant that no future player on any major league team could wear number 42, although players wearing #42 at the time were allowed to continue wearing it (Mariano Rivera was the last active player to be grandfathered in, retiring after the 2013 season).

Starting in the 2007 season, the 60th anniversary of Robinson's MLB debut, players and coaches have all worn the number 42 as a tribute to Robinson on Jackie Robinson Day, April 15.

There is a lobby to have uniform #21 retired in all of baseball to honor Roberto Clemente.

== Similar honors ==
=== Players who pre-date uniform numbers ===
Four teams have honored players who played before the advent of uniform numbers by placing their names among those of players whose numbers have been retired:

- Philadelphia Phillies: Grover Cleveland Alexander, Chuck Klein, Ed Delahanty, Billy Hamilton, Sam Thompson; all are denoted with a stylized "P" at Citizens Bank Park (Klein had various numbers in the later years of his career, but never wore one consistently)
- Detroit Tigers: Ty Cobb, Mickey Cochrane, Sam Crawford, Harry Heilmann, Hughie Jennings, George Kell, Heinie Manush; Cobb's name is displayed on the left-field wall of Comerica Park along with the players whose numbers have been retired; the others have their names displayed on the right-field wall (Cochrane actually wore #3 for the Tigers, and Kell wore three different numbers, but the Tigers have not retired these numbers), along with former manager Sparky Anderson. The Tigers eventually retired #3, but that was for Alan Trammell, not Cochrane.
- San Francisco (New York) Giants: Christy Mathewson and John McGraw; both are denoted with "NY" and their names at Oracle Park
- St. Louis Cardinals: Rogers Hornsby, denoted with an "SL" and his name at Busch Stadium, though he wore several numbers with the Cardinals and other teams.

=== Broadcasters ===
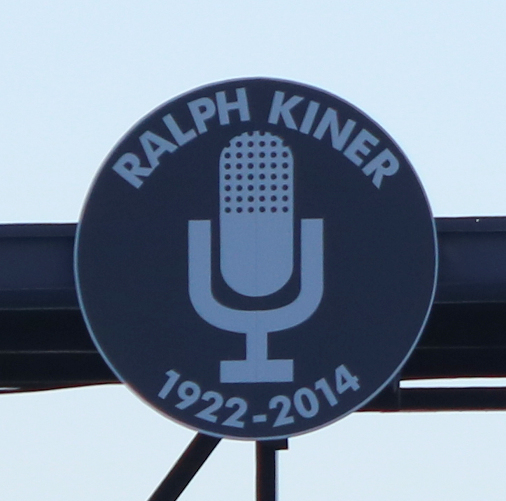
The Ralph Kiner memorial logo (black), found adjacent to the New York Mets' retired numbers at Citi Field, 2018

- Bob Murphy and Ralph Kiner – New York Mets; The radio booth at both Shea Stadium and Citi Field are named for Murphy. The television booth at Citi Field is named for Kiner, who continued to broadcast some home games for the Mets until his death in early 2014. In addition, a special memorial logo honoring Kiner, depicting a microphone along with his name and the years 1922–2014, was displayed at Citi Field on the left field wall adjacent to, but not as a part of, the Mets' retired numbers, from 2014 to 2016. In the 2016 Mets yearbook, a sidebar in an article on Mike Piazza's upcoming number retirement implies that Kiner has been "retired" a la William A. Shea. This was reinforced when the Mets' retired numbers were moved to the roof facade during the 2016 season to accommodate Mike Piazza's #31; Kiner's "number" was placed adjacent to the Shea and Jackie Robinson numbers, no longer separated from the others.
- Jack Buck – St. Louis Cardinals; honored with a drawing of a microphone on the wall with the retired numbers.
- Lon Simmons, Russ Hodges, and Jon Miller – San Francisco Giants; honored with stylized old-style radio microphone displayed in place of a number.
- Marty Brennaman, Waite Hoyt, and Joe Nuxhall – Cincinnati Reds; honored with microphones by the broadcast booth.
- Jerry Coleman – San Diego Padres; a "star on the wall" in reference to his trademark phrase "You can hang a star on that one!" The star is painted in gold on the front of the press box down the right field line, accompanied by Coleman's name in white. Upon Coleman's death in 2014, the broadcast booth at Petco Park was named in his honor.
- Harry Kalas and Richie Ashburn – Philadelphia Phillies; At Citizens Bank Park, the restaurant built into the base of the main scoreboard is named "Harry the K's" in Kalas's honor. After Kalas's death, the Phillies' TV-broadcast booth was renamed "The Harry Kalas Broadcast Booth". It is directly next to the radio-broadcast booth, which is named "The Richie 'Whitey' Ashburn Broadcast Booth". They both also have statues at Citizens Bank Park (though Ashburn is in uniform for his statue).
- Ernie Harwell – Detroit Tigers; honored with his name alongside the retired players on the Left-Centerfield Brick wall in Comerica Park and a statue & portrait at the stadium's front entrance. Honored with the Media Center named after him also.
- Bob Uecker – "50 Years in Baseball" along with Uecker's name is next to the Brewers retired numbers at American Family Field.
- Tom Cheek – Toronto Blue Jays; honored with a spot on the Rogers Centre's "Level of Excellence" bearing his name and, in place of a jersey number, 4,306 – his streak of consecutive regular-season broadcasts.
- Harry Caray and Jack Brickhouse – Chicago Cubs: Caray is remembered inside and outside of Wrigley Field. A statue of him leading the crowd in "Take Me Out to the Ballgame" is near the bleacher entrance (originally at the corner of Addison Street and Sheffield Avenue), and a caricature of him adorns his former WGN-TV broadcast booth. Brickhouse's catch phrase, "Hey hey!" is memorialized in large red letters on each foul pole. (Brickhouse also has a statue on Michigan Avenue.)
- Dave Niehaus – Seattle Mariners; the press box at T-Mobile Park was renamed the "Dave Niehaus Media Center" on April 8, 2011, prior to the Mariners' home opener against the Cleveland Indians. In addition, a part of First Avenue NW outside the stadium was renamed Dave Niehaus Way, and the wall in deep right-center field also has a microphone with a Dave Niehaus graphic. There is the Dave Niehaus Statue on the Main Concourse at Section 105.
- Vin Scully and Jaime Jarrín – Los Angeles Dodgers; in 2001, the Dodgers honored Scully by naming the press box at Dodger Stadium the "Vin Scully Press Box". However, on January 29, 2016, the Los Angeles City Council in a unanimous vote, renamed Elysian Park Avenue to Vin Scully Avenue, changing the address of Dodger Stadium to 1000 Vin Scully Ave.. In 2022, the Spanish announcers' press box at Dodger Stadium was renamed the "Jaime Jarrín Spanish Broadcast Booth" in honor of Jarrín, who retired that season.
- Arch McDonald and Bob Wolff – Washington Senators: MacDonald and Wolff's names are on the Washington Nationals' Ring of Honor at Nationals Park.
- Bill King – Oakland Athletics; the Athletics named their broadcast facilities the "Bill King Broadcast Booth" after King's death in 2005.

=== Owners and contributors ===
- The initials of the late San Diego Padres owner Ray Kroc are painted in gold on the front of the pressbox down the right field line, accompanied by his name in white.
- The initials of the late Boston Red Sox owners Tom and Jean Yawkey are rendered in Morse code and painted in white on the manual scoreboard on Fenway Park's Green Monster.
- Charles Bronfman was inducted into the Expos Hall of Fame as its inaugural member in 1993, and a circular patch placed on the right field wall with his name, the number 83, which he used to wear during spring training, and the words "FONDATEUR / FOUNDER".
- On April 8, 2008, the final opening day at Shea Stadium, the New York Mets unveiled a "Shea" logo which was displayed on the left-field fence next to the team's retired numbers. The stadium was named for William Shea, a prominent lawyer who was responsible for the return of National League baseball to New York.
- Walter A. Haas Jr., honorary jersey retired (with stylized Old English "A" in place of a number) in 1995, located in right field. Owner of the Oakland Athletics from 1980 until 1995. Haas purchased the team from Charles O. Finley in 1980, saving the team from potentially moving out of the area.
- At the start of the 2007 season, the Kansas City Royals designated Seat #9 in Section 127, Row C at Kauffman Stadium as the "Buck O'Neil Legacy Seat" in honor of Negro leagues legend and Royals scout Buck O'Neil. During each home game, the Royals honor a fan who exemplifies O'Neil's spirit of humanitarianism and community service by inviting that fan to sit in the Buck O'Neil Legacy Seat.
- Paul Beeston and Pat Gillick, the Toronto Blue Jays's former president and general manager, respectively, have been inducted into the team's Level of Excellence, alongside the team's retired numbers. In addition, a Baseball Hall of Fame banner for Gillick hangs in the Rogers Centre rafters.
- A statue of former Arlington, Texas mayor Tom Vandergriff is located at Vandergriff Plaza at Globe Life Park alongside those of former Texas Rangers Nolan Ryan and Iván Rodríguez, both of whom had their numbers retired. Vandergriff was responsible for bringing MLB to the Dallas–Fort Worth area.
- The New York Yankees' spring training facility, George M. Steinbrenner Field is named in honor of late Yankees owner George Steinbrenner.
- Walter O'Malley, honorary jersey retired with the "LA" Dodgers logo in place of number in 2024, in the Ring of Honor at Dodger Stadium. Owner of the Los Angeles Dodgers from 1951 to 1979 who moved the team from Brooklyn to the West Coast.

=== Umpires ===
See: Umpire (baseball) § Numbers retired by the National and American Leagues

== See also ==
- Monument Park (Yankee Stadium), includes retired numbers of the New York Yankees
