= Iwona Jasiuk =

Polish-American materials scientist and bioengineer

Iwona M. Jasiuk is a Polish-American materials scientist and bioengineer, a professor of mechanical engineering at the University of Illinois Urbana-Champaign, and the former president of the Society of Engineering Science. Her research includes work on the mechanical properties of bone, of nanocomposites, and of 3D-printed cellular structures.

== Education and career ==
Jasiuk is an immigrant to the United States from Poland, and counts Polish-French immigrant and scientist Marie Curie as one of her heroes. She studied structural engineering at the University of Illinois Chicago, graduating in 1980, and went on to earn a master's degree there in 1982. She completed a Ph.D. in theoretical and applied mechanics at Northwestern University in 1986.

She worked as a faculty member in the Michigan State University Metallurgy, Mechanics and Materials Science Department from 1986 to 1996, in the George W. Woodruff School of Mechanical Engineering at Georgia Tech from 1996 to 2004, and in the Department of Mechanical and Industrial Engineering at Concordia University in Canada from 2004 to 2006. In 2006, she took her present position at the University of Illinois Urbana-Champaign, jointly in the Department of Bioengineering and Department of Mechanical Science and Engineering. She added affiliations with the university's National Center for Supercomputing Applications and Department of Civil and Environmental Engineering in 2014, with the Carle Illinois College of Medicine in 2017, and with the Department of Aerospace Engineering in 2018.

She was president of the Society of Engineering Science for 2006.

== Recognition ==
Jasiuk was named an ASME Fellow in 2003, and a Fellow of the Society of Engineering Science in 2012.

She is the 2016 winner of the American Advanced Materials Award of the International Association of Advanced Materials.
