= Mark Rasenick =

American biologist

Mark Rasenick is an American biologist who is a professor at the University of Illinois College of Medicine. An Elected Fellow of the American Association for the Advancement of Science, his research has helped identify a membrane protein, the localization of which can be used as a biomarker for depression.
