= Carl Barger =

American baseball executive (1930-1992)

Carl F. Barger
- Born: August 18, 1930; Lewistown, Pennsylvania, U.S.
- Died: December 9, 1992 (aged 62); Louisville, Kentucky, U.S.
- Occupation(s): President of the Pittsburgh Pirates (1987–1991); President of the Florida Marlins (1991–1992)

Carl F. Barger (August 18, 1930 – December 9, 1992) was an American Pittsburgh attorney and baseball executive.

== Biography ==
Barger became the President of the Pittsburgh Pirates Major League Baseball team, serving from 1987 through the beginning of 1991. He then became the first president of the Florida Marlins (now the Miami Marlins) on July 8, 1991. However, he would not live to see the new team take the field, as he suffered an aneurysm during MLB's Winter Meetings in 1992 in Louisville, Kentucky, and later died. On April 5, 1993, the day that the Marlins played their first regular-season game, the team retired the number 5 in Barger's memory, as his favorite player had been Joe DiMaggio, who wore the number 5 throughout his career. The only other person to have a uniform number retired by the Marlins is Jackie Robinson, whose number 42 jersey has been retired throughout Major League Baseball to honor his achievement of breaking baseball's color barrier.

However, on February 11, 2012, the Miami Marlins unretired the number 5, as that number was requested to be worn by Logan Morrison, who played for the Marlins from 2012 to 2014. Barger is currently honored with a plaque inside LoanDepot Park with the number 5 depicted on it.

Additionally, the Marlins designated the practice areas and fields next to Space Coast Stadium in Viera, Florida, their original Florida Spring Training facility, as the Carl F. Barger Baseball Complex.

Preceded by Malcolm Prine	President of the Pittsburgh Pirates; 1987–1991	Succeeded by Mark Sauer
Preceded by Franchise established	President of the Florida Marlins; 1991–1992	Succeeded by Don Smiley
