= Isabella Garnett =

American physician

Isabella Garnett (August 22, 1872 – August 23, 1948) founded the first hospital in the city of Evanston, Illinois that would serve African-American patients. After her hospital merged into Evanston's new Community Hospital in 1928, she served as superintendent of that institution for more than a decade. She remains one of Evanston's best-known historical African-American residents.

Garnett used her maiden name professionally throughout her life, although she married twice. Her full name is sometimes given as Isabella Maude Garnett Butler Talley.

== Early life and education ==
Garnett was one of the seven children of Daniel F. Garnett and Hannah B. McDuffin Garnett. Her parents were among the earliest African-American settlers in Evanston, settling in the community known as "Ridgeland Village" and co-founding the Second Baptist Church of Evanston.

Garnett did not graduate from high school, but did take classes in the 1890s at a business school in Minneapolis; beginning in 1894, she worked and studied at Chicago's Provident Hospital, the first black-owned hospital in the United States, established only a few years before. She received her nursing degree in 1895, and after working as a school nurse for two years, attended Harvey Medical College from 1897 to 1899, receiving a premedical certificate. Armed with the certificate, she enrolled at Chicago's College of Physicians and Surgeons and obtained her MD in 1901, becoming one of the first African-American women MDs in Illinois.

== Butler Sanitarium ==
Garnett initially worked on Chicago's South Side, but moved back to Evanston by 1904. She married medical student Arthur Butler on January 5, 1907, practicing independently until his graduation from Northwestern University Medical School in 1909.

In 1910, Evanston-area hospitals became closed to the increasing African-American population for non-emergency care. To meet the resulting need, in 1914, Dr. Isabella Garnett and her husband, Dr. Arthur Butler, founded the Evanston Sanitarium and Training School on the upper floor of their 1918 Asbury Avenue residence in Evanston, Illinois. The Sanitarium focused on the community's most urgent needs, treating primarily acute diseases. The Evanston Sanitarium and Training School was the first African American medical center north of the Chicago loop, and it was only one of four area hospitals to accept African American patients and employ African American physicians.

Butler served as the surgeon, the general practitioner, and also handled obstetrics and anesthesia. He died suddenly in 1924. Garnett subsequently managed the Sanitarium on her own, renaming it the "Butler Memorial Hospital" in his honor.

The need for medical care for the African-American residents of Evanston and nearby communities increased in the course of the Great Migration, which lasted from 1910 to 1925 and brought a near-doubling of Evanston's black population. The Great Migration also led to intensified segregation, which extended throughout almost all institutions, from schools to pool halls. Garnett's three-room, two-story facility was the sole source of medical treatment for a community of some 5,000 African-Americans.

== Community Hospital ==
In 1930, the hospital merged with The Booker T. Washington Association of Evanston and relocated to 2026 Brown Avenue, taking the name The Community Hospital of Evanston. Dr. Garnett married Baptist minister James Talley on February 5, 1930. Dr. Garnett served as the organization's superintendent until 1945. The Community Hospital is thus sometimes considered to be a continuation of the Sanitarium. The Community Hospital began in a local doctor's large brick home, and initially boasted 18 beds. A fifty-bed facility had originally been planned, but the advent of the Great Depression put this goal out of reach. In order to raise funding for the hospital, the Women's Auxiliary of Community Hospital was formed in 1939 by hospital staff member Dr. Elizabeth Webb Hill. Dr. Hill would later become the hospital's chief of staff, becoming the first African American woman to hold the position in Illinois.

In 1952, the Community Hospital opened a new facility in order to meet growing needs. In 1980, the hospital closed and the building was converted into an apartment complex for disabled adults. In 1986, the complex was dedicated as Hill Arboretum Apartments in honor of Dr. Hill. The converted nonprofit apartment building for the disabled continues to feature pictures of Garnett and her successor Dr.Elizabeth Hill.

The Community Hospital of Evanston collection is held at the Shorefront Legacy Center in Evanston, Illinois. The collection was processed by the Black Metropolis Research Consortium Color Curtain Processing Project.

== Later life and legacy ==
Garnett had hoped to continue in private practice after retiring from the hospital, but was compelled by poor health to retire completely in 1946. On August 23, 1948, one day past her 76th birthday, she died in the hospital she founded, of complications related to heart disease. Earlier in that year, a day of National Negro Health Week had been dedicated in her honor.

The Community Hospital became a flashpoint of controversy in the 1950s, with tension between those pressing for integration rather than continued segregation of treatment facilities, and those who felt, as Garnett's successor Hill did, that "the sick can't wait." The argument was won by Hill, and Community expanded to a 56-bed facility in 1952.

Although Evanston hospitals began to serve African-American patients later in the same decade, Community continued to serve all races in Evanston until its closure in 1980.

In 1975, Evanston dedicated a 16-acre park in Garnett's name, the "Isabella G. Butler Park," often referred to as "Butler Park." The park is located on the south bank of the North Shore Channel, near the site of Community Hospital.

== Works cited ==
- Dreger, Marianne; Wishart, Patricia C. (1990). "Garnett Butler Talley, Isabella Maude". In Schulz; Hast (eds.). Women Building Chicago, 1790-1990. Indiana University Press. pp. 303–306. ISBN 0253338522.
- Peterson, Mimi (2008). Evanston. Arcadia Publishing. ISBN 978-0738551890.
