= Victor Ratten =

Australian surgeon

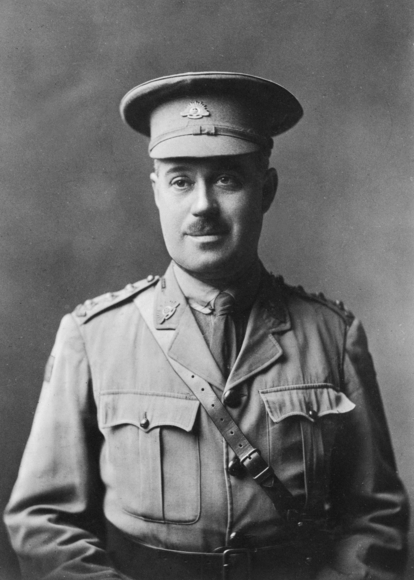
- Ratten during World War I
- Born: 12 December 1878; Kew, Victoria, Australia
- Died: 30 December 1962 (aged 84); Hobart, Tasmania, Australia
- Education: Harvey Medical College
- Occupation: Surgeon
- Spouse: Blanche Greaves (m. 1907)

Victor Richard Ratten (12 December 1878 – 30 December 1962) was an Australian surgeon and hospital administrator. He was known for his long involvement with Royal Hobart Hospital, serving as superintendent from 1917 to 1936 and as a surgeon until his death in 1962. He came into conflict with the medical establishment in Tasmania on a number of occasions and was the subject of a royal commission into his qualifications in 1918.

== Early life ==
Ratten was born on 12 December 1878 in Kew, Victoria. He was the son of Eliza Ann (née Gordon) and George William Ratten. His father was a schoolteacher and was later ordained as an Anglican minister.

Ratten spent part of his childhood in Port Fairy, Victoria. He and his family later moved to Forbes, New South Wales, where his father established a private school, the Lachlan College. He was a talented sportsman as a youth, winning several cycling championships. After leaving school, Ratten worked for the Union Bank of Australia in Forbes until 1898, when he and a friend announced their intention to travel the world by bicycle. Their progress to Sydney was reported in local newspapers but they did not proceed further.

After serving an apprenticeship with a dentist in Sydney, Ratten returned to country New South Wales in 1899 and began practising as a dentist in West Wyalong. By 1903 he had moved to Brisbane. He later spent time in the United States and in March 1907 acquired a diploma of medicine at Harvey Medical College in Chicago. The college was short-lived and the validity of Ratten's qualification was later the subject of debate.

== Medical career ==
=== Early years ===
In May 1907, Ratten established a medical practice in Sheffield, Tasmania, joining his father in the state. He practised in Sheffield for seven years and was a health officer for the Kentish Municipal Council, also serving as a justice of the peace. In August 1914, Ratten enlisted in the Australian Army Medical Corps and was attached to the 12th Battalion as a regimental medical officer. He departed for Egypt aboard HMAT Geelong in October 1914. He returned to Australia in 1915 after being unfit for military service, although he was not discharged from service until March 1918.

Ratten was refused admission to the Tasmanian branch of the British Medical Association (BMA) after its formation in 1911, as it did not recognise his American qualification. He moved to Hobart in 1916 after purchasing an existing medical practice.

=== Royal Hobart Hospital ===
Ratten was appointed surgeon-superintendent of Hobart General Hospital (later Royal Hobart Hospital) in 1917. He had a reputation as a skilled surgeon, "insisting on extremely high standards of hygiene, theatre teamwork and modern equipment".

== Personal life ==
In 1907, Ratten married Blanche Greaves, with whom he had two sons. His oldest son John Richard Ratten was an officer in the Royal Australian Air Force (RAAF) and died in 1945 while on active service.

Outside of medicine, Ratten was an antique collector and owned racehorses. His horse The Artist won the Hobart Cup and Launceston Cup in 1949, and he also won the Hobart Cup with Wingfire in 1947.

Ratten died in Hobart on 30 December 1962, aged 84.
