= Carle Foundation Hospital =

Hospital in Urbana, Illinois, United States

Coordinates: 40°07′01″N 88°12′54″W

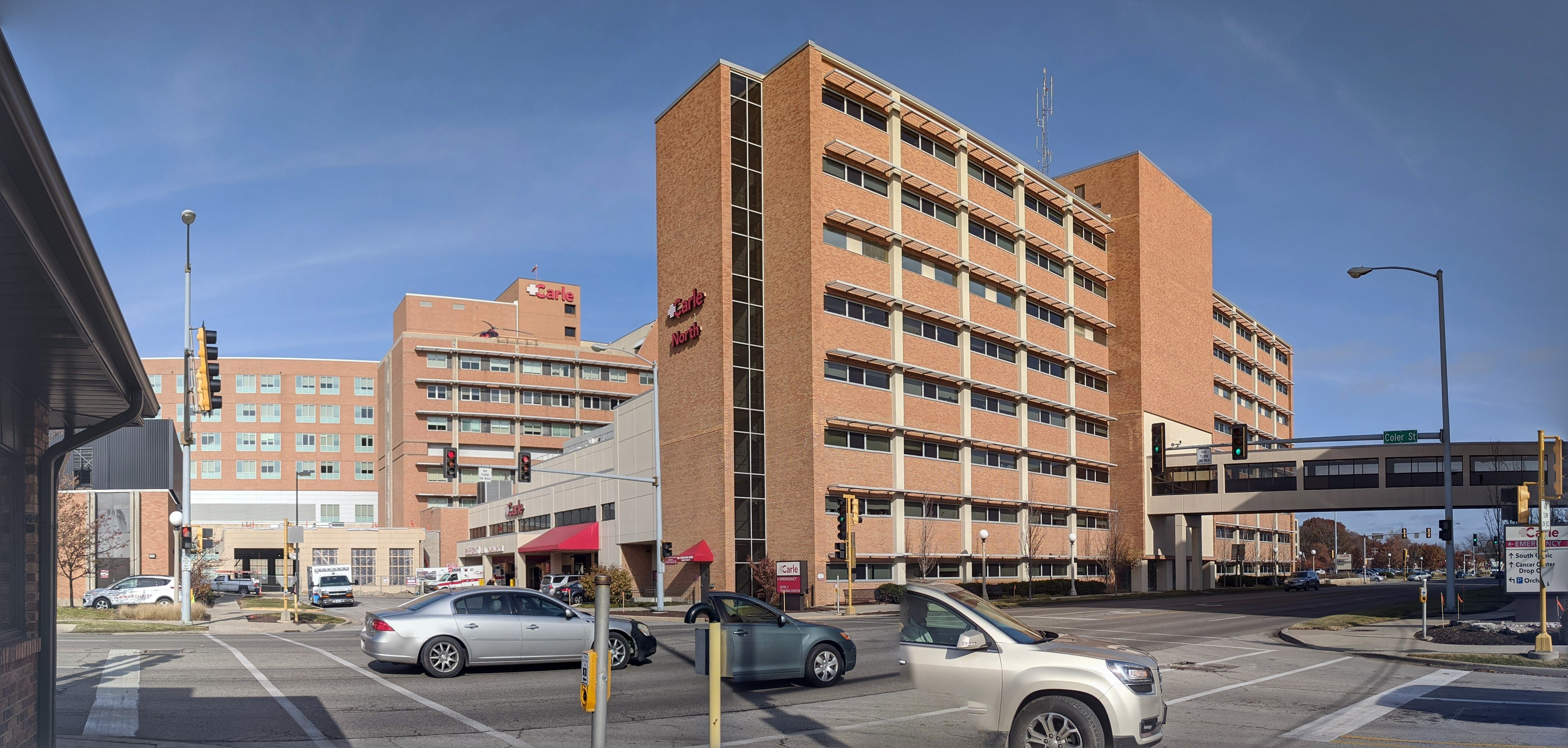
- Carle Hospital looking NE

Geography
- Location: Urbana, Illinois, United States

Services
- Emergency department: Level 1 Trauma Center
- Beds: 489

History
- Founded: 1931

Links
- Website: www.carle.org
- Lists: Hospitals in Illinois

Carle Foundation Hospital is a 489-bed regional care hospital in Urbana, Illinois, United States. It is owned by the not-for-profit (NFPO) Carle Foundation, which also consists of Carle Physician Group and Health Alliance Medical Plans. The hospital serves as the primary teaching hospital of the Carle Illinois College of Medicine at the University of Illinois at Urbana-Champaign.

The hospital is the region's only level-1 trauma center. It received Magnet designation. The Carle Health system also includes Carle BroMenn Medical Center, Carle Eureka Hospital, Carle Hoopeston Regional Health Center, Carle Methodist Hospital, Carle Pekin Hospital, Carle Proctor Hospital, and Carle Richland Memorial Hospital.

The hospital is part of a vertically integrated system led by James Leonard, President and CEO since 2000. He has served Carle since the early 1980s.

== History ==
The history of these entities began in 1918 when Margaret Burt Carle Morris left $40,000 to the City of Urbana, Illinois for the purpose of starting a hospital. Her donation led to the creation of The Urbana Memorial Hospital Association.

In 1931, J.C. Thomas Rogers and Hugh L. Davison, two physicians from the Mayo Clinic in Rochester, Minnesota, moved to Urbana and opened what was then called Carle Memorial Hospital and the Rogers-Davison Clinic. Housed in the abandoned Eastern Illinois Medical Sanitarium, the Clinic and 15-bed Hospital introduced the concept of multi-specialty group practice to the area.

Though the Clinic and Hospital were separated into two distinct organizations in 1946, they were reunited on April 1, 2010.

The 433-bed regional care hospital has achieved Magnet designation, the United States' highest honor for nursing care. It offers a more advanced level of clinical expertise and technology than any other area hospital, housing the area's only level I trauma center as well as level III perinatal services. The hospital admitted more than 20,500 patients and treated more than 63,300 patients in the emergency room during 2009.

In 2020, the Carle Health system bought BroMenn Medical Center in Normal, Illinois and Eureka Hospital in Eureka, Illinois from Advocate Aurora Health. In 2023, the Carle Health system finalized a deal to purchase Methodist and Proctor Hospitals in Peoria, Illinois and Pekin Hospital in Pekin, Illinois from UnityPoint Health.
