= Harvey Medical College =

School in Chicago, Illinois, US

Harvey Medical College was a co-educational night school in Chicago, Illinois that offered training in various medical fields.

Harvey Medical College was one of over 20 medical schools that opened in Chicago between 1890 and 1910, but unlike many of these it offered a real education and was not just a diploma mill.

Frances Dickinson served for periods as president, secretary and chair of ophthalmology at the college.

== Notable alumni ==
African-American physician Isabella Garnett obtained a premedical certificate from Harvey Medical College in 1899.

Australian dentist Victor Ratten obtained a medical diploma from Harvey Medical College in 1907 and subsequently practised as a surgeon in Australia. His medical qualifications were the subject of a Tasmanian royal commission in 1918 following the objections of the local medical profession to his appointment as superintendent of Hobart General Hospital.

== Sources ==
- Journal of the American Medical Association Vol. 27, No. 22, 28 November 1896
- Chicatgo Encyclopedia article on Medical education
