= Nathaniel Oglesby Calloway =

American chemist and physician (1907–1979)

- Born: October 10, 1907; Tuskegee, Alabama, US
- Died: December 3, 1979 (aged 72)
- Education: Iowa State University
- Spouse: Doris
- Children: David (son)
- Relatives: Peter (grandson)
- Scientific career
- Fields: Chemistry; Medicine
- Workplaces: Tuskegee Institute; University of Illinois Medical School; Provident Hospital (Chicago)
- Doctoral advisor: Henry Gilman

Nathaniel Oglesby Calloway (October 10, 1907 – December 3, 1979) was an American chemist and physician. Calloway was the first African American to receive an academic doctorate from an institute west of the Mississippi River and the first African American to receive a PhD in chemistry from Iowa State University (ISU).

== Early life and education ==
Calloway was born on October 10, 1907, in Tuskegee, Alabama. He was one of five children born to his father James N Calloway, who was a former slave and his mother Marietta Oglesby. His father graduated from Fisk University in Nashville, Tennessee when he was 30 years old. Additionally, he was an associate of Booker T. Washington. His father also served in Africa for the German government as an industrial colonizer. In his childhood days he spent time with George Washington Carver, who was a well-known soil chemist and also a faculty member at Tuskegee Institute now named Tuskegee University.

Calloway's early education of elementary and high school was conducted in Tuskegee, Alabama. In 1926, he enrolled at Iowa State University. He studied at Iowa State University and completed his B.S in 1930. Three years later, in 1933, he became the first African American to earn his Ph.D. in organic chemistry. Henry Gillman was Calloway's Ph.D. advisor at Iowa State University. He was one of the few African American chemistry majors Gillman helped obtain their doctorates at ISU. Once he received his doctorate he led the department of chemistry at Tuskegee Institute from 1933 to 1935. Following in his father's foot steps, he became an assistant professor in Fisk University's chemistry department. He taught in Fisk University's chemistry department until 1940.

Calloway continued his research and earned his M.D. degree from the University of Illinois in 1943. Calloway served as an assistant professor at the University of Illinois Medical School and worked as a practicing physician and earned a specialist degree in internal medicine. Between 1944 and 1947 he did significant studies as the director of a US Naval project. In 1946, he published approximately 17 papers and had four more in process. His research was in chemistry, pharmacology and internal medicine. In 1947, Calloway rose from assistant to senior professor at University of Illinois Medical School and he served as medical director at Provident Hospital where he remained for two years. He created the Medical Associates of Chicago, composed of 12 doctors who worked with state of the art equipment. During the Korean War he served as the Assistant Chief of Medicine at Percy Jones Army Hospital and was promoted to major. In the 1970s, he taught at the University of Wisconsin, Madison.

== Career and Interest ==
Author, chemist, physician, scientist, and civil rights activist, he was a pioneer in the field of chemistry. Calloway was an organic chemist, physician, military officer, and educator. Immediately after getting his Ph.D., Calloway became head of the chemistry department at the Tuskegee Institute in Alabama. Calloway was also a professor at the University of Illinois Medical School and wrote more than 30 scientific articles and publications in scientific journals. He served as a medical director of Provident Hospital in Chicago until 1949, and then founded the Medical Associates Clinic of Chicago. Later, Calloway became the chief of medical services for Veterans Administration Hospital in Tomah, Wisconsin. In 1958, Calloway opened a group medical practice in Chicago. He became Chief of the Medical Staff at the Tomah Wisconsin Veterans Administration Hospital in 1963. He then opened a private practice in Madison in 1966.

Calloway studied synthetic organic chemistry, a branch of chemistry that focuses on compounds that contain the element carbon. He also had a passion for writing Calloway published several peer-reviewed articles in top chemistry journals such as the Journal of the American Chemical Society.

While still practicing medicine in Chicago in the 1950s, he built a 400-acre showplace in Wisconsin, the Grand Marsh Wildlife Ranch, where wild and domestic animals that were kept in large, natural habitats.

He continued to volunteer his time with the Tuskegee Institute and with Iowa State until his death from cancer in 1979.

== Shadow Doctor ==
In 2021, Calloway's grandson Peter wrote the 5-issue comic book series Shadow Doctor for AfterShock Comics. This so-called "true story" claims that on his deathbed Calloway confessed to his son David that as a young man he was a driver for Italian mobsters in Chicago. Years later, as a young African-American doctor unable to find work in white hospitals, he went to his former mob associate Al Capone for a loan to start his own practice. Capone instead gifted him an office and money for hospital supplies so that Calloway could work as a doctor in Capone's employ, although Calloway did acquire regular patients after a time. Calloway would eventually betray Capone to the United States Department of Justice. At this time, no elements of the comic book have been substantiated by outside evidence.
