= Donald Jensen =

American medical researcher

Donald Jensen is an American hepatitis C researcher and clinician, and Richard B. Capps Chair Emeritus, Rush University Medical Center. He attended high school in Springfield, IL, and was an undergraduate at the University of Illinois Champaign-Urbana. He attained his MD degree from the University of Illinois College of Medicine, and completed an internal medicine residency and chief medical resident at Rush University. He was subsequently a liver research fellow at King's College Hospital in London, UK, before returning to Rush as a faculty member. In 1999, he was appointed as the Richard B. Capps Professor of Medicine and chief of the section of hepatology. In 2005, he moved to the University of Chicago School of Medicine as professor of medicine and director of the Center for Liver Disease. In 2016, he assumed the position of Professor of Medicine at Rush University Medical Center.

In early 1990s he was a clinical investigator at Rush University who helped to develop a drug interferon for hepatitis C, and in 1998 assisted in the development of the combination of interferon and ribavirin for the treatment of chronic hepatitis C. In 2007, Dr. Jensen was featured as the Top Doc in Chicago Magazine. In May 2011, two new antiviral agents for which he performed investigations, have been released: telaprevir and boceprevir. In 2022, he was the recipient of the American Liver Foundation Legacy Award.

He is a Fellow of the American College of Physicians and of the American Association for the Study of Liver Diseases.
