= Mark Sauer =

American physician (born 1955)

Mark V. Sauer, MD, MS
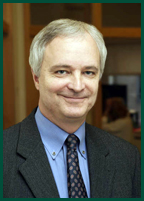
- Born: January 17, 1955 (age 71); Cedar Falls, IA, United States
- Education: Washington University in St. Louis; University of Illinois Chicago; Columbia University
- Occupation: Physician
- Known for: Reproductive medicine

Mark V. Sauer is an American physician who specializes in reproductive medicine. He is a clinician, researcher and medical educator best known for his work in the development of egg and embryo donation, fertility care of HIV-seropositive patients, and reproductive bioethics. He currently is Professor and Chairman of Obstetrics, Gynecology and Reproductive Sciences at Rutgers Robert Wood Johnson Medical School in New Brunswick, New Jersey. He also serves as the Senior Associate Dean for Women's Health there. Sauer was the Chief of the Division of Reproductive Endocrinology at Columbia University Medical Center in New York City for twenty-one years, where he was also the program and laboratory director of the Center for Women's Reproductive Care, and a tenured professor and vice-chairman in the Department of Obstetrics and Gynecology at the College of Physicians and Surgeons, Columbia University. While at Columbia University he also served on the Medical Ethics Committee of New York Presbyterian-Columbia University Medical Center.

== Biography and education ==
Sauer received an A.B. degree in biology from Washington University in St. Louis in 1976. He received an M.D. from the University of Illinois College of Medicine in 1980. Sauer received a M.S. in Bioethics from Columbia University in 2017. He completed his residency in obstetrics and gynecology at the University of Illinois Hospital in 1984 and then obtained sub-specialty training in reproductive endocrinology at the University of California in Los Angeles, Harbor-UCLA Medical Center, under the mentorship of John Buster. Sauer has been married since 1979 to Lynda Marie (Treppa) Sauer and has 4 children.

== Career ==
Sauer achieved the world's first donor egg pregnancies in older menopausal women while serving as an associate professor at the University of Southern California in Los Angeles. Sauer's other projects included the introduction of methotrexate for the nonsurgical treatment of ectopic pregnancies, and more recently the use of semen washing techniques to prevent the transmission of HIV in couples wishing to conceive when the wife is uninfected. He also developed a program for procuring eggs for stem cell therapy from paid donors.

Sauer has served on the editorial board of several medical journals. He is the Associate Editor of Fertility and Sterility Reports. He has written more than 370 peer-reviewed articles, and 50 book chapters related to reproductive endocrinology and infertility. He was a three-term member of the Ethics Committee of the American Society for Reproductive Medicine (ASRM).

Sauer is known for his work in establishing pregnancies in women following natural menopause. While an associate professor at the University of Southern California (USC), he headed the egg donation program that established the first pregnancies in women who were in their 40s, 50s and 60s. His series of experiments and work were published in The New England Journal of Medicine, the Journal of the American Medical Association and the Lancet. He was credited as being a pioneer in reproductive medical research and has been interviewed by Time, Newsweek, the New York Times, The Los Angeles Times and People, as well as television programs such as “Dateline,” "Charlie Rose",” “20/20,” “Nightline,” “The CBS Sunday Morning Show,” “Good Morning America,” and “Today”.

Sauer served for many years as a board examiner for both obstetrics and gynecology and the sub-specialty of reproductive endocrinology for the American Board of Obstetrics and Gynecology. In the past he has served as a medical consultant to the New York State Department of Health, the New York State Task Force on Life and the Law, the New Jersey State Department of Health and the California Institute for Regenerative Medicine.

== Publications ==
=== Books ===
- Sauer, Mark V. Principles of Oocyte and Embryo Donation, London: Springer, 1st. ed., 1998 2nd ed. 2013 ISBN 9781447123927. According to WorldCat, the book is held in 226 libraries
- Sauer, Mark V. "Principles of Oocyte and Embryo Donation", London: Springer, 2nd ed. 2013 ISBN 9781447123927.
