= Robin Horsager-Boehrer =

Robyn Horsager-Boehrer is an American obstetrician and gynecologist, currently the Luis Leib, M.D. Professor in Obstetrics & Gynecology at University of Texas Southwestern Medical Center. She is a graduate of the University of Illinois College of Medicine (1987), and did her residency in obstetrics and gynecology at Parkland Memorial Hospital (1991).
