= Don Smiley =

American baseball executive

Donald Smiley
- Born: December 11, 1955 (age 70); Racine, Wisconsin, U.S.
- Education: St. Catherine High School; University of Wisconsin-Oshkosh
- Occupations: Former President and CEO, Milwaukee World Festival Inc. (2004-2023)

Donald A. Smiley (born December 11, 1955) is the former president and chief executive officer of Summerfest and a former Major League Baseball executive. He served as president of the Florida Marlins from 1994 to 1998, taking over after the death of Carl Barger. He is a graduate of the University of Wisconsin–Oshkosh.

== Career ==
After graduating from college, Smiley worked at WFRV-TV in Green Bay first as a cameraman and then as an assignment reporter. He went on to work as district sales manager for Hoffmaster Paper Company in Oshkosh from 1979 until 1982 when he left to become the director of marketing for the Honda Classic PGA Tournament in Florida in 1982.

=== Florida Marlins ===
In 1991, Smiley became the vice president and chief spokesman for South Florida Big League Baseball during which he helped secure the expansion of Florida Marlins. He served as president of the Marlins from 1994 to 2000. The owner of the Florida Marlins at the time, Wayne Huizenga, tried to arrange a sale of the Marlins to Smiley for $169 million in 1997.

=== Summerfest ===
Smiley was hired in 2004 as the CEO of Summerfest, an annual music festival held at the Henry Maier Festival Park along the lakefront in Milwaukee, Wisconsin. In 2012, Smiley's compensation as Summerfest CEO was $886,185 according to Milwaukee World Festival.

In December 2023, he retired from his position as president and CEO
