= Uniform number (Major League Baseball) =

Numbering in american baseball

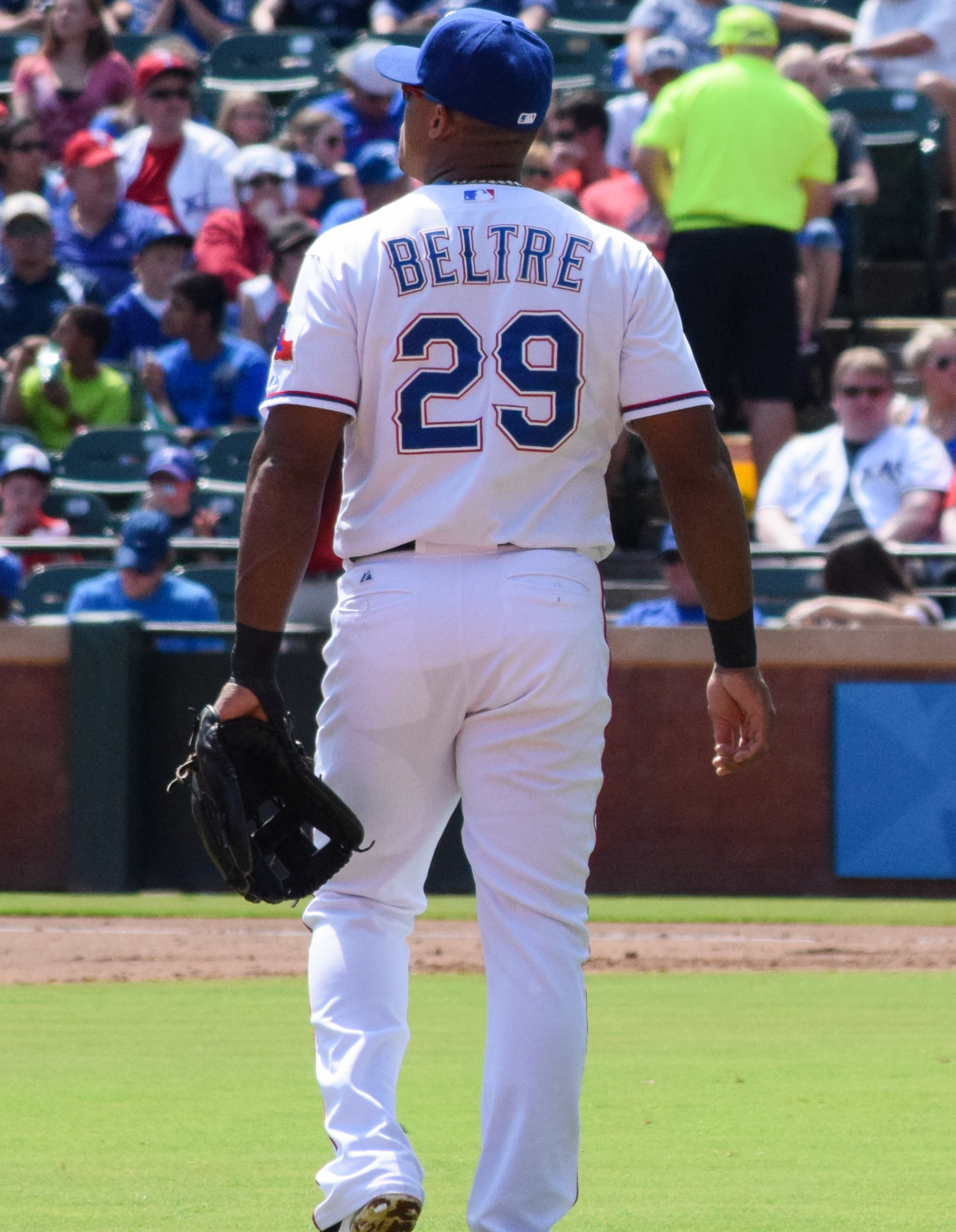
Adrián Beltré wore uniform number 29 while playing for the Texas Rangers. His number was later retired by the team.

In baseball, the uniform number is a number worn on the uniform of each player and coach. Numbers are used for the purpose of easily identifying each person on the field as no two people from the same team can wear the same number. (Note: A notable exception to this is Jackie Robinson Day, on which all when all uniformed personnel wear number 42 in recognition of Jackie Robinson.) Although designed for identification purposes only, numbers have become the source of superstition, emotional attachment, and honor (in the form of a number retirement). In Major League Baseball, player and manager numbers are always located on the back of the jersey. A smaller number is often found on the front of the jersey, while umpires wear their numbers on the uniform shirt sleeve.

According to common tradition, single-digit numbers are worn by position players but rarely by pitchers, and numbers 60 and higher were rarely worn at all until the 2010s. Higher numbers are worn during spring training by players whose eventual place on the team is uncertain; they are also sometimes worn during the regular season by players recently called up from the minor leagues. However, such players usually change to a more traditional number once it becomes clear that they will stay with the team. These traditions are not enforced by any rule, and exceptions are common. Examples of star players wearing numbers higher than 60 include Carlton Fisk (72), (Note: Fisk wore number 72 while with the Chicago White Sox from 1981 to 1993. It was the reverse of the number 27, which he wore from 1971 to 1980 with the Boston Red Sox.) Kenley Jansen (74), and Aaron Judge (99). In 2018, Blake Snell became the first pitcher wearing a single-digit number (4) to appear in the All-Star Game and the first to win the Cy Young Award.

== History ==
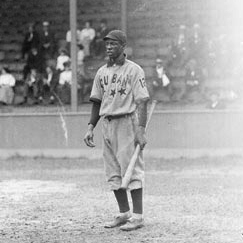
José Méndez of the Cuban Stars, seen with a uniform number on his left sleeve during a 1909 game in Chicago

The idea of assigning numbers to players was first proposed as a means of allowing spectators to more easily identify each player on the field. The practice of numbering competitors in other sports was already decades old when, in 1894, an unnamed individual suggested to James Hart, president of the Chicago Colts, that his players should wear uniform numbers. On December 29, 1894, the St. Louis Post-Dispatch wrote of the National League club: "Every one who has attended a ball game knows how puzzled one occasionally gets in endeavoring to recognize some player or trying to locate a man who is on the team, but whose position has been changed from that signified on the score-card. The plan suggested to Mr. Hart is very simple. It is for every man on the team to have a separate number, which he shall keep throughout the season....On the score-cards, the names of the players, with their numbers, shall be printed; and in this way the spectator can readily identify any player on the field." However, there is no record of the Colts implementing the suggestion.

In 1906, the team, which had since been renamed the Chicago Cubs, devised a uniform numbering system in which, rather than sewing numbers onto jerseys, each player's number would be printed next to their name on the game's scorecard. Within this system, which was also adopted by other teams over the next few years, stadium scoreboards would display the team's lineups in numerical form. In order to determine the players corresponding to the numbers on the scoreboard, fans in attendance would have to buy the scorecard. Teams frequently changed player numbers in order to render previous scorecards unusable. By 1911, the system was employed by both Chicago teams, the Cubs and the White Sox, as well as the Boston Braves, Boston Red Sox, Cleveland Indians, Detroit Tigers, Pittsburgh Pirates, and Washington Nationals.

The earliest official record of numbers being physically placed onto uniforms is from 1907, when the Reading Red Roses of the Atlantic League numbered player jerseys in an effort to help fans identify them. While it is unknown if the team ever took the field with numbers, the National Baseball Hall of Fame and Museum cites the Red Roses as the first team verified to have numbered their players. The earliest photographic evidence of a baseball uniform number dates back to 1909. In an issue of the Chicago Daily News, star pitcher José Méndez, then playing for the Cuban Stars, a traveling Negro league baseball team of the early 1900s, is seen wearing the number 12 on his left sleeve.

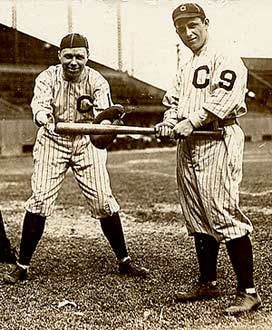
Players on the Cleveland Indians wearing uniforms with numbers on their left sleeves in 1916. The Indians were the first team to introduce numbered uniforms in the major leagues.

The first time that a Major League team wore numbers was on June 26, 1916. (Note: Negro League teams that played between 1920 and 1948 are considered to be major league teams. However, Negro League teams that wore uniform numbers before 1920, such as the 1909 Cuban Stars, are not considered part of major league history.) Inspired by the usage of numbers in football and hockey, the Cleveland Indians added large numbers to their left sleeves for a game on their home field. This experiment was tried for a few weeks, then again the next season, before being abandoned. In 1923, the St. Louis Cardinals adopted uniform numbers on their sleeves. However, as then-manager Branch Rickey recalled, the now-easily identifiable players were "subjected to field criticism from the stands and especially from opposing players," so the numbers were removed. Other clubs to experiment with uniform numbers on their sleeves in 1923 include the Indianapolis ABCs of the Negro National League and the San Antonio Bears of the Texas League.

In 1929, both the Indians and the New York Yankees were planning to start the season with uniform numbers on the back of the jersey. Both teams were scheduled to begin their seasons on April 16, however, a rainout forced the Yankees to postpone their season opener. The Indians played their game as scheduled, in the process becoming the first major league team to wear uniform numbers on the back of the jersey. The practice of adding uniform numbers to home and road jerseys became universal in the American and National Leagues in 1937, when the Philadelphia Athletics became the last team to do so.

=== Numbers in other places on the uniform ===
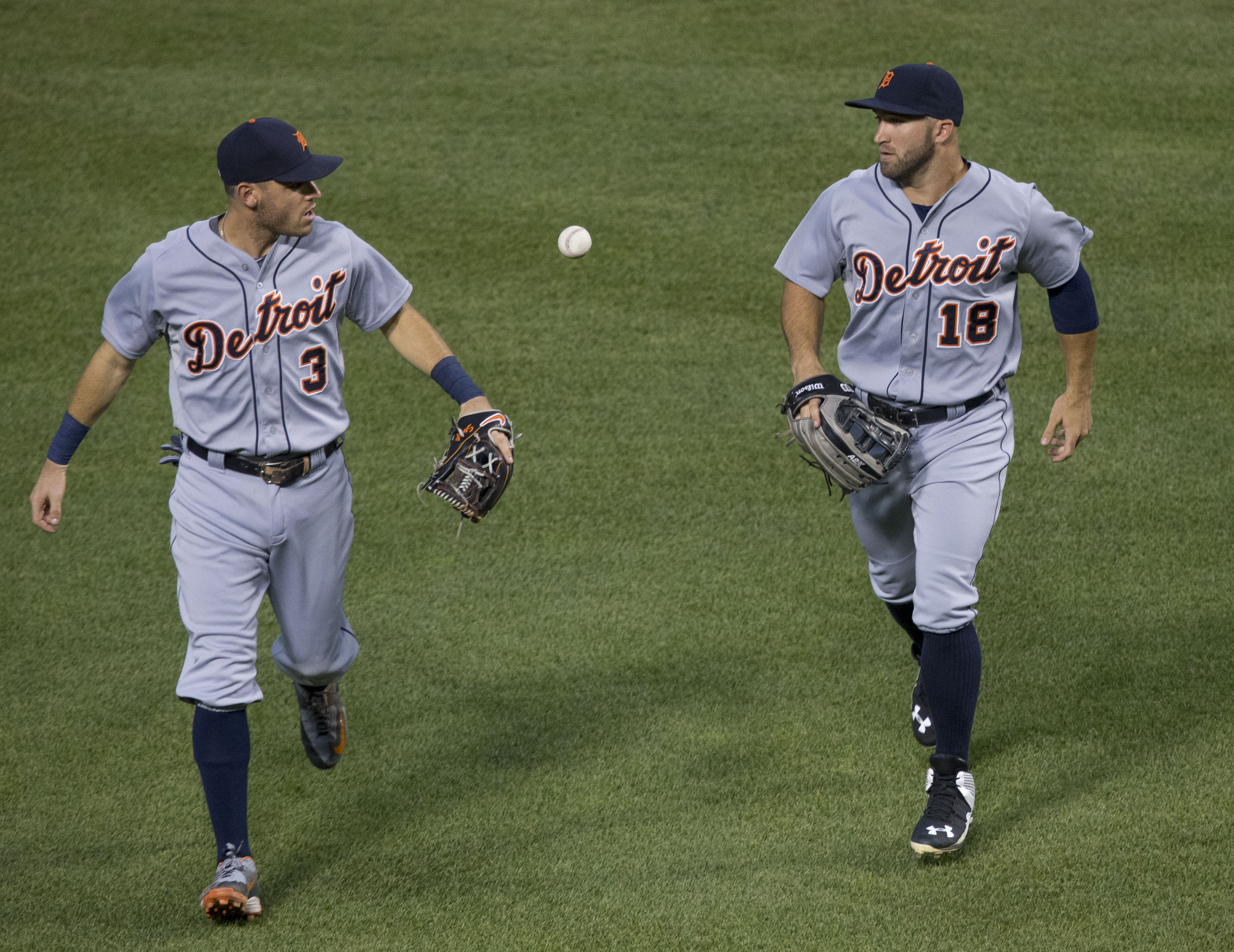
Ian Kinsler (3) and Tyler Collins (18) sporting numbers on the front of their road jerseys while playing for the Detroit Tigers in 2015

In 1951, the Springfield Cubs of the International League pioneered the concept of placing numbers on the front of the jersey. A year later, the Brooklyn Dodgers incorporated the idea as well.

Today, numbers on the front are common at all levels of play. In 1940, the Memphis Red Sox of the Negro American League wore numbers on their pants. The idea was also incorporated by the Houston Astros from 1975 to 1978, placing the number on their left hip. The Chicago White Sox also wore left hip numbers from 1982 to 1989.

Until 2022, the Philadelphia Phillies were the only Major League team to wear a number on the sleeve of their jerseys; it was removed to eventually see it replaced by a sponsorship patch from Independence Blue Cross, in line with the rest of the league. The White Sox did so from 1971 to 1975, and the St. Louis Cardinals did in 1979 and 1980.

== Rules ==
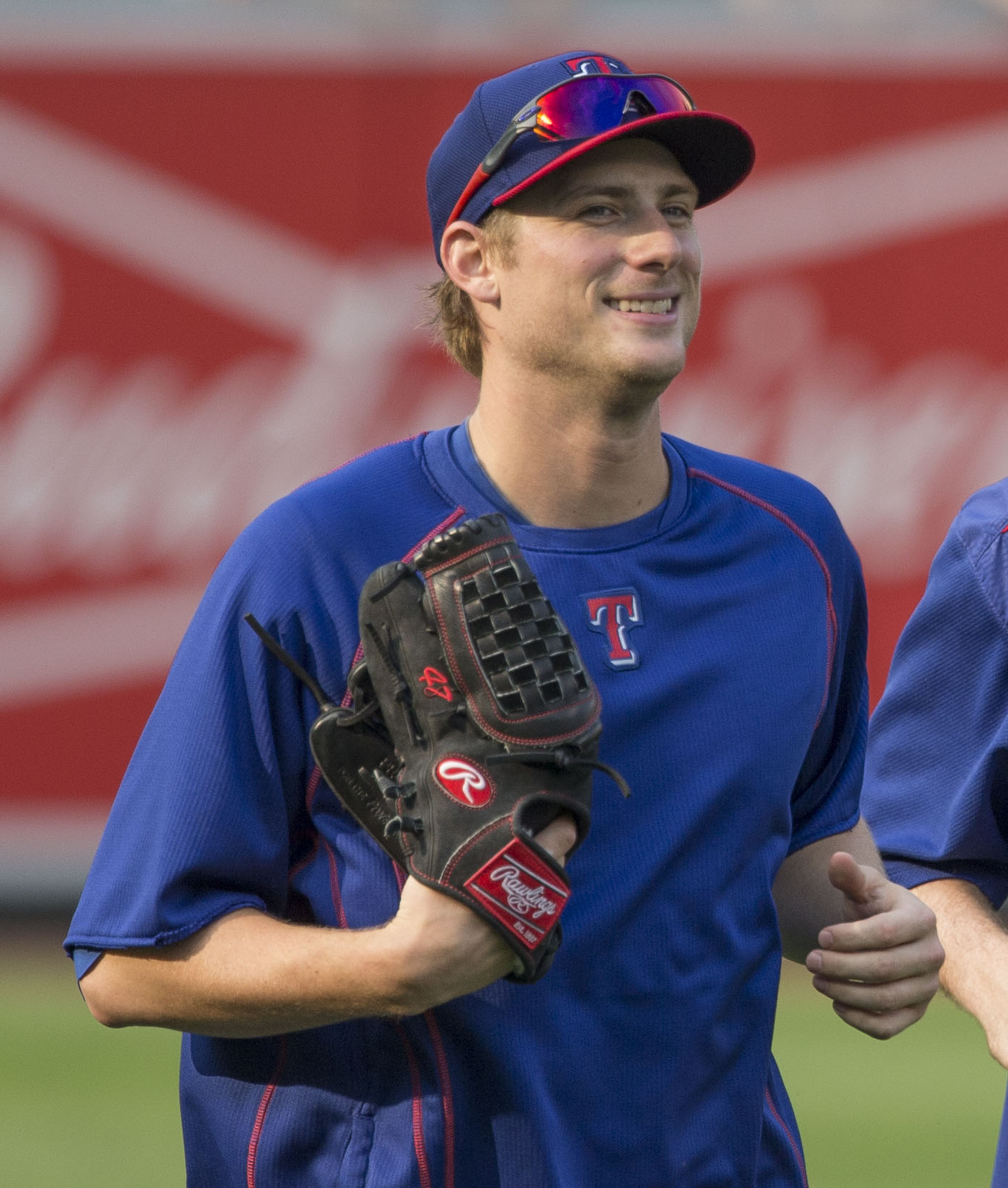
Players' equipment and accessories often also include their uniform numbers, as seen on Ross Detwiler's glove.

The official rules of baseball state that uniforms must be identical for all members of a team. The only mention of uniform number is that it must be on the back and a minimum of six inches tall. Each player must have their own unique number, but there is no rule requiring coaches to have unique numbers. For example, in 2015, Alan Trammell (who wore number 3 for his lengthy career as a Detroit Tigers player and manager) returned to coach first base and wore 3 again, despite the number belonging to Ian Kinsler at the time, marking a rare instance of a coach sharing a number with a player.

=== Deviations from the rules ===
Despite the Yankees' adoption of uniform numbers for players, managers and coaches in 1929, future Baseball Hall of Fame manager Joe McCarthy insisted on wearing a numberless jersey when he was appointed skipper of the Bombers in 1931. He maintained that tradition through his illustrious 15-plus-year term in the Bronx, when he led the Yankees to eight American League pennants, seven World Series championships, and 1,460 regular-season wins through May 23, 1946. Then, when McCarthy became manager of the Boston Red Sox in 1948, he continued the practice of wearing a numberless jersey until his retirement on June 23, 1950. Sportswiters and historians have speculated that the reserved, self-effacing McCarthy eschewed wearing a number to focus attention on his players, not himself.

In their first career games, Cincinnati Reds outfielder Eric Davis and Chicago White Sox pitcher Joe Horlen did not have jersey numbers. Both of these players were just called up to the big league team while it was on the road and the only uniform available had no number.

On September 27, 1999, Detroit Tigers center fielder Gabe Kapler took the field donning a numberless uniform. That day, the Tigers played their last game at historic Tiger Stadium and, in honor of great Tigers of the past, members of the starting lineup wore the uniform numbers of corresponding members of an All-Time Detroit Tigers team voted on by the fans. Since Kapler played center field, he was to wear Ty Cobb's uniform number, but since Cobb played before numbers were used, Kapler's back was blank.

For the 100th anniversary of Fenway Park on April 20, 2012, the Boston Red Sox and New York Yankees wore 1912-style uniforms which had no numbers.

On Jackie Robinson Day, teams across MLB all wear uniform number 42. [See "Retired numbers," below.]

On August 21, 2012, the Boston Red Sox played their first home game since the death of Johnny Pesky, and all players wore his retired number 6 jersey during the game.

On September 26, 2016, the Miami Marlins played their first home game since the death of Jose Fernandez, and all players wore his number 16 jersey during the game.

On July 12, 2019, the Angels played their first home game since the death of pitcher Tyler Skaggs, and all players wore his number 45 jersey during the game. After the game, a combined no-hitter, the players removed their Skaggs jerseys and laid them around the mound to honor his memory.

On September 9, 2020, all players and field coaches of the Pittsburgh Pirates wore Roberto Clemente's number 21 in his honor. A number of Puerto Rican MLB players, as well as Milwaukee Brewers pitcher Brent Suter, also wore number 21 in honor of Clemente. Beginning in September 2021, Latin American players and Roberto Clemente Award winners were given the option to wear number 21 during Roberto Clemente Day.

On March 31, 2025, the Athletics played their first home game since the death of Rickey Henderson, and all players wore his retired number 24 jersey during the game.

== Number assignments ==
The original baseball numbers were based on the lineup. The starting players would be numbered 1-8, based on their spot in the order. The backup catcher would be number 9, and the pitchers would wear 10-14 (but not 13, as it is considered unlucky). Notable examples of this system are teammates Babe Ruth (he was number 3 and batted third for the Yankees) and Lou Gehrig (number 4, batted fourth).

=== Experiments with numbers by position ===
Several teams experimented with numbering-by-position during the 1930s. In 1939, the Cincinnati Reds, under general manager Warren Giles, introduced what would be the longest-lasting convention, in which pitchers customarily wore numbers between 30 and 49; outfielders between 20 and 29; infielders between 10 and 19; and catchers, coaches and managers in the single digits—with the manager often sporting number 1. (An exception briefly occurred in the early 1950s, when Cincinnati's coaches and managers were assigned numbers in the 50s.)

The New York Giants adopted this system in 1947, and when Giles became chief executive of the National League in 1952, many other NL clubs began to follow suit. Two American League teams, the first season of the expansion Los Angeles Angels and the Cleveland Indians beginning in 1963, also adopted the numbering scheme.

In his 1969 memoir, Ball Four, pitcher Jim Bouton tells how he asked his new NL team, the Houston Astros, for his traditional number 56 (which he had worn with both the New York Yankees and the Seattle Pilots), but was assigned 44 instead because of the Astros' numbering custom. Bouton wrote: "I asked if there was any chance I could get 56. [The equipment manager] said he didn't think so, that all our pitchers have numbers in the 30s and 40s. He said I'd have to talk to [general manager Spec] Richardson or manager Harry Walker if I wanted to change the rule. I said I was sure they wouldn't want to be bothered with something so small, and he said, 'Oh, you'd be surprised.' Oh no I wouldn't."

However, the number-by-position convention was never a formal rule, although one was proposed by Giles at the 1958 Winter Meetings. Moreover, a few National League clubs — notably the Dodgers — consistently resisted the idea. The custom was slowly abandoned during the 1970s and 1980s. (In fact, in 1970, the Astros assigned Bouton his traditional number 56.)

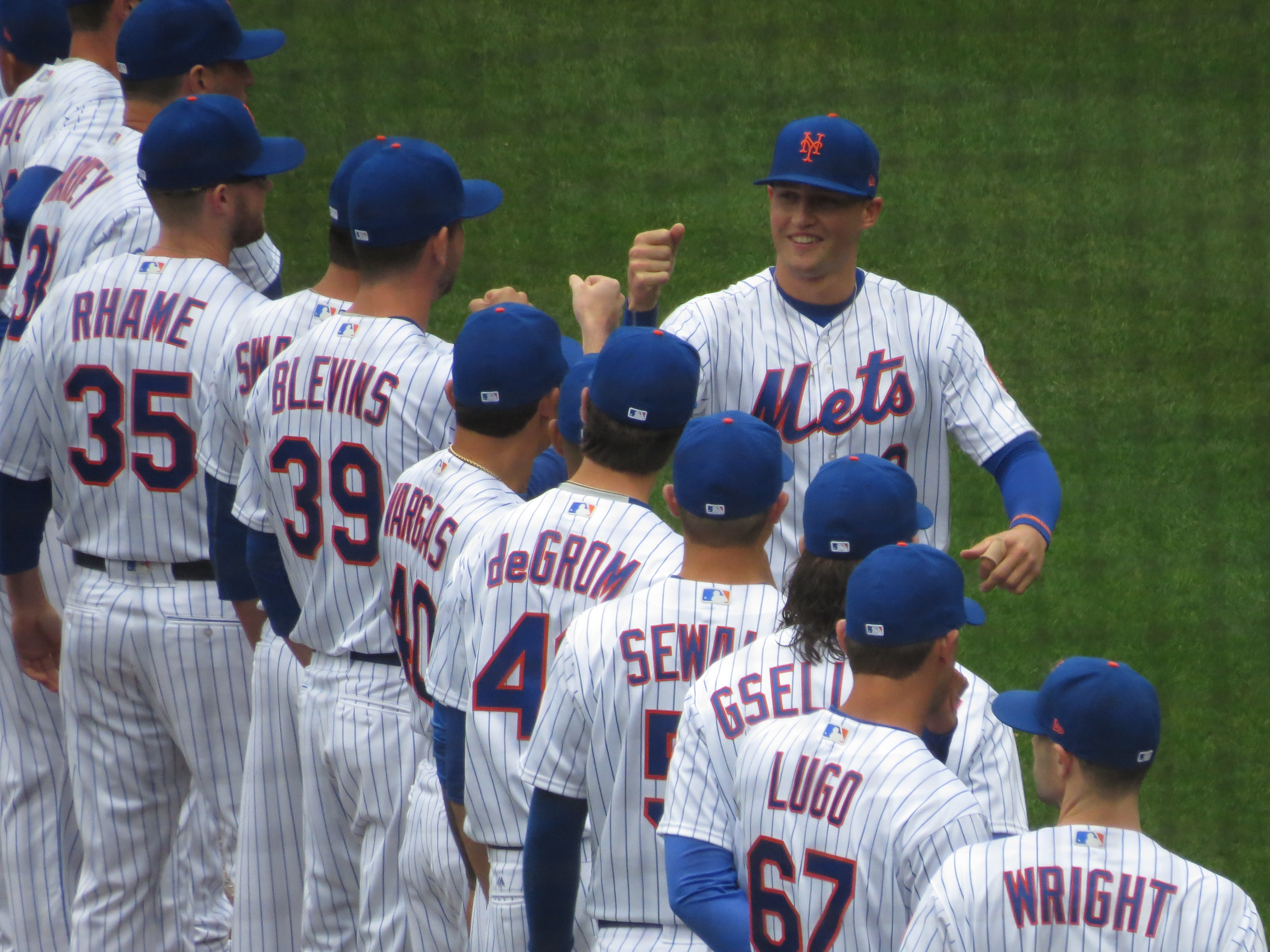
Pitchers on the 2018 New York Mets wearing uniform numbers which are characteristically all greater than 30. Note the presence of number 67 on one uniform; uncommon in 20th century baseball, uniform numbers over 60 are increasingly used in the 21st.

=== Numbering conventions ===
Despite today's MLB teams no longer assigning numbers solely by a predefined systems, some trends regarding player numbers include the following:

- Uniform numbers are either one or two digits - no MLB player has ever worn a number of three or more digits. Numbers used are positive and whole, except in one specific special case: Eddie Gaedel, a little person who made one plate appearance for the St. Louis Browns as a publicity stunt in 1951, wore the fractional number 1/8.
  - Players in the Developmental Player System of Nippon Professional Baseball's (NPB), the Japanese Major Leagues, are required to wear a three-digit number with either a leading 0, 1, or 2 (e.g.: 101, 001, or 201); these are developmental practice squad players who may only play in NPB's minor leagues, the Eastern League and Western League.
- Pitchers traditionally wear higher numbers and do not typically wear single-digit numbers. This was particularly true from the 1950s through the 1980s, when single-digit uniform numbers for pitchers were virtually never used. Since then, a pitcher sporting a single-digit number has become less rare.
- Numbers 60 and above have historically been rarely worn in the regular season. During spring training, such high numbers are often given to players who are perceived as unlikely to make the regular-season team. It is generally thought that the higher the number, the less chance of making the team. However, as rosters expand, as more low numbers are retired, and as players adopt high numbers as a means of self-expression, uniform numbers in the 60s or higher are becoming increasingly common. As many as 292 MLB players wore a uniform number in the 60s or 70s during the 2024 season; all but 30 were pitchers.
- Number 49 is traditionally sought out by knuckleball throwing pitchers: notable examples include Hoyt Wilhelm, Charlie Hough, Tim Wakefield, and Tom Candiotti.
- In Japan's NPB, number 18 is often reserved for the ace pitcher. Upon arriving in MLB, Japanese "import" pitchers have sought the number again (including Hiroki Kuroda, Daisuke Matsuzaka, Hisashi Iwakuma, Kenta Maeda, Yusei Kikuchi, and Yoshinobu Yamamoto). Yu Darvish and Masahiro Tanaka both took on other numbers in the same range (Darvish with number 11, Tanaka with number 19).
- Numbers 0 and 00 are uncommon, but have been used by several players. The New York Yankees, whose single-digit numbers higher than zero have all been retired, had in the past resisted issuing the number zero to a particular player, but would finally do so in 2019 when they signed Adam Ottavino, who has worn the number for all but two Major League seasons.

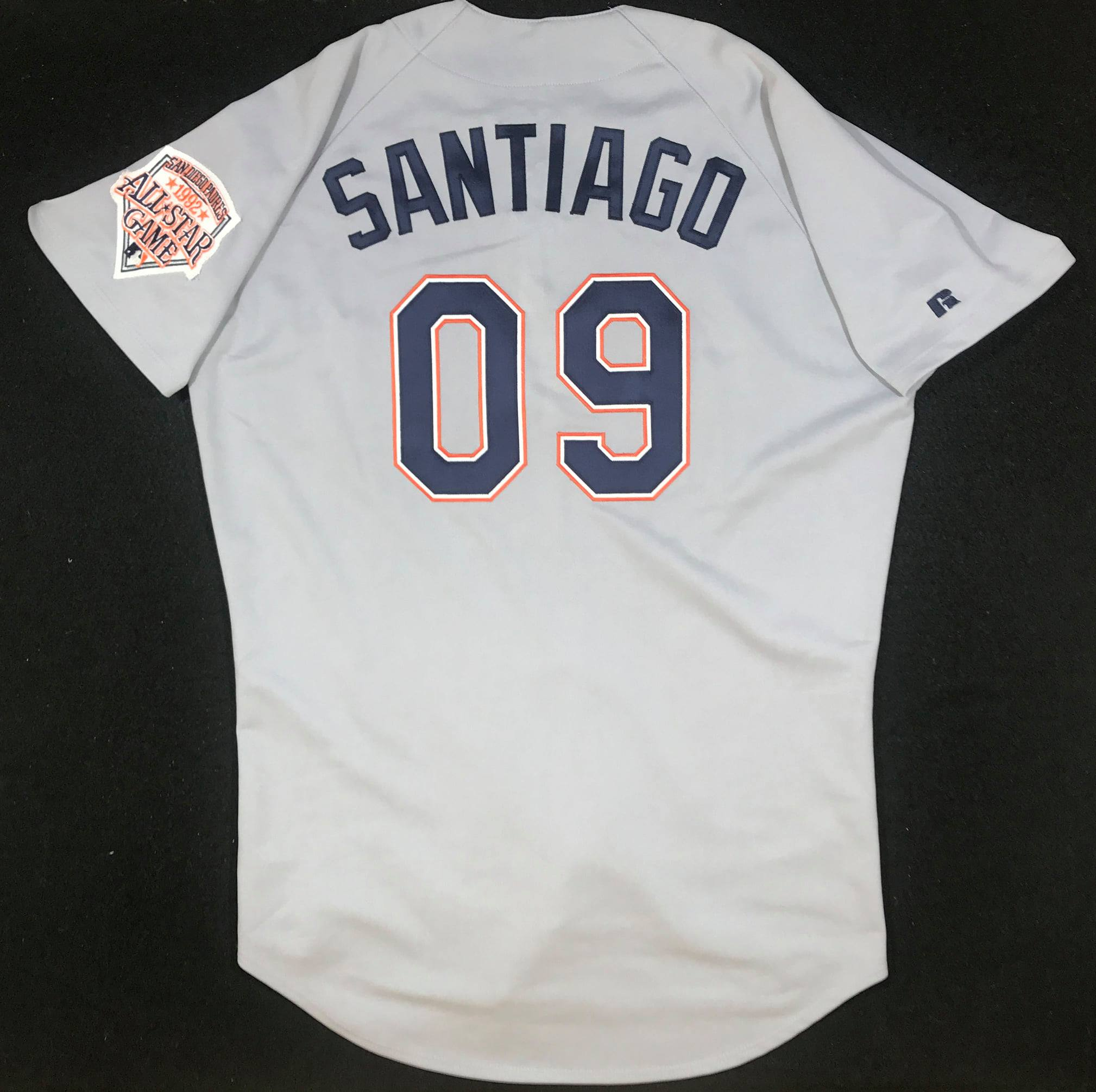
The 09 worn by catcher Benito Santiago

- Numbers 01 through 09 (with a leading zero) are some of the rarest numbers that have been worn. Catcher Benito Santiago wore 09 for the San Diego Padres and Florida Marlins. He did so because the chest protector strap on the back of his catching gear would otherwise run across a single digit, obscuring the numeral, along with its thicker material layered with the strap and latch irritating him physically.
- In honor of Roberto Clemente, players from Puerto Rico generally do not wear number 21. However, some Puerto Ricans such as Carlos Delgado and Rubén Sierra have chosen to wear the number for the same reason.

Players in the modern game have been moving away from traditional numbering conventions. Number choices are increasingly varied. Sportswriter Paul Lukas noted that the increasing use of higher numbers in baseball could be traced to the iconic status of certain high numbers in hockey, most notably Wayne Gretzky's 99 and Mario Lemieux's 66. As of August 2019, nearly four times as many players had worn 99 in the 21st century (15) than in all of the 20th century (4), and nearly as many players had worn 0 in the 21st century (10) as in the 20th (11). Every two-digit number has been worn during a regular-season MLB game, with number 89 the last to be used—it was first worn during 2020, by Miguel Yajure of the Yankees. In 2024, every jersey number between 00 and 99 (aside from Jackie Robinson's retired 42) was used during the season for the first time.

== Attachments and oddities ==
If a player who grows superstitious about or emotionally attached to a certain number changes teams, he will occasionally bargain for the right to wear the number if it is already in use on his new team. In 1993, when Rickey Henderson joined the Toronto Blue Jays, he paid Turner Ward $25,000 for the number 24, which he wore at various points throughout his career. Before the 2005 season, upon joining the Atlanta Braves for a second stint, Brian Jordan gave third base coach Fredi González a Harley Davidson motorcycle in exchange for number 33, while Juan Pierre bought a motorcycle for manager Grady Little in exchange for the number 9 on the Los Angeles Dodgers in 2007. In a less lucrative transaction, when Mitch Williams joined the Philadelphia Phillies in 1991, he bought number 28 from John Kruk for $10 and two cases of beer.

Some players who are unable to acquire the number they had on their previous team will obtain a similar number. For example, Roger Clemens wore number 21 for over 15 years while pitching for the University of Texas, the Boston Red Sox, and the Blue Jays. When he joined the New York Yankees prior to the 1999 season, Clemens asked long-time Yankee outfielder Paul O'Neill to surrender the number. O'Neill refused, so Clemens chose number 12, the reverse of 21, then settled on number 22, which he wore for the remainder of his career. After a stint with his hometown Houston Astros, Clemens resigned with the Yankees for the 2007 season, prompting Robinson Canó to change numbers from 22 to 24 in anticipation of the signing.

Pitcher Joe Beimel wore number 97 throughout his career because his first child was born in 1997. During the 2006 season, while playing for the Red Sox, J. T. Snow wore number 84 to honor his father Jack, a former National Football League wide receiver who had died earlier in the year.

For some players, an oddity or coincidence has provided an opportunity to express something about themselves with their number. In 1951, while playing for the minor-league Fargo-Moorhead Twins, Johnny Neves wore the number 7 backwards on his jersey because "Neves" is "seven" spelled backwards. Bill Voiselle, who had grown up in Ninety Six, South Carolina, wore number 96 from 1947 to 1950 to honor his hometown. At the time, this was by far the highest number ever worn in Major League Baseball, and Voiselle had to seek special league permission in order to wear it. Carlos May, who was born on May 17, wore number 17, meaning that his jersey read both his name and number and his birthday ("May 17"). Eddie Gaedel, a little person who made one plate appearance for the St. Louis Browns as a publicity stunt in 1951, wore the number 1/8.

== Retired numbers ==
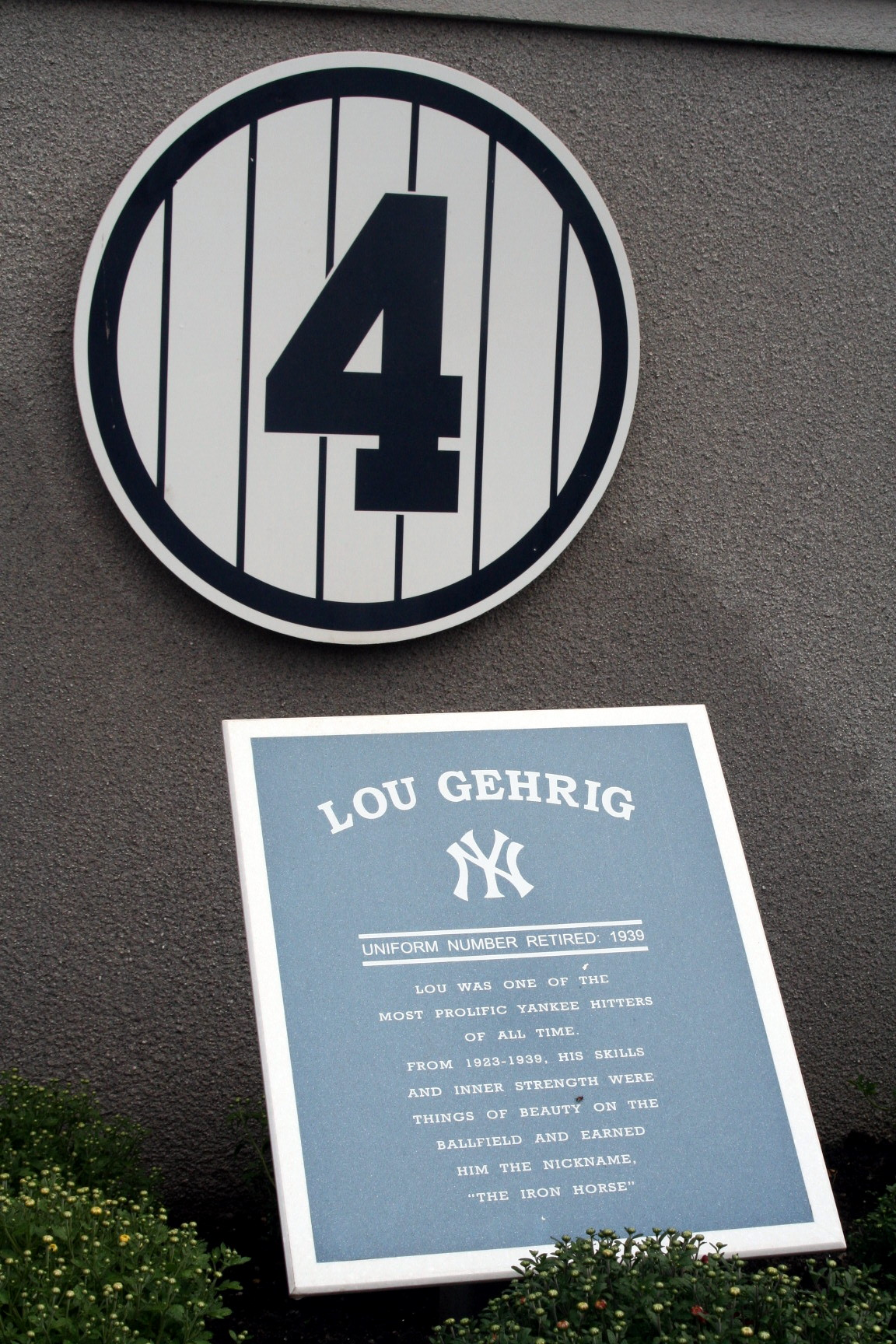
In 1939, Lou Gehrig's #4 (here displayed at Yankee Stadium) became the first number to be retired in the history of the MLB

Players, managers, coaches, or other figures with notable contributions to a given team will sometimes have their uniform number retired such that the number is never reissued by that team. Only the individual with the retired number can wear that number upon a potential return to that team. Generally, such retirements are reserved for those individuals whose performance and impact were notable not just to a single team, but to Major League Baseball as a whole.

The first MLB number retired was Lou Gehrig's #4 by the New York Yankees. A retirement ceremony was held in his honor at Yankee Stadium on July 4, 1939, and #4 was permanently retired six months later, on January 6, 1940.

However, Babe Ruth's famous #3 uniform remained in circulation from the day he was unconditionally released by the Bombers, February 26, 1935, until its formal retirement on June 13, 1948, when a mortally ill Ruth attended the 25th anniversary celebration of Yankee Stadium—nicknamed "The House That Ruth Built"—just 64 days prior to his death from cancer at age 53. It had been worn in the interim by seven players: George Selkirk (1935–1942), Bud Metheny (1943–1946), Roy Weatherly (1946), Eddie Bockman (1946), Frank Colman (1946–1947), Allie Clark (1947), and Cliff Mapes (1948), with rookie outfielder Mapes switching jerseys to #13 for the remainder of 1948.

As of 2024, MLB has seen at least one number retirement in each season since 1982. #20 has been retired by 11 teams, more than any other number (excluding Jackie Robinson's #42, which has been retired by all teams). The lowest positive number not retired by any team is 38, while the highest player uniform number to be retired is Carlton Fisk's #72, which he wore with the Chicago White Sox. Two numbers higher than 72 have been retired. The St. Louis Cardinals retired #85 in honor of their then-owner August Busch Jr. in 1984, with that number chosen to signify his age at the time of its retirement. The Cleveland Guardians (then Indians) retired #455 in 2001 to honor their fans and commemorate the then-MLB record home sellout streak of 455 games. (Note: MLB does not allow any team to issue three-digit uniform numbers.)

Ten players (Note: Hank Aaron, Wade Boggs, Rod Carew, Rollie Fingers, Carlton Fisk, Roy Halladay, Gil Hodges, Reggie Jackson, Greg Maddux, and Willie Mays) and two managers (Note: Sparky Anderson and Casey Stengel) have had their numbers retired with two teams. Ralph Kiner had his number retired for his contributions as a player for the Pittsburgh Pirates and as a broadcaster for the New York Mets. (Note: As a broadcaster, Kiner did not wear a uniform and is instead honored with a plaque displaying a microphone stylized identically to a retired number plaque.) Frank Robinson's #20 is retired by three teams: the Orioles and Reds for his contributions as a player and the Guardians for his contributions as a player and manager. (Note: Robinson also coached for and managed the Orioles, but his number was retired by the team before his tenure.) Nolan Ryan had two different numbers (#30 and #34) retired among three teams: the Angels, Rangers, and Astros. The other individuals to have multiple numbers retired are Sparky Anderson (#10 with the Reds and #11 with the Tigers), Wade Boggs (#12 with the Rays and #26 with the Red Sox), Carlton Fisk (#27 with the Red Sox and #72 with the White Sox), Roy Halladay (#32 with the Blue Jays and #34 with the Phillies), and Reggie Jackson (#9 with the Athletics and #44 with the Yankees).

The Yankees have retired more numbers than any other team (22 numbers honoring 23 of their former players, plus #42 for Jackie Robinson, who did not play for the team), including all non-zero single digit numbers. The Miami Marlins are the only team with no retired numbers as of September 2024, however, the team has retired and unretired the #5. It was initially retired in 1993 in honor of Carl Barger, who had died in December 1992. Barger was the president of the then-expansion franchise and thus never wore a number for the team. The number, initially chosen because it had been worn by Joe DiMaggio, Barger's favorite player, was returned to circulation in 2012 when the Marlins moved into their current stadium. Instead of a retired number, a plaque honoring Barger was placed at the new stadium. The #5 was also unretired by the Cincinnati Reds, who initially retired it to honor Willard Hershberger, an active player who committed suicide in 1940, but placed it back into circulation at the end of the season. The number was later permanently retired by the team to honor the contributions of Johnny Bench.

In 2021, after Roberto Alomar was banned from baseball following an independent investigation into allegations of sexual misconduct, the Toronto Blue Jays announced that he would be removed from their Level of Excellence and that his retired number banner would be taken down. Alomar's #12 was unretired upon being assigned to Jordan Hicks during the 2023 season.

The only other cases of retired numbers being returned to circulation by an MLB franchise occurred when the Montreal Expos moved to Washington, D.C. and became the Washington Nationals. At the time, the Expos had retired three numbers to honor four former players. (Note: Gary Carter (#8), Andre Dawson (#10), Rusty Staub (#10), and Tim Raines (#30)) All were returned to circulation by the Nationals.

=== Jackie Robinson and number 42 ===
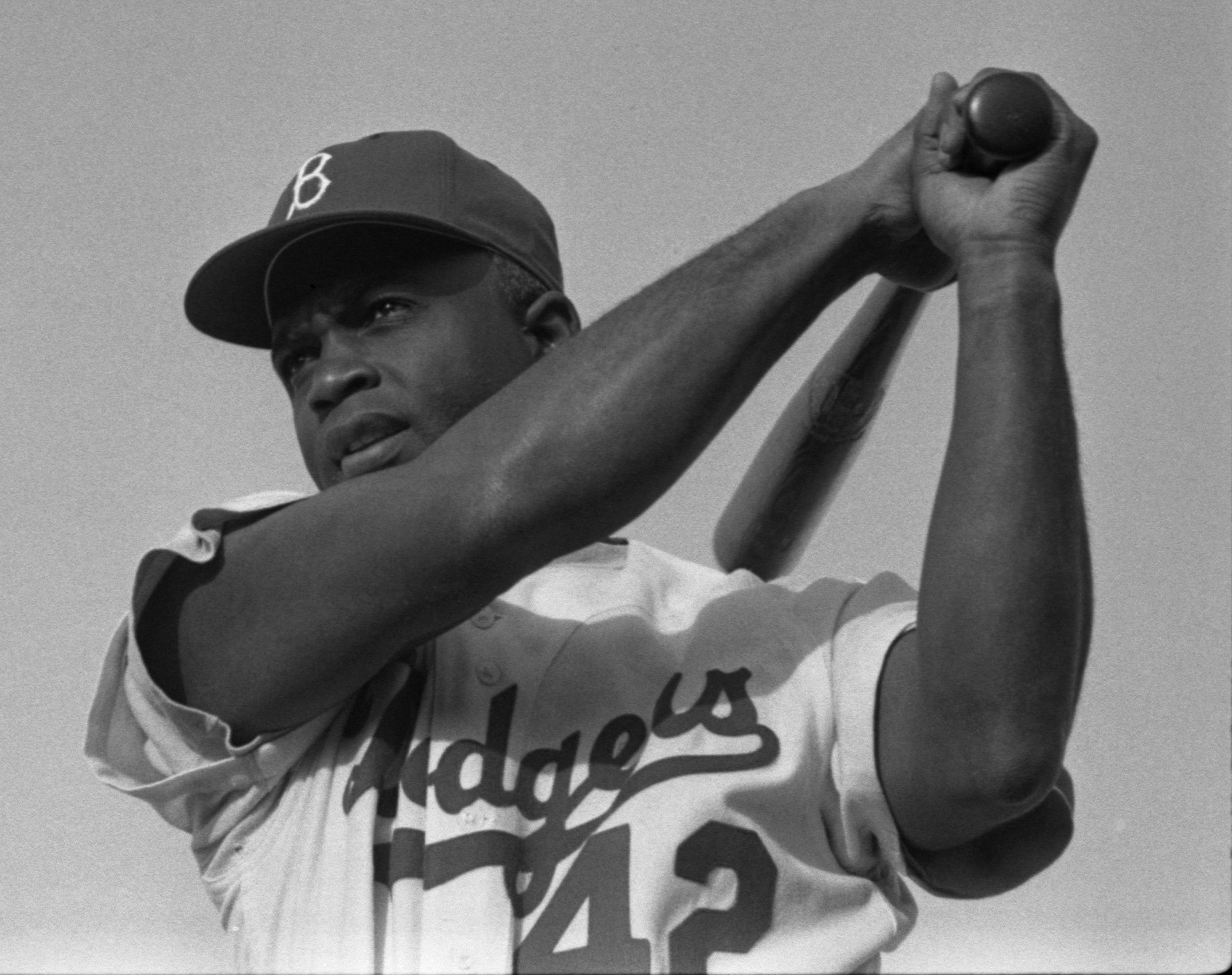
Jackie Robinson of the Brooklyn Dodgers wearing a uniform with his distinctive #42 in 1954

In 1997, for the first and thus far only time, a number was retired throughout Major and Minor League Baseball. The #42 cannot be issued by any team, having been retired in honor of Jackie Robinson. (Note: The Los Angeles Dodgers, for whom Robinson played (as a Brooklyn Dodger), had already retired the number in 1972, four months before Robinson's death.) Those wearing the number upon its league-wide retirement, such as Mo Vaughn of the Boston Red Sox and Butch Huskey of the New York Mets, were allowed to keep it under a grandfather clause. The last person to wear #42 in the Major Leagues was Mariano Rivera of the New York Yankees, who retired following the 2013 season; the last person to wear #42 in Minor League Baseball was Art Silber, owner of and occasional coach for the Potomac Nationals until his retirement from coaching in 2012.

However, the #42 would be worn by several players other than Rivera in 2007, which marked the 60th anniversary of Robinson's first MLB appearance (an event that broke the sport's 20th-century color line). Before the season, then-Cincinnati Reds outfielder Ken Griffey Jr. asked Robinson's widow, Rachel Robinson, and MLB Commissioner Bud Selig for permission to wear #42 on April 15, the anniversary date of Robinson's historic game, which was formally named Jackie Robinson Day by MLB in 2004. Both gave their approval, and Selig later allowed any player to wear #42 on Jackie Robinson Day. In response, over 200 players elected to do so, including six teams that opted for all of their players to participate. Since 2009, all players and coaches on all teams, as well as all umpires, have worn #42 on Jackie Robinson Day.

== Umpires ==
In 1970, National League umpires first wore identifying numbers on the right sleeve of their shirt or coat. The numbers were assigned in alphabetical order and remained this way through 1978, meaning umpires could, and often did, wear a different number from year to year. In 1979, NL umpires chose numbers based upon seniority, and that system remained through 1999, the last season of separate umpiring staffs for the National and American Leagues.

American League umpires did not wear identifying numbers until 1980. Unlike the NL, there were no set rules for number assignments.

When the AL and NL umpiring staffs merged in 2000, the senior umpire who wore a given number could keep that number, while the junior umpire had to select a new number.

Since 2020, MLB has allowed three-digit numbers on umpires, but the procedure applies to reserve umpires (call-up umpires when regular umpires are on vacation).
