= Carle Illinois College of Medicine =

Medical school of the University of Illinois Urbana-Champaign

Coordinates: 40°06′30.0″N 88°13′45.3″W

- Established: March 12, 2015
- Parent institution: University of Illinois Urbana-Champaign
- Dean: Mark S. Cohen
- Location: Urbana, Illinois, United States
- Website: medicine.illinois.edu

The Carle Illinois College of Medicine is the medical school of the University of Illinois Urbana-Champaign.

== History ==
The Carle Illinois College of Medicine was established on March 12, 2015, after the University of Illinois Board of Trustees approved the creation of the new college. The college welcomed its inaugural class of 32 students on July 2, 2018. The engineering-based college of medicine currently offers an M.D. degree focused at the intersection of medicine and engineering.

The college also offers an MD/PhD program. All degrees earned at the Carle Illinois College of Medicine will be awarded by the University of Illinois at Urbana-Champaign. In November 2015, it was announced that the University of Illinois and Carle Foundation Hospital had signed a 10-year research affiliation agreement with the intent to encourage and enable new biomedical advances at the newly formed college of medicine. Dr. Rashid Bashir and Dr. Robert Good were selected as co-chairs for the Core Curriculum Group committee charged with designing the curriculum for the college. Dr. Bashir was hired as the executive associate dean of the college in September 2017. In August 2016, King Li was named the first Dean of the college of medicine.

In July 2015, a key milestone was achieved with the University of Illinois Board of Trustees approving the definitive agreement between Carle and University of Illinois at Urbana-Champaign. On November 3, 2015, the first major step toward naming the Carle Illinois College of Medicine's founding dean began with the naming of a diverse 17-member committee to initiate the dean search. This became the first new college at University of Illinois at Urbana-Champaign since 1957.

Carle Illinois College of Medicine is fully accredited by the LCME.

The program received preliminary accreditation on October 10, 2017, and received full accreditation in March, 2025.

The other medical school in the University of Illinois system is the University of Illinois College of Medicine. The University of Illinois College of Medicine had a regional campus in Urbana-Champaign for over 40 years, and was the primary site for the school's MSTP program. However, after 2022, Carle Illinois is the only College of Medicine on the Urbana-Champaign campus, with degrees being awarded from the University of Illinois at Urbana-Champaign, not the UI Chicago campus. The final class of University of Illinois College of Medicine students graduated in 2022, the same year the first Carle Illinois students completed their degrees.

== Admissions ==
Carle Illinois uses a two-round, rolling admissions process. As of January 2019, the college only accepts applications from United States citizens or permanent residents who will have completed a bachelor's, master's or doctorate degree, in any field, from a U.S. or Canadian accredited college or university prior to enrollment. An MCAT score of at least 498 is required to apply. Carle Illinois considers applications on a holistic basis. Thus, there is no minimum GPA requirement, letters of recommendation are required as part of the application, and the college suggests that their applicants have strong backgrounds in biology, chemistry/biochemistry, mathematics/statistics, physics and social sciences. Upon review of the first round of applications, based on the criteria above, select applicants are invited to submit a second-round application. Admissions offers are given from the pool of submissions of successful second-round applications. Carle Illinois does not conduct interviews as part of the application process, as is traditional for some other medical schools.

The inaugural class of the Carle Illinois College of Medicine consisted of a group of 32 candidates, with 16 men and 16 women, averaging approximately 26 years of age. All of the students of the college's inaugural class received full, four-year privately funded scholarships, valued at approximately $250,000 each.

== Research ==
=== Research Advisory Board ===
Carle Illinois has two Research Advisory Boards: External and Internal. The external Research Advisory Board is composed of professors and doctors from colleges, universities and hospitals all across the country, while the internal board is composed of professors from various colleges at the University of Illinois, directors and other individuals from research labs across campus, and doctors from Carle Foundation Hospital.

=== Research mentors ===
The students also have the opportunity to work closely with research mentors, researchers and professors from departments and colleges across the university.

=== Health Maker Lab ===
The Health Maker Lab hosts an annual “Health Make-a-thon" competition in which students, community members, and citizen scientists submit their ideas on how to improve the human condition. Winners of the competition receive $10,000 in idea support to the Health Maker Lab network and mentorship from University of Illinois experts to further build their ideas. All Illinois citizens are eligible to participate.

== Student life ==
Carle Illinois offers a wellness program. Carle Illinois students also have access to the university-wide resources available at the University of Illinois at Urbana-Champaign.

== See also ==
- Harvard–MIT Division of Health Sciences and Technology
- University of Illinois at Urbana-Champaign College of Engineering
