= University of Illinois College of Medicine =

American multi-campus Chicago-based body

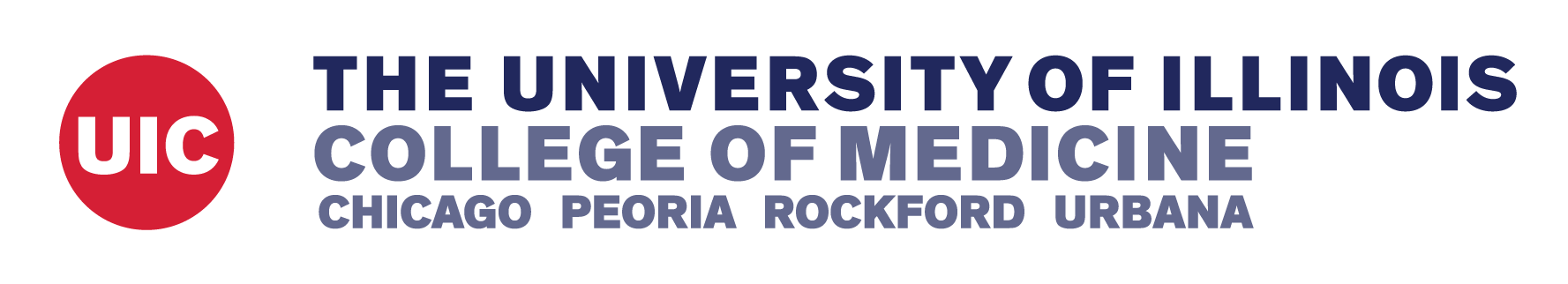
- Former names: College of Physicians and Surgeons of Chicago
- Type: Public
- Established: September 26, 1882
- Parent institution: University of Illinois Chicago
- Dean: Mark I. Rosenblatt
- Location: Primary campus in Chicago, with satellite campuses in Rockford and Peoria, Illinois, United States
- Campus: Urban (Chicago and Peoria) Suburban (Rockford)
- Website: www.medicine.uic.edu

The University of Illinois College of Medicine is the medical school of the University of Illinois Chicago.

The school offers a four-year program leading to the MD degree at four different sites in Illinois: Chicago, Peoria, Rockford, and formerly Urbana–Champaign. The Urbana–Champaign site stopped accepting new students after fall 2016 to make room for the newly established Carle Illinois College of Medicine.

In 2011, enrollment of medical students in the University of Illinois system totaled 1,290 according to the Association of American Medical Colleges.

== History ==
The College of Medicine, originally an independent institution, opened on September 26, 1882, as the College of Physicians and Surgeons of Chicago (P&S), with 100 students and a faculty of 30. Five years later, the Board of Trustees of the University of Illinois approved a contract of affiliation whereby the university would lease P&S as its Department of Medicine. The arrangement continued until 1912, when there was a nine-month hiatus in the affiliation owing to a lack of legislative support. It was only after the faculty and alumni of P&S bought up all shares of the school's stock and presented them to the Board of Trustees as a gift that the school officially became the College of Medicine of the University of Illinois in March 1913.

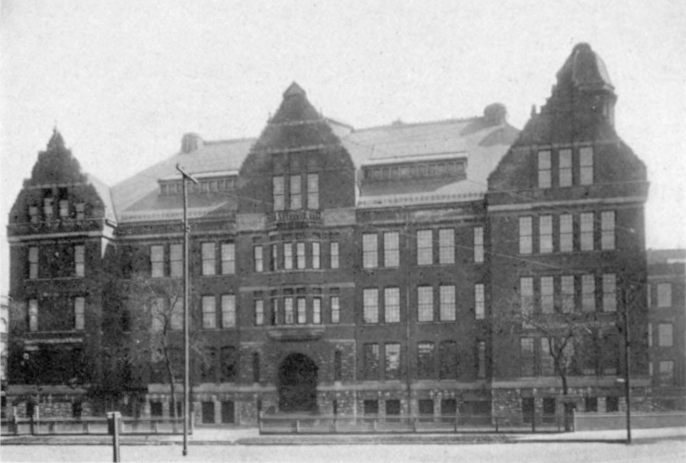
Building at Congress and Honoré Streets, Chicago in 1922

In the late 1800s, although six medical schools were already in existence, five physicians—Charles Warrington Earle, Abraham Reeves Jackson, Daniel Atkinson King Steele, Samuel McWilliams and Leonard St. John—decided to open their own proprietary medical school. They pooled together $5,541.78, purchased a piece of land and secured a certificate of incorporation. The new school, located on Harrison and Honore streets, was named the College of Physicians and Surgeons of Chicago (commonly referred to as P&S). Its doors opened on September 26, 1882, with a class of 100 students and a faculty of 30 physicians.

At the West Side Free Dispensary, located on the first floor of the medical school, students in small groups could observe pathological cases and their treatment. Patients were classified according to the affected area or system of the body: heart, lungs, eyes, ears, skin or nervous system. The dispensary also furnished material for college clinics in medicine, surgery, gynecology, obstetrics, ophthalmology, neurology and pediatrics. In its first three years, the dispensary registered 20,353 patients and dispensed 17,347 prescriptions. In 1913, after years of negotiations, the P&S faculty and alumni donated stock to the University of Illinois Board of Trustees to establish the University of Illinois College of Medicine. In 1970, the Illinois legislature voted to expand the college to three additional sites: Peoria, Rockford and Urbana. Their purpose was to provide access to care for all citizens in the state and increase opportunities for Illinois residents to attend medical school.

In 1902, National Medical Honor Society Alpha Omega Alpha (ΑΩΑ) was founded at the Chicago College of Physician and Surgeons (later named the College of Medicine of the University of Illinois) by medical student William Root and colleagues. Today, ΑΩΑ has 135 Chapters in medical schools across the country, and more than 200,000 members, including 55 Nobel Prize winners in physiology, medicine, and chemistry, and more than 75 percent of medical school deans.

== Present status ==
The College of Medicine has a faculty of approximately 4,000 across the four sites.

The surrounding health science center, of which the University of Illinois College of Medicine is a part, also comprises the University of Illinois Medical Center, the colleges of Nursing, Pharmacy, Dentistry, and Applied Health Sciences, and the School of Public Health.

== Campuses ==
=== Chicago Campus ===
The campus is located in the Illinois Medical District in Chicago, which includes four major hospitals. Students begin clinical training in the first year, accompanying physicians on rounds and learning to take patient histories. Fifty-three residency programs are available.

In addition to serving as the Chicago program site, the Chicago campus of the College of Medicine is the administrative home for the dean and all other college-wide officers. Located on the Near West Side, the college is part of the University of Illinois Medical Center, which includes the colleges of Applied Health Sciences, Dentistry, Nursing, Pharmacy, and the School of Public Health.

The College of Medicine's Chicago campus sits on a plot of land once occupied by West Side Park, the former home of the Chicago Cubs.

=== Peoria Campus ===
In Peoria, first through fourth-year students get clinical experience at Methodist Medical Center of Illinois, OSF Saint Francis Medical Center, Children's Hospital of Illinois – the largest pediatric hospital in central Illinois - Pekin Hospital, and Proctor Community Hospital.

=== Rockford Campus ===
The Rockford campus includes the Center for Rural Health Professions, which works to improve health and healthcare in rural communities. Rockford teaches first through fourth year medical students and offers a family medicine residency program. This campus was originally a tuberculosis sanitarium built in 1916.

=== Urbana Campus ===
This campus closed in 2022 to make room for the Carle Illinois College of Medicine. This extension is on the Urbana-Champaign campus of the University of Illinois and offers student education and research opportunities that includes collaboration with colleagues across campus. Urbana also hosts the dual-degree Medical Scholars Program.

== Curriculum ==
The College of Medicine offers a Doctor of Medicine degree program (M.D.), a Doctor of Philosophy (Ph.D.) degree program in the medical sciences, and three joint degree programs: MD/PhD, MD/MPH, and MD/MBA. Other advanced degree programs in the medical sciences include a master of science degree in medical biotechnology (MBT; Rockford), a master of science in medical physiology (MSMP, Chicago), a master of health professions education degree (MHPE; Chicago/online), and a master of science degree in patient safety leadership (MPSL; online).

== Reputation and rankings ==
Among the school's alumni are: U.S. Representative James A. McDermott, 1963, and Olga Jonasson, 1958, a pioneer in kidney transplantation.

- 1 in 6 Illinois physicians are trained at the University of Illinois
- UI College of Medicine is ranked #25 by the NIH ranking based on amount of funding.
- UI College of Medicine is currently ranked #55 among research based medical schools in the 2021 edition of U.S. News & World Report.
- UI College of medicine ranks #1 for Hispanic graduates and #5 for African American graduates according to the "Top 100 Producers" ranking for 2008, Diverse Issues in Higher Education.
- UI College of Medicine is ranked #2 in the nation for enrollment of Hispanic medical students according to the "Top 25 Medical School Enrolling Hispanics" ranking.
- UI College of Medicine is currently ranked within the "top 10 medical schools for Hispanic students" by the Hispanic Business Magazine 2013.
- UI College of Medicine is currently the third largest medical school in the country. Its 1,351 students hail from a wide variety of cultural and economic backgrounds serving as a vast network of future leaders in health care and medicine.
- 75 residencies are available in a wide variety of fields on the four campuses. From emergency medicine in Chicago to family practice in Peoria, internal medicine in Urbana, and rural medicine in Rockford, students can choose from a wide variety of specialties.
- The college's faculty conducts groundbreaking research in many fields. Advancements include the development of a vaccine against prostate cancer, transplantation of pancreatic islet cells to cure Type I diabetes and more.

== Notable alumni ==
- Isabella Garnett (MD 1901) – Founder and superintendent of Community Hospital of Evanston, the first hospital in the city of Evanston, Illinois to serve African-American patients.
- Julius B. Richmond (MD 1939) – United States Surgeon General (1977–1981). Founder of the Head Start Program, Professor, Harvard Medical School. Harvard School of Public Health highest honor (Julius B. Richmond Award) is named for him.
- Arno Motulsky (MD 1947) – Geneticist, Founder of the field of medical genetics, regarded as the father of pharmacogenetics. Founding member of the National Academy of Medicine.
- Emil J. Freireich (MD 1949) – Hematologist/Oncologist, pioneer in the treatment of cancer and use of chemotherapy, often known as the father of modern leukemia therapy. Key contributor to development of MD Anderson Cancer Center.
- W. Dudley Johnson (MD 1955) – Cardiac surgeon known as the father of coronary artery bypass surgery
- Charles Hirsch (MD 1958) – Chief Medical Examiner for Office of Chief Medical Examiner of the City of New York from 1989–2013.
- Olga Jonasson (MD 1958) – Chief of surgery at Cook County Hospital (1977); first woman to chair an academic department of surgery (Ohio State University, 1987), performed first kidney transplant in state of Illinois (1969)
- David Sackett (MD 1960) – Epidemiologist, developed the first department of clinical epidemiology and biostatistics in the world, regarded as the father of evidence-based medicine and one of the 3 fathers of modern clinical epidemiology.
- Riad Barmada (MD 1963) – Head of orthopedics at University of Illinois at Chicago College of Medicine (1984–1998), pioneer in the use of cemented and ceramic total hip replacements.
- Jim McDermott (MD 1963) – U.S. Representative (D-WA) (1989–2016)
- Donald Jensen (MD 1972) – Hepatitis C researcher, clinician, and Richard B. Capps Chair Emeritus, Rush University Medical Center.
- Allan Friedman (MD 1974) – Neurosurgeon and Chairman emeritus of Neurological Surgery at Duke University (1996–2014), President of Society of Neurological Surgeons (2010–2011), recipient of AANS Cushing Medal (2021) the most prestigious award in Neurological Surgery.
- Georges C. Benjamin (MD 1978) – Executive director of the American Public Health Association
- Robin Horsager-Boehrer (MD 1987) – Luis Leib, M.D. Professor and Chief in Obstetrics & Gynecology at University of Texas Southwestern Medical Center.
- Larry Bucshon (MD 1988) – US Representative (R-IN) (2011–2025), Cardiothoracic surgeon.

== Notable faculty ==
- Nathaniel Oglesby Calloway, Professor – First African American to receive their PhD from an institute west of the Mississippi River
- Vincent Du Vigneaud, Professor, 1929–1932 (Urbana) – Nobel prize recipient (Chemistry, 1955) for his work on biochemically important sulphur compounds and the first synthesis of a polypeptide hormone.
- Adolf Wallenberg, Lecturer, 1944–1949 (Chicago) – Pioneer in Neurology, first to clinically describe occlusions of the arteria cerebelli posterior inferior (Wallenberg's syndrome).
- Ananda Chakrabarty, Professor, 1979–2020 (Chicago) – Development and patent of a genetically engineered Pseudomonas bacterium
- Paul Lauterbur, Professor, 1985–1990 (Chicago), 1985–2007 (Urbana-Champaign) – Nobel Prize in Physiology or Medicine in 2003 for development of MRI
- Ruy Lourenco, Professor, 1970–1989 (Chicago), Chair emeritus of Department of Medicine at University of Illinois (1977–1989), Dean emeritus of Rutgers New Jersey Medical School, Rutgers Center for Emerging Pathogens named in his honor.
- Rachelle Yarros, Professor, 1895–1927 (Chicago) – Obstetrician/Gynecologist and pioneer in women's reproductive rights, contributor to foundation of American Social Hygiene Association.

== See also ==
- University of Illinois Hospital & Health Sciences System
