= Statue of Sandy Koufax =

Sculpture in Los Angeles, California, U.S.

Coordinates: 34°4′29.9″N 118°14′21.2″W

Sandy Koufax Monument
- Artist: Branly Cadet
- Year: 2022
- Medium: Bronze sculpture
- Subject: Sandy Koufax
- Location: Dodger Stadium Los Angeles, California, U.S.
- Website: branlycadet.com

The Sandy Koufax Monument was unveiled outside the centerfield plaza entrance of Dodger Stadium on June 18, 2022. The bronze statue, created by sculptor Branly Cadet, commemorates Dodgers and baseball great Sandy Koufax.

A Hall of Fame pitcher for the Brooklyn / Los Angeles Dodgers from 1955 to 1966, Koufax is widely considered to be one of the greatest pitchers of all-time and as well as the greatest pitcher in Dodgers franchise history.

== Background ==
In 2019, as part of renovation plans, the Los Angeles Dodgers announced that they would unveil a statue of Sandy Koufax in the centerfield plaza of Dodger Stadium. It was the second statue dedicated by the Dodgers after the statue of Jackie Robinson was unveiled in 2017.

Dodgers' president Stan Kasten stated that the newly renovated centerfield plaza would have an entrance gate and the plan was that Robinson statue (moved from its original location to the centerfield plaze) and the Koufax statue were to be on opposite sides of the entrance, to "greet" fans as they entered the stadium.

The statue was initially meant to be unveiled in 2020 but the plans were delayed due to the COVID-19 pandemic.

The ceremony of the statue unveiling was led by Dodgers broadcaster Charley Steiner with three other people speaking about Koufax: former Dodgers manager and close friend Joe Torre, Dodgers pitcher Clayton Kershaw, and Dodgers owner and chairman Mark Walter. Koufax himself gave a speech in which he thanked numerous former teammates, coaches, team personnel, and friends.

== Description ==
The sculpture was created by artist Branly Cadet who had also created the statue of Jackie Robinson for the Dodgers in 2017.

It depicts Koufax's signature leg kick as he prepares to throw and also shows Koufax determined and a picture of calm as he goes into his windup. Cadet stated, "I think for me more than anything I wanted to capture his strength, his focus and integrity. Although he's a very quiet and absolute gentleman, there's a part of him that's just a fierce competitor."

Koufax picked the inspiration image for the statue and also gripped a baseball for a photograph of his left hand in order to depict it as accurately as possible.

The quote on the base of the statue, by Koufax, says: "As teammates, we were bound together by a single interest and common goal. To win. Nothing else mattered and nothing else would do."

=== Inscription ===
SANDY KOUFAX
BROOKLYN & LOS ANGELES DODGERS: 1955–1966

Among the most dominating pitchers in the game's history, left-hander Sandy Koufax won 165 games and compiled 2,396 strikeouts in 2,324.1 innings with 40 shutouts in his 12 year Dodger career (1955-1966). In 1966, Koufax earned his third Cy Young Award, becoming the first three-time winner in an era when the honor was given to just one MLB pitcher per season. Koufax led the National League in ERA five straight seasons from 1962-66, was the strikeouts leader four times and was tops in wins on three occasions with totals of 27, 26 and 25. In addition he pitched a National League record four no-hitters, including a perfect game in 1965, and set the National League single season mark with 382 strikeouts in 1965. He is one of the very few pitchers to have more strikeouts than career innings pitched.
