= Jackie Robinson =

American baseball player (1919–1972)

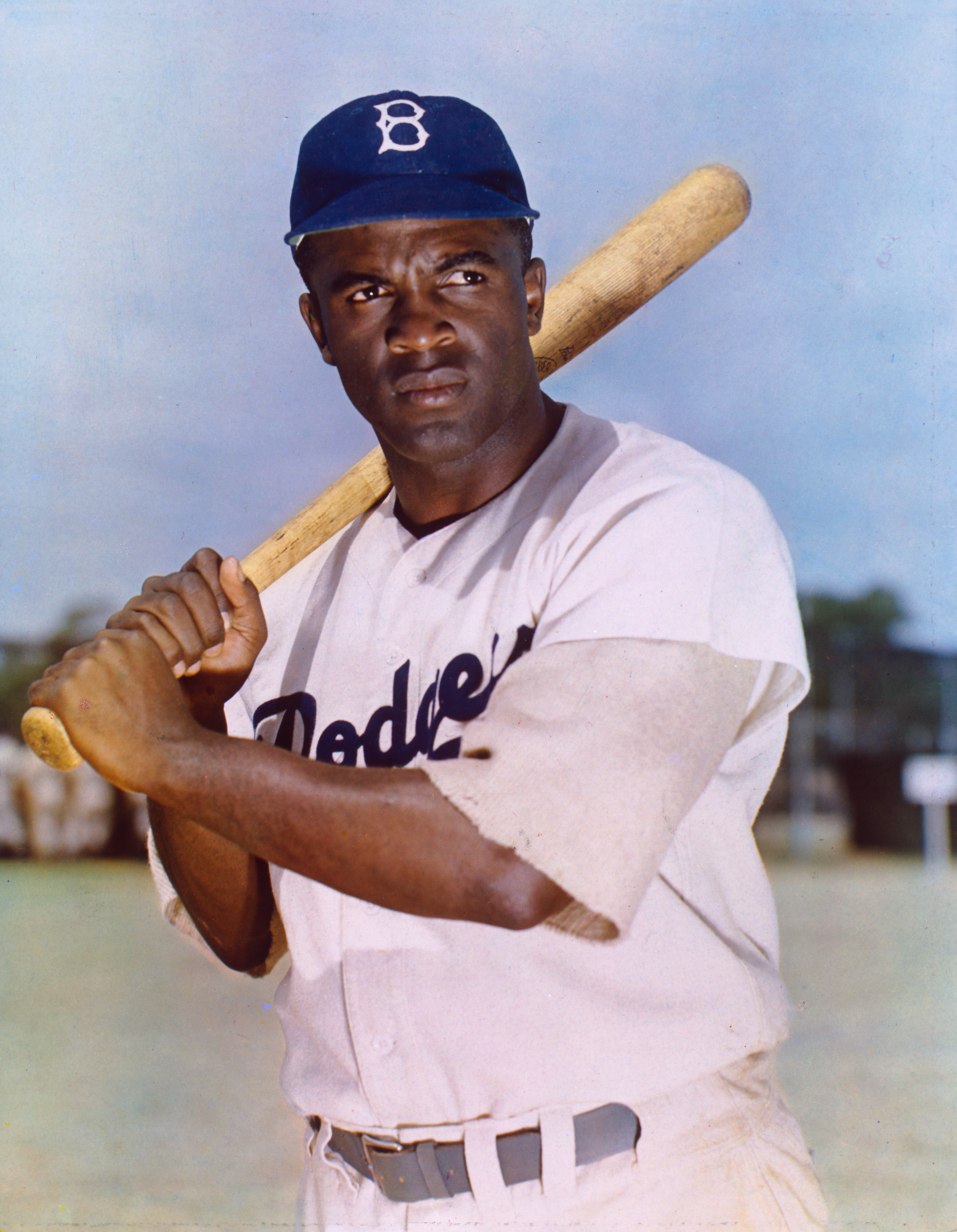
- Robinson with the Brooklyn Dodgers in 1949
- Second baseman
- Born: January 31, 1919; Cairo, Georgia, U.S.
- Died: October 24, 1972 (aged 53); Stamford, Connecticut, U.S.
- Batted: Right Threw: Right

Professional debut
- NgL: 1945, for the Kansas City Monarchs
- MLB: April 15, 1947, for the Brooklyn Dodgers

Last MLB appearance
- October 10, 1956, for the Brooklyn Dodgers

MLB statistics
- Batting average: .313
- Home runs: 141
- Runs batted in: 761
- Stats at Baseball Reference

Teams
- Kansas City Monarchs (1945); Brooklyn Dodgers (1947–1956)

Career highlights and awards
- NgL All-Star (1945); 6× All-Star (1949–1954); World Series champion (1955); NL MVP (1949); Rookie of the Year (1947); NL batting champion (1949); NAL home run leader (1945); 2× NL stolen base leader (1947, 1949); Los Angeles Dodgers No. 42 retired; No. 42 retired by all MLB teams; Monument Park honoree; Major League Baseball All-Century Team

Member of the National

Baseball Hall of Fame
- Induction: 1962
- Vote: 77.5% (first ballot)
Spouse	Rachel Isum (m. 1946)
Signature

Jack Roosevelt Robinson (January 31, 1919 – October 24, 1972) was an American professional baseball player who was the first African American to play in Major League Baseball (MLB) in the modern era. Robinson broke the color line when he started at first base for the Brooklyn Dodgers on April 15, 1947. The Dodgers signing Robinson heralded the end of racial segregation in professional baseball, which had relegated black players to the Negro leagues since the 1880s.

Born in Cairo, Georgia, Robinson was raised in Pasadena, California. A four-sport student athlete at Pasadena Junior College and the University of California, Los Angeles, he was better known for football than he was for baseball, becoming a star with the UCLA Bruins football team. Following his college career, Robinson was drafted for service during World War II, but was court-martialed for refusing to sit at the back of a segregated Army bus, eventually being honorably discharged. Afterwards, he signed with the Kansas City Monarchs of the Negro leagues, where he caught the eye of Branch Rickey, general manager of the Brooklyn Dodgers, who thought he would be the perfect candidate for breaking the MLB color line.

During his 10-year MLB career, Robinson won the inaugural Rookie of the Year Award in 1947, was an All-Star for six consecutive seasons from 1949 through 1954, and won the National League (NL) Most Valuable Player Award in 1949—the first Black player so honored. Robinson played in six World Series and contributed to the Dodgers' 1955 World Series championship. He was inducted into the Baseball Hall of Fame in 1962 in his first year of eligibility.

Robinson's character, his use of nonviolence, and his talent challenged the traditional basis of segregation that had then marked many other aspects of American life. He influenced the culture of and contributed significantly to the civil rights movement. Robinson also was the first Black television analyst in MLB and the first Black vice president of a major American corporation, Chock full o'Nuts. In the 1960s, he helped establish the Freedom National Bank, a Black American-owned financial institution based in Harlem, New York. After his death in 1972, Robinson was posthumously awarded the Congressional Gold Medal and Presidential Medal of Freedom in recognition of his achievements on and off the field. In 1997, MLB retired his uniform number, 42, across all Major League teams; he was the first professional athlete in any sport to be so honored. MLB also adopted a new annual tradition, "Jackie Robinson Day", for the first time on April 15, 2004, on which every player on every team wears the number 42.

== Early life ==
=== Family and personal life ===
Jack Roosevelt Robinson was born on January 31, 1919, into a family of sharecroppers in Cairo, Georgia. He was the youngest of five children born to Mallie (née McGriff) and Jerry Robinson, after siblings Edgar, Frank, Matthew (nicknamed "Mack"), and Willa Mae. His middle name honored former President Theodore Roosevelt, who died 25 days before Robinson was born. After Robinson's father left the family in 1920, they moved to Pasadena, California.

The extended Robinson family established itself on a residential plot containing two small houses at 121 Pepper Street in Pasadena. Robinson's mother worked various odd jobs to support the family. Growing up in relative poverty in an otherwise affluent community, Robinson and his minority friends were excluded from many recreational opportunities. As a result, Robinson joined a neighborhood gang, but his friend Carl Anderson persuaded him to abandon it.

=== John Muir High School ===
In 1935, Robinson graduated from Washington Junior High School and enrolled at John Muir Technical High School. Recognizing his athletic talents, Robinson's older brothers, Frank and Mack (himself an accomplished track and field athlete and silver medalist behind Jesse Owens in the 200 meters at the Berlin 1936 Summer Olympics) inspired Jackie to pursue his interest in sports.

At Muir Tech, Robinson played numerous sports at the varsity level and lettered in four of them: football, basketball, track and field, and baseball. He played shortstop and catcher on the baseball team, quarterback on the football team, and guard on the basketball team. With the track and field squad, he won awards in the broad jump. He was also a member of the tennis team.

In 1936, Robinson won the junior boys singles championship in the annual Pacific Coast Negro Tennis Tournament and earned a place on the Pomona annual baseball tournament all-star team, which included future Hall of Famers Ted Williams and Bob Lemon. In late January 1937, the Pasadena Star-News newspaper reported that Robinson "for two years has been the outstanding athlete at Muir, starring in football, basketball, track, baseball, and tennis."

== College career ==
After Muir, Robinson attended Pasadena Junior College (PJC), where he continued his athletic career by participating in basketball, football, baseball, and track. On the football team, he played quarterback and safety. He was a shortstop and leadoff hitter for the baseball team, and he broke an American junior college broad-jump record held by his brother Mack with a jump of 25 ft. 6 1/2 in. on May 7, 1938. As at Muir High School, most of Jackie's teammates were white. While playing football at PJC, Robinson suffered a fractured ankle, complications from which would eventually delay his deployment status while in the military. In 1938, he was elected to the All-Southland Junior College Team for baseball and selected as the region's Most Valuable Player.

That year, Robinson was one of 10 students named to the school's Order of the Mast and Dagger (Omicron Mu Delta), awarded to students performing "outstanding service to the school and whose scholastic and citizenship record is worthy of recognition." Also while at PJC, he was elected to the Lancers, a student-run police organization responsible for patrolling various school activities.

An incident at PJC illustrated Robinson's impatience with authority figures he perceived as racist, a character trait that would resurface repeatedly in his life. On January 25, 1938, he was arrested after vocally disputing the detention of a black friend by police. Robinson received a two-year suspended sentence, but the incident—‌along with other rumored run-ins between Robinson and police—‌gave Robinson a reputation for combativeness in the face of racial antagonism. While at PJC, he was motivated by a preacher (the Rev. Karl Downs) to attend church on a regular basis, and Downs became a confidant for Robinson, a Christian. Toward the end of his PJC tenure, Frank Robinson (to whom Robinson felt closest among his three brothers) was killed in a motorcycle accident. The event motivated Jackie to pursue his athletic career at the nearby University of California, Los Angeles (UCLA), where he could remain closer to Frank's family.

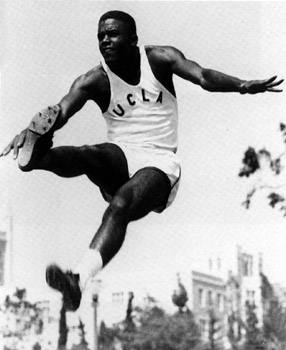
Robinson doing the long jump for UCLA

After graduating from PJC in spring 1939, Robinson enrolled at UCLA, where he became the school's first athlete to win varsity letters in four sports: baseball, basketball, football, and track.

Robinson was one of four black players on the Bruins' 1939 football team; the others were Woody Strode, Kenny Washington, and Ray Bartlett. Washington, Strode, and Robinson made up three of the team's four backfield players. At a time when only a few black students played mainstream college football, this made UCLA college football's most integrated team. They went undefeated with four ties at 6–0–4. Robinson finished the season with 12.2 yards per attempt on 42 carries, which is the school football record for highest rushing yards per carry in a season as of 2026. Robinson also led the NCAA in punt return average in the 1939 and 1940 seasons.

In track and field, Robinson won the 1940 NCAA championship in the long jump at 24 ft 10 1/4 in (7.58 m). Baseball was Robinson's "worst sport" at UCLA; he hit .097 in his only season, although in his first game he went 4-for-4 and twice stole home.

While a senior at UCLA, Robinson met his future wife, Rachel Isum (born 1922), a UCLA freshman who was familiar with Robinson's athletic career at PJC. He played football as a senior, but the 1940 Bruins won only one game. In the spring, Robinson left college just shy of graduation, despite the reservations of his mother and Isum. He took a job as an assistant athletic director with the government's National Youth Administration (NYA) in Atascadero, California.

After the government ceased NYA operations, Robinson traveled to Honolulu in the fall of 1941 to play football for the semi-professional, racially integrated Honolulu Bears. After a short season, Robinson returned to California in December 1941 to pursue a career as running back for the Los Angeles Bulldogs of the Pacific Coast Football League. By that time, however, the Japanese attack on Pearl Harbor had taken place, which drew the United States into World War II and ended Robinson's nascent football career.

== Military career ==
Jackie Robinson
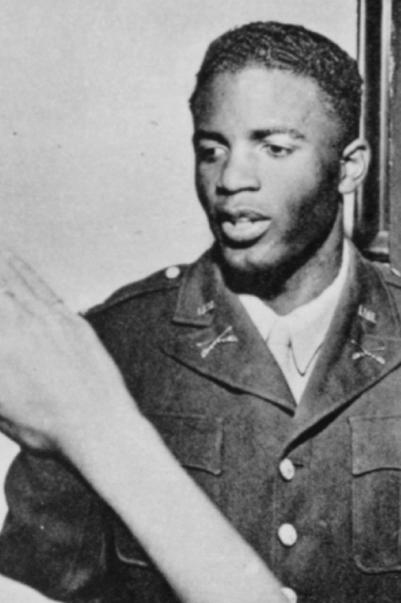
- Robinson, wearing his Army uniform, receives a military salute from his nephew Frank during a visit to his home in Pasadena, California, c. 1943
- Military career
- Allegiance: United States
- Branch: United States Army
- Service years: 1942–1944
- Rank: Second lieutenant
- Unit: 761st Tank Battalion

In 1942, Robinson was drafted and assigned to a segregated Army cavalry unit at Fort Riley, Kansas. Having the requisite qualifications, Robinson and several other black soldiers applied for admission to an Officer Candidate School (OCS) then located at Fort Riley.

Although the Army's initial July 1941 guidelines for OCS had been drafted as race-neutral, few black applicants were admitted into OCS until after subsequent directives by Army leadership. The applications of Robinson and his colleagues were delayed for several months. After protests by heavyweight boxing champion Joe Louis (then stationed at Fort Riley) and with the help of Truman Gibson (then an assistant civilian aide to the Secretary of War), the men were accepted into OCS. The experience led to a personal friendship between Robinson and Louis. Upon finishing OCS, Robinson was commissioned as a second lieutenant in January 1943. Shortly afterward, Robinson and Isum were formally engaged.

After receiving his commission, Robinson was reassigned to Fort Hood, Texas, where he joined the 761st "Black Panthers" Tank Battalion. While at Fort Hood, Robinson often used his weekend leave to visit the Rev. Karl Downs, President of Sam Huston College (now Huston–Tillotson University) in nearby Austin, Texas; in California, Downs had been Robinson's pastor at Scott United Methodist Church while Robinson attended PJC.

An event on July 6, 1944, derailed Robinson's military career. While awaiting results of hospital tests on the ankle he had injured in junior college, Robinson boarded an Army bus with a fellow officer's wife; although the Army had commissioned its own unsegregated bus line, the bus driver ordered Robinson to move to the back of the bus. Robinson refused. The driver backed down, but after reaching the end of the line, summoned the military police, who took Robinson into custody. When Robinson later confronted the investigating duty officer about racist questioning by the officer and his assistant, the officer recommended Robinson be court-martialed.

After Robinson's commander in the 761st, Paul L. Bates, refused to authorize the legal action, Robinson was summarily transferred to the 758th Battalion—where the commander quickly consented to charge Robinson with multiple offenses, including, among other charges, public drunkenness, even though Robinson did not drink.

By the time of the court-martial in August 1944, the charges against Robinson had been reduced to two counts of insubordination during questioning. Robinson was acquitted by an all-white panel of nine officers.

Although his former unit, the 761st Tank Battalion, became the first black tank unit to see combat in World War II, Robinson's court-martial proceedings prohibited him from being deployed overseas, and he was never in combat.

After his acquittal, he was transferred to Camp Breckinridge, Kentucky, where he served as a coach for army athletics until receiving an honorable discharge in November 1944. While there, Robinson met a former player for the Kansas City Monarchs of the Negro American League, who encouraged Robinson to write the Monarchs and ask for a tryout. Robinson took the former player's advice and wrote to Monarchs co-owner Thomas Baird.

== Post-military ==
After his discharge, Robinson briefly returned to his old football club, the Los Angeles Bulldogs. Robinson then accepted an offer from his old friend and pastor Rev. Karl Downs to be the athletic director at Samuel Huston College in Austin, then of the Southwestern Athletic Conference. The job included coaching the school's basketball team for the 1944–45 season. As it was a fledgling program, few students tried out for the basketball team, and Robinson even resorted to inserting himself into the lineup for exhibition games. Although his teams were outmatched by opponents, Robinson was respected as a disciplinarian coach, and drew the admiration of, among others, Langston University basketball player Marques Haynes, a future member of the Harlem Globetrotters.

== Professional career ==
=== Negro leagues and major league prospects ===
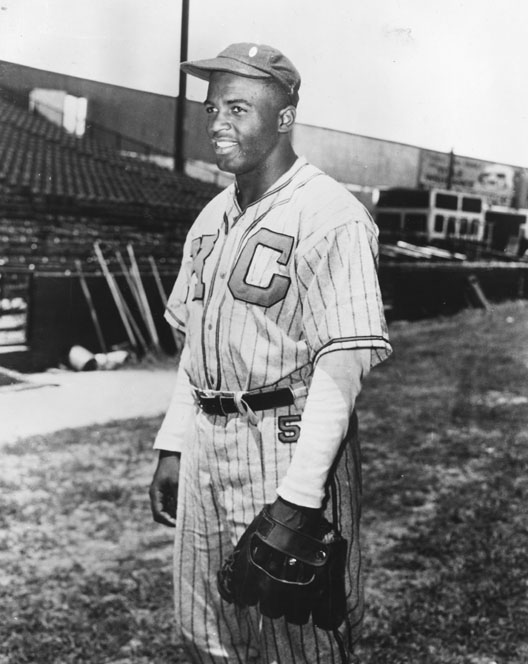
Robinson during his stint in the Negro leagues with the Kansas City Monarchs

In early 1945, while Robinson was at Sam Huston College, the Kansas City Monarchs sent him a written offer to play professional baseball in the Negro leagues. Robinson accepted a contract for $400 per month (equivalent to about $7,200 per month today). Although he played well for the Monarchs, Robinson was frustrated with the experience. He had grown used to a structured playing environment in college, and the Negro leagues' disorganization and embrace of gambling interests appalled him. The hectic travel schedule also placed a burden on his relationship with Isum, with whom he could now communicate only by letter. In all, Robinson played 47 games at shortstop for the Monarchs, hitting .387 with five home runs, and registering 13 stolen bases. He also appeared in the 1945 East–West All-Star Game, going hitless in five at-bats.

During the season, Robinson pursued potential major league interests. No black man had played in the major leagues since Moses Fleetwood Walker in 1884, but the Boston Red Sox nevertheless held a tryout at Fenway Park for Robinson and other black players on April 16. The tryout, however, was a farce chiefly designed to assuage the desegregationist sensibilities of powerful Boston City Councilman Isadore H. Y. Muchnick. Even with the stands limited to management, Robinson was subjected to racial epithets. He left the tryout humiliated, and more than 14 years later, in July 1959, the Red Sox became the final major league team to integrate its roster.

Other teams, however, had more serious interest in signing a black ballplayer. In the mid-1940s, Branch Rickey, club president and general manager of the Brooklyn Dodgers, began to scout the Negro leagues for a possible addition to the Dodgers' roster. Rickey selected Robinson from a list of promising black players and interviewed him for possible assignment to Brooklyn's International League farm club, the Montreal Royals. Rickey was especially interested in making sure his eventual signee could withstand the inevitable racial abuse that would be directed at him. In a famous three-hour exchange on August 28, 1945, Rickey asked Robinson if he could face the racial animus without taking the bait and reacting angrily—‌a concern given Robinson's prior arguments with law enforcement officials at PJC and in the military. Robinson was aghast: "Are you looking for a Negro who is afraid to fight back?" Rickey replied that he needed a Negro player "with guts enough not to fight back." After obtaining a commitment from Robinson to "turn the other cheek" to racial antagonism, Rickey agreed to sign him to a contract for $600 per month (equivalent to about $10,700 per month today). Rickey did not offer compensation to the Monarchs, instead believing all Negro league players were free agents due to the contracts not containing a reserve clause. Among those with whom Rickey discussed prospects was Wendell Smith, writer for the black weekly Pittsburgh Courier, who, according to Cleveland Indians owner and team president Bill Veeck, "influenced Rickey to take Jack Robinson, for which he's never completely gotten credit."

Although he required Robinson to keep the arrangement a secret for the time being, Rickey committed to formally signing Robinson before November 1, 1945. On October 23, it was publicly announced that Robinson would be assigned to the Royals for the 1946 season. On the same day, with representatives of the Royals and Dodgers present, Robinson formally signed his contract with the Royals. In what was later referred to as "The Noble Experiment", Robinson was the first black baseball player in the International League since the 1880s. He was not necessarily the best player in the Negro leagues, and black talents Satchel Paige and Josh Gibson were upset when Robinson was selected first. Larry Doby, who broke the color line in the American League the same year as Robinson, said, "One of the things that was disappointing and disheartening to a lot of the black players at the time was that Jack was not the best player. The best was Josh Gibson. I think that's one of the reasons why Josh died so early—he was heartbroken."

Rickey's offer allowed Robinson to leave behind the Monarchs and their grueling bus rides, and he went home to Pasadena. That September, he signed with Chet Brewer's Kansas City Royals, a post-season barnstorming team in the California Winter League. Later that off-season, he briefly toured South America with another barnstorming team, while his fiancée Isum pursued nursing opportunities in New York City. On February 10, 1946, Robinson and Isum were married by their old friend, the Rev. Karl Downs.

=== Minor leagues ===
In 1946, Robinson arrived at Daytona Beach, Florida, for spring training with the Montreal Royals of the Class AAA International League. Clay Hopper, the manager of the Royals, asked Rickey to assign Robinson to any other Dodgers affiliate, but Rickey refused.

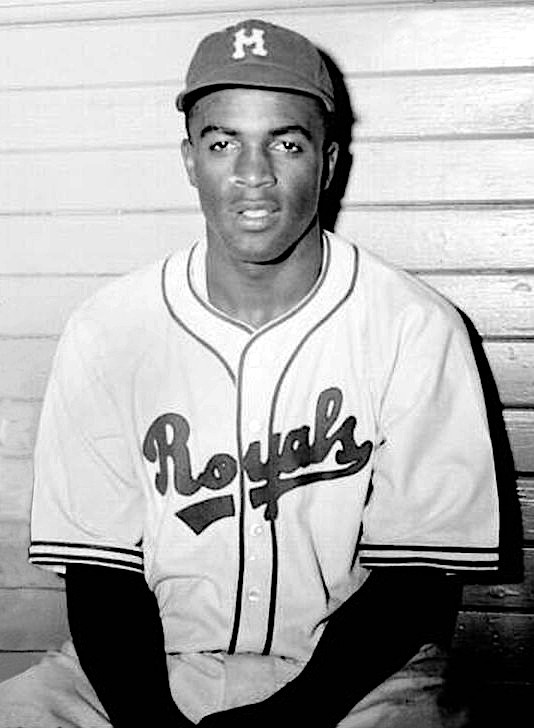
Robinson with the Montreal Royals in July 1946, the year before he was called up to the majors

Robinson's presence was controversial in racially segregated Florida. He was not allowed to stay with his white teammates at the team hotel, and instead lodged at the home of Joe and Dufferin Harris, a politically active African-American couple who introduced the Robinsons to civil rights activist Mary McLeod Bethune. Since the Dodgers organization did not own a spring training facility, scheduling was subject to the whim of area localities, several of which turned down any event involving Robinson or Johnny Wright, another black player whom Rickey had signed to the Dodgers' organization in January. In Sanford, Florida, the police chief threatened to cancel games if Robinson and Wright did not cease training activities there; as a result, Robinson was sent back to Daytona Beach. In Jacksonville, the stadium was padlocked shut without warning on game day, by order of the city's Parks and Public Property director. In DeLand, a scheduled day game was postponed, ostensibly because of issues with the stadium's electrical lighting.

After much lobbying of local officials by Rickey himself, the Royals were allowed to host a game involving Robinson in Daytona Beach. Robinson made his Royals debut at Daytona Beach's City Island Ballpark on March 17, 1946, in an exhibition game against the team's parent club, the Dodgers. Robinson thus became the first black player to openly play for a minor league team against a major league team since the de facto baseball color line had been implemented in the 1880s.

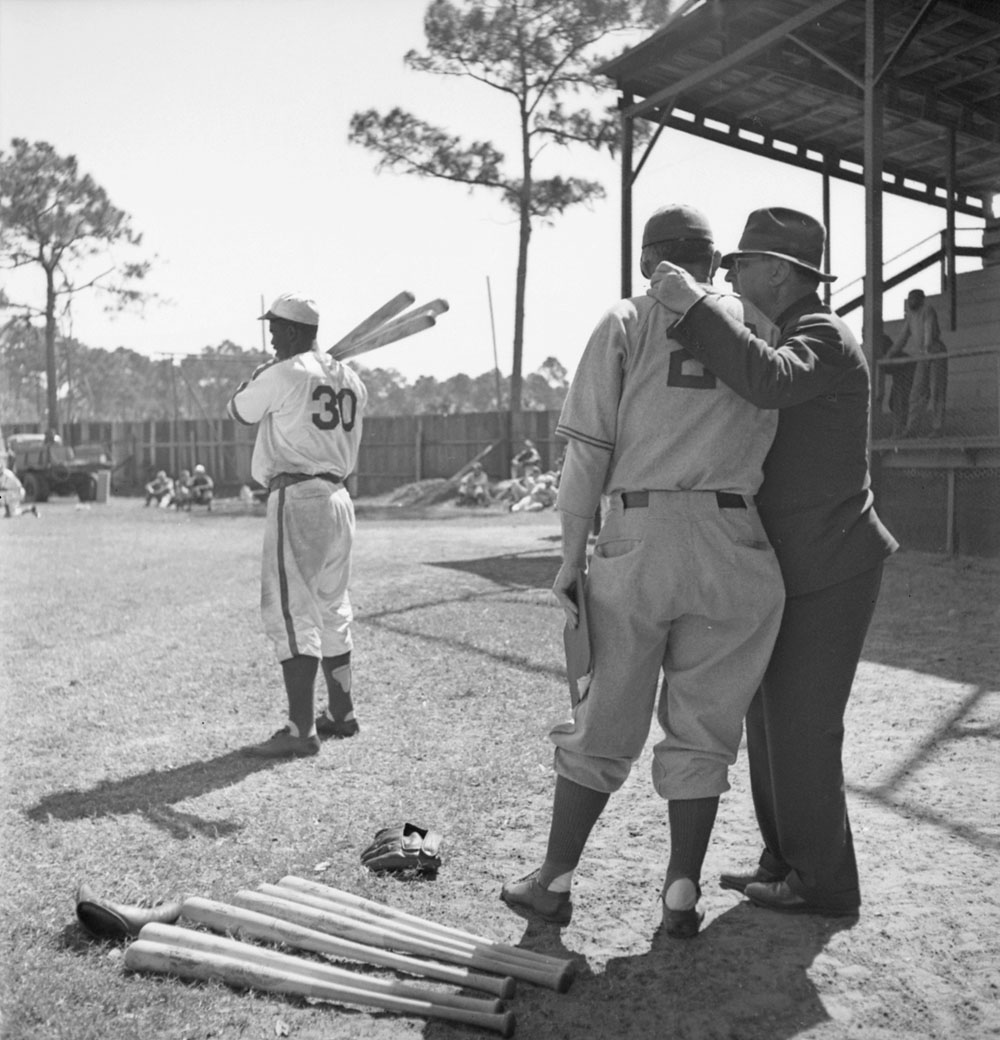
Robinson (holding bats) playing in Montreal

Later in spring training, after some less-than-stellar performances, Robinson was shifted from shortstop to second base, allowing him to make shorter throws to first base. Robinson's performance soon rebounded. On April 18, 1946, Roosevelt Stadium hosted the Jersey City Giants' season opener against the Montreal Royals, marking the professional debut of the Royals' Jackie Robinson and the first time the color barrier had been broken in a game between two minor league clubs. Pitching against Robinson was Warren Sandel who had played against him when they both lived in California. During Robinson's first at bat, the Jersey City catcher, Dick Bouknight, demanded that Sandel throw at Robinson, but Sandel refused. Although Sandel induced Robinson to ground out at his first at bat, Robinson ended up with four hits in his five at bats; his first hit was a three-run home run in the game's third inning. He also scored four runs, drove in three, and stole two bases in the Royals' 14–1 victory. Robinson proceeded to lead the International League that season with a .349 batting average and .985 fielding percentage, and he was named the league's Most Valuable Player. Although he often faced hostility while on road trips (the Royals were forced to cancel a Southern exhibition tour, for example), in Canada, the Montreal fan base enthusiastically supported Robinson. Whether fans supported or opposed it, Robinson's presence on the field was a boon to attendance; more than one million people went to games involving Robinson in 1946, an astounding figure by International League standards. In the fall of 1946, following the baseball season, Robinson returned home to California and briefly played professional basketball for the short-lived Los Angeles Red Devils.

=== Brooklyn Dodgers (1947–1956) ===
==== Breaking the color barrier (1947) ====
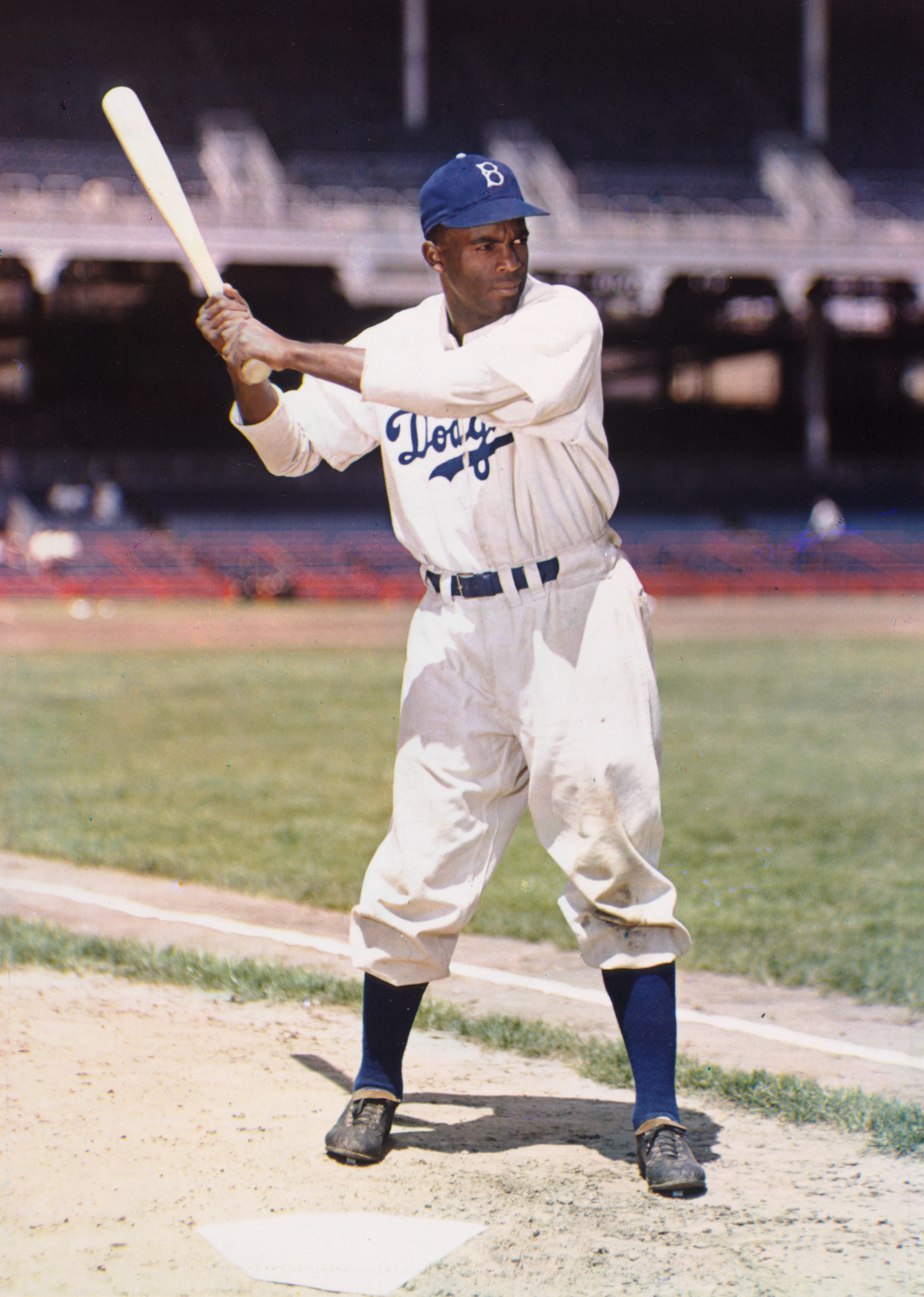
Jackie Robinson in 1947

In 1947, the Dodgers called Robinson up to the major leagues six days before the start of the season. With Eddie Stanky entrenched at second base for the Dodgers, Robinson played his initial major league season as a first baseman. Robinson made his debut as a Dodger wearing uniform number 42 on April 11, 1947, in a preseason exhibition game against the New York Yankees at Ebbets Field with 24,237 in attendance. On April 15, Robinson made his major league debut at the relatively advanced age of 28 at Ebbets Field before a crowd of 26,623 spectators, more than 14,000 of whom were black. Although he failed to get a base hit, he reached second on a throwing error and scored the winning run in the Dodgers' 5–3 victory. Robinson became the first player since 1884 to openly break the major league baseball color line. Black fans began flocking to see the Dodgers when they came to town, abandoning their Negro league teams.

Racial tension existed in the Dodgers clubhouse. Some Dodger players insinuated they would sit out rather than play alongside Robinson. The brewing mutiny ended when Dodgers management took a stand for Robinson. Manager Leo Durocher informed the team, "I do not care if the guy is yellow or black, or if he has stripes like a fuckin' zebra. I'm the manager of this team, and I say he plays. What's more, I say he can make us all rich. And if any of you cannot use the money, I will see that you are all traded."

Robinson was also derided by opposing teams. According to a press report, the St. Louis Cardinals threatened to strike if Robinson played and spread the walkout across the entire National League. Existence of the plot was said to have been leaked by the Cardinals' team physician, Robert Hyland, to a friend, the New York Herald Tribune's Rud Rennie. The reporter, concerned about protecting Hyland's anonymity and job, in turn leaked it to his Tribune colleague and editor, Stanley Woodward, whose own subsequent reporting with other sources protected Hyland. The Woodward article made national headlines. After it was published, National League President Ford Frick and Baseball Commissioner Happy Chandler let it be known that any striking players would be suspended. "You will find that the friends that you think you have in the press box will not support you, that you will be outcasts," Frick was quoted as saying. "I do not care if half the league strikes. Those who do it will encounter quick retribution. All will be suspended and I don't care if it wrecks the National League for five years. This is the United States of America and one citizen has as much right to play as another." Woodward's article received the E. P. Dutton Award in 1947 for Best Sports Reporting. The Cardinals players denied that they were planning to strike, and Woodward later told author Roger Kahn that Frick was his true source; writer Warren Corbett said that Frick's speech "never happened". Regardless, the report led to Robinson receiving increased support from the sports media. Even The Sporting News, a publication that had backed the color line, came out against the idea of a strike.

Robinson nonetheless became the target of rough physical play by opponents (particularly the Cardinals). At one time, he received a seven-inch gash in his leg from Enos Slaughter. On April 22, 1947, during a game between the Dodgers and the Philadelphia Phillies, Phillies players and manager Ben Chapman called Robinson a "nigger" from their dugout and yelled that he should "go back to the cotton fields". Rickey later recalled that Chapman "did more than anybody to unite the Dodgers. When he poured out that string of unconscionable abuse, he solidified and united thirty men."

However, Robinson received significant encouragement from several major league players. Robinson named Lee "Jeep" Handley, who played for the Phillies at the time, as the first opposing player to wish him well. Dodgers teammate Pee Wee Reese once came to Robinson's defense with the famous line, "You can hate a man for many reasons. Color is not one of them." In 1947 or 1948, Reese is said to have put his arm around Robinson in response to fans who shouted racial slurs at Robinson before a game in Boston or Cincinnati. A statue by sculptor William Behrends, unveiled at KeySpan Park on November 1, 2005, depicts Reese with his arm around Robinson. Jewish baseball star Hank Greenberg, who had to deal with ethnic epithets during his career, also encouraged Robinson. Following an incident where Greenberg collided with Robinson at first base, he "whispered a few words into Robinson's ear", which Robinson later characterized as "words of encouragement". Greenberg had advised him to overcome his critics by defeating them in games. Robinson also talked frequently with Larry Doby, who endured his own hardships since becoming the first black player in the American League with the Cleveland Indians, as the two spoke to each other via telephone throughout the season.

Robinson finished the season having played in 151 games for the Dodgers, with a batting average of .297, an on-base percentage of .383, and a .427 slugging percentage. He had 175 hits (scoring 125 runs) including 31 doubles, 5 triples, and 12 home runs, driving in 48 runs for the year. Robinson led the league in sacrifice hits, with 28, and in stolen bases, with 29. His cumulative performance earned him the inaugural Major League Baseball Rookie of the Year Award (separate National and American League Rookie of the Year honors were not awarded until 1949).

That year, the Brooklyn Dodgers won the National League pennant and went on to face the Yankees in the 1947 World Series. Robinson became the first black player to play in the World Series. He appeared in all seven games, with the Dodgers ultimately losing in Game 7.

==== MVP, Congressional testimony, and film biography (1948–1950) ====
Following Stanky's trade to the Boston Braves in March 1948, Robinson took over second base, where he logged a .980 fielding percentage that year (second in the National League at the position, fractionally behind Stanky). Robinson had a batting average of .296 and 22 stolen bases for the season. In a 12–7 win against the St. Louis Cardinals on August 29, 1948, he hit for the cycle—a home run, a triple, a double, and a single in the same game. The Dodgers briefly moved into first place in the National League in late August 1948, but they ultimately finished third as the Braves went on to win the pennant and lose to the Cleveland Indians in the World Series.

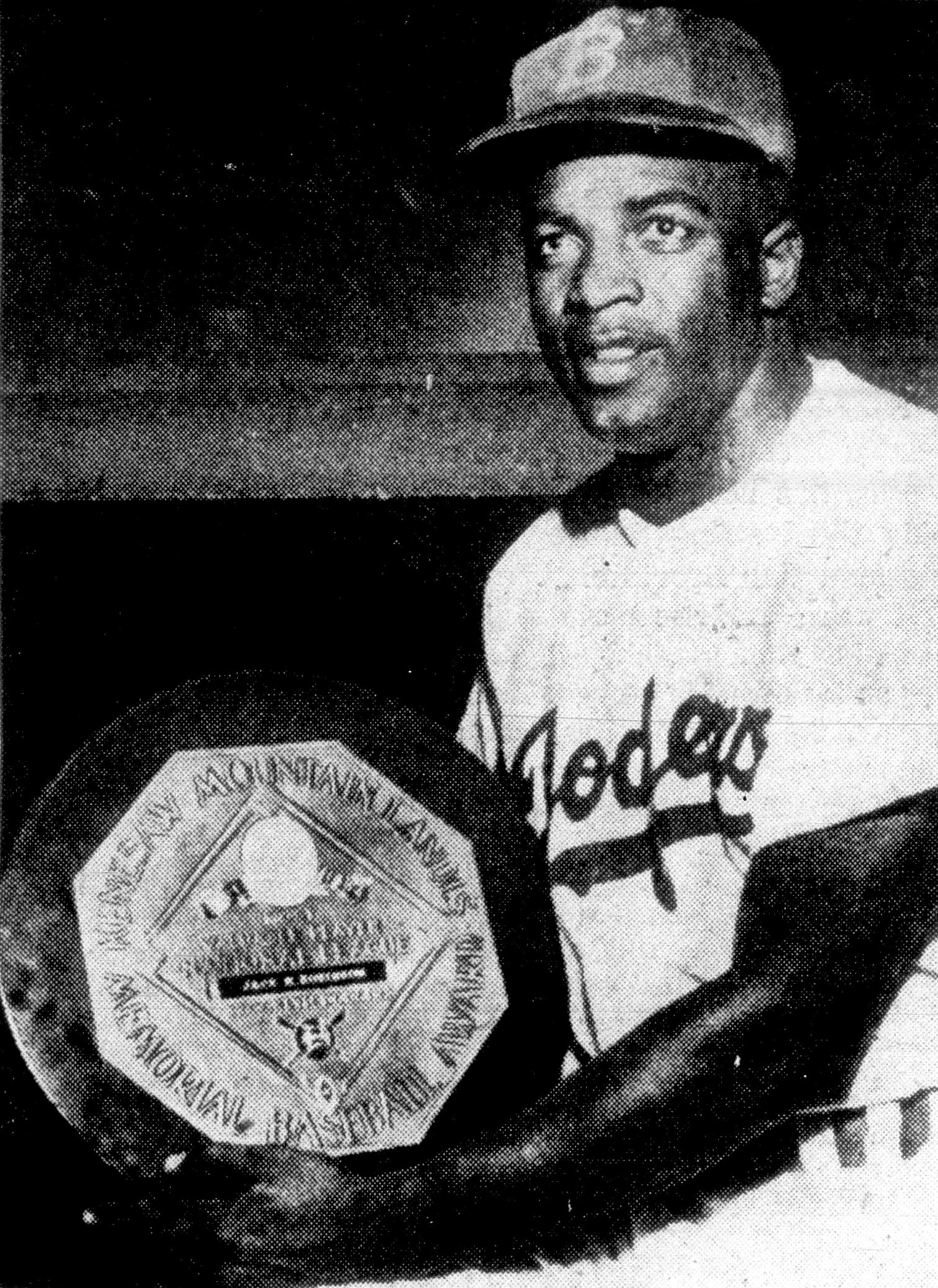
Robinson holding the 1949 National League MVP Award.

Racial pressure on Robinson eased in 1948 when a number of other black players entered the major leagues. Larry Doby (who broke the color barrier in the American League on July 5, 1947, just 11 weeks after Robinson) and Satchel Paige played for the Cleveland Indians, and the Dodgers had three other black players besides Robinson. In February 1948, he signed a $12,500 contract (equal to $167,503 today) with the Dodgers; while a significant amount, this was less than Robinson made in the off-season from a vaudeville tour, where he answered pre-set baseball questions and a speaking tour of the South. Between the tours, he underwent surgery on his right ankle. Because of his off-season activities, Robinson reported to training camp 30 pounds (14 kg) overweight. He lost the weight during training camp, but dieting left him weak at the plate. In 1948, Wendell Smith's book, Jackie Robinson: My Own Story, was released.

In the spring of 1949, Robinson turned to Hall of Famer George Sisler, working as an advisor to the Dodgers, for batting help. At Sisler's suggestion, Robinson spent hours at a batting tee, learning to hit the ball to right field. Sisler taught Robinson to anticipate a fastball, on the theory that it is easier to subsequently adjust to a slower curveball. Robinson also noted that "Sisler showed me how to stop lunging, how to check my swing until the last fraction of a second". The tutelage helped Robinson raise his batting average from .296 in 1948 to .342 in 1949. In addition to his improved batting average, Robinson stole 37 bases that season, was second place in the league for both doubles and triples, and registered 124 runs batted in with 122 runs scored. For the performance Robinson earned the Most Valuable Player Award for the National League. Baseball fans also voted Robinson as the starting second baseman for the 1949 All-Star Game—the first All-Star Game to include black players.

That year, a song about Robinson by Buddy Johnson, "Did You See Jackie Robinson Hit That Ball?", reached number 13 on the charts; Count Basie recorded a famous version. Ultimately, the Dodgers won the National League pennant, but lost in five games to the New York Yankees in the 1949 World Series.

Summer 1949 brought an unwanted distraction for Robinson. In July, he was called to testify before the United States House of Representatives' Committee on Un-American Activities (HUAC) concerning statements made that April by black athlete and actor Paul Robeson. Robinson was reluctant to testify, but he eventually agreed to do so, fearing it might negatively affect his career if he declined.

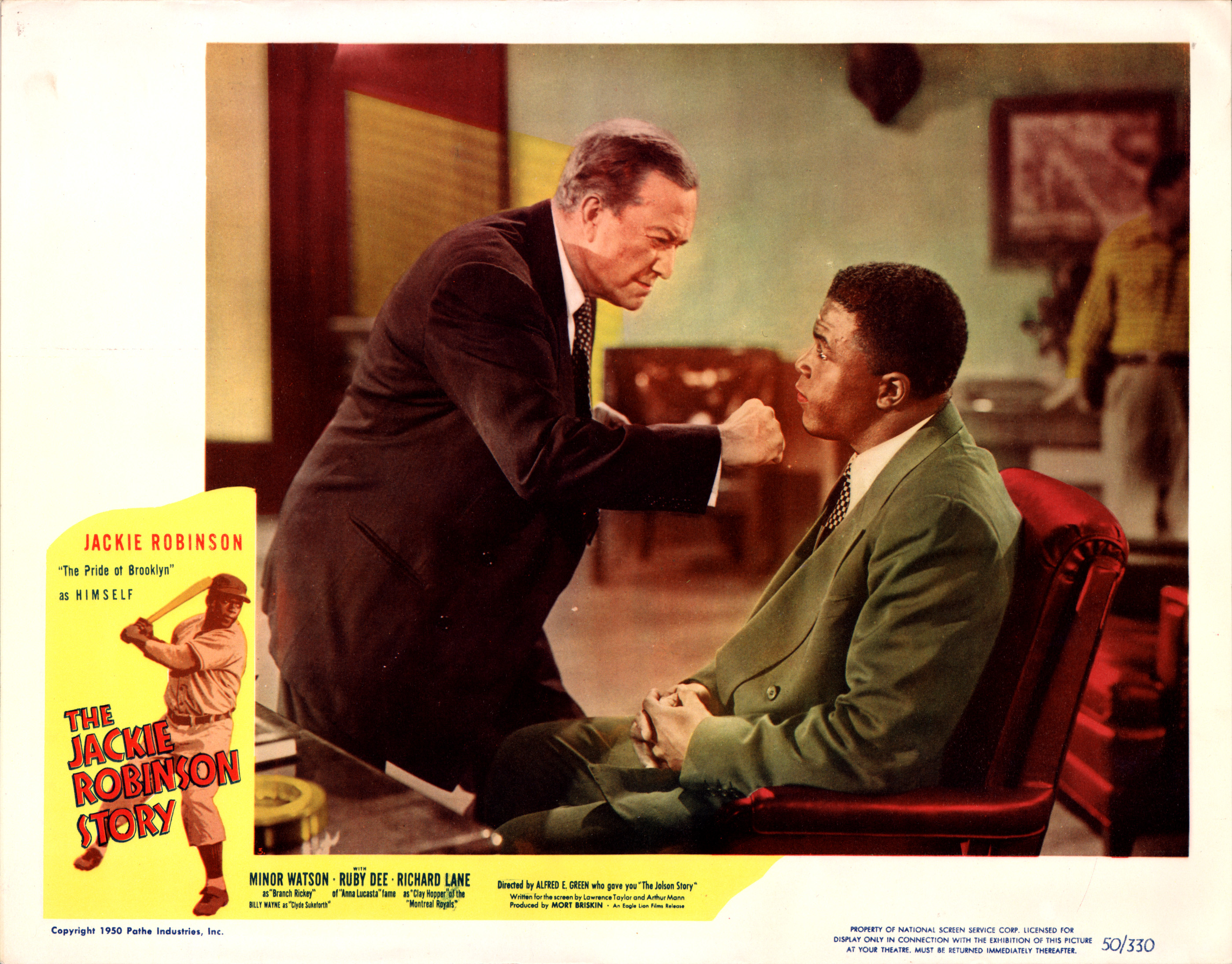
Lobby card for The Jackie Robinson Story, 1950, with Minor Watson (left, playing Dodgers president Branch Rickey) and Robinson

In 1950, Robinson led the National League in double plays made by a second baseman with 133. His salary that year was the highest any Dodger had been paid to that point: $35,000 ($468,361 in 2025 dollars). He finished the year with 99 runs scored, a .328 batting average, and 12 stolen bases. The year saw the release of a film biography of Robinson's life, The Jackie Robinson Story, in which Robinson played himself, and actress Ruby Dee played Rachel "Rae" (Isum) Robinson. The project had been previously delayed when the film's producers refused to accede to demands of two Hollywood studios that the movie include scenes of Robinson being tutored in baseball by a white man. The New York Times wrote that Robinson, "doing that rare thing of playing himself in the picture's leading role, displays a calm assurance and composure that might be envied by many a Hollywood star."

Robinson's Hollywood exploits, however, did not sit well with Dodgers co-owner Walter O'Malley, who referred to Robinson as "Rickey's prima donna". In late 1950, Rickey's contract as the Dodgers' team President expired. Weary of constant disagreements with O'Malley, and with no hope of being re-appointed as President of the Dodgers, Rickey cashed out his one-quarter financial interest in the team, leaving O'Malley in full control of the franchise. Rickey shortly thereafter became general manager of the Pittsburgh Pirates. Robinson was disappointed at the turn of events and wrote a sympathetic letter to Rickey, whom he considered a father figure, stating, "Regardless of what happens to me in the future, it all can be placed on what you have done and, believe me, I appreciate it."

==== Pennant races and outside interests (1951–1953) ====
Before the 1951 season, O'Malley reportedly offered Robinson the job of manager of the Montreal Royals, effective at the end of Robinson's playing career. O'Malley was quoted in the Montreal Standard as saying, "Jackie told me that he would be both delighted and honored to tackle this managerial post"—although reports differed as to whether a position was ever formally offered.

During the 1951 season, Robinson led the National League in double plays made by a second baseman for the second year in a row, with 137. He also kept the Dodgers in contention for the 1951 pennant. During the last game of the regular season, in the 13th inning, he had a hit to tie the game and then hit a home run in the 14th inning, which proved to be the winning margin. This forced a best-of-three playoff series against the crosstown rival New York Giants.

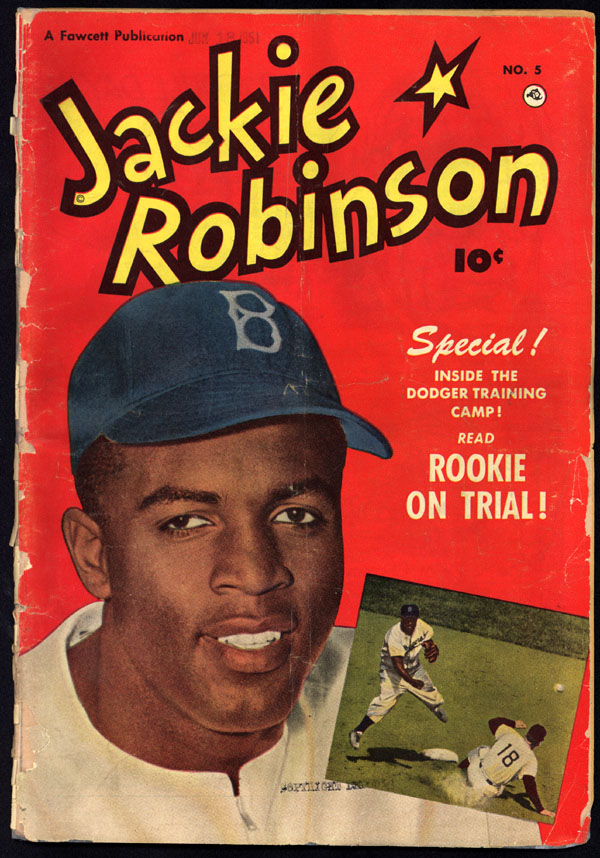
Jackie Robinson comic book, issue No. 5, 1951

Despite Robinson's regular-season heroics, on October 3, 1951, the Dodgers lost the pennant on Bobby Thomson's famous home run, known as the Shot Heard 'Round the World. Overcoming his dejection, Robinson dutifully observed Thomson's feet to ensure he touched all the bases. Dodgers sportscaster Vin Scully later noted that the incident showed "how much of a competitor Robinson was." He finished the season with 106 runs scored, a batting average of .335, and 25 stolen bases.

Robinson had what was an average year for him in 1952. He finished the year with 104 runs, a .308 batting average, and 24 stolen bases. He did, however, record a career-high on-base percentage of .436. The Dodgers improved on their performance from the year before, winning the National League pennant before losing the 1952 World Series to the New York Yankees in seven games. That year, on the television show Youth Wants to Know, Robinson challenged the Yankees' general manager, George Weiss, on the racial record of his team, which had yet to sign a black player. Sportswriter Dick Young, whom Robinson had described as a "bigot", said, "If there was one flaw in Jackie, it was the common one. He believed that everything unpleasant that happened to him happened because of his blackness." The 1952 season was the last year Robinson was an everyday starter at second base. Afterward, Robinson played variously at first, second, and third bases, shortstop, and in the outfield, with Jim Gilliam, another black player, taking over everyday second base duties. Robinson's interests began to shift toward the prospect of managing a major league team. He had hoped to gain experience by managing in the Puerto Rican Winter League, but according to the New York Post, Commissioner Happy Chandler denied the request.

In 1953, Robinson had 109 runs, a .329 batting average, and 17 steals, leading the Dodgers to another National League pennant (and another World Series loss to the Yankees, this time in six games). Robinson's continued success spawned a string of death threats. He was not dissuaded, however, from addressing racial issues publicly. That year, he served as editor for Our Sports magazine, a periodical focusing on Negro sports issues; contributions to the magazine included an article on golf course segregation by Robinson's old friend Joe Louis. Robinson also openly criticized segregated hotels and restaurants that served the Dodger organization; a number of these establishments integrated as a result, including the five-star Chase Park Hotel in St. Louis.

==== World Series championship and retirement (1954–1956) ====
In 1954, Robinson had 62 runs scored, a .311 batting average, and 7 steals. His best day at the plate was on June 17, when he hit two home runs and two doubles. The following autumn, Robinson won his only championship when the Dodgers defeated the New York Yankees in the 1955 World Series. Although the team enjoyed ultimate success, 1955 was the worst year of Robinson's individual career. He hit .256 and stole only 12 bases. The Dodgers tried Robinson in the outfield and as a third baseman, both because of his diminishing abilities and because Gilliam was established at second base. Robinson, then 36 years old, missed 49 games and did not play in Game 7 of the World Series. He missed the game because manager Walter Alston decided to play Gilliam at second and Don Hoak at third base. That season, the Dodgers' Don Newcombe became the first black major league pitcher to win twenty games in a year.

In 1956, Robinson had 61 runs scored, a .275 batting average, and 12 steals. By then, he had begun to exhibit the effects of diabetes and to lose interest in the prospect of playing or managing professional baseball. Robinson ended his major league career when he struck out to end Game 7 of the 1956 World Series. After the season, the Dodgers traded Robinson to the arch-rival New York Giants for Dick Littlefield and $35,000 cash (equal to $414,474 today). The trade, however, was never completed; unbeknownst to the Dodgers, Robinson had already agreed with the president of Chock full o'Nuts to quit baseball and become an executive with the company. Since Robinson had sold exclusive rights to any retirement story to Look magazine two years previously, his retirement decision was revealed through the magazine, instead of through the Dodgers organization.

== Legacy ==
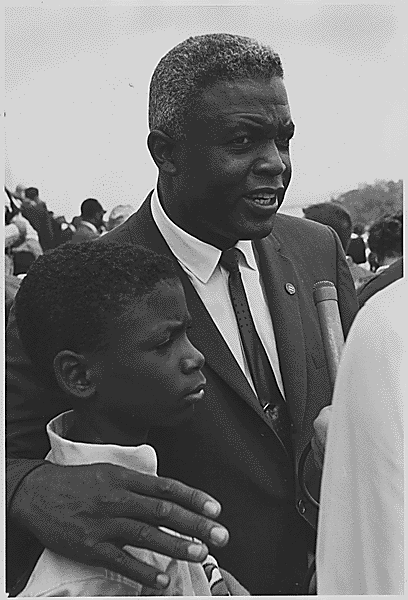
Robinson and his son David are interviewed during the March on Washington, August 28, 1963.

Robinson's major league debut brought an end to approximately sixty years of segregation in professional baseball, known as the baseball color line. After World War II, several other forces were also leading the country toward increased equality for blacks, including their accelerated migration to the North, where their political clout grew, and President Harry Truman's desegregation of the military in 1948. Robinson's breaking of the baseball color line and his professional success symbolized these broader changes and demonstrated that the fight for equality was more than simply a political matter. Civil rights movement leader Martin Luther King Jr. said that he was "a legend and a symbol in his own time", and that he "challenged the dark skies of intolerance and frustration." According to historian Doris Kearns Goodwin, Robinson's "efforts were a monumental step in the civil-rights revolution in America ... [His] accomplishments allowed black and white Americans to be more respectful and open to one another and more appreciative of everyone's abilities."

Beginning his major league career at the relatively advanced age of 28, he played only ten seasons from 1947 to 1956, all of them for the Brooklyn Dodgers. During his career, the Dodgers played in six World Series, and Robinson himself played in six All-Star Games. In 1999, he was one of 30 players named to the Major League Baseball All-Century Team.

Robinson's career is generally considered to mark the beginning of the post–"long ball" era in baseball, in which a reliance on raw power-hitting gave way to balanced offensive strategies that used footspeed to create runs through aggressive baserunning. Robinson exhibited the combination of hitting ability and speed which exemplified the new era. He scored more than 100 runs in six of his ten seasons (averaging more than 110 runs from 1947 to 1953), had a .311 career batting average, a .409 career on-base percentage, a .474 slugging percentage, and substantially more walks than strikeouts (740 to 291). Robinson was one of only two players during the span of 1947–56 to accumulate at least 125 steals while registering a slugging percentage over .425 (Minnie Miñoso was the other). He accumulated 197 stolen bases in total, including 19 steals of home. None of the latter were double steals (in which a player stealing home is assisted by a player stealing another base at the same time). Robinson has been referred to by author David Falkner as "the father of modern base-stealing".

Historical statistical analysis indicates Robinson was an outstanding fielder throughout his ten years in the major leagues and at virtually every position he played. After playing his rookie season at first base, Robinson spent most of his career as a second baseman. He led the league in fielding among second basemen in 1950 and 1951. Toward the end of his career, he played about 2,000 innings at third base and about 1,175 innings in the outfield, excelling at both.

Assessing himself, Robinson said, "I'm not concerned with your liking or disliking me ... all I ask is that you respect me as a human being." Regarding Robinson's qualities on the field, Leo Durocher said, "You want a guy that comes to play. But he didn't just come to play. He came to beat you. He came to stuff the damn bat right up your ass."

=== Portrayals on stage, film and television ===
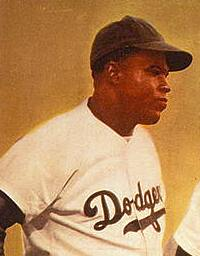
Depiction of Robinson in lobby card for the 1950 film The Jackie Robinson Story

Robinson portrayed himself in the 1950 motion picture The Jackie Robinson Story.

Other portrayals include:

- John Lafayette, in the 1978 ABC television special "A Home Run for Love" (broadcast as an ABC Afterschool Special).
- David Alan Grier, in the 1981 Broadway production of the musical The First.
- Michael-David Gordon, in the 1989 Off-Broadway production of the musical Play to Win.
- Sterling Macer Jr. in the 1989 Edward Schmidt play Mr. Rickey Calls a Meeting, a fictionalized version of the meeting in which Branch Rickey offered Robinson a major-league contract.
- Andre Braugher, in the 1990 TNT television movie The Court-Martial of Jackie Robinson.
- Blair Underwood, in the 1996 HBO television movie Soul of the Game.
- Antonio Todd in "Colors", a 2005 episode of the CBS television series Cold Case.
- Chadwick Boseman, in the 2013 motion picture 42.
- Robert Hamilton in "Sundown", a 2020 episode of the HBO television series Lovecraft Country.

Robinson was also the subject of a 2016 PBS documentary, Jackie Robinson, which was directed by Ken Burns and features Jamie Foxx doing voice-over as Robinson.

== Post-baseball life ==
Robinson once told future Hall of Fame inductee Hank Aaron that "the game of baseball is great, but the greatest thing is what you do after your career is over." Robinson retired from baseball at age 37 on January 5, 1957. Later that year, after he complained of numerous physical ailments, he was diagnosed with diabetes, a disease that also afflicted his brothers. Although Robinson adopted an insulin injection regimen, the state of medicine at the time could not prevent the continued deterioration of Robinson's physical condition from the disease.

In October 1959, Robinson entered the Greenville Municipal Airport's whites-only waiting room. Airport police asked Robinson to leave, but he refused. At a National Association for the Advancement of Colored People (NAACP) speech in Greenville, South Carolina, Robinson urged "complete freedom" and encouraged black citizens to vote and to protest their second-class citizenship. The following January, approximately 1,000 people marched on New Year's Day to the airport, which was desegregated shortly thereafter.

In his first year of eligibility for the Baseball Hall of Fame in 1962, Robinson encouraged voters to consider only his on-field qualifications, rather than his cultural impact on the game. He was elected on the first ballot, becoming the first Black American player inducted into the Cooperstown museum.

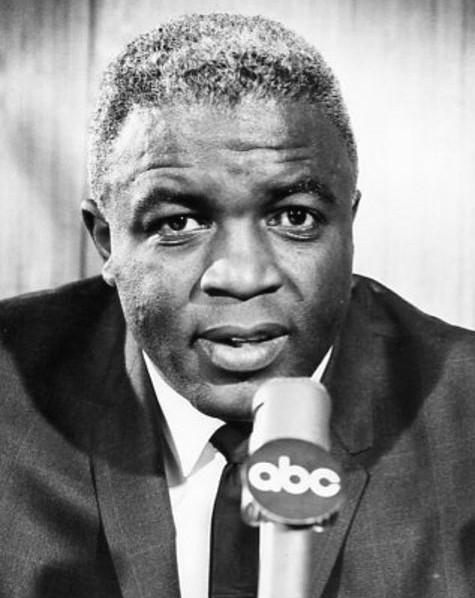
Robinson as an ABC sports announcer, 1965

In 1965, Robinson served as an analyst for ABC's Major League Baseball Game of the Week telecasts, the first Black American to do so. In 1966, Robinson was hired as general manager for the short-lived Brooklyn Dodgers of the Continental Football League. In 1972, he served as a part-time commentator on Montreal Expos telecasts.

From 1957 to 1964, Robinson was the vice president for personnel at Chock full o'Nuts; he was the first Black American to serve as vice president of a major American corporation. Robinson always considered his business career as advancing the cause of black people in commerce and industry. He also chaired the NAACP's million-dollar Freedom Fund Drive in 1957, and served on the organization's board until 1967. In 1964, he helped found, with Harlem businessman Dunbar McLaurin, Freedom National Bank—a Black-owned and operated commercial bank based in Harlem. He also served as the bank's first chairman of the board. In 1970, Robinson established the Jackie Robinson Construction Company to build housing for low-income families.

Robinson was active in politics throughout his post-baseball life. He identified himself as a political independent, although he held conservative opinions on several issues, including the Vietnam War (he once wrote to Martin Luther King Jr. to defend the Johnson Administration's military policy). After supporting Richard Nixon in his 1960 presidential race against John F. Kennedy, Robinson later praised Kennedy effusively for his stance on civil rights. Robinson was angered by the 1964 presidential election candidacy of conservative Republican Senator Barry Goldwater of Arizona, who had opposed the Civil Rights Act of 1964. He became one of six national directors for Nelson Rockefeller's unsuccessful campaign to be nominated as the Republican candidate for the election. After the party nominated Goldwater instead, Robinson left the party's convention commenting that he now had "a better understanding of how it must have felt to be a Jew in Hitler's Germany". He later became special assistant for community affairs when Rockefeller was re-elected governor of New York in 1966 and in 1971 was appointed to the New York State Athletic Commission by Rockefeller. In 1968, he broke with the Republican party and supported Hubert Humphrey against Nixon in that year's presidential election.

Robinson protested against the major leagues' ongoing lack of minority managers and central office personnel, and he turned down an invitation to appear in an old-timers' game at Yankee Stadium in 1969. He made his final public appearance on October 15, 1972, nine days before his death, throwing the ceremonial first pitch before Game 2 of the World Series at Riverfront Stadium in Cincinnati. He gratefully accepted a plaque honoring the twenty-fifth anniversary of his MLB debut, but also commented, "I'm going to be tremendously more pleased and more proud when I look at that third base coaching line one day and see a Black face managing in baseball." This wish was only fulfilled after Robinson's death: following the 1974 season, the Cleveland Indians gave their managerial post to Frank Robinson (no relation to Jackie), a Hall of Fame-bound player who would go on to manage three other teams. Despite the success of these two Robinsons and other Black players, the number of Black American players in Major League Baseball has declined since the 1970s.

== Family life and death ==
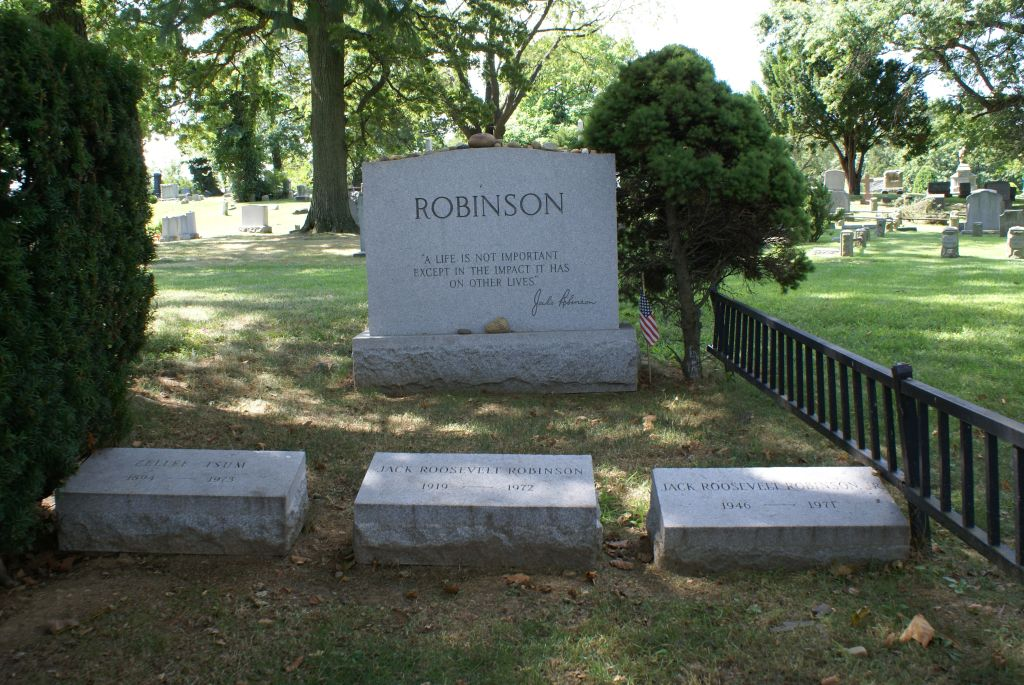
Robinson's family gravesite in Cypress Hills Cemetery. Robinson is buried alongside his mother-in-law Zellee Isum and his son Jackie Robinson Jr.

After Robinson's retirement from baseball, his wife Rachel Robinson pursued a career in academic nursing. She became an assistant professor at the Yale School of Nursing and director of nursing at the Connecticut Mental Health Center. She also served on the board of the Freedom National Bank until it closed in 1990. She and Jackie had three children: Jackie Robinson Jr. (1946–1971), Sharon Robinson (b. 1950), and David Robinson (b. 1952).

Michelle Obama delivering comments about Robinson at the 42 film workshop in the State Dining Room of the White House in April 2013.

Robinson's eldest son, Jackie Robinson Jr., had emotional trouble during his childhood and entered special education at an early age. He enlisted in the Army in search of a disciplined environment, served in the Vietnam War, and was wounded in action on November 19, 1965. After his discharge, he struggled with drug problems. Robinson Jr. eventually completed the treatment program at Daytop Village in Seymour, Connecticut, and became a counselor at the institution. On June 17, 1971, he was killed in an automobile accident at age 24. The experience with his son's drug addiction turned Robinson Sr. into an avid anti-drug crusader toward the end of his life.

Robinson did not outlive his son by very long. In 1968, he suffered a heart attack. Complications from heart disease and diabetes weakened Robinson and made him almost blind by middle age. On October 24, 1972, Robinson died of a heart attack at his home at 95 Cascade Road in North Stamford, Connecticut; he was 53 years old. Robinson's funeral service on October 27, 1972, at Upper Manhattan's Riverside Church in Morningside Heights, attracted 2,500 mourners. Many of his former teammates, other famous baseball players, and basketball star Bill Russell served as pallbearers, and the Rev. Jesse Jackson gave the eulogy. Tens of thousands of people lined the subsequent procession route to Robinson's interment site at Cypress Hills Cemetery in Brooklyn, where he was buried next to his son Jackie and mother-in-law Zellee Isum. Twenty-five years after Robinson's death, the Interboro Parkway was renamed the Jackie Robinson Parkway in his memory. This parkway bisects the cemetery in close proximity to Robinson's gravesite.

After Robinson's death, his widow founded the Jackie Robinson Foundation, and at 104 years old, she remains an officer as of 2026. On April 15, 2008, she announced that in 2010 the foundation would open a museum devoted to Jackie in Lower Manhattan. After significant delays, this opened in 2022 as the Jackie Robinson Museum. Robinson's daughter, Sharon, became a midwife, educator, director of educational programming for MLB, and the author of two books about her father. His youngest son, David, who has ten children, is a coffee grower and social activist in Tanzania.

== Awards and recognition ==
On June 4, 1972, the Dodgers retired Robinson's uniform number, 42, alongside those of former teammates Roy Campanella (39) and Sandy Koufax (32). In 2017, a statue of Robinson, created by sculptor Branly Cadet, was unveiled at Dodger Stadium. It was the first statue the Dodgers ever unveiled.

In 1999, Robinson was named by Time on its list of the 100 most influential people of the 20th century. That same year, he was one of 30 players elected to the Major League Baseball All-Century Team. That same year, he was ranked No. 44 on The Sporting News list of "Baseball's 100 Greatest Players" in 1999. In 2020, The Athletic ranked Robinson at number 42 on its "Baseball 100" list, complied by sportswriter Joe Posnanski.

Baseball writer Bill James, in The New Bill James Historical Baseball Abstract, ranked Robinson as the 32nd greatest player of all time strictly on the basis of his performance on the field, noting that he was one of the top players in the league throughout his career. Robinson was among the 25 charter members of UCLA's Athletics Hall of Fame in 1984. In 1993, he was inducted into the National High School Hall of Fame. In 2002, Molefi Kete Asante included Robinson on his list of 100 Greatest African Americans.

The City of Pasadena has recognized Robinson with a baseball diamond and stadium named Jackie Robinson Field in Brookside Park next to the Rose Bowl, and with the Jackie Robinson Center (a community outreach center providing health services). In 1997, a $325,000 bronze sculpture (equal to $651,819 today) called the Pasadena Robinson Memorial by artists Ralph Helmick, Stu Schecter, and John Outterbridge depicting oversized nine-foot busts of Robinson and his brother Mack was erected at Garfield Avenue, across from the main entrance of Pasadena City Hall; a granite footprint lists multiple donors to the commission project, which was organized by the Robinson Memorial Foundation and supported by members of the Robinson family.

Major League Baseball has honored Robinson many times since his death. In 1987, both the National and American League Rookie of the Year Awards were renamed the "Jackie Robinson Award" in honor of the first recipient (Robinson's Major League Rookie of the Year Award in 1947 encompassed both leagues).

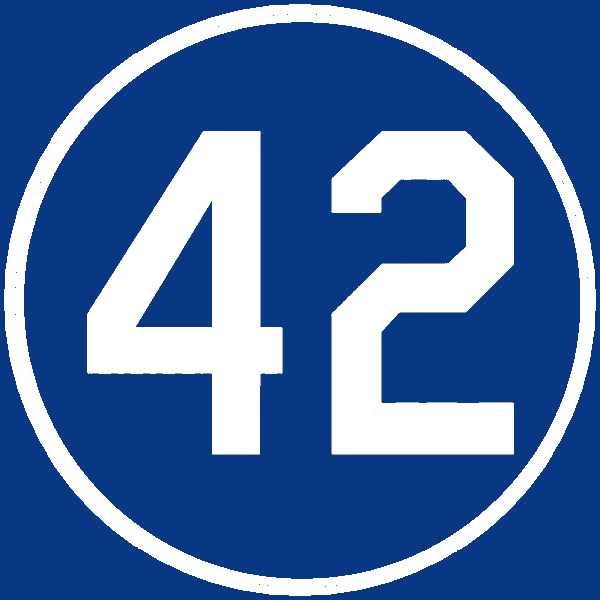
Jackie Robinson's number 42 was retired by the Los Angeles Dodgers in 1972, and by all MLB teams in 1997.

On April 15, 1997, Robinson's jersey number, 42, was retired throughout Major League Baseball, the first time any jersey number had been retired throughout one of the four major American sports leagues. Under the terms of the retirement, a grandfather clause allowed the handful of players who wore number 42 to continue doing so in tribute to Robinson, until such time as they subsequently changed teams or jersey numbers. This affected players such as the Mets' Butch Huskey and Boston's Mo Vaughn. The Yankees' Mariano Rivera, who retired at the end of the 2013 season, was the last player in Major League Baseball to wear jersey number 42 on a regular basis. Since 1997, only Wayne Gretzky's number 99, retired by the NHL in 2000, and Bill Russell's number 6, retired by the NBA in 2022, have been retired league-wide in any of the four major sports.

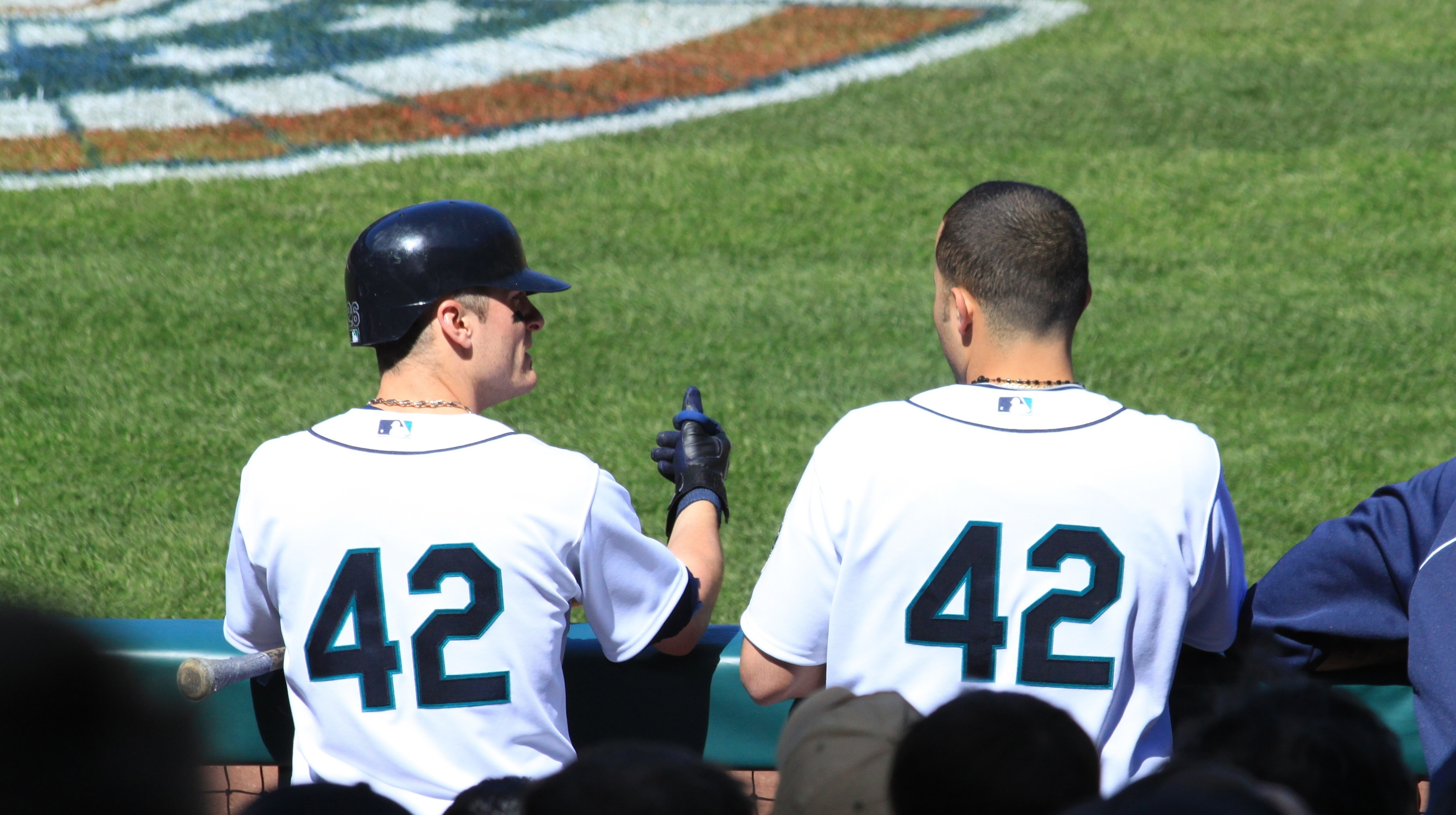
Seattle Mariners teammates wearing number 42 on Jackie Robinson Day in 2012.

As an exception to the retired-number policy, MLB began honoring Robinson by allowing players to wear number 42 on April 15, Jackie Robinson Day, which is an annual observance that started in 2004. For the 60th anniversary of Robinson's major league debut, MLB invited players to wear the number 42 on Jackie Robinson Day in 2007. The gesture was originally the idea of outfielder Ken Griffey Jr., who sought Rachel Robinson's permission to wear the number. After Griffey received her permission, Commissioner Bud Selig not only allowed Griffey to wear the number, but also extended an invitation to all major league teams to do the same. Ultimately, more than 200 players wore number 42, including the entire rosters of the Los Angeles Dodgers, New York Mets, Houston Astros, Philadelphia Phillies, St. Louis Cardinals, Milwaukee Brewers, and Pittsburgh Pirates. The tribute was continued in 2008, when, during games on April 15, all members of the Mets, Cardinals, Washington Nationals, and Tampa Bay Rays wore Robinson's number 42. On June 25, 2008, MLB installed a new plaque for Robinson at the Baseball Hall of Fame commemorating his off-the-field impact on the game as well as his playing statistics. In 2009, all of MLB's uniformed personnel (including players) wore number 42 on April 15; this tradition has continued every year since on that date.

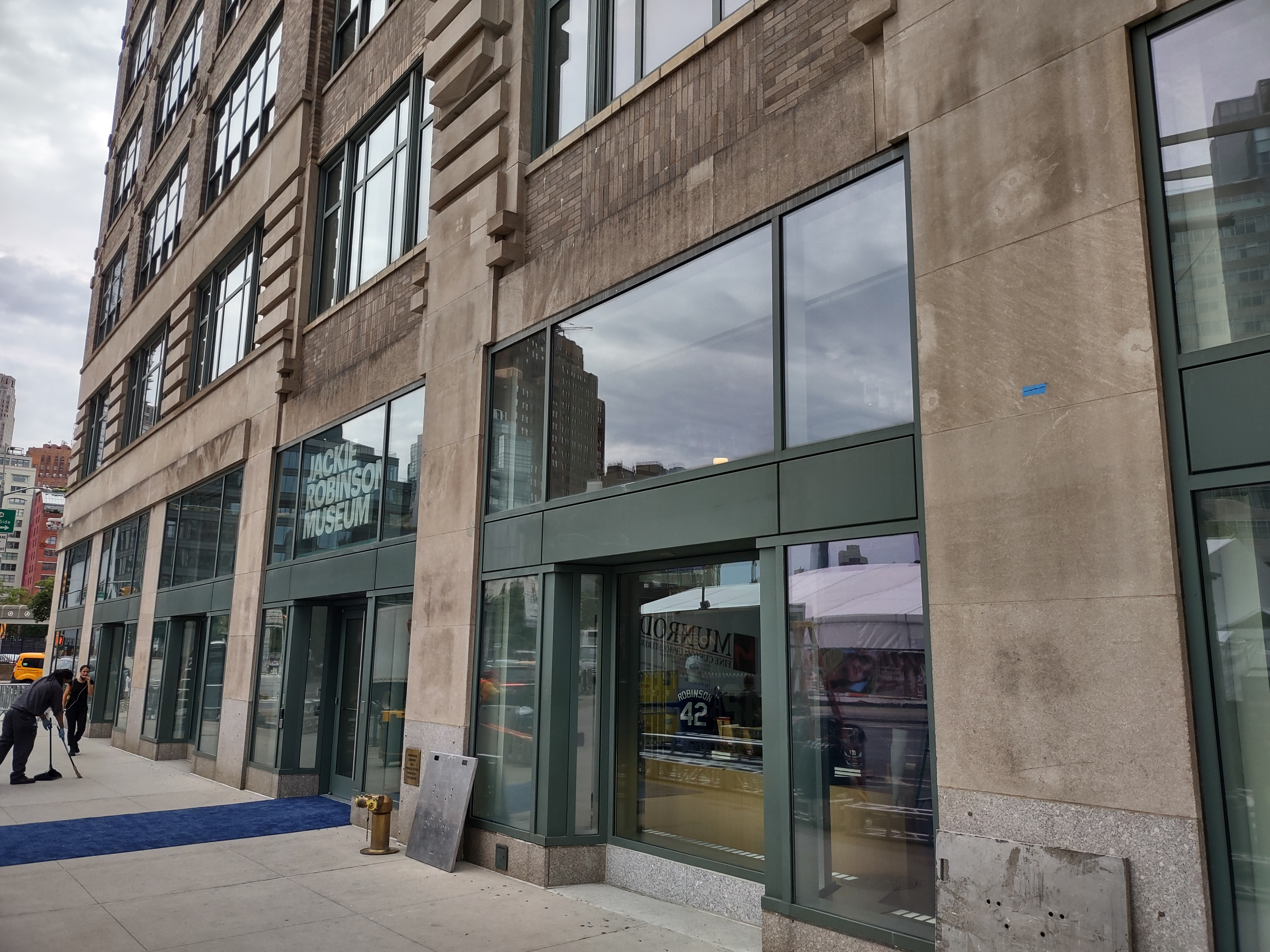
Front of the Jackie Robinson Museum, 2022

At the November 2006 groundbreaking for Citi Field, the new ballpark for the New York Mets, it was announced that the main entrance, modeled on the one in Brooklyn's old Ebbets Field, would be called the Jackie Robinson Rotunda. The rotunda was dedicated at the opening of Citi Field on April 16, 2009. It honors Robinson with large quotations spanning the inner curve of the facade and features a large freestanding statue of his number, 42, which has become an attraction in itself. Mets owner Fred Wilpon announced that the Mets—in conjunction with Citigroup and the Jackie Robinson Foundation—would create the Jackie Robinson Museum and Learning Center, located at the headquarters of the Jackie Robinson Foundation at One Hudson Square, along Canal Street in lower Manhattan. Along with the museum, scholarships will be awarded to "young people who live by and embody Jackie's ideals." The museum opened in 2022. The New York Yankees honor Robinson with a plaque in Monument Park.

Since 2004, the Aflac National High School Baseball Player of the Year has been presented the "Jackie Robinson Award".

Robinson has also been recognized outside of baseball. In December 1956, the NAACP recognized him with the Spingarn Medal, which it awards annually for the highest achievement by an African-American. President Ronald Reagan posthumously awarded Robinson the Presidential Medal of Freedom on March 26, 1984, and on March 2, 2005, President George W. Bush gave Robinson's widow the Congressional Gold Medal, the highest civilian award bestowed by Congress; Robinson was only the second baseball player to receive the award, after Roberto Clemente. On August 20, 2007, California Governor Arnold Schwarzenegger and his wife, Maria Shriver, announced that Robinson was inducted into the California Hall of Fame, located at The California Museum for History, Women and the Arts in Sacramento.

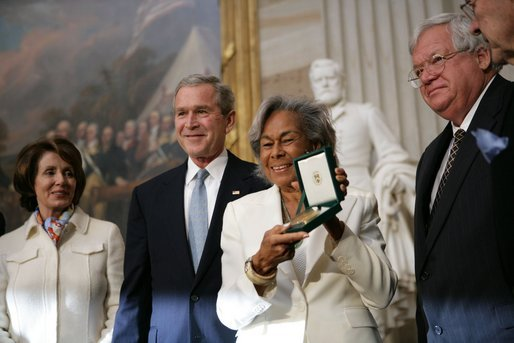
Rachel Robinson accepts the posthumous Congressional Gold Medal for her husband from President George W. Bush in a March 2, 2005, ceremony in the Capitol Rotunda. Also pictured are Nancy Pelosi and Dennis Hastert.

A number of buildings have been named in Robinson's honor. The UCLA Bruins baseball team plays in Jackie Robinson Stadium, which, because of the efforts of Jackie's brother Mack, features a memorial statue of Robinson by sculptor Richard H. Ellis. The stadium also unveiled a new mural of Robinson by Mike Sullivan on April 14, 2013. City Island Ballpark in Daytona Beach, Florida was renamed Jackie Robinson Ballpark in 1990 and a statue of Robinson with two children stands in front of the ballpark. His wife Rachel was present for the dedication on September 15. 1990. A number of facilities at Pasadena City College (successor to PJC) are named in Robinson's honor, including Robinson Field, a football/soccer/track facility named jointly for Robinson and his brother Mack. The New York Public School system has named a middle school after Robinson, and Dorsey High School plays at a Los Angeles football stadium named after him. His home in Brooklyn, the Jackie Robinson House, was declared a National Historic Landmark in 1976, and Brooklyn residents sought to turn his home into a city landmark. In 1978, Colonial Park in Harlem was renamed after Robinson. Robinson also has an asteroid named after him, 4319 Jackierobinson. In 1997, New York City renamed the Interboro Parkway in his honor. The following year, a statue of Robinson was dedicated at Journal Square Transportation Center in Jersey City, New Jersey.

In 1997, the United States Mint issued a Jackie Robinson commemorative silver dollar and five-dollar gold coin. Robinson has also been honored by the United States Postal Service on three separate postage stamps, in 1982, 1999, and 2000.

In 2011, the U.S. placed a plaque at Robinson's Montreal home to honor the ending of segregation in baseball. The house, at 8232 avenue de Gaspé near Jarry Park, was Robinson's residence when he played for the Montreal Royals during 1946. In a letter read during the ceremony, Rachel Robinson, Jackie's widow, wrote: "I remember Montreal and that house very well and have always had warm feeling for that great city. Before Jack and I moved to Montreal, we had just been through some very rough treatment in the racially biased South during spring training in Florida. In the end, Montreal was the perfect place for him to get his start. We never had a threatening or unpleasant experience there. The people were so welcoming and saw Jack as a player and as a man."

On November 22, 2014, UCLA announced that it would officially retire the number 42 across all university sports, effective immediately. While Robinson wore several different numbers during his UCLA career, the school chose 42 because it had become indelibly identified with him. The only sport this did not affect was men's basketball, which had previously retired the number for Walt Hazzard (although Kevin Love was actually the last player in that sport to wear 42, with Hazzard's blessing). In a move paralleling that of MLB when it retired the number, UCLA allowed three athletes (in women's soccer, softball, and football) who were already wearing 42 to continue to do so for the remainder of their UCLA careers. The school also announced it would prominently display the number at all of its athletic venues.

A jersey that Robinson brought home with him after his rookie season ended in 1947 was sold at auction for $2.05 million on November 19, 2017. The price was the highest ever paid for a post-World War II jersey.

In 2021, a bronze statue of Robinson, created by John Parsons, was installed in Wichita, Kansas by League 42, a youth baseball league, in McAdams Park. In January 2024, the statue was stolen, cut off from its ankles by a group of vandals. It was found dismantled and burnt a few days later. A recast statue was unveiled on August 5, 2024.

== See also ==
- DHL Hometown Heroes
- List of sports desegregation firsts
- List of first black Major League Baseball players
- List of Negro league baseball players who played in Major League Baseball
- List of Major League Baseball batting champions
- List of Major League Baseball annual stolen base leaders
- List of Major League Baseball career stolen bases leaders
- List of Major League Baseball career batting average leaders
- List of Major League Baseball career on-base percentage leaders
- List of Major League Baseball players who spent their entire career with one franchise
- List of Major League Baseball players to hit for the cycle
- List of Major League Baseball retired numbers
- List of NCAA major college football yearly rushing leaders
- List of NCAA major college football yearly punt and kickoff return leaders
- List of Presidential Medal of Freedom recipients

Achievements
Preceded by Wally Westlake	Hitting for the cycle August 29, 1948	Succeeded by Wally Westlake
