= Jackie Robinson Day =

Annual Major League Baseball commemoration since 2004

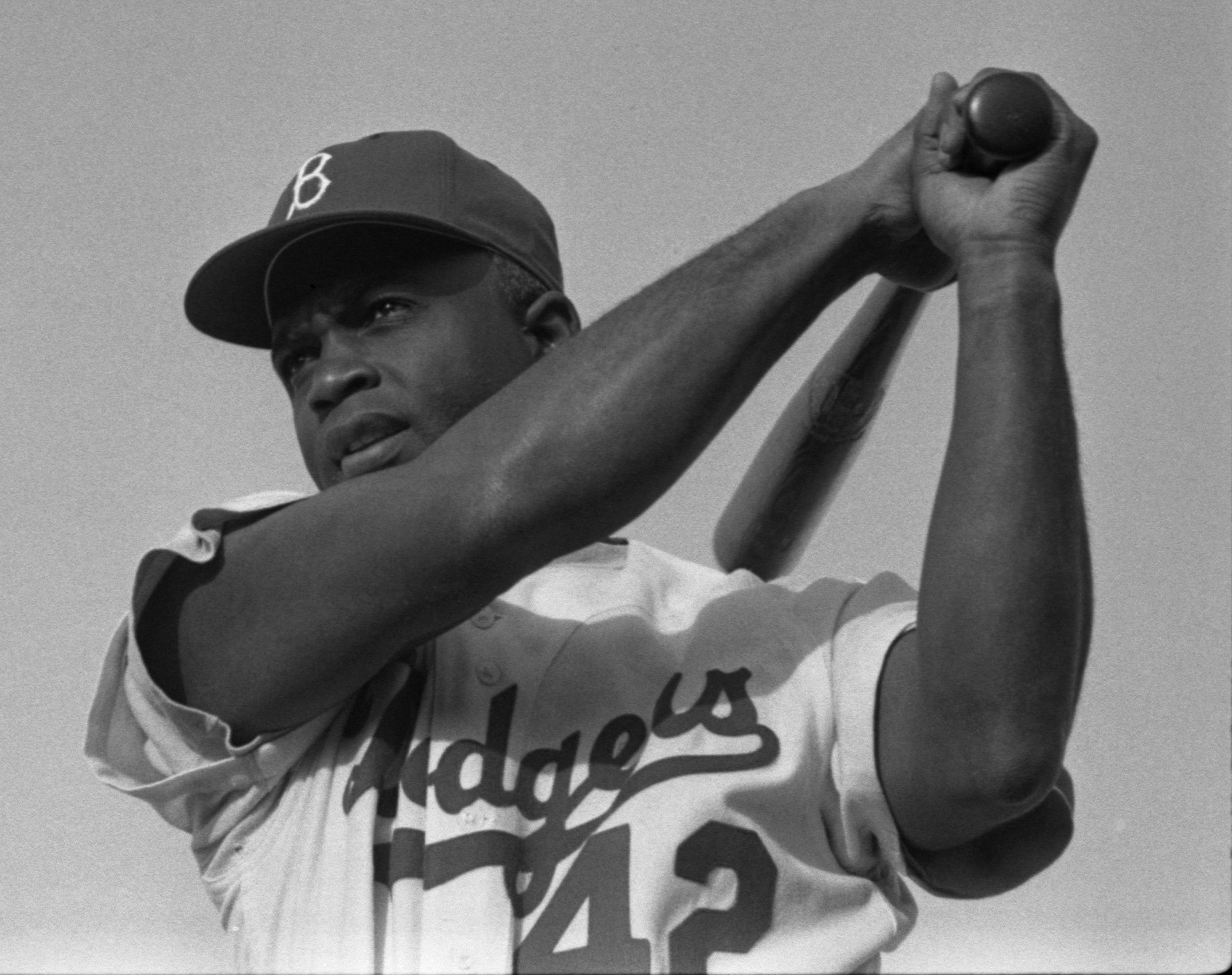
- Robinson in 1954
- Observed by: Major League Baseball
- Type: Cultural
- Significance: Honoring the legacy of Jackie Robinson
- Observances: All players and umpires wear uniform number 42
- Date: April 15
- Frequency: Annual

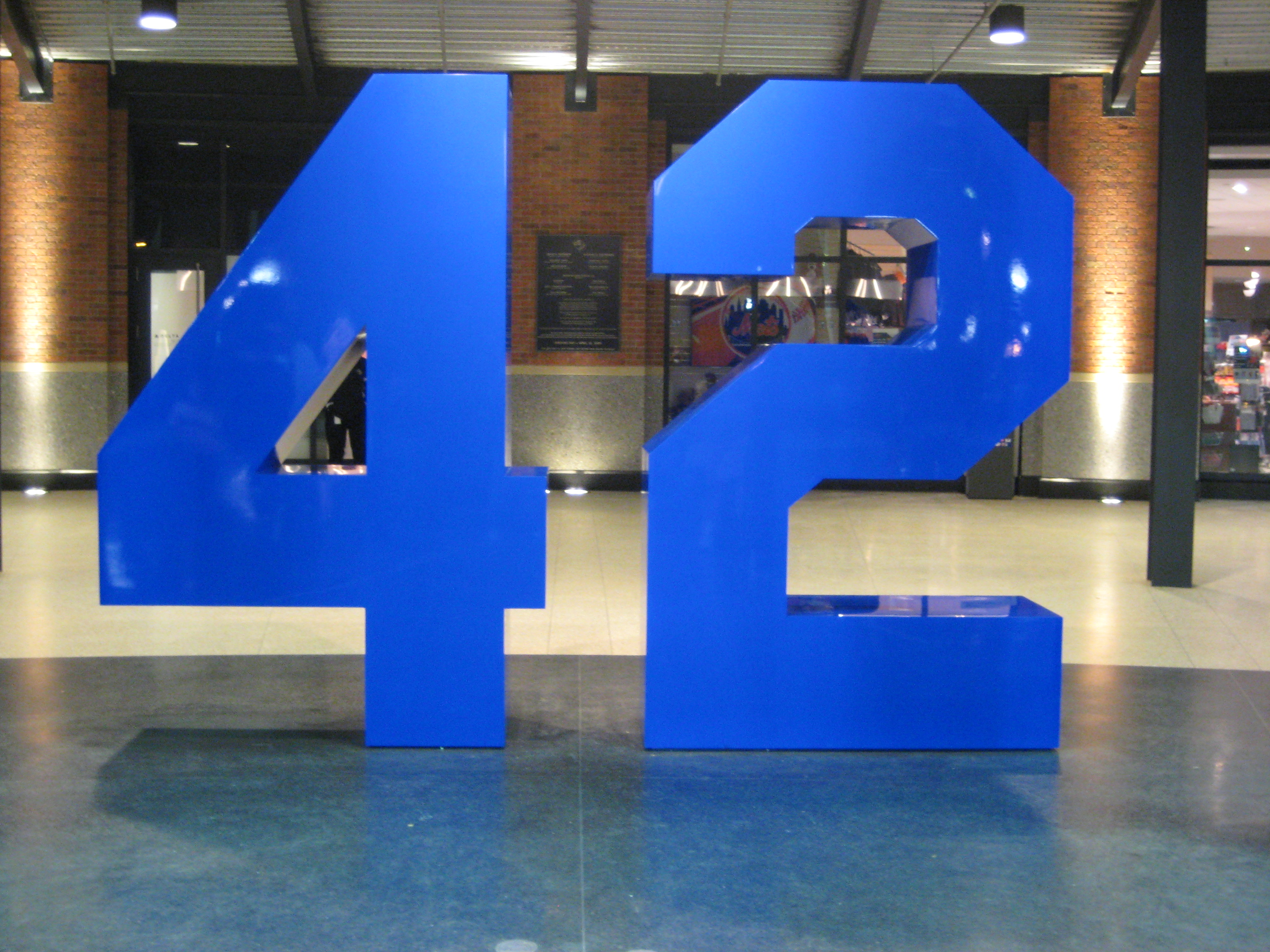
Robinson's number displayed at Citi Field

Jackie Robinson Day is a traditional event which occurs annually on April 15 in Major League Baseball (MLB), commemorating and honoring the day Jackie Robinson made his major league debut. Celebrated at MLB ballparks, on that one day, all players, coaches, and managers on both teams, and the umpires, wear Robinson's uniform number, 42. April 15 was Opening Day in 1947, Robinson's first season in the major leagues.

Initiated for the first time on April 15, 2004, the festivity is a result of Robinson's memorable career, best known for becoming the first black major league baseball player of the modern era in 1947. His debut with the Brooklyn Dodgers (today's Los Angeles Dodgers) ended approximately 80 years of baseball segregation, also known as the baseball color line, or color barrier. Robinson was inducted into the Baseball Hall of Fame in 1962.

Shea Stadium was one of the prominent venues hosting the event, having commemorated the retirement of Robinson's number 42 jersey in 1997. Bob DuPuy, the president and chief operating officer of Major League Baseball, described Jackie Robinson Day as a significance "not only for baseball, but for our country in general."

== Jackie Robinson ==
Baseball players of Black African descent were excluded from Major League Baseball (MLB) until 1947. On April 15, 1947, Jackie Robinson made his major league debut for the Brooklyn Dodgers at Ebbets Field before a crowd of 26,623 spectators, more than 14,000 of whom were black. By the late 1950s, the percentage of black players on Major League teams matched or exceeded that of the general population.

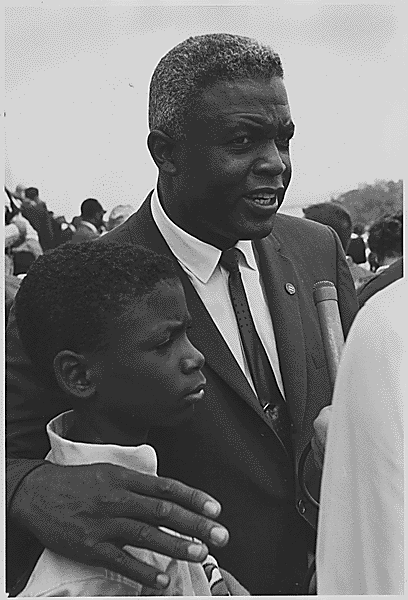
Robinson and his son David during the March on Washington in 1963

After baseball, Robinson became heavily involved working for the NAACP, campaigning for civil rights. Robinson worked with President Richard Nixon and the Governor of New York, Nelson Rockefeller.

In 1997, MLB retired his uniform number, 42, across all major league teams; he was the first pro athlete in any sport to be so honored.

== Observance ==
=== 2004 ===
In March 2004, Baseball Commissioner Bud Selig announced that Major League Baseball would honor Robinson on April 15 as "Jackie Robinson Day". He made the announcement with Sharon Robinson, the daughter of Jackie Robinson. The first Jackie Robinson Day was on April 15, 2004. That day was a start to an annual tradition throughout Major League Baseball and an inspirational reminder about what happened on that day exactly 57 years earlier when Jackie Robinson became a Major League Baseball player. The day would be the first official league-wide Jackie Robinson Day, having festivities taking place at all 13 ballparks where Major League games were scheduled to be played.

"I have often stated that baseball's proudest moment and its most powerful social statement came on April 15, 1947 when Jackie Robinson first set foot on a Major League Baseball field", said Selig. "On that day, Jackie brought down the color barrier and ushered in the era in which baseball became the true national pastime. Fifty years after that historic event, in April 1997, I was proud to join Rachel Robinson and President Bill Clinton at Shea Stadium to honor Jackie by retiring his uniform number 42 in perpetuity. By establishing April 15 as 'Jackie Robinson Day' throughout Major League Baseball, we are further ensuring that the incredible contributions and sacrifices he made — for baseball and society — will not be forgotten."

It began that Thursday morning with Sharon Robinson, ringing the ceremonial Opening Bell at the New York Stock Exchange. Rachel Robinson (Jackie Robinson's wife and 1973 creator of the Jackie Robinson Foundation), officials from the Major League Baseball foundation, and officials of the Jackie Robinson Foundation (JRF) took part in the special ceremony honoring Jackie Robinson. Festivities took place in the 13 ballparks that had scheduled games that day. The balls had a "42" logo on each of them for the games that day. Jackie Robinson Foundation scholars threw out the ceremonial first pitch prior to each game. "I'm very happy my son is in Boston today, we're happy that the scholars and family are at different clubs and look forward to expanding the celebration as the years go on", Robinson said. "And also continuing to come up with creative ways to reach out to the African-American community and bring them into this wonderful game of baseball that we all love."

=== 2005 ===
April 15, 2005, was the 58th anniversary of Jackie Robinson's major league debut. Baseball Commissioner Bud Selig officially declared that every April 15 would be designated as Jackie Robinson Day and it would be celebrated each year throughout Major League Baseball. Every ballpark in Major League Baseball in the United States celebrated Jackie Robinson Day, unlike in 2004 when it was only celebrated in 13 ballparks. Each ballpark showed a video tribute to Robinson, and many brought out Jackie Robinson Foundation scholars onto the field before the games. In Cincinnati, Ohio, Ken Griffey Jr. spoke of how much every African-American baseball player owes Robinson, who was chosen by general manager Branch Rickey to break the color line because of Robinson's inner courage and ability to keep his temper in check.

=== 2007 ===
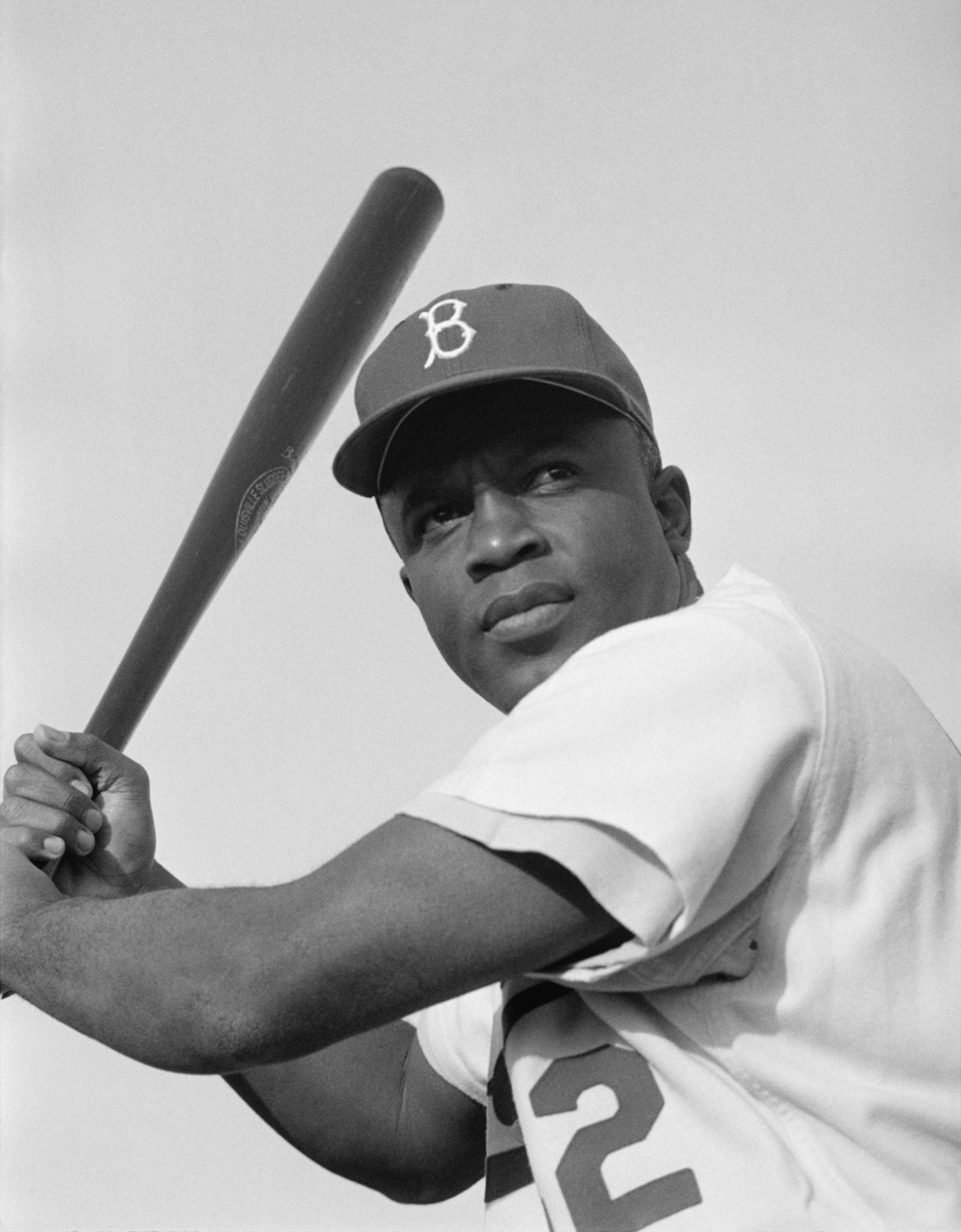
Robinson in 1954

April 15, 2007, was the 60th anniversary of Jackie Robinson's major league debut, with ceremonies held at Dodger Stadium in Los Angeles, California. Commissioner Bud Selig awarded Rachel Robinson the Commissioner's Historic Achievement Award.

During the 2007 regular season, Ken Griffey Jr. called Selig to ask for permission to wear number 42 on Jackie Robinson Day. Griffey received special permission from Rachel Robinson to wear number 42 on Jackie Robinson Day of 2007.

Number 42 had been retired for all Major League Baseball teams. This meant that no future Major League Baseball player could wear it. The number was retired in a ceremony which took place in 1997 at Shea Stadium to mark the 50th anniversary of Robinson's first game with the Dodgers. (The last player to wear the Number 42 regularly was Mariano Rivera of the New York Yankees, who retired at the end of the 2013 season.) Selig embraced Griffey's gesture and encouraged other Major League Baseball clubs to have a player wear number 42 on Jackie Robinson Day as well.

Several players thought having over 150 players wearing number 42 on Jackie Robinson Day was far too many. "This is supposed to be an honor", Minnesota Twins outfielder Torii Hunter told USA Today, "and just a handful of guys wearing the number. Now you've got entire teams doing it. I think we're killing the meaning. It should be special wearing Jackie's number, not just because it looks cool." Cleveland Indians pitcher CC Sabathia, who decried the lack of African-American players in the game in March 2007, told USA Today that "It kind of waters it down. I could see the Dodgers since that was his team, but not everyone else." "I didn't know so many guys planned to wear the number. I sure wasn't expecting whole teams to wear it", Griffey told the USA Today. "But I'm not going to look at it as a negative. This is a tribute for what the man has done, a day to celebrate." Garret Anderson, Los Angeles Angels left fielder, told the USA Today that he won't wear number 42 because "I just don't feel I'm worthy of it."

Hank Aaron and Frank Robinson, both Baseball Hall of Famers, threw the ceremonial first pitches, and fellow Hall of Famers Joe Morgan and Dave Winfield were on hand. Actors Courtney B. Vance and Marlon Wayans also attended the Jackie Robinson Day ceremony. Academy Award winner Jennifer Hudson sang "The Star-Spangled Banner" before the games started. More than 240 players wore number 42 in honor of Jackie Robinson's retired number, including the entire team rosters of the Los Angeles Dodgers, New York Mets, Houston Astros, Philadelphia Phillies, St. Louis Cardinals, Milwaukee Brewers, and Pittsburgh Pirates. All scheduled games were played that day except for several games – notably the Washington Nationals-New York Mets, the Houston Astros-Philadelphia Phillies (the game and the ceremony was held on the make-up date on April 23, 2007), as was the Pirates game against the San Francisco Giants; the uniforms were worn at the team's next home game at PNC Park – all due to a major rainstorm in the Eastern United States that postponed six games.

Andre Ethier, Russell Martin and Wilson Valdez managed to each earn three hits each during the Dodgers game. Ethier hit a home run which drove in the first four runs of the season for the Dodgers, who stole five bases — their most since August 23, 1999, when they stole seven in a game at Milwaukee. "It's kind of cool to have a decent game on Jackie Robinson Day," Martin said. "I'm going to remember this probably for the rest of my life." Randy Wolf, who was playing for the Dodgers at the time allowed six hits and three runs in six innings and struck out seven. "The whole team wearing No. 42, it kind of goes sour if we don't win," Wolf said. "It was great. There were a lot of special people here. It's a special day and I think they did it right." The San Diego Padres' José Cruz Jr. hit his 200th career home run.

Chris Young's streak of 25 consecutive road starts without a loss was broken that day by the Dodgers win. The only other pitcher in major league baseball history had gone as many as 25 straight road starts without losing — Allie Reynolds had a 25-game streak in 1948–1949. "I was terrible," Young said. "I just never found my rhythm and never found my groove. I put the guys in a hole early in the game and it was just too much to overcome. I can't imagine, having to go through that, the courage it took, the discipline, and just how successful he was. I mean, he wasn't just successful integrating the game. He was a great baseball player. He's a Hall of Fame baseball player. He wouldn't allow himself to fail, and that's tremendous."

"Oh Happy Day", a Robinson favorite, was sung by The Brookinaires Gospel Choir from The First African Methodist Episcopal Church. Paintings of Minnesota Twins logos acknowledging Robinson were on both sides of the home plate with another behind second base, and "Jackie Robinson Day" was printed on the bases. A video tribute with Morgan and Aaron among those participating was shown. Several current players expressed their thanks to Robinson in the video also.

=== 2008 ===
On April 15, 2008, the 61st anniversary of Jackie Robinson's major league debut, over 330 team members wore number 42, which was up from about 240 the previous year. When the teams took the field, all players, managers and coaches were wearing number 42, and this was repeated at all other 14 ballparks that had scheduled games that day. "The significance of Jackie Robinson Day is not lost on anyone", said Bob DuPuy. "As more and more people realize what April 15 means, not only for baseball but for our country in general, I think you're going to see the celebration grow annually."

=== 2009 ===
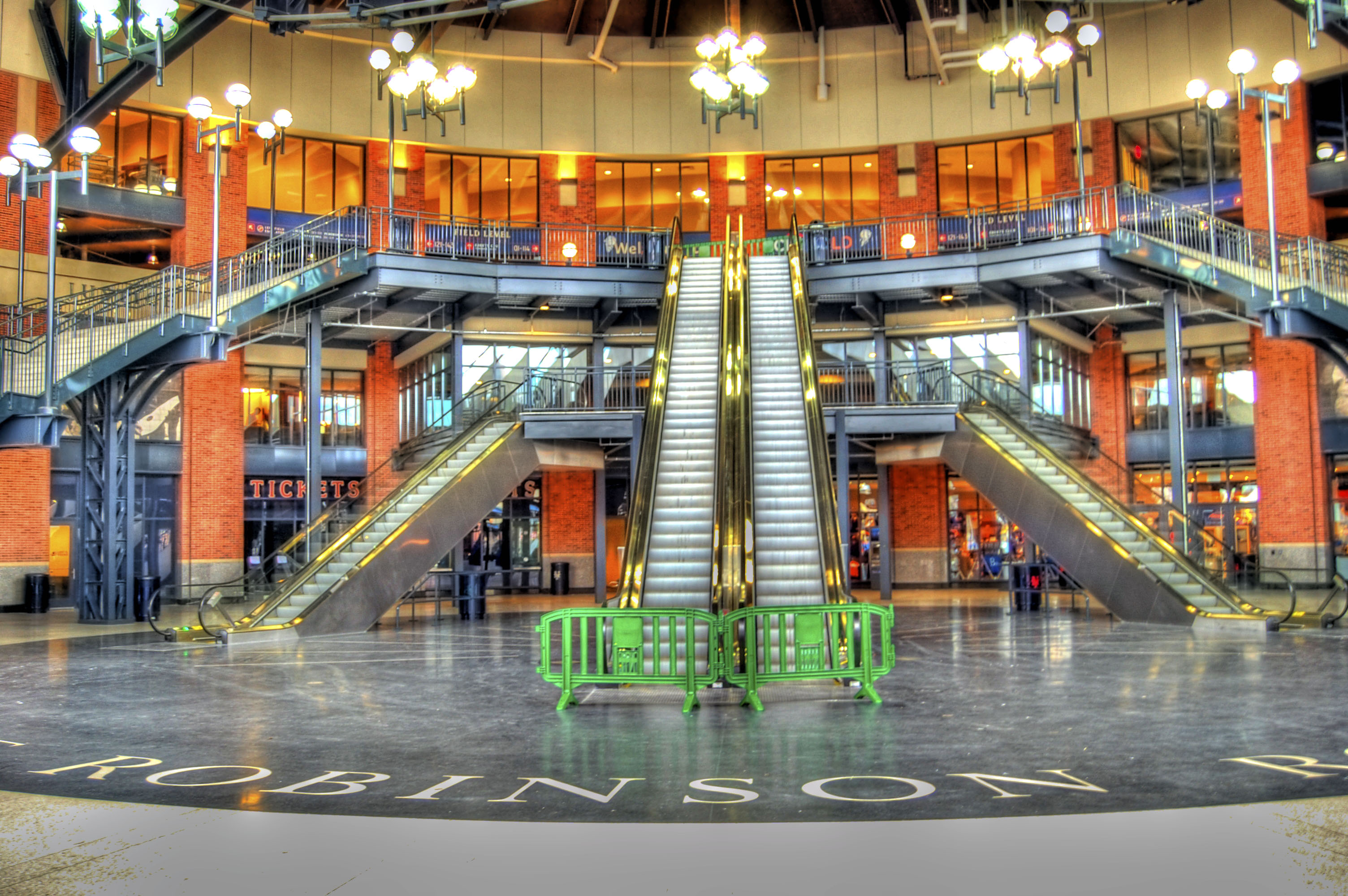
Jackie Robinson Rotunda at Citi Field

The celebration for the 2009 season, commemorating the 62nd anniversary of Robinson's debut, included the dedication for the Jackie Robinson Rotunda at Citi Field, the New York Mets' new home in Flushing Meadows prior to the Mets playing the San Diego Padres in the second regular season game to be played there. Additionally, for the first time, all uniformed personnel (players, managers, coaches and umpires) wore number 42 for the day. The sole exception was when the scheduled game at Nationals Park between the Philadelphia Phillies and the Washington Nationals was rained out; they wore the jerseys in the night game of a day-night doubleheader May 16.

=== 2011 ===
In 2011, the 64th anniversary of Robinson's debut saw the establishment of a new MLB website, www.iam42.com. In 2014, the 67th anniversary of Jackie Robinson's debut was celebrated at Historic Dodgertown in Vero Beach Florida, where Robinson and teammates used to spend their spring training preparing for the upcoming season for the Dodgers. Owned by former Dodger owner Peter O'Malley, Historic Dodgertown hosted the 2014 celebration by putting on a minor league exhibition game.

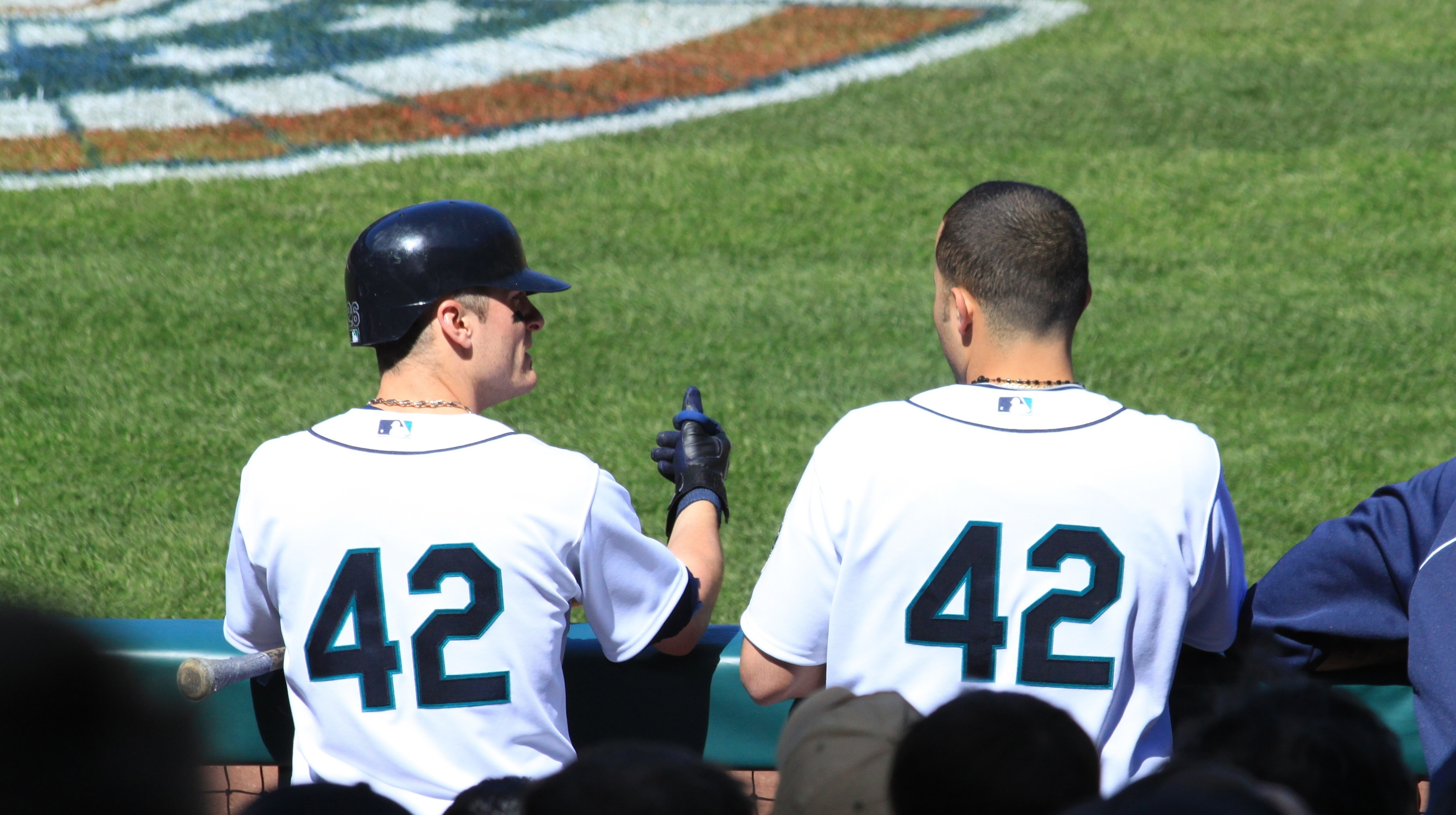
Seattle Mariners teammates Brendan Ryan and Jesús Montero wearing number 42 on Jackie Robinson Day in 2012

=== 2017–2019 ===
In 2017, to commemorate the 70th anniversary of Robinson's major league debut, the Dodgers unveiled a bronze statue of Robinson at Dodger Stadium. The statue, located in the stadium's left-field plaza, depicts Robinson sliding into home plate as a rookie. In 2018, due to weather postponements of games scheduled for April 15, the Atlanta Braves vs. Chicago Cubs and New York Yankees vs. Detroit Tigers honored Robinson's legacy in makeup games on May 14 at Wrigley Field and June 4 at Comerica Park, respectively.

In 2019, the 72nd anniversary was observed on both April 15 and 16, as not all teams played on April 15, a Monday. David Price of the Boston Red Sox criticized MLB for not having all 30 teams play on April 15.

=== 2020 ===
Though Major League Baseball honored Robinson on their social media platforms and the MLB Network on Jackie Robinson Day in 2020, no games were played due to the COVID-19 pandemic. The on-field celebrations, including the league-wide wearing of number 42, instead took place on Saturday, August 29, commemorating the 75th anniversary of the date Robinson met with Branch Rickey to discuss joining the Dodgers as well the 57th anniversary of the March on Washington. Notably this date would ultimately coincide with the tragic passing of actor Chadwick Boseman who had portrayed Robinson in the 2013 film 42. The film was revered for depicting Robinson's story to modern audiences and Boseman was highly praised and remembered for his role.

In response to the police shooting of Jacob Blake in Kenosha, Wisconsin, professional athletes in the United States boycotted by refusing to play in their scheduled sporting events. In Major League Baseball player boycotts began on August 26, 2020, when a game between the Milwaukee Brewers and Cincinnati Reds was boycotted by the players. The player boycotts extended to Jackie Robinson Day, with the August 29 game between the Houston Astros and Oakland Athletics being postponed. Both teams walked off the field in protest.

=== 2022 ===
Starting in 2022, the number 42 on the back of all teams' uniforms was rendered in Dodger blue. A patch commemorating the 75th anniversary of Robinson's debut also appeared on all uniforms.

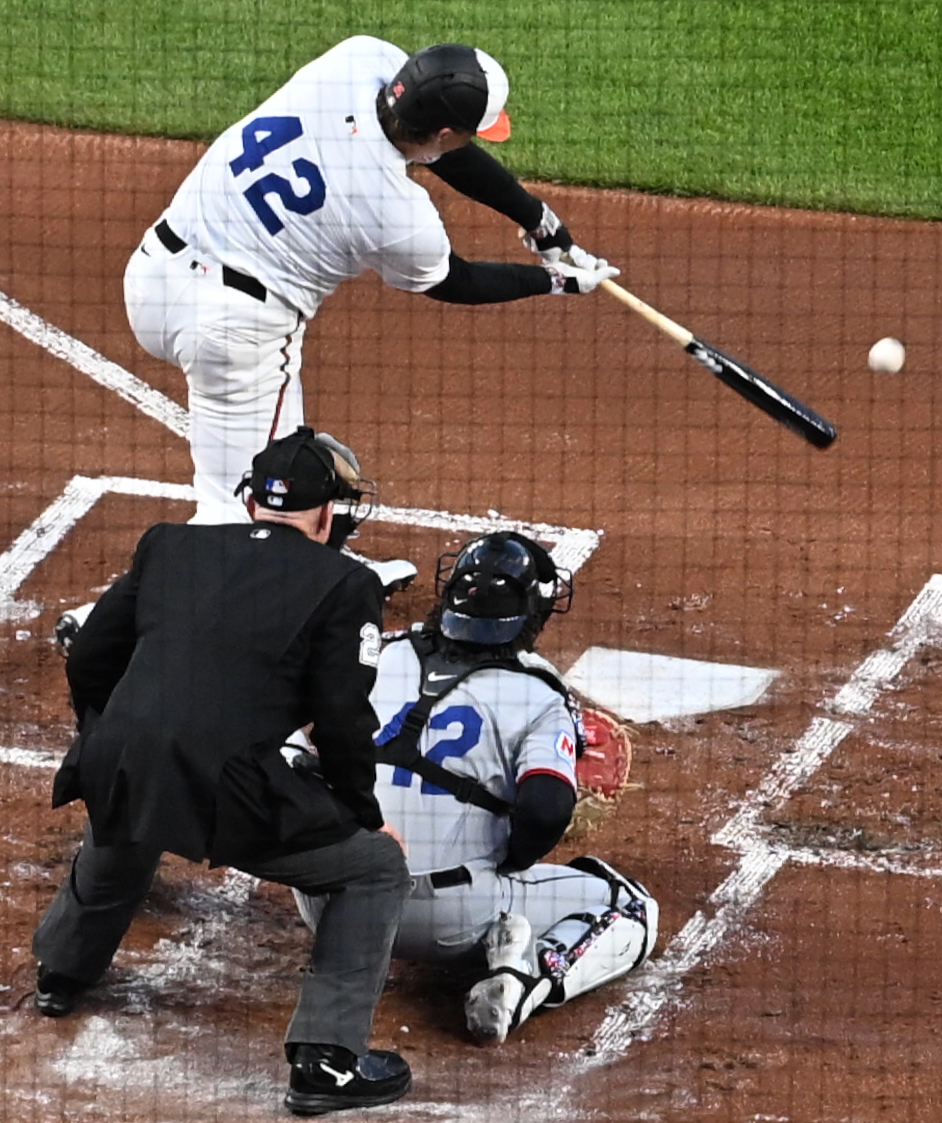
A Baltimore Orioles batter and catcher Bo Naylor of the Cleveland Guardians both wearing number 42 in Dodger blue on Jackie Robinson Day in 2025

=== 2025 ===
The 2025 Jackie Robinson Day was overshadowed by policies from President Donald Trump against topics purportedly related to diversity, equity, and inclusion (DEI), which included Robinson's time in the United States Army. Exactly one month before the day, the White House published a fact sheet of Trump's signed memorandum directing the State Department to remove the "'Diversity, Equity, Inclusion and Accessibility' Core Precept from Foreign Service tenure and promotion criteria." An article on the Department of Defense's website about Robinson's military service had its URL modified to include the letters "dei" before being removed altogether. It was restored following public criticism, while the Pentagon asserted the takedown was in error and that "everyone at the Defense Department loves Jackie Robinson." MLB also removed references to DEI from its careers page in compliance with federal law, though commissioner Rob Manfred insisted Robinson "transcends any debate that's going on in today's society about issues surrounding DEI."

The league celebrated Jackie Robinson Day as usual, including a video starring AJ Andrews that played before every game and a tour of the Jackie Robinson Museum led by Manfred. Observers found the festivities to be inappropriate due to the political climate and felt they did not fully acknowledge the prejudices that Robinson faced. Yahoo! Sports' Jake Mintz described the 2025 celebrations as having a "kind of kumbaya energy, one that whispers saccharine comforts in a post-racial tone."

Criticism was also levied at the Dodgers for visiting Trump and the White House the week before the day. The Dodgers defended the visit as an apolitical event strictly to celebrate their 2024 World Series victory.

== See also ==
- 42, 2013 biographical sports film by Warner Bros. that features the event
- Jackie Robinson Foundation
- Jackie Robinson Museum
- Jackie Robinson Rookie of the Year Award
- List of Major League Baseball retired numbers, Robinson's 42 is retired across all of MLB
- Tax Day
