= Play to Win (musical) =

1989 musical based on the life of Jackie Robinson

Play to Win is a 1989 musical with book and lyrics by James de Jongh, Charles Cleveland and music by Jimi Foster, based on the life of Jackie Robinson the Brooklyn Dodgers baseball player who was the first black player in major-league baseball. The show won the 1984 Audelco Award for "best writing of a new show by black authors for the noncommercial theater." The 1989 New York production starred Michael-David Gordon and was directed by Ken Nixon.
