= Statue of Adam Clayton Powell Jr. =

Statue in Manhattan, New York, U.S.

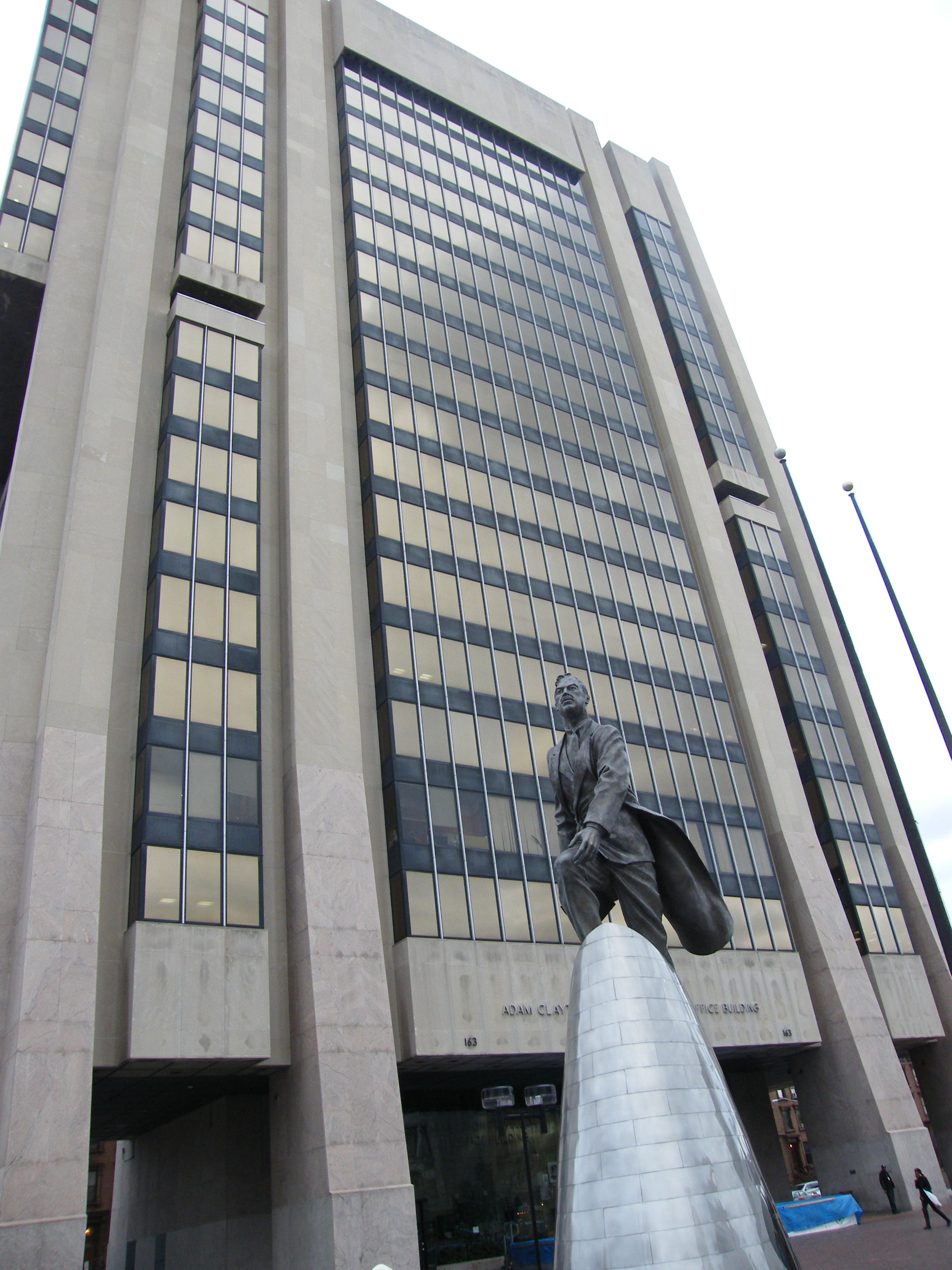
- The statue in 2008
- Artist: Branly Cadet
- Year: 2005
- Medium: Bronze sculpture
- Subject: Adam Clayton Powell Jr.
- Location: New York City, New York, U.S.; 40.809024°N 73.947933°W

A statue of Adam Clayton Powell Jr., sometimes called the Adam Clayton Powell Jr. Memorial, is installed in Harlem, New York City. The 12-foot (3.7 m) tall bronze sculpture by Branly Cadet was cast in 2005, and inspired by the quote, "Press forward at all times, climbing forward toward that higher ground of the harmonious society that shapes the laws of man to the laws of God."

== See also ==
- 2005 in art
