= Stealing Home (statue) =

Sculpture in Los Angeles, California, U.S.

Coordinates: 34°4′29.9″N 118°14′21.2″W

Stealing Home: The Point of No Return
- Artist: Branly Cadet
- Year: 2017
- Medium: Bronze sculpture
- Subject: Jackie Robinson
- Location: Dodger Stadium Los Angeles, California, U.S.

Stealing Home: The Point of No Return is a bronze statue of baseball great Jackie Robinson which was unveiled outside Dodger Stadium in Los Angeles on April 15, 2017, marking the 70th anniversary of Robinson's breaking of the color line in professional baseball in 1947, when he became the first African American to play in Major League Baseball during the modern era.

Robinson played for the Brooklyn Dodgers from 1947 to 1956, and was elected to the Baseball Hall of Fame in 1962. His historic first is commemorated on Jackie Robinson Day each year.

== Background ==
In 2015, the Los Angeles Dodgers announced that they would unveil the statue of Jackie Robinson at Dodger Stadium. Dodgers' president Stan Kasten commissioned what would become the first statue dedicated by the team and chose sculptor Branly Cadet to create the statue.

The statue was unveiled on Jackie Robinson Day in 2017, 70 years after Robinson's debut, with Robinson's widow Rachel Robinson, then 97, and his children attending the ceremony.

== Statue description ==
The sculpture weighs 800 pounds, and stands in the centerfield plaza of Dodger Stadium. It depicts Robinson stealing home plate, an act described by Cadet as "both real and symbolic; it required focused determination, courage and precise timing—synergistic qualities that were also present when the color barrier was finally broken in Major League Baseball, heralding a new era."

There are three quotes by Robinson carved onto the base of the statue:

- "A life is not important except for the impact it has on other lives."
- "I'm not concerned with your liking or disliking me... All I ask is that you respect me as a human being."
- "There's not an American in this country free until every one of us is free."

In front of the base, the inscription says:

JACKIE ROBINSON
January 31, 1919 – October 24, 1972

On April 15, 1947, at Ebbets Field in Brooklyn, N.Y., Jack Roosevelt Robinson, at the age of 28, became the first African-American in the 20th century to play for a Major League Baseball team. A dynamic player who appeared in 6 World Series throughout his 10-year career, Robinson in 1947 was named baseball’s first Rookie of the Year, an award which today bears his name. Robinson won national MVP honors in 1949 after hitting a league best of 342 with 37 steals. In his career he stole home 19 times during the regular season, and once in the 1955 series against the New York Yankees.

== See also ==
- List of public art in Los Angeles
- 2017 in art
