= Octavius V. Catto Memorial =

Statue in Philadelphia, Pennsylvania

A Quest for Parity
- Interactive map of A Quest for Parity
- Location: Philadelphia City Hall, Philadelphia, Pennsylvania, United States
- Coordinates: 39°57′6.5″N 75°9′51.1″W
- Designer: Branly Cadet
- Material: Bronze; Granite; Stainless steel
- Height: 12 ft (3.7 m)
- Opening date: September 26, 2017
- Dedicated to: Octavius Catto

A Quest for Parity: The Octavius V. Catto Memorial is a group of sculptures designed by Branly Cadet memorializing Octavius Catto in Philadelphia, Pennsylvania, United States. It was unveiled in 2017 and is the first monument on Philadelphia public property to commemorate a specific African American.

== Description ==
A Quest for Parity consists of three parts: a granite cube with a stainless steel sphere on top of it, a twelve-foot-tall (3.7 m) bronze sculpture of Octavius Catto on a granite base, and a group of five granite pillars. Catto is depicted mid-stride walking away from the pillars and towards the granite cube. Allegorically, the statue depicts Catto stepping off an 1860s streetcar and towards a ballot box. A quote from Catto is written on the front of pillars: "There must come a change which shall force upon this nation that course which providence seems wisely to be directing for the mutual benefit of peoples." Various plaques on the sides of pillars commemorate Catto's life. The statue is located in the southwest corner of Philadelphia City Hall.

== Background ==
Octavius Catto (1839–1871) was born in South Carolina and raised in Philadelphia, Pennsylvania. He protested to desegregate Philadelphia's trolley system, recruited African Americans to join the Union Army during the American Civil War, and campaigned for Pennsylvania to ratify the Fifteenth Amendment to the United States Constitution, which banned voting discrimination based on race. He also taught at the Institute for Colored Youth, helped found the Philadelphia Pythians baseball team, and served as a major in the National Guard. He was assassinated by an Irish Democrat on Election Day (October 10) in 1871.

Many news outlets noted that Catto had not previously been mentioned in schools and textbooks, with journalist Vladimir Duthiers saying that he had been "erased from history". Historian Dan Biddle attributed this to white backlash that took place after reconstruction. Jim Kenney, who was mayor of Philadelphia when the statue was unveiled in 2017, had been advocating for a Catto memorial since 2003. The statue was commissioned by the Octavius V. Catto Memorial Fund and designed by sculptor Branly Cadet. Cadet began his work on the statue in 2013.

== Unveiling ==
The statue was unveiled on September 26, 2017. According to the magazine Philadelphia, "[t]raffic choked the streets around City Hall as hundreds of people descended on the building to catch a glimpse of the new memorial."

The memorial is the first on Philadelphia public property to commemorate a specific African American. Previous memorials to African Americans in the city include the All Wars Memorial to Colored Soldiers and Sailors and The Slave, as well as statues on private property of the bishop Richard Allen and the athletes Joe Frazier, Wilt Chamberlain, and Julius Erving.
