= Jackie Robinson Museum =

Museum in New York City

Coordinates: 40°43′24″N 74°0′24″W

- Established: September 5, 2022
- Location: 75 Varick Street; Manhattan, NY 10013 U.S.
- Architect: Gensler
- Website: jackierobinsonmuseum.org

The Jackie Robinson Museum is a museum and educational center on Varick Street in Manhattan that honors the legacy of Jackie Robinson. The museum, the city's first to primarily focus on the Civil Rights Movement, opened in 2022 after more than fourteen years of planning and construction. The museum's collection includes an interactive model of Ebbets Field and more than four thousand artifacts, most from the Robinson family's own collection, highlighted by Robinson’s original National Baseball Hall of Fame plaque. The museum, which also showcases Robinson's civil rights work, is operated by the Jackie Robinson Foundation.
