= Branly Cadet =

American sculptor

- Cadet in 2026
- Born: c. 1966; New York City, U.S.
- Education: Cornell University; New York Academy of Art
- Known for: Sculpting
- Website: branlycadet.com

Branly Cadet (born c. 1966) is an American sculptor who is trained in the classical tradition of both figurative and portrait sculpture.

Born and raised in New York City, Cadet trained from Cornell University and the New York Academy of Art as well at the Vaugel Sculpture Studio and L'Ecole Albert Defois in France. He is descended from Haitian visual artist Georges Liautaud.

Cadet has work places in both Oakland, California and New York City. Along with creating his own art work, also accepts sculpture commissions.

== Public art works ==
Amongst Cadet's commissioned public artwork are:

- A statue of Adam Clayton Powell Jr. in Harlem. Powell was the first African-American to be elected to the U.S. House of Representatives from the Northeast, representing the State of New York.
- A memorial to Octavius V. Catto, a 19th-century civil rights activist and educator, outside Philadelphia City Hall. It was the first monument dedicated to an African-American on Philadelphia public property.
- Statues of Sandy Koufax and Jackie Robinson, Hall of Fame players for the Brooklyn/Los Angeles Dodgers, outside the entrance of the centerfield plaza at Dodger Stadium in Los Angeles.
- A memorial to African-American community activists, in Montgomery, Alabama, who worked to memorialize and document victims of lynching within their communities.
- A statue in Annapolis, Maryland, honoring 150 African-American Revolutionary War soldiers from Maryland.
