= Pig (soundtrack) =

Pig (Original Motion Picture Soundtrack)

Film score by Alexis Grapsas and Philip Klein
- Released: July 16, 2021
- Recorded: 2020–2021
- Genre: Film score
- Length: 28:28
- Label: Lakeshore
- Producers: Alexis Grapsas; Philip Klein

Alexis Grapsas chronology
Monday (2021)	Pig (2021)	A Quiet Place: Day One (2024)

Philip Klein chronology
Wish Dragon (2021)	Pig (2021)	Medieval (2022)

Pig (Original Motion Picture Soundtrack) is the film score to the 2021 film Pig directed by Michael Sarnoski. The film score is composed by Alexis Grapsas and Philip Klein and released through Lakeshore Records on July 16, 2021.

== Development ==
Alexis Grapsas was involved in the project after the principal photography being completed. After reading the script, he wrote few ideas and themes against roughly assembled scenes in order to pitch the vision and approach to the makers who were impressed by his work, effectively being onboard for the film. Afterwards, he had extensive discussions and change of ideas with Sarnoski and producers on a frequent basis about the soundscape and coming up with concepts in a collaborative way. After first rough cuts started coming in from the editing table, he started writing cues to picture with the ideas being thrown against the wall in order to receive feedback. Due to scheduling conflicts, Philip Klein joined Grapsas as a co-composer. Grapsas admitted that even though Klein's musical styles were different, both shared the same sensibilities while scoring the film.

Klein admitted that Grapsas did a lot of heavy lifting on the film in the early stages, writing the main theme, while Klein worked on expanding Grapsas' themes. Due to their musical similarities, the scoring process felt both organic and fluid. Grapsas noted that Cage's performance was a bit subtle, which led the composers to work on a minimalistic music with minimal instrumentation. Furthermore, Grapsas wanted to treat it as a cathartic experience, "a mythical and bizarre journey which was similar to real life" embodying a multitude of emotions. The main theme was derived into four other tracks—"Hunting", "Bottom of the Ocean", "Things to Really Care About" and "Wasted Space"—as Grapsas wanted emotional, simplistic and understated themes that were delicate and raw but also feel minimalistic, differentiating the forest and the city life.

The duo used simplistic folk sounds in the forest setting, to depict Rob's life of isolation and kept the textures singularly by relying on solo instruments, such as baritone violin, bowed strings and acoustic guitars to keep the audience grounded and focused. The textures were lighter and sympathetic. As Rob moves to the city, the music becomes more modern, distorted and aggressive with the help of electronics, percussions and processed sounds. Klein noted that the baritone violins were replaced by electric sounds and acoustic guitars with levels of distorted electric guitars. Grapsas and Klein admitted on experimenting with orchestra and electronic sounds for the city lifestyles. The tracks "Take Me to the City" and "Hotel Portland" resembled with Radiohead's OK Computer (1997) where Grapsas cited Jonny Greenwood as an influence for composing the two tracks.

== Release ==
Pig (Original Motion Picture Soundtrack) was released by Lakeshore Records on July 16, 2021, the same day as the film's release. A "pink vinyl" edition of the album was released on April 29, 2022.

== Reception ==
Meg Shields of Film School Rejects noted that the score "is filled with tenebrous strings and melancholic guitars that endow the movie with an understated neo-Western undercurrent." Michael Nordine of Variety wrote "a fittingly low-key score courtesy of Alexis Grapsas and Philip Klein". Clint Worthington of Consequence wrote "Alexis Grapsas and Philip Klein's sparse, folk-infused score aids the innate mournfulness of Sarnoski's camera". Ross McIndoe of The Guardian wrote "the yearning score from Alexis Grapsas and Philip Klein complements it beautifully." Shaun Munro of Flickering Myth called it a "powerfully mournful musical score." Tara Brady of The Irish Times called it "excellent". Asha Pruitt of SLUG wrote "The melancholy of the musical score by Alexis Grapsas (Big Shot) and Philip Klein (Wish Dragon) is elegant in its simplicity."

== Track listing ==
No.	Title	Length
1.	"Hunting"	4:02
2.	"Out of the Woods"	2:04
3.	"Turquoise"	2:11
4.	"Bottom of the Ocean"	1:43
5.	"Salted Baguette"	1:51
6.	"Take Me to the City"	1:51
7.	"The Trees Tell You Where to Look"	2:26
8.	"Tell Him Who You Are"	2:01
9.	"Things to Really Care About"	2:15
10.	"Hotel Portland"	1:37
11.	"Wasted Space"	1:40
12.	"Pignapping"	1:47
13.	"See You Thursday"	3:00

== Personnel ==
Credits adapted from liner notes:

- Music composer and producer – Alexis Grapsas, Philip Klein
- Arrangements – Alexis Grapsas, Philip Klein, Caleb Blood
- Programming – Alexis Grapsas, Philip Klein, Seth Stachowski
- Baritone violin and viola – Paul Cartwright
- Cello – Vanessa Freebairn-Smith
- Recording, mixing and electric guitar – Curt Schneider
- Mastering – David Donnelly
- Music editor – Clint Bennett
- Executive producer – Brian McNelis, Darren Blumenthal, Tara Finegan
- Liner notes – Alexis, Phil
- Art director – John Bergin
- Head of A&R and production – Eric Craig
- Head of acquisitions and artist relations – Alon Levitan
- Administrative coordinator – Don Smith, Erica Pope
