= 42 (soundtrack) =

2013 soundtrack album by Mark Isham

42 (Original Motion Picture Soundtrack)

Soundtrack album by various artists
- Released: April 9, 2013
- Length: 40:09
- Label: WaterTower Music

42 (Original Motion Picture Score)

Film score by Mark Isham
- Released: April 9, 2013
- Studios: Abbey Road Studios, London
- Genre: Film score
- Length: 41:33
- Label: WaterTower Music
- Producer: Mark Isham

Mark Isham chronology
The Lucky One (2012)	42 (Original Motion Picture Score) (2013)	The Inevitable Defeat of Mister & Pete (2013)

42 is a 2013 biographical sports drama film based on the American baseball player Jackie Robinson. Written and directed by Brian Helgeland, the film stars Chadwick Boseman as Robinson, alongside Harrison Ford, Nicole Beharie, Christopher Meloni, André Holland, Lucas Black, Hamish Linklater, and Ryan Merriman.

Two soundtracks were released to promote the music of 42: an original soundtrack consisting of songs featured in the film, and an album that consisted of the film score composed by Mark Isham. Both the albums were distributed by WaterTower Music and released on April 9, 2013.

== Development ==
"For me, it always starts with looking at the picture itself and working with the director. I try not to have any preconceived ideas. I want to come in fresh and be part of the team. The picture will tell me a lot about what approach to take. ... I've started work sometimes before I see footage. But I'm very much inspired by the imagery of the film."

— Mark Isham, on composing 42.

The musical score for 42 was curated by Mark Isham, who worked with Helgeland for the first time. He discussed with Helgeland, editor Peter McNulty and music editor Thomas Milano, where they suggested on a traditional Hollywood score that emphasizes heavily on orchestration, and underlie the tougher, melodramatic parts as it would be effective on the storytelling if it resonated on its own. Much of the main themes were written at the piano, for a traditional film score, and Isham would develop the appropriate instruments while composing. The other primary instrument which Isham had in mind, was the French horn as "I think that nobility [of the French horns] works, because nobility is one of the big words that came out of my discussions with Brian, and that's one of the main character traits of Jackie that we want to make sure that we honor, because in spite of everything he maintained this noble presence." To further establish Jackie as a special character, Isham suggested the use of a solo trumpet, so that the combination between these two instruments would serve as the voice of the character.

Isham developed the main themes for around four days at his home, at his in-built studio house at Hidden Hills, California. After developing those themes, Isham then recorded it with a 60-member orchestra at the Abbey Road Studios in London, conducted by Robert Ziegler and orchestrations by Brad Dechter, Greg Ballinger, Tim Simonec.

== Reception ==
Filmtracks wrote "42 is a lovely little score that builds to its necessary crescendo at the end, easily earning Isham his pay for the project. But it's also an anonymous effort, one so careful to honor a legend without over-dramatizing him that the whole package ultimately fails to connect on a deeper level [...] It's a nice souvenir from the film but it's difficult not to get the feeling that an opportunity for a classic sports score was missed here."

James Southall of Movie Wave added "The whole album is really very nice, but doesn't perhaps quite develop its own sense of identity strongly enough to earn an unqualified recommendation." Jonathan Broxton of Movie Music UK wrote "42 is a quite lovely score; not one which will win any awards or turn people into die hard Isham fans, but which will engage listeners enough over its 40-minute running time to warrant repeated listening experiences [...] the music in general stands as a pleasant, appropriate tribute to one of America's greatest sporting heroes."

Scott Foundas of Variety felt the score to be "incessant" and completely drowning out the character's nobility. Todd McCarthy of The Hollywood Reporter called it as "mawkishly inspiring". Bilge Ebiri of Vulture called it as "predictably twinkly, treacly score" while noting the presence of four musical crescendos in the first fifteen minutes. Alonso Duralde of TheWrap noted "It's admittedly tricky to come up with music for a baseball film that doesn't call to mind Randy Newman's immortal score for The Natural (1984), but it appears composer Mark Isham barely even tried." Lisa Kennedy of The Denver Post added that Isham's score is "emotionally hued".

== Track listing ==
42 (Original Motion Picture Soundtrack)
No.	Title	Artist(s)	Length
1.	"Good Rockin' Tonight"	Wynonie Harris	2:44
2.	"Shame On You"	Spade Cooley	2:51
3.	"Moon Glow"	Artie Shaw and His Orchestra	3:28
4.	"Begin the Beguine"	Melora Hardin	3:46
5.	"Lover Man (Oh, Where Can You Be?)"	Billie Holiday	3:16
6.	"Panama"	The Lecuona Cuban Boys	2:42
7.	"Straighten Up and Fly Right"	Nat King Cole Trio	2:24
8.	"Don't Get Around Much Anymore"	Duke Ellington	3:19
9.	"Move It On Over"	Hank Williams	2:45
10.	"I'm Gonna Move to the Outskirts of Town"	Louis Jordan & His Tympany Five	2:52
11.	"The Ball Game"	Sister Wynona Carr	3:08
12.	"Did You See Jackie Robinson Hit That Ball?"	Count Basie	2:26
13.	"Jackie Robinson"	Mark Isham	4:28
Total length:			40:09

42 (Original Motion Picture Score)
No.	Title	Length
1.	"He's Coming"	1:33
2.	"You Can't Go in There"	1:07
3.	"Jack Roosevelt Robinson"	1:30
4.	"Can You Do It"	1:55
5.	"Spring Training"	1:22
6.	"You Are a Hero"	0:57
7.	"Jackie's Style of Baseball"	3:15
8.	"Jackie Has to Run"	2:29
9.	"Why Are You Doing This?"	2:59
10.	"Rachel Is Pregnant"	1:42
11.	"Jackie Talks to His Son"	1:00
12.	"Jackie Apologizes to Wendall"	1:14
13.	"Jackie Is Brought Up"	4:17
14.	"A White Man's Game"	0:40
15.	"Jackie Steals"	2:06
16.	"They Are Never Going to Beat You"	1:06
17.	"Hate Mail"	1:24
18.	"Peewee and Jackie"	1:32
19.	"Spiked"	1:01
20.	"Branch Rickey"	1:39
21.	"Jackie Robinson"	6:45
Total length:		41:33

== Personnel ==
Credits adapted from liner notes.

- Composer, producer, piano – Mark Isham
- Conductor – Robert Ziegler
- Contractor – Isobel Griffiths
- Engineer – Tyler Parkinson
- Executive producer – Brian Helgeland
- Leader – Everton Nelson
- Mastering – Stephen Marsh
- Mixing – Adam Olmstead, Dennis Sands
- Music consultant – Lucy Whalley
- Music librarian – Jill Streater, Mark Graham
- Musical assistance – Alison Geatches
- Orchestrator – Brad Dechter, Greg Ballinger, Tim Simonec
- Recording – Peter Cobbin
- Score editor – Thomas Milano
- Music supervisor – Margaret Yen, Peter Afterman
- Trumpet – Phil Cobb
