= Commissioner's Historic Achievement Award =

Award in Major League Baseball

- Trophy awarded to the 116-win 2001 Seattle Mariners.
- Sport: Baseball
- League: Major League Baseball
- Awarded for: Group or person who has made a "major impact on the sport" of baseball
- Country: United States, Canada
- Presented by: Commissioner of Baseball

History
- First award: Mark McGwire (1998)
- Editions: 16
- Most recent: Shohei Ohtani (2021)

The Commissioner's Historic Achievement Award is awarded by the commissioner of baseball, the chief executive of Major League Baseball (MLB), to a group or person who has made a "major impact on the sport" of baseball. It is not an annual award; rather, the commissioner presents it at his discretion. The trophy is a gold baseball sitting atop a cylindrical silver base, created by Tiffany & Co. The award has been presented sixteen times: thirteen times to players, once to a team, and twice to a non-player. Mark McGwire and Sammy Sosa were the first to receive the award for their parts in the 1998 MLB home run record chase. The most recent recipient is Shohei Ohtani, who was honored in 2021 for being the first player in MLB history to be an All-Star as both a starting pitcher and a lead-off hitter in the 2021 All-Star Game and for completing a two-way season as a hitter and as a pitcher. The 2001 Seattle Mariners won the award as a team for posting a 116–46 win–loss record. Roberto Clemente, the 2006 awardee, is the only player to receive the award posthumously; his award was accepted by his wife, Vera.

Three years after McGwire and Sosa were honored, Cal Ripken Jr. and Tony Gwynn, both of whom retired after the 2001 season, received the award and were honored at the 2001 MLB All-Star Game; Ripken was elected to the American League All-Star team as a starter at third base, while Gwynn was later added as an honorary member of the National League team.

Barry Bonds received the award in 2001, becoming the third player so honored for breaking the single-season home run record. The award was given in each year from 2004 until 2007: Roger Clemens was honored during the 2004 All-Star Game, and Ichiro Suzuki was presented with the award for breaking the single-season hits record in 2005. Rachel Robinson was honored in 2007, receiving the award for establishing the Jackie Robinson Foundation. She was the first woman and the first non-player to be thus honored. In 2014, announcer Vin Scully became the second non-player to be honored.

== Recipients ==
Recipient	Image	Award date	Historic achievement	Ref(s)
Mark McGwire	McGwire with the A's, 1989	September 8, 1998	Hit 62 home runs and broke the MLB single-season home run record previously held for 37 years by Roger Maris. Commissioner Bud Selig attended the game in which McGwire hit the record-breaking home run and awarded the newly created trophy in a post-game ceremony. McGwire would finish the season with 70 home runs.	
Sammy Sosa	A black-and-white photo of a dark-skinned man in a baseball uniform. His face is partially obscured by the shadow of his batting helmet. His white uniform reads "Orioles" across the chest (obscured).	September 20, 1998	Awarded for Sosa's achievements in the 1998 MLB home run record chase alongside fellow recipient Mark McGwire. Trophy presented during "Sammy Sosa Day" pregame festivities at Wrigley Field, with Sosa having then recorded 63 home runs. This number had tied McGwire's record on September 16. Sosa would briefly hold the untied overall record at 66 home runs on September 25 before being surpassed by McGwire to end the season.	
Cal Ripken Jr.	A man with short hair prepares to swing a baseball bat. He is wearing a black shirt with "Orioles" written in orange (obscured), and the bat is held over his right shoulder. He is wearing orange and black batting gloves on his hands.	July 10, 2001	Ripken broke one of baseball's "unbreakable" records by playing in 2,131 consecutive games. His durability earned him the nickname "Iron Man", referencing Lou Gehrig (the "Iron Horse"), the player whose record he broke. Ripken would finish his career with 2,632 consecutive games played out of his 3,001 career games. He played for the Baltimore Orioles for 21 seasons, hitting 431 home runs and redefining the role of the shortstop in baseball.	
Tony Gwynn	Profile view of a dark-skinned, heavyset man wearing a dark suit, white dress shirt, and a ballcap. He is in an elevated, sitting position in a car pointing to the left with his right arm.	July 10, 2001	Gwynn played 20 seasons with the San Diego Padres, amassing 15 All-Star appearances and leading the league in batting average 8 times. His .338 average ranks him 17th on the all-time list for career batting average. Gwynn was the 1999 recipient of the Roberto Clemente Award, won five Gold Glove Awards, and notched a .306 career average in the postseason.	
Barry Bonds	A man in a white baseball uniform stands in the left-handed batter's box. He is holding a black bat and wearing a black batting helmet. His uniform reads "Giants" across the chest.	October 27, 2001	Set the single-season home run record with 73 home runs, breaking Mark McGwire's record of 70 from 1998. Bonds also broke Babe Ruth's single-season records for slugging percentage and walks and had one of the best all-around seasons in the history of baseball.	
Rickey Henderson	A dark-skinned man in a dark blue shirt. He is holding a black baseball bat over his shoulder in both hands. He is wearing a navy blue baseball cap with a red "B" outlined in white, and the same "B" logo is shown on his shirt at the neck.	October 28, 2001	Broke Lou Brock's all-time stolen bases record of 938 ten years earlier in 1991. During the 2001 season Henderson increased this record to 1,395 and broke Babe Ruth's record for most career walks and Ty Cobb's record for most all-time runs scored while also becoming the 25th player to notch 3,000 hits.	
Seattle Mariners	A large moose mascot runs down the third-base line of a baseball diamond. He is carrying a large navy blue flag adorned with a teal and silver compass.	April 1, 2002	The 2001 Seattle Mariners won the American League West with a 116–46 record, tying the major league record for wins first set by the 1906 Chicago Cubs and setting the American Legue record. The Mariners are the only team to receive the award.	
Roger Clemens	A man in a gray baseball uniform catches a baseball with his bare right hand. He is wearing a navy blue cap on his head with an interlocked "NY" and a black baseball glove on his left hand. His uniform reads "New York" across the chest.	July 13, 2004	Accumulated over 300 career wins and 4000 strikeouts. Presented during the 2004 All-Star Game at Minute Maid Park in Houston to the assumed-to-be retiring Clemens, who had come out of his first retirement by signing a one-year deal to play for his hometown Houston Astros. Clemens would go on to win that year's National League Cy Young Award and play three additional seasons, finally retiring in 2007.	
Ichiro Suzuki	A man in a gray baseball uniform running to the right. The uniform reads "Seattle" across the front, and has a sleeve patch with a teal and silver compass surrounded by "Seattle Mariners". The man is wearing a dark batting helmet.	April 22, 2005	Recorded 262 hits in 2004, surpassing the "unbreakable" single-season record of 257 hits set by George Sisler in 1920.	
Roberto Clemente		July 11, 2006	Clemente is the only posthumous recipient of the Commissioner's Historic Achievement Award. He led the league in batting average four times in his career, notching his 3,000th hit in the 1972 season (September 30). Inducted into the Hall of Fame after his death at sea, Clemente was recognized not only for his statistical achievements over his 17 seasons, but for his humanitarian contributions.	
Rachel Robinson	Rachel Robinson, in profile, in 1997.	April 15, 2007	Robinson, the wife of pioneer Jackie Robinson, is the only woman and the first non-player to win the Commissioner's Historic Achievement Award. In honor of her "contribution and sacrifice to the legacy of her husband", Selig presented the award to Robinson for her work with the Jackie Robinson Foundation. The Foundation has awarded more than $14 million in scholarships to students in need.	
Ken Griffey Jr.		October 23, 2011	Griffey was retired at the time of his award after having hit over 600 home runs, winning an MVP Award in 1997, and being named to the All-Century Team throughout his career. Commissioner Bud Selig described Griffey in a statement, saying he "was a gifted all-around player with a perfect swing, a brilliant glove, and a childlike joy for the game. From the time he was just 19, Ken represented MLB with excellence and grace, and he was one of our sport's greatest ambassadors not only in Seattle and Cincinnati but also around the world. I am most appreciative for all of Ken's contributions to our national pastime."	
Mariano Rivera	Mariano Rivera in a gray baseball uniform and navy blue cap stands on a dirt mound. He is striding forward to the right as he clutches a baseball behind his head. His uniform reads "New York" in navy blue letters across the chest. His face is contorted in concentration.	October 24, 2013	Rivera retired as MLB's career leader in saves (652) and games finished (952) after a 19-year career with the New York Yankees, 17 of which were spent as the team's closer. A five-time World Series champion, Rivera set numerous postseason records, including most saves (42) and lowest earned run average (0.70). He was the final MLB player to wear the uniform number 42 following its league-wide retirement in honor of Jackie Robinson. Selig described Rivera as "a great ambassador of the game" who "represented his family, his country, the Yankees and all of Major League Baseball with the utmost class and dignity".	
Vin Scully	An older man, wearing a suit and a rose corsage, smiles in the sunlight.	September 5, 2014	Scully is the second non-player and the first broadcaster to win the award. He was given the award during his 65th season broadcasting games for the Dodgers, with Commissioner Selig recognizing Scully's "lifetime of extraordinary service." Scully broadcast Dodgers games from 1950 to 2016. He was honored with the Ford Frick Award in 1982 and was inducted in the National Radio Hall of Fame in 1995.	
Derek Jeter	Jeter in 2007	September 23, 2014	After a 20-season career with the New York Yankees, Jeter retired with the sixth-most career hits in MLB history. A five-time World Series champion, he set numerous MLB postseason career records, including most hits (200), most runs scored (111), most doubles (32), most extra-base hits (57) and most total bases (302). Jeter is also the Yankees' franchise leader in hits, games played, stolen bases, and at bats. Selig described Jeter as "one of the most accomplished shortstops of all-time" who "always represent[ed] the best of our National Pastime."	
Shohei Ohtani	Shohei Ohtani with the Angels in 2019	October 26, 2021	First player in the 88-year history of the MLB All-Star Game to be selected as both a position player and the game's starting pitcher. This was the first historic achievement award presented by commissioner Rob Manfred.	
