= The Revisionist =

- Directed by: Alex Vlack
- Written by: Alex Vlack
- Produced by: Arielle Elwes; Veronica Radaelli; Fiona Robert; Sofia Robert; Zachary Spicer; Alex Vlack
- Starring: Alison Brie; Dustin Hoffman; André Holland; Tom Sturridge
- Cinematography: Byron Werner
- Edited by: Jon Fine
- Music by: Philip Klein
- Production companies: Pigasus Pictures; Robert Sisters Pictures
- Release date: June 5, 2026 (Tribeca Festival)
- Running time: 90 minutes
- Country: United States
- Language: English

The Revisionist is a 2026 American drama film written and directed by Alex Vlack and starring Alison Brie, Dustin Hoffman, André Holland, and Tom Sturridge. It is Vlack's feature directorial debut.

== Premise ==
Elise, a successful novelist, manipulates and transforms the people in her life into the characters she needs for her story. As she blurs the line between fiction and reality, her world descends into secrets, lies, and outright betrayal.

== Cast ==
- Alison Brie as Elise
- Dustin Hoffman as David
- André Holland
- Tom Sturridge

== Production ==
In December 2024, it was announced that filming wrapped in Louisville, Kentucky.

== Release ==
The Revisionist premiered at the Tribeca Festival on June 5, 2026.

== Reception ==
Stephen Farber of The Hollywood Reporter gave the film a positive review and wrote as the bottom line: “Hoffman saves the day — and the movie.”

Olga Artemyeva of ScreenAnarchy gave the film a negative review and wrote, “The Revisionist sets off to explore a complicated process (which, to be fair, is hard to dramatize on screen, without fully going the Charlie Kaufman or David Cronenberg route), but ends up simplifying it instead.”

Elizabeth Weitzman of TheWrap gave the film a mixed review and wrote, “Alex Vlack was awfully lucky to get Dustin Hoffman to center his narrative feature debut, which otherwise strains to reach its ambitions.”
