= Rachel Robinson =

American nurse and professor; widow of Jackie Robinson (born 1922)

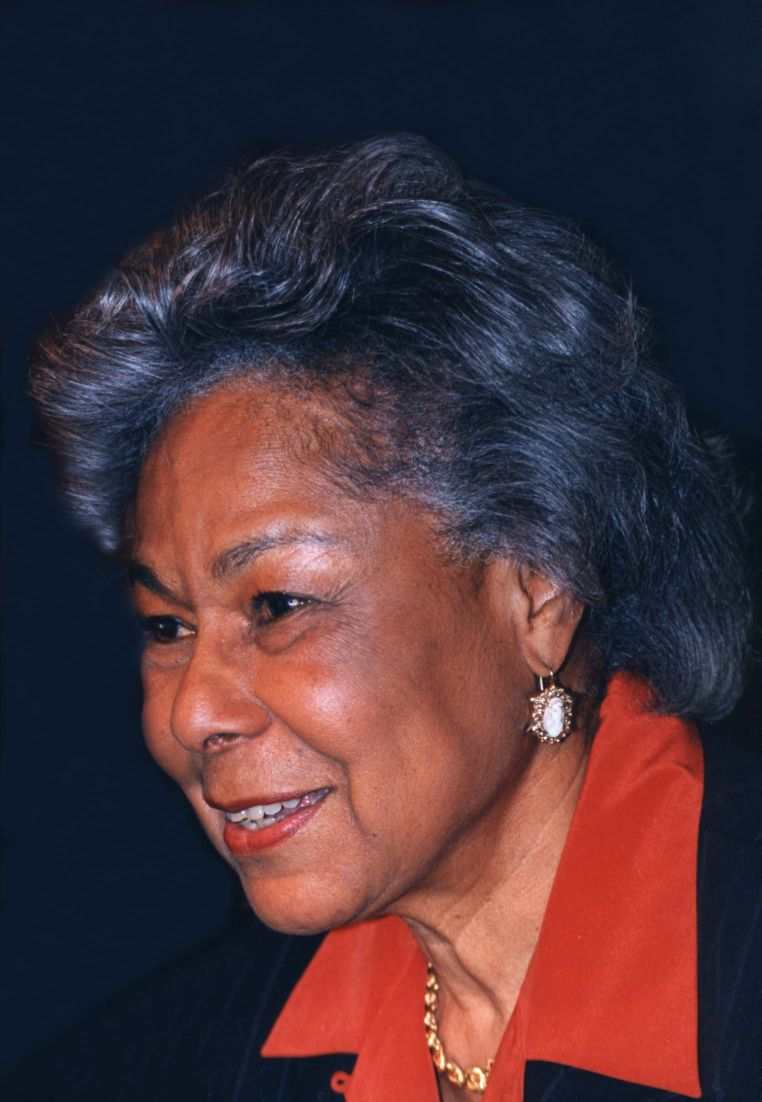
- Robinson in 1997
- Born: Rachel Annetta Isum; July 19, 1922 (age 104); Los Angeles, California, U.S.
- Education: Manual Arts High School
- Alma mater: University of California, Los Angeles (BS); New York University (MS)
- Occupations: Nurse, professor
- Spouse: Jackie Robinson (m. 1946; died 1972)
- Children: 3
- Awards: Commissioner's Historic Achievement Award (2007); Buck O'Neil Lifetime Achievement Award (2017)

Rachel Annetta Robinson (née Isum; born July 19, 1922) is an American former professor and registered nurse. She is the widow of professional baseball player Jackie Robinson. After her husband's death, she founded the Jackie Robinson Foundation.

== Life and work ==
Rachel Isum was born in Los Angeles, California, and attended Manual Arts High School in Los Angeles, California, and the University of California, Los Angeles (UCLA). At UCLA, she met Jackie Robinson in 1941 prior to his leaving UCLA when his baseball eligibility ran out. She graduated from UCLA on June 1, 1945, with a bachelor's degree in nursing. Rachel and Robinson married on February 10, 1946, the year before he broke into the big leagues. They had three children: Jackie Robinson Jr. (1946–1971), who died in an automobile crash at age 24, Sharon Robinson (born 1950), and David Robinson (born 1952).

After Jackie Robinson's retirement from baseball following the 1956 season, Rachel Robinson further pursued her nursing career, obtaining a master's degree in psychiatric nursing from New York University in 1959. She worked as a researcher and clinician at the Albert Einstein College of Medicine's Department of Social and Community Psychiatry, a position she held for five years. She then became an assistant professor at Yale School of Nursing and later the Director of Nursing at the Connecticut Mental Health Center.

In 1972, she incorporated the Jackie Robinson Development Corporation, a real estate development company specializing in low- to moderate-income housing, and served as president for ten years. In 1973, she founded the Jackie Robinson Foundation, a not-for-profit organization providing educational and leadership opportunities for minority students. The Foundation has provided support for over 1,000 minority students and has maintained a 97% graduation rate among its scholars.

In 1996, she coauthored Jackie Robinson: An Intimate Portrait with Lee Daniels, published by Abrams Publishing Company.

=== Awards and honors ===
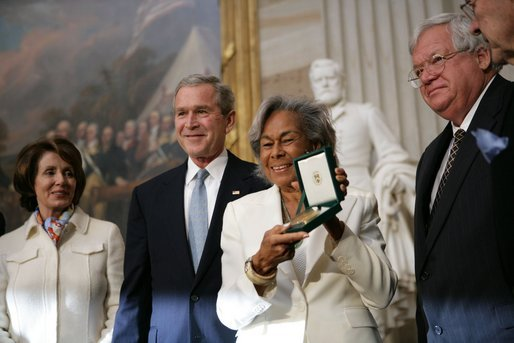
Rachel Robinson accepting the Congressional Gold Medal for her husband from President George W. Bush, 2005.

In 2007, Robinson received the Commissioner's Historic Achievement Award by Commissioner Bud Selig.

In 2009, Robinson was awarded the UCLA Medal from Chancellor Gene Block for her lifetime achievements. The UCLA Medal is the university's highest honor and was created to "honor those individuals who have made extraordinary and distinguished contributions to their professions, to higher education, to our society, and to the people of UCLA." In addition to earning twelve honorary doctorates, Robinson was awarded the Candace Award for Distinguished Service from the National Coalition of 100 Black Women, the Equitable Life Black Achiever's Award and the Associated Black Charities Black History Makers Award.

Robinson answering questions at the 42 film workshop in the State Dining Room of the White House in April 2013.

Robinson was inducted into the Baseball Reliquary's Shrine of the Eternals in 2014. In 2017, she received the Buck O'Neil Lifetime Achievement Award from the National Baseball Hall of Fame.

== Jackie Robinson Foundation ==
The Jackie Robinson Foundation is a non-profit organization that provides scholarships to minority youths for higher education, as well as preserving the legacy of Baseball Hall of Famer Jackie Robinson. It was founded in 1973 by Rachel Robinson and is located in New York City.

== Portrayals ==
Robinson was portrayed by Ruby Dee in the 1950 film The Jackie Robinson Story and by Nicole Beharie in the 2013 film 42.

== Personal life ==
On July 19, 2022, Robinson turned 100. She currently resides on a 60-acre (24-hectare) farm in Salem, Connecticut.

== See also ==
- Jackie Robinson Day
