= Wendell Smith (sportswriter) =

American sportswriter

- Smith in the late 1940s
- Born: March 23, 1914; Detroit, Michigan, U.S.
- Died: November 26, 1972 (aged 58); Chicago, Illinois, U.S.
- Education: West Virginia State College
- Occupation: Sportswriter
- Spouses: Sara Wright (dates unknown); Wyonella Hicks (m. 1949)
- Children: John Wendell Smith Jr.
- Writing career
- Notable awards: J. G. Taylor Spink Award (1993); Red Smith Award (2014)

John Wendell Smith (March 23, 1914 – November 26, 1972) was an American sportswriter and civil rights activist who was influential in the choice of Jackie Robinson's career as the first African American Major League Baseball player. Similarly, Smith was one of the first African American sport-writers to be a member of the Baseball Writers' Association of America, and was posthumously awarded the J. G. Taylor Spink Award by the Baseball Hall of Fame in 1993.

== Life and career ==
A Detroit native, Smith graduated from West Virginia State College where he pitched on the baseball team. One day after winning a game, a major league scout approached him and said that he "wished that he could sign him," but couldn't due to baseball's color barrier, and instead signed the opposing pitcher. Thereafter, Smith promised himself that he'd do whatever he could to see an African American play major league baseball. Smith became the sports editor for the college's newspaper his junior year. He began his professional writing career in 1937 with the Pittsburgh Courier, then the most popular paper within the black community in the country. Beginning as a sports writer, he then advanced to become a sports editor the year after. He covered the Homestead Grays and Pittsburgh Crawfords of baseball's Negro leagues for the Courier. Smith also petitioned the Baseball Writers' Association of America (BBWAA) for membership, but was turned down because he was with the Courier and not one of the white-owned papers.

=== Jackie Robinson ===
Smith is credited with recommending Jackie Robinson to Brooklyn Dodgers general manager Branch Rickey, who was searching for individuals with strong character to successfully execute the racial integration of baseball. The Courier offered to pay for Smith to travel with Robinson, who had to stay in separate hotels from his teammates due to segregation policies prevalent at the time. Smith traveled with Robinson in the minor leagues in 1946 and with the Brooklyn Dodgers in 1947. In 1948, Smith released his book, Jackie Robinson: My Own Story.

=== The Chicago Herald-American ===
Later, Smith moved on to Chicago and joined the white-owned Chicago Herald-American. Smith left his baseball beat and covered mostly boxing for the American. In 1947, his application to join the BBWAA was approved, and he became the first African American member of the organization. (Note: Other sources name Sam Lacy as the first African American member of the BBWAA.)

While at the Chicago Herald-American, Smith and writers from several other black newspapers launched a campaign to end segregation at spring training. The campaign earned its first success when Chicago White Sox owner, Bill Veeck cancelled a hotel reservation in Florida after discovering that his black players could not stay there. Smith said:

Beneath the apparently tranquil surface of baseball there is a growing feeling of resentment among Negro major leaguers who still experience embarrassment, humiliation, and even indignities during spring training in the south. The Negro player who is accepted as a first class citizen in the regular season is tired of being a second class citizen in spring training. – Wendell Smith, January 23, 1961

=== WGN ===
Smith moved to television in 1964 when he joined Chicago television station WGN as a sports anchor, though he continued to write a weekly column for the Chicago Sun-Times. Smith died of pancreatic cancer at age 58 in 1972, just a month after Robinson. Smith had been too ill to attend Robinson's funeral, but he wrote Robinson's obituary. Smith is survived by his family now; all the boys and men named John, inspired by Smith himself. His family is located in Kansas City.

== Honors ==
In December 1993, Smith was voted the J. G. Taylor Spink Award for excellence in journalism by the BBWAA. His widow, Wyonella Smith, donated his papers to the National Baseball Hall of Fame's archives in 1996, providing invaluable research material on the subject of baseball's integration.

In 2014, Smith was the recipient of sports journalism's prestigious Red Smith Award from the Associated Press Sports Editors (APSE) organization.

DePaul University and the University of Notre Dame have presented the Wendell Smith Award to the best player of each game between the schools' men's basketball teams since the 1972–73 season.

== In popular culture ==
André Holland portrayed Smith in the 2013 film 42, which tells the story of Jackie Robinson's selection to play for the Dodgers, his professional ordeals, and his early minor and major league play. J.A. Preston portrayed Smith in the 1990 TV movie The Court-Martial of Jackie Robinson.
