= 42 (film) =

2013 biographical sports drama film

- Theatrical release poster
- Directed by: Brian Helgeland
- Written by: Brian Helgeland
- Produced by: Thomas Tull
- Starring: Chadwick Boseman; Harrison Ford; Nicole Beharie; Christopher Meloni; André Holland; Lucas Black; Hamish Linklater; Ryan Merriman
- Cinematography: Don Burgess
- Edited by: Peter McNulty; Kevin Stitt
- Music by: Mark Isham
- Production company: Legendary Pictures
- Distributed by: Warner Bros. Pictures
- Release date: April 12, 2013 (United States)
- Running time: 128 minutes
- Country: United States
- Language: English
- Budget: $31–40 million
- Box office: $97.5 million

42 (Note: Often stylized as 42: The True Story of an American Legend) is a 2013 American biographical film produced by Legendary Pictures and distributed by Warner Bros. Pictures. Written and directed by Brian Helgeland, 42 is based on baseball player Jackie Robinson, the first black athlete to play in Major League Baseball (MLB) during the modern era. The title of the film reflects Robinson's jersey number, which was universally retired across all MLB teams in 1997. The ensemble cast includes Chadwick Boseman as Robinson, alongside Harrison Ford, Nicole Beharie, Christopher Meloni, André Holland, Lucas Black, Hamish Linklater, and Alan Tudyk in supporting roles.

Spike Lee initially planned to direct a biopic in 1995 with Turner Pictures, but the project fell apart due to creative differences and later financial challenges. In 2011, Legendary Pictures took over, collaborating with Robinson's widow, Rachel Robinson, to ensure authenticity. Boseman, cast as Robinson in his breakout role, impressed Helgeland with his athleticism and emotional depth during auditions. Boseman trained to replicate Robinson's mannerisms and connected with Rachel for character insights. Filming began in 2012 across locations like Chattanooga, Tennessee, and Birmingham, Alabama, with Engel Stadium standing in for the Brooklyn Dodgers' Ebbets Field. The production used digital recreations of historic stadiums and involved local extras.

42 was screened at the White House and premiered at TCL Chinese Theatre in Los Angeles before it was released on April 12, 2013, by Warner Bros. Pictures. Its release was three days before Jackie Robinson Day, celebrated annually on April 15. The film received generally positive reviews from critics, with praise centered on Boseman's heartfelt portrayal and Ford's stylized performance. 42 earned $97.5 million worldwide against a $40 million budget, including a record-breaking $27.5 million opening for a baseball film.

== Plot ==
A montage depicts the end of the Second World War and the importance of baseball in the United States, a sport where African Americans play in segregated Negro leagues. The 1946 Major League Baseball season, meanwhile, featured 400 white players in 16 teams.

In 1945, Brooklyn Dodgers owner Branch Rickey seeks to recruit a black baseball player for his team. Reviewing potential candidates, Rickey suggests Jackie Robinson of the Negro leagues' Kansas City Monarchs. During a racially motivated confrontation at a gas station, Robinson is approached by Dodgers scout Clyde Sukeforth. Rickey tells Robinson the challenges of breaking the color line and emphasizes restraint in responding to provocations. Robinson agrees to join the Dodgers under these terms and proposes to his girlfriend, Rachel Robinson, who accepts.

In Daytona Beach, Florida, Robinson trains with the AAA affiliate farm team for the Brooklyn Dodgers: the Montreal Royals, managed by Clay Hopper. After performing well his first season, Robinson advances to the Dodgers and is trained as a first baseman in Panama City. Some Dodgers draft a petition refusing to play with Robinson, but are rebuffed by manager Leo Durocher, whom Rickey confides in. Robinson opens up to Wendell Smith, his black chronicler, saying he doesn't like needing people. Baseball Commissioner Happy Chandler suspends Durocher over his extramarital affair, and Robinson signs with the team and plays on the 1947 season's opening day; Rickey convinces former player Burt Shotton to take over as manager. Sometime later, Robinson and Rachel have a baby boy, whom Robinson vows to be there for.

On the field, Philadelphia Phillies manager Ben Chapman relentlessly taunts Robinson with racial epithets. In the dugout, Robinson angrily strikes his bat against the wall, breaking into tears. Rickey tells him that Robinson is too revered to retaliate. Fellow teammate Eddie Stanky defends Robinson, who scores the winning run. A Philadelphia hotel denies the Dodgers service, leading to an altercation between Robinson and Dixie Walker. When Chapman's behavior generates negative press for the team, Phillies' general manager Herb Pennock, who had earlier disapproved of Robinson playing in Philadelphia, requires Chapman to pose with Robinson for magazine photos. Teammate Pee Wee Reese sympathizes with Robinson, standing with his arm around Robinson's shoulders before a hostile crowd at Crosley Field. In a game against the St. Louis Cardinals, Enos Slaughter spikes Robinson on the back of the leg with his cleats. Robinson calms vengeful Dodgers, insisting they focus on winning the game. While Robinson is treated, Rickey tells him that Robinson inspired him to love baseball again.

Robinson hits a home run against Pittsburgh Pirates pitcher Fritz Ostermueller, who had earlier hit him in the head, helping the Dodgers clinch the National League pennant, sending them to the 1947 World Series. Rachel witnesses a Brooklyn street erupt in cheers while Wendell documents the achievements of Robinson, who confidently sprints toward home plate. An epilogue highlights Robinson's induction into the Baseball Hall of Fame alongside Rickey and Reese; Wendell becoming the first African American member of the Baseball Writers' Association of America; and the annual commemoration of Robinson's achievements, in which all players wear his number, 42, which remains retired across baseball. Inspired, a young Ed Charles later played for the 1969 World Series champion "Miracle Mets".

== Cast ==
- Chadwick Boseman as Jackie Robinson
- Harrison Ford as Branch Rickey, owner of the Brooklyn Dodgers
- Nicole Beharie as Rachel Robinson
- Christopher Meloni as Leo Durocher, the Dodgers manager who supported Robinson but was later suspended
- André Holland as Wendell Smith, a black sportswriter who supports Robinson
- Alan Tudyk as Ben Chapman
- Lucas Black as Pee Wee Reese
- Hamish Linklater as Ralph Branca, starting pitcher
- Brett Cullen as Clay Hopper
- Ryan Merriman as Dixie Walker
- Brad Beyer as Kirby Higbe
- Gino Anthony Pesi as Joe Garagiola
- T. R. Knight as Harold Parrott, a Dodgers staff member
- Max Gail as Burt Shotton
- Toby Huss as Clyde Sukeforth
- James Pickens Jr. as Mr. Brock
- Mark Harelik as Herb Pennock
- Derek Phillips as Bobby Bragan
- Jesse Luken as Eddie Stanky
- John C. McGinley as Red Barber, sports announcer
- Dusan Brown as young Ed Charles
- Linc Hand as Fritz Ostermueller
- Matt Clark as Luther
- Peter MacKenzie as Happy Chandler
- C. J. Nitkowski as Dutch Leonard

== Production ==
=== Initial development ===
Spike Lee planned to write and direct The Jackie Robinson Story based on the life of Jackie Robinson and had it set up at Turner Pictures under his 40 Acres and a Mule Filmworks in 1995. The studio wanted to release it in 1997 to coincide with the 50th anniversary of Robinson's breaking of the color barrier, and courted Denzel Washington to star, but the project fell apart in 1996 over creative differences. In March 1997, Lee found favor with Columbia Pictures, who signed him to a three-year first-look deal. Columbia President Amy Pascal reflected that it would bring "enormous potential for Spike to reach audiences that are not traditionally associated with Spike Lee movies." The project eventually fell apart due to difficulties securing funding, a script, and a lead actor. In 2004 Robert Redford set up a separate biopic as producer with Deep River Productions, as well as his own production company, Wildwood Productions. Redford also intended to co-star as Branch Rickey, and Howard Baldwin joined as producer the following year.

=== Resurgence ===
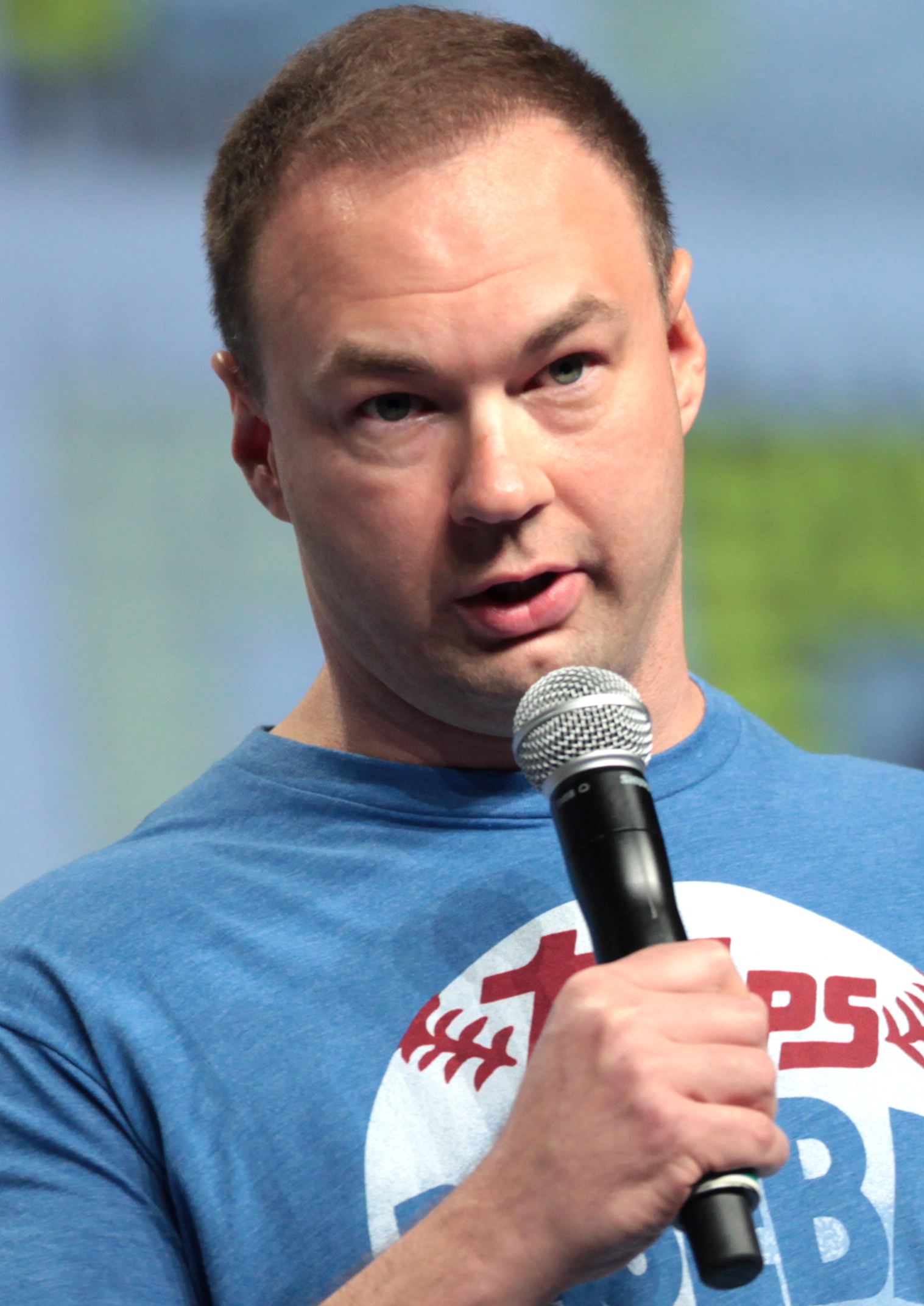
Thomas Tull in 2014

In June 2011, it was announced that Legendary Pictures would develop and produce a Jackie Robinson biopic with Brian Helgeland on board to write and direct, under a distribution deal with Warner Bros. Pictures. He was approached by producer Thomas Tull about a potential Jackie Robinson biopic. Helgeland, who had previously worked with Tull, received the call while on a bus trip to New York with his father. During the conversation, he noticed a billboard featuring Robinson's image with the message "Character: Pass it On", which he later described as "a moment of serendipity" that solidified his interest in the project.

Three days later, after reading Robinson's autobiography, Helgeland met with Robinson's widow, Rachel Robinson, to present his vision for the film. While Rachel initially envisioned a cradle-to-grave portrayal covering Robinson's life beyond baseball, Helgeland proposed focusing on a specific period—Robinson's transition from the Negro leagues in 1945 through his rookie season with the Brooklyn Dodgers in the 1947 season. Rachel agreed to the plan and described Robinson's physical traits and personality, as well as the depth of their relationship. "She told me how disciplined he was, how adamant he was about not drinking, and how opinionated he was", Boseman shared.

Helgeland prioritized accurate depictions of baseball sequences, avoiding what he viewed as overly choreographed action seen in some sports films. He studied past baseball movies and cited The Bad News Bears as a standout for its naturalistic portrayal of the sport's emotional and unifying elements. Rachel had previously been involved with Redford's project.

=== Casting and preproduction ===
Boseman's breakthrough role came with 42, in which he portrayed the lead role of Robinson. When asked about Robinson and Rachel, Helgeland emphasized the importance that the actors "be accepted at once by the audience." He found it tricky for "someone famous to play someone else famous".

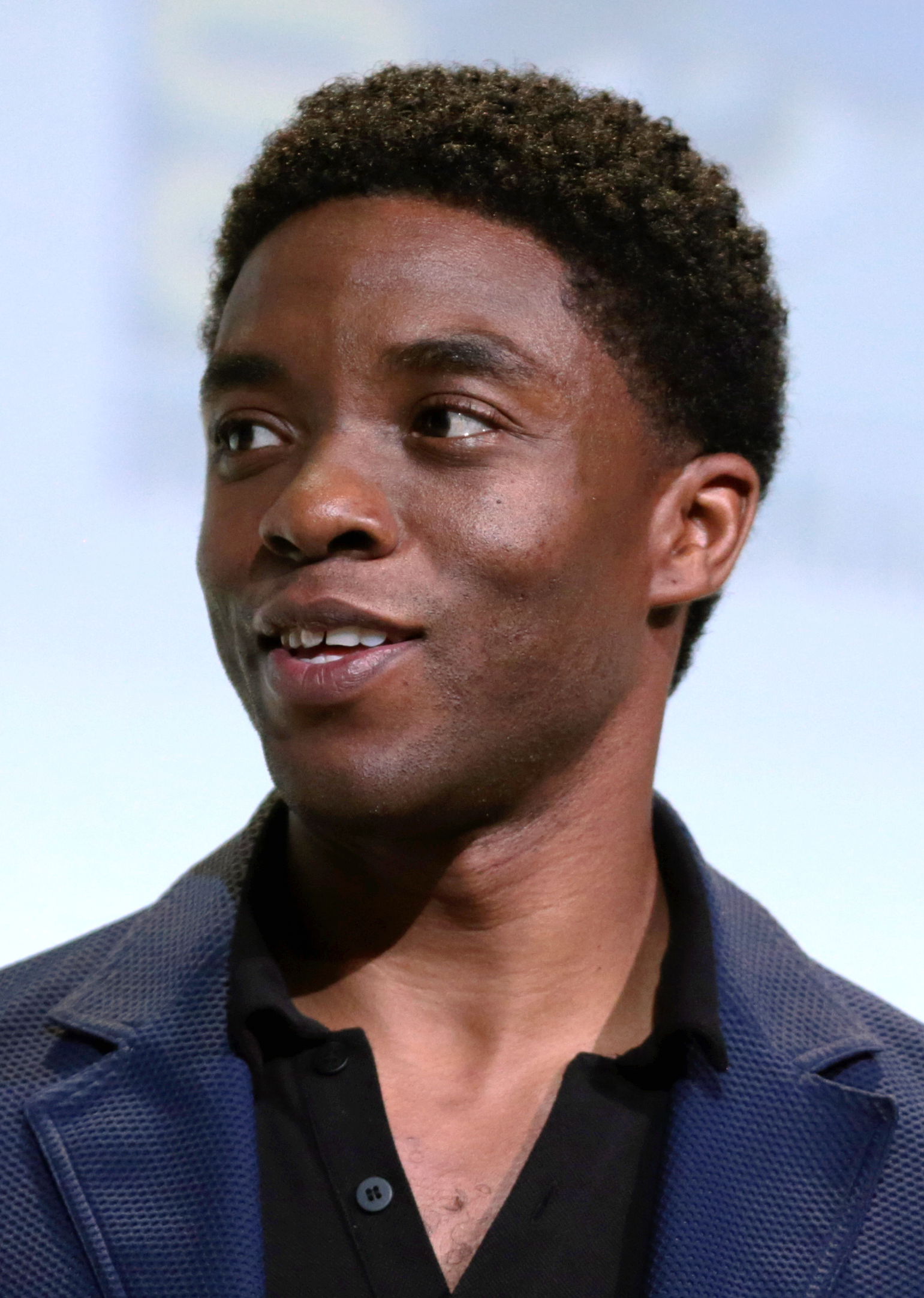
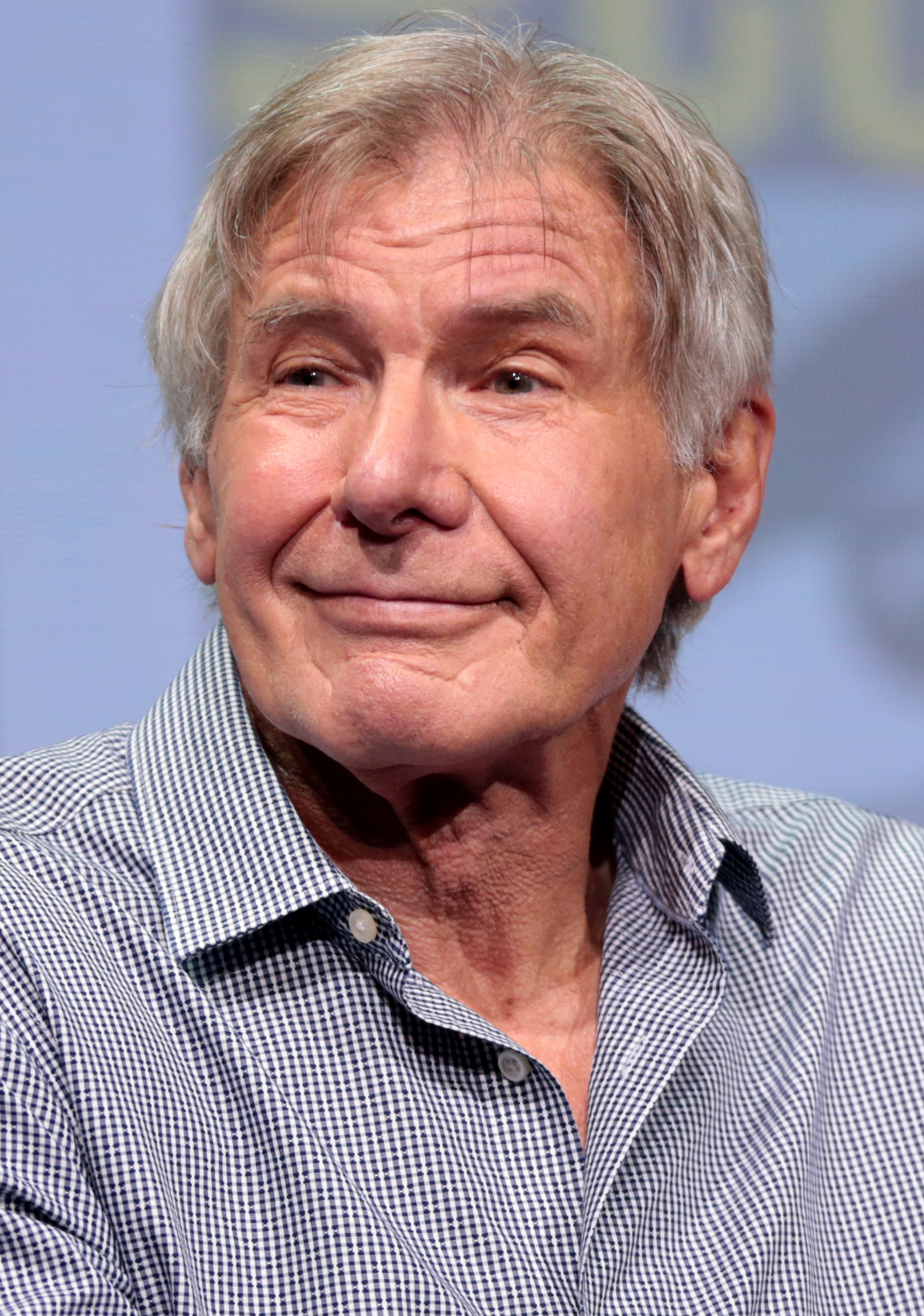
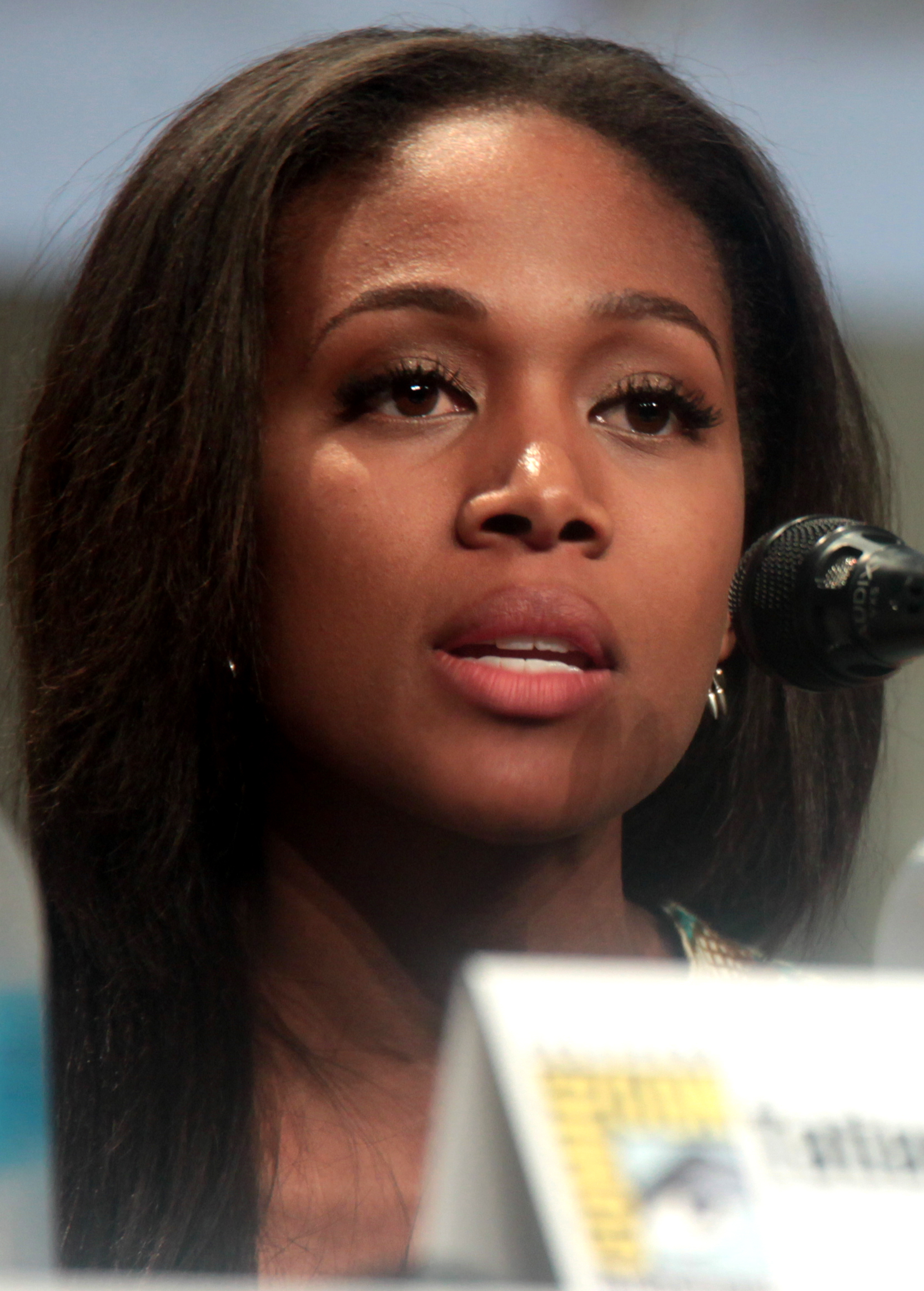
(L to R) Chadwick Boseman (pictured in 2016), Harrison Ford (2017), and Nicole Beharie (2014)

Boseman had been directing an off-Broadway play in the East Village when he auditioned for the role, and was considering giving up acting to pursue directing full-time. About twenty-five other actors had been seriously considered for the role, but director Brian Helgeland liked Boseman's bravery in choosing to read the most difficult scene, in which Robinson goes down a stadium tunnel and breaks a bat in anger, and cast him after he had auditioned twice. Part of the audition process involved playing baseball; Boseman had been involved with Little League as a child but was primarily a basketball player growing up, saying that in this part the casting directors likely noticed his athleticism rather than specifically baseball skills.

Rachel commented that Boseman's performance was like seeing her husband again. To replicate Robinson's mannerisms, Boseman trained for five months with professional baseball coaches, noting they "would tape [his] practices every few weeks, and they would basically split-screen [his technique] with [Robinson's]" to allow him to compare. After having portrayed football player Floyd Little in The Express, Boseman was encouraged by stunt coordinator Allan Graf to approach running bases in the same way, as Robinson had also been a college football player. Upon taking the role, Boseman first spoke with Rachel Robinson, which he said was of great help in discovering the character. Boseman met Hank Aaron, whose career briefly overlapped with Robinson's. Aaron shared his experiences with racial adversity in baseball, helping Boseman deepen his understanding of the role. When Aaron visited the set, Boseman said it felt as if Robinson himself were there.

Initially, Helgeland was hesitant to cast Ford, seeking a character actor for the role of Rickey. However, Ford's persistence and dedication to the role, including studying Rickey's life and adopting significant physical transformations, won Helgeland over. Ford's commitment to embodying Rickey involved wearing a fat suit, prosthetics, and mastering Rickey's distinctive voice and mannerisms. He researched Rickey's life, listened to recordings from the Baseball Hall of Fame, and worked with a voice coach to capture Rickey's distinct speech. "I loved the language of the guy, I loved his style," Ford noted. In a 2023 interview with James Hibberd of The Hollywood Reporter, Ford said Branch Rickey is one of his roles he is most proud of.

Nicole Beharie, who portrayed Rachel Robinson in 42, described her journey into acting as somewhat haphazard, influenced by her lively family. A Juilliard graduate, she was familiar with Robinson's historical significance but was unaware of the depth of his struggles and the profound impact he had beyond baseball; Beharie compared him to a "godfather of Barack Obama". In preparation for her role, Beharie had the opportunity to meet Rachel, who visited the set, provided insights, and shared personal details about her life and relationship with Jackie. Beharie recalled spending evenings speaking with Rachel and reading letters exchanged between Jackie and Rachel while he was on the road, describing their correspondence as "the most incredible love story" and a key element that drew her to the role.

"When you're doing a character, you want to know the full landscape. You want to know them spiritually, mentally and physically. So I asked [Rachel Robinson]: were there any physical things that he did that stood out. We sat down for hours and talked about his personality and what his tendencies were"... The way [Jackie Robinson] stood, and the way he held his hands in the backfield...all of those physical things I tried to do".

— Boseman telling Essence about his talks with Rachel Robinson

=== Filming and special effects ===
In the spring of 2012, Engel Stadium in Chattanooga, Tennessee, served as a stand-in for Ebbets Field in Brooklyn, New York. Filming at the stadium began on April 21, 2012. Some interior scenes were shot at Atlanta Film Studios Paulding County in Hiram, Georgia. 42 was partially filmed in historic Rickwood Field in Birmingham, Alabama, serving as a stand-in for several major and minor league ballparks. The Tutwiler Hotel was also used to depict Philadelphia's Ben Franklin Hotel in a scene where the Brooklyn Dodgers were turned away due to Robinson's race. The production hired between 600 and 700 local extras during its filming in Alabama. The filming of 42 was a significant economic boost for Chattanooga, with an estimated $5 million injected into the local economy. Filming in Chattanooga marked the longest-running and largest-budget production the city had hosted at that time, surpassing previous Hollywood projects such as Water for Elephants and Deliverance.

Supervising art director Thomas Hoover and the visual effects team, led by Jamie Dixon of Hammerhead, utilized historical research, scanned architectural drawings, and digital modeling to construct a 1,200-foot-long, 40-foot-high green screen for scenes set in Ebbets Field. The visual effects team digitally rendered the outfield and portions of the infield. Engel Stadium was used as the foundation for the recreation, as it was one of the oldest existing ballparks and had historical ties to Robinson. The production adapted the structure by modifying its layout to match Ebbets Field's dimensions, adjusting the infield angles, and reconstructing key elements such as the dugout, scoreboard, and fences. In addition to Engel Stadium, the film used Luther Williams Field in Macon, Georgia, and Rickwood Field in Birmingham, Alabama, both of which had connections to Robinson's career. Engel Stadium also served as a stand-in for Crosley Field in Cincinnati.

Boseman's deep character study enabled him to note when his stunt double was playing Robinson incorrectly, and he insisted on doing his own stunts, but former minor league player Jasha Balcom was Boseman's stunt double for some scenes. Using old photographs and stadium blueprints, Shibe Park, The Polo Grounds, Sportsman's Park, and Forbes Field were also recreated for the film using digital imagery. To create the final crowd scenes, the visual effects team used inflatable mannequins in the stands as placeholders. These were later replaced with digital composites of individual fans, each filmed against a blue screen. The entire field was also altered: the infield and home plate were relocated, while the scoreboard and outfield advertisements were digitally recreated. The remaining areas of the field were shot against a green screen to allow for the digital addition of the stadium stands. Extras, many of whom were local residents, filled roles as players and other period-specific figures. After filming wrapped in Chattanooga in June, the green screen setup around Engel Stadium remained in place for weeks in case additional shots were needed. The green billboards were torn down later.

=== Music ===
42's soundtrack features an orchestral score composed by Mark Isham who developed the main themes through piano at his in-built studio in his house. The score had emphasis on French horns and solo trumpet, being the voice of Robinson. WaterTower Music released the score album on April 9, 2013, along with an accompanying soundtrack that featured the songs heard in the film. Bilge Ebiri of Vulture called it as "predictably twinkly, treacly score" while noting the presence of four musical crescendos in the first fifteen minutes.

== Release ==
=== Marketing ===
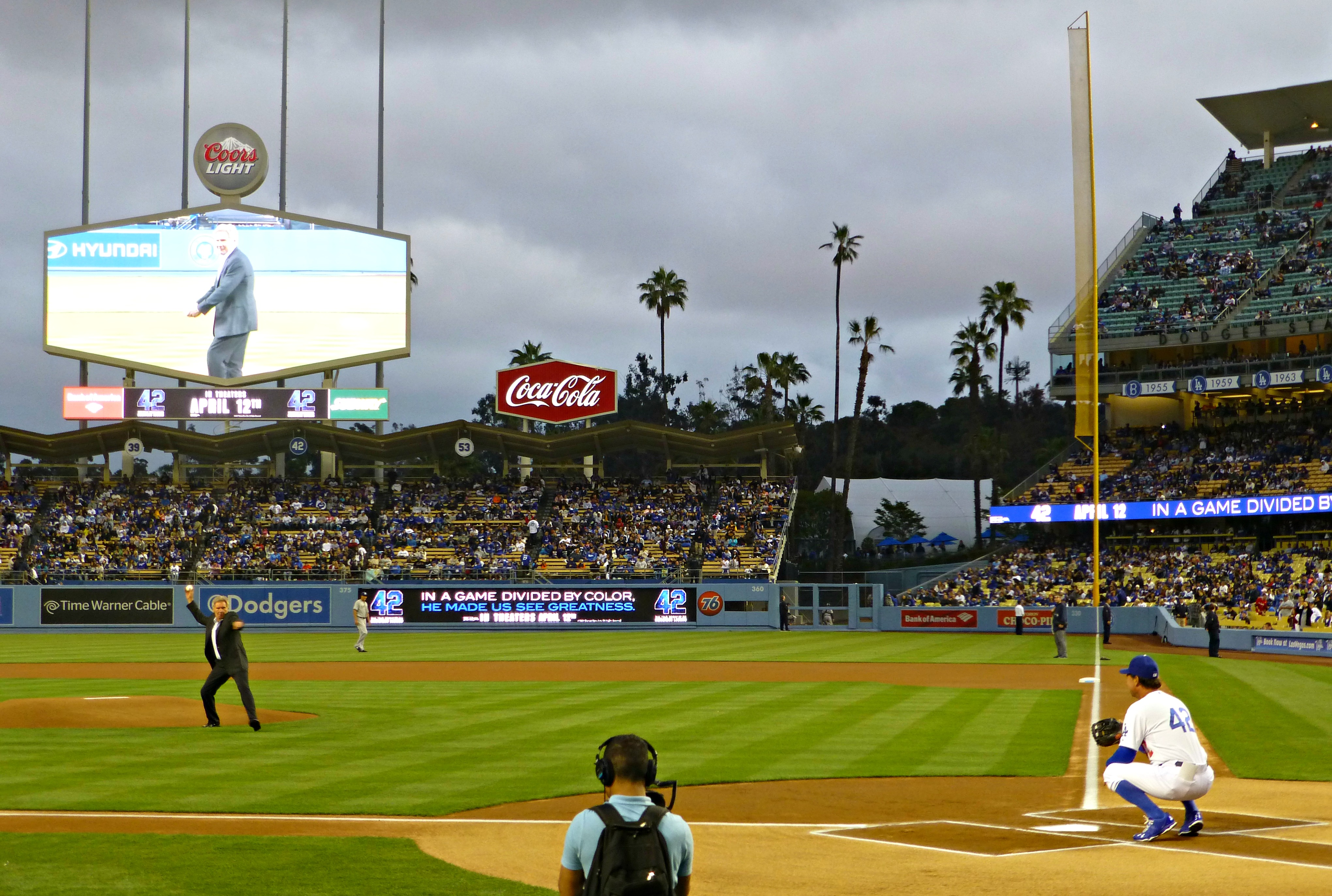
Harrison Ford throws a pitch to Don Mattingly at Dodger Stadium, April 15, 2013. (Jackie Robinson Day)

Marriott International collaborated with Warner Bros. to promote Marriott Rewards, the company's loyalty program, to African American audiences. On February 25, 2013, Marriott launched a month-long sweepstakes on Facebook offering daily prizes, including tickets to 42 and a grand prize of an all-expenses-paid trip to the film's premiere on April 9, 2013, in Los Angeles. A special trailer for 42 featuring Chadwick Boseman was shown on LodgeNet entertainment systems in over 1,000 Marriott Hotels across the United States. Key cards distributed at Marriott hotels in 11 cities, including New York City, Philadelphia, and Los Angeles, featured promotional materials about the Facebook contest. Marriott also hosted exclusive screenings of 42 for members of its loyalty program in Boston, Chicago, Houston, San Francisco, and Phoenix.

On April 15, 2013, Jackie Robinson Day was celebrated at Dodger Stadium. During the Los Angeles Dodgers game against the San Diego Padres, the film's trailer was shown on the stadium's video boards. Kelley Jakle, a cast member of the film and the great-granddaughter of Branch Rickey, performed "God Bless America". Harrison Ford and Boseman, along with other cast members of 42, participated in pre-game ceremonies and media interviews at Dodger Stadium. Ford threw the game's ceremonial first pitch.

The 30 teams of Major League Baseball organized private screenings for thousands of students from eighth to twelfth grade across the United States and Canada. Commissioner Bud Selig hosted the first screening in Milwaukee, joined by Jackie Robinson's daughter, Sharon Robinson. Selig described the film as depicting "the proudest moment in baseball history" and emphasized its role in educating future generations about Robinson's impact on the nation.

=== White House ===
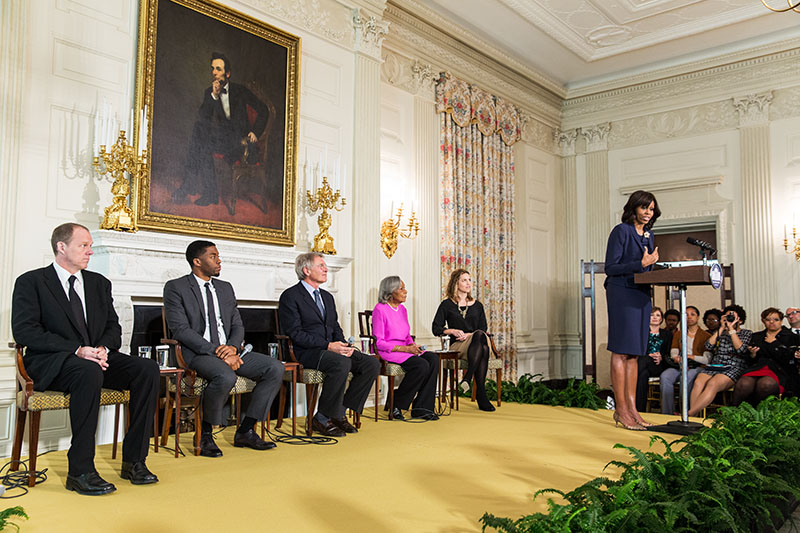
Cast members in the State Dining Room of the White House with Michelle Obama, April 2013

On April 2, 2013, First Lady Michelle Obama hosted a screening of the film in the White House's State Dining Room for 80 students from high schools and universities across the United States. A question-and-answer session featured Robinson's widow Rachel, and members of the cast and crew, including Boseman, Ford, and director-screenwriter Brian Helgeland. Michelle noted that both she and President Barack Obama found the film "very powerful" and encouraged students to recognize that success requires perseverance rather than innate talent. According to ESPN, Michelle gave 42 a glowing review.

=== Premiere ===
42 premiered at TCL Chinese Theatre in Los Angeles, on April 9, 2013. People present included cast members, Rachel, rapper Big Sean, actresses Naya Rivera and Calista Flockhart, and football player Bill Cowher. 42 also premiered at AMC Barry Woods Theater in Kansas City on April 11, 2013, a day before its nationwide release on April 12 by Warner Bros., as a benefit for the Negro Leagues Baseball Museum. Boseman, Ford, and Robinson's son David were present in the premiere; Ford participated in the fundraiser.

== Reception ==
=== Box office ===
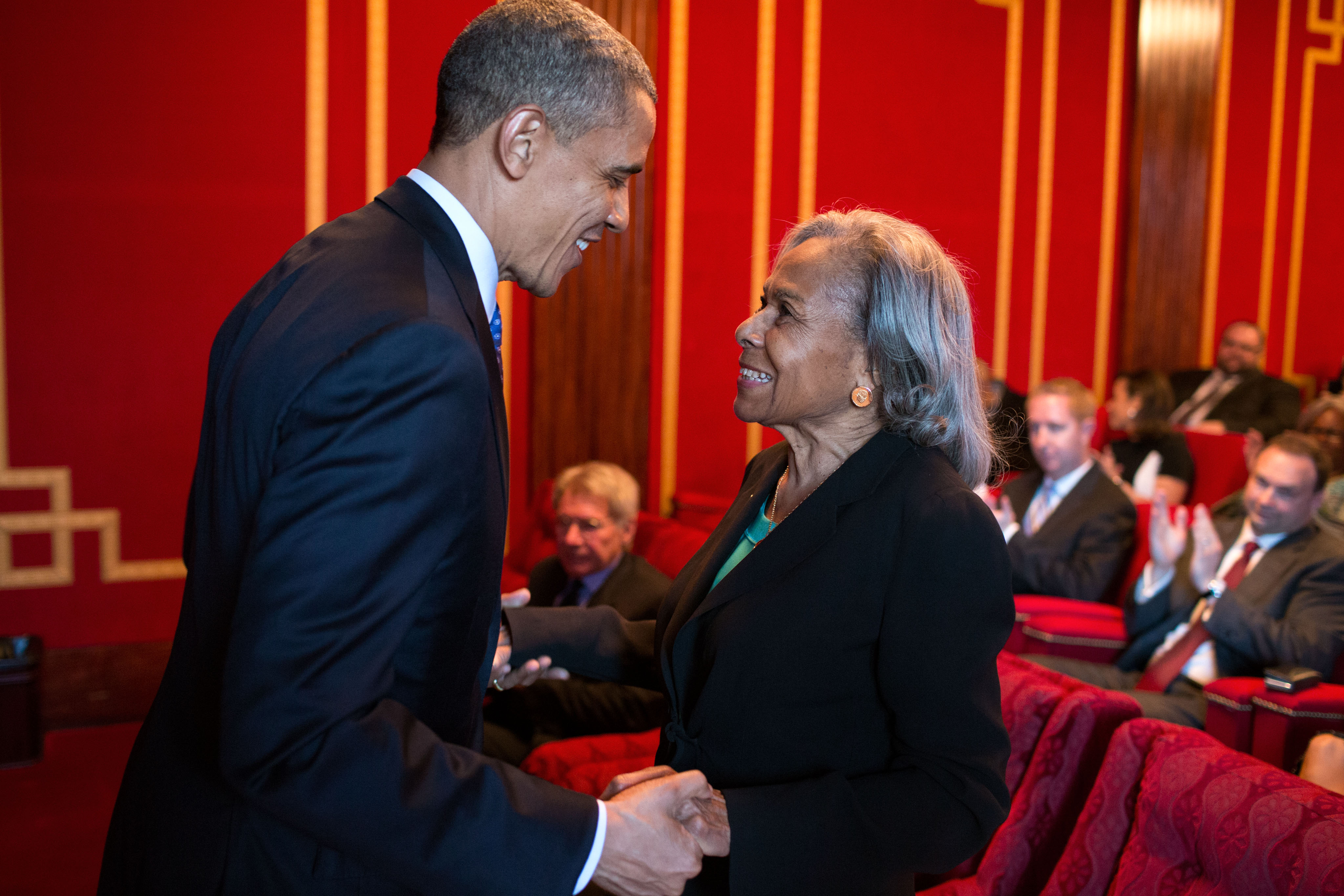
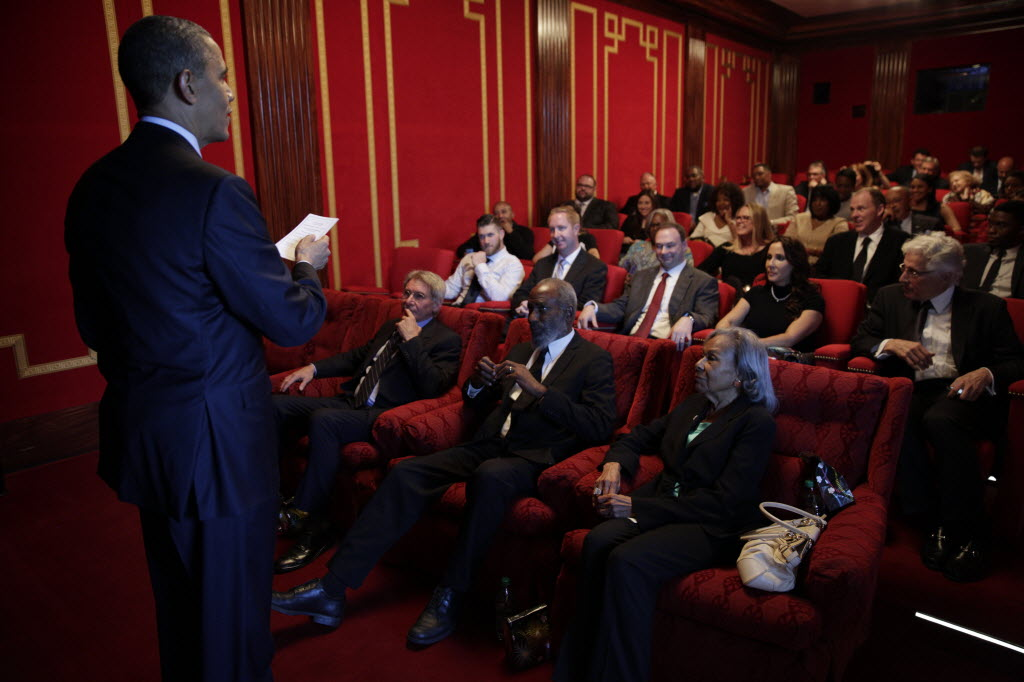
Barack Obama talks with Rachel Robinson, hosting a screening of 42 with Robinson family members, cast, and crew in the White House Family Theater, April 2, 2013.

42 grossed $95 million in the United States and $2.5 million in other territories, for a worldwide total of $97.5 million, against a production budget of $40 million. The film earned $27.3-27.5 million for its opening weekend, the best-ever debut for a baseball-themed film. This surpassed the previous highest opening of $19.6 million set by The Benchwarmers (2006) and Moneyball's $19.5 million (2011). 42 then made $17.7 million and $10.7 million on its second and third weekends, finishing second and third, respectively.

Of the film's opening, Forbes said "not only is that the biggest baseball opening weekend on record, it's the biggest baseball-themed opening weekend even when adjusted for inflation." The film's opening was especially positive for Warner Bros., which had seen disappointing performances from previous films like Bullet to the Head, Beautiful Creatures, and The Incredible Burt Wonderstone, each of which had earned under $25 million in the United States. 42 had a 3.0x weekend multiplier; the audience demographic was skewed towards 52% male and 83% aged 25 and older, indicating a mature audience. The film was expected to maintain strong box office performance through April, thought to surpass $100 million. Additionally, 42 was anticipated to have a significant post-theatrical life due to continued airing on networks like TNT. Forbes also noted that 42 faced a significant disparity in box office revenues due to the limited international appeal of baseball films, with most of its earnings coming from the U.S. Despite Robinson's status as an American sports and civil rights icon, the intricacies of baseball and his historical significance did not resonate as strongly with foreign audiences, leading to a minimal overseas release and low international ticket sales.

=== Home media ===
42 was released on DVD and Blu-ray on July 16, 2013. The DVD release sold 1.3 million units ($18 million), becoming the 33rd highest-grossing of 2013 in the United States by units sold.

=== Critical response ===
On Rotten Tomatoes, 42 holds an approval rating of 81% based on 195 reviews, with an average rating of 6.90/10. The website's critics consensus reads, "42 is an earnest, inspirational, and respectfully told biography of an influential American sports icon, though it might be a little too safe and old-fashioned for some." On Metacritic, the film holds a weighted average score of 62 out of 100, based on 40 critics, indicating "generally favorable" reviews. Audiences polled by CinemaScore gave the film a rare "A+" grade.

"It was important to me because I wanted it to be an authentic piece. I wanted to get it right. I didn't want them to make him an angry black man or some stereotype, so it was important for me to be in there. ... I love the movie. I'm pleased with it. It's authentic and it's also very powerful."

— Rachel Robinson on the end result of 42 for Fox Sports

Richard Roeper wrote, "This is a competent but mostly unexceptional film about a most extraordinary man." Lisa Kennedy, of the Denver Post, lauded the film, saying "This story inspires and entertains with a vital chapter in this nation's history." Conversely, Peter Rainer of The Christian Science Monitor, criticized the film as "TV-movie-of-the-week dull", noting the "exclusion of virtually everything else in [Robinson's] life." The film's actors were generally praised, with Owen Gleiberman saying of Ford, "He gives an ingeniously stylized cartoon performance, his eyes atwinkle, his mouth a rubbery grin". The Hollywood Reporter commented that Boseman "has the necessary appeal, proves convincing as an athlete and is expressive in spite of the fact that the man he's playing must mostly keep his true feelings bottled up." Geoff Boucher of Entertainment Weekly noted that Alan Tudyk's portrayal of Phillies manager Ben Chapman in 42 "put a face to the racism" Robinson endured, showing how prejudice was often delivered with a smirk as much as a scowl. In a positive review, Ann Hornaday of The Washington Post referenced the scene of racial unity between Pee Wee Reese (Lucas Black) and Robinson as emblematic of 42's "cumulative, undeniable momentum".

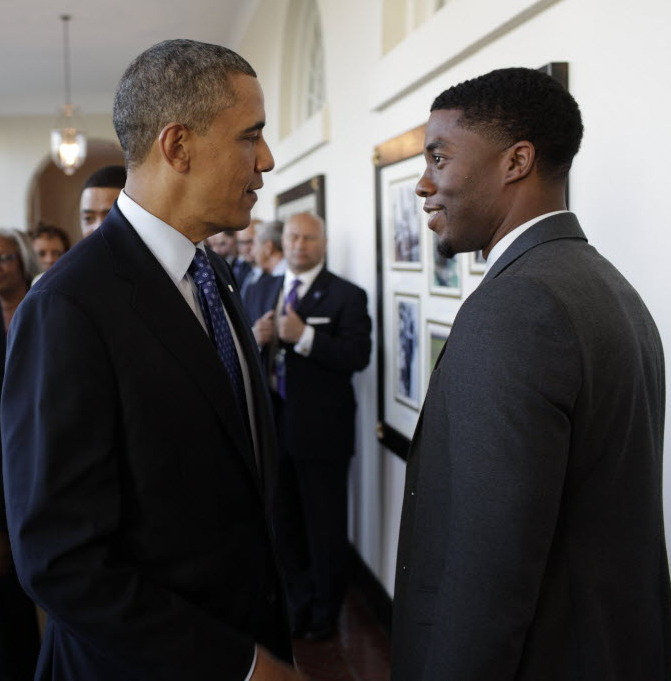
Obama greets Boseman in the East Room, April 2, 2013.

Critics, even those who viewed the film negatively, felt that Boseman being a relatively unknown actor was a benefit when playing an icon and an athlete; Mick LaSalle of San Francisco Chronicle wrote that "as [...] played by Chadwick Boseman, Robinson is a hero we can recognize", and Mary Pols for Time said that "Boseman is not a hugely close physical match to Robinson, except for perhaps in the power he conveys, but he's a great choice to play the ball player". The Guardian's Mike McCahill noted that "Boseman hits his key scenes out of the park", but felt the film would not interest people who are not baseball fans, with Dana Stevens of Slate suggesting that the film made black history "squeaky-clean" and did both Robinson and Boseman's performance as him a disservice. IndieWire critic Gabe Toro wrote that 42 avoids being "yet another studio film where the white man battles a gauntlet of adversity to allow for a Civil Rights victory."

When writing about Helgeland's past filmography and Boseman's portrayal of Robinson, Scott Foundas of Variety noted, "for all of 42's self-conscious monument building, the cumulative effect is to render its subject markedly smaller and more ordinary than he actually was." Mark Kermode of The Guardian wrote, "It's inspirational fare, although such a remarkable story perhaps deserves a rather more remarkable movie." John Harlt of The Seattle Times described 42 as "a kind of feel-good movie about racism", writing that Helgeland's obsession with dates and places "are problematic", yet that 42 "offers a very good place to start". John Baldoni of Forbes highlighted the raw honesty in the relationship between Robinson and Rickey. He specifically pointed to the pivotal moment when Rickey challenged Robinson to have the strength to endure racist taunts without fighting back.

=== Accolades ===
Award	Category	Subject	Result	Ref.
American Black Film Festival	Most Promising Performer	Chadwick Boseman	Nominated	
Black Reel Awards	Outstanding Breakthrough Performance, Male	Chadwick Boseman	Nominated	
45th NAACP Image Awards	Outstanding Actor in a Motion Picture	Chadwick Boseman	Nominated	
Chicago Film Critics Association Awards 2013	Most Promising Performer	Chadwick Boseman	Nominated	
Satellite Awards	Best Supporting Actor – Motion Picture	Harrison Ford	Nominated	
St. Louis Film Critics Association Awards	Best Supporting Actor	Harrison Ford	Nominated	
San Francisco Film Critics Circle Awards 2013	Best Supporting Actor	Harrison Ford	Nominated	

=== Boseman posthumous ===
Boseman died at his Los Angeles home as a result of complications related to colon cancer on August 28, 2020, at the age of 43. MLB and the Dodgers issued statements honoring Boseman, in light of his acclaimed portrayal of the player. Numerous publications noted Boseman died on the observance of Jackie Robinson Day, (Note: Jackie Robinson Day is April 15, but in 2020 was observed on August 28 due to the COVID-19 pandemic.) seven years after his having portrayed Robinson. Several theater chains, including AMC and Regal, re-released the film in September after Boseman's death. In a statement to The Hollywood Reporter, Ford said "Chadwick Boseman was as compelling, powerful and truthful as the characters he chose to play".

== Analysis ==
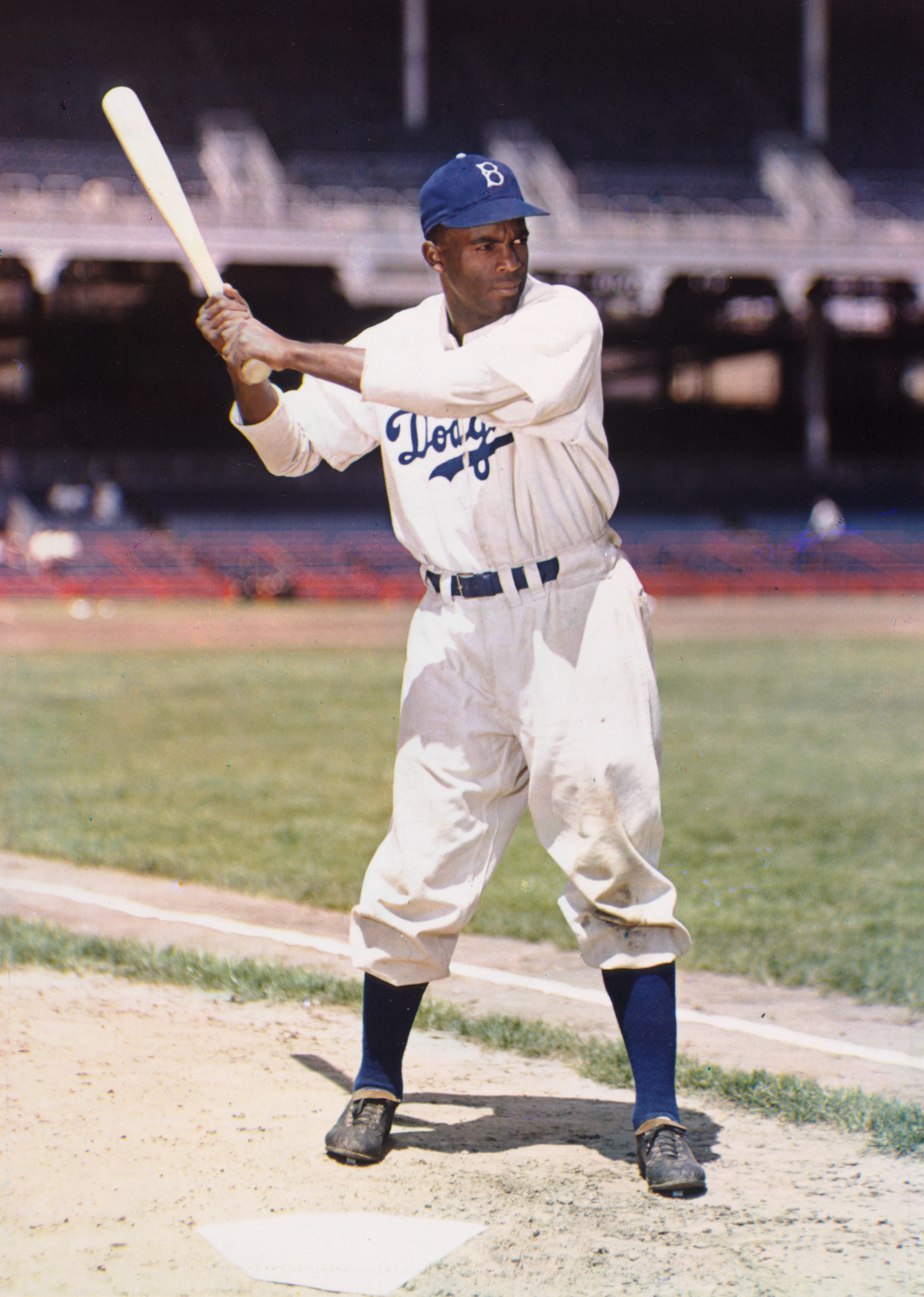
Jackie Robinson in 1947

=== Themes and interpretations ===
A central theme of 42 is integration, particularly Jackie Robinson's entry into Major League Baseball as a challenge to segregation. Signed by Brooklyn Dodgers general manager Branch Rickey, Robinson's presence in the league forces America to confront its racial divisions. Robinson's struggle is met with violent and psychological resistance. Opposing pitchers target him, base runners spike him with their cleats, and he receives death threats against himself and his family. A key moment highlights opposing manager Ben Chapman relentlessly taunting him with racist insults, testing Robinson's ability to endure without retaliation. NPR positions Robinson as a symbol of nonviolent resistance, embodying the philosophy of "turning the other cheek". NPR also noted that 42 portrayed Robinson's integration of Major League Baseball with a high degree of accuracy. Stanford professor and Robinson biographer Arnold Rampersad stated that "fundamentally, the story is accurate".

The scene of Robinson and Pee Wee Reese in Cincinnati has been widely discussed.

Branch Rickey's role in Robinson's career is initially framed as a financial decision, likened to an early form of "moneyball". Robinson's integration also forces his teammates to take a stance. Initially, many resist Dodgers sign a petition against playing with him. Meanwhile, Pee Wee Reese, a white teammate from Kentucky, publicly puts his arm around Robinson in front of a hostile Cincinnati crowd, demonstrating allyship in the face of public racism. According to NPR, the character of Wendell Smith, a black sportswriter assigned to cover Robinson, reflects the role of the press in shaping public perception. Though the film condenses multiple historical figures into Smith's character, it highlights how journalists, including those omitted from the film like Daily Worker writer Lester Rodney, played a crucial role in pushing for integration.

During an intimate talk at the Gene Siskel Film Center, André Holland reflected on his role as Wendell in 42, emphasizing the importance of accurately portraying historical figures. He stated, "If I'm going to play people, real people, I've got to do everything I can to tell the truth about what happened. It's a form of violence, I think, to obscure the truth." Holland had prepared for the role by meeting with Smith's widow to understand his legacy, but he was disappointed when crucial scenes depicting Smith's advocacy for Robinson were cut from the final film. Forbes staff Scott Mendelson noted that the film's African American stars, Boseman and Nicole Beharie, might face challenges in securing high-profile roles in mainstream Hollywood films, citing the limited opportunities for non-white actors in major studio productions. Mendelson further commented on the "glass ceiling" for non-white actors, particularly women, in Hollywood. Nevertheless, the success of 42 highlighted the demand for mainstream films featuring African American talent, with the hope that studios might take note of the film's positive reception.

Ford emphasized the film's broader message, stating that 42 is not just a sports story but a reflection on racial equality in America. "This is a movie about the history of racial equality in the United States, and it makes it visceral history", he said. Helgeland also hoped the film would encourage more positive and diverse portrayals of African Americans in cinema. Boseman highlighted the film's portrayal of a black love story on a major Hollywood platform. He continued, "I realized that I had not seen two black people in love in a major motion picture", hoping 42 would set a precedent for future films. In an interview with the Los Angeles Times Helgeland explained that he deliberately included the racially charged language Robinson faced, particularly in a sequence depicting Philadelphia Phillies manager Ben Chapman's relentless verbal assault on Robinson. "Those words had to be violent", Helgeland said. "If we trivialized it, some people might say, 'Oh, he didn't have it so bad.'" In contrast, Alan Tudyk publicly shared his discomfort over the language of Chapman's character.

=== Accuracy ===
SB Nation noted inaccuracies in Ed Charles's age and interaction with Robinson while in Daytona Beach, as well as the purported home run by Robinson in what is supposedly the Dodgers' pennant-clinching victory. Pirates pitcher Fritz Ostermueller threw left-handed, not right-handed as in the film. His first-inning pitch hit Robinson on the left wrist, not his head, and he claimed it was a routine brushback pitch without racist intent. There was no fight on the mound afterwards.

== See also ==
- List of black films of the 2010s
- List of sports films
- List of baseball films
