= Growing Up and Other Lies =

- Film poster
- Directed by: Darren Grodsky; Danny Jacobs
- Written by: Darren Grodsky; Danny Jacobs
- Produced by: Nicole Lederman; Katie Mustard; Jason Weiss
- Starring: Adam Brody; Wyatt Cenac; Danny Jacobs; Josh Lawson; Amber Tamblyn
- Cinematography: Christopher Baffa
- Edited by: Josh Noyes
- Music by: Fil Eisler; Philip Klein
- Production companies: Embark Productions; GoldApple Entertainment
- Distributed by: Entertainment One
- Release date: March 20, 2015
- Running time: 90 minutes
- Country: United States
- Language: English

Growing Up and Other Lies is a 2015 American comedy film written and directed by Darren Grodsky and Danny Jacobs and starring Adam Brody, Wyatt Cenac, Jacobs, Josh Lawson and Amber Tamblyn.

After being in New York City for years, first as a student, later as a struggling artist, Jake has decided to give up and return home to Ohio. He convinces his three oldest friends (and former roommates) to help him have their greatest adventure together on his last day in the city: a walk down the 260 blocks of Manhattan.

Revisiting spots in an attempt to relive the glory of their youth doesn't go quite as planned. Over the course of the day, old conflicts resurface, Jake hunts down his ex-girlfriend and each of them face their own crises of manhood.

== Cast ==
- Adam Brody as Rocks
- Wyatt Cenac as Gunderson
- Danny Jacobs as Billy
- Josh Lawson as Jake
- Amber Tamblyn as Tabatha
- Lauren Miller as Emma

== Release ==
The film was released in theaters and via video-on-demand on March 20, 2015.

== Reception ==
The film has an 8% rating on Rotten Tomatoes. S. Jhoanna Robledo of Common Sense Media awarded the film two stars out of five. Anthony Salveggi of Paste gave it a rating of 5.8. Mike D'Angelo of The A.V. Club graded the film a C.

Justin Lowe of The Hollywood Reporter gave the film a negative review and wrote "Intermittently amusing but rarely as funny as it wants to be, this low-budget indie will find its best fit on digital platforms."
