= A Quiet Place: Day One (soundtrack) =

2024 film soundtrack album

A Quiet Place: Day One (Music from the Motion Picture)

Film score by Alexis Grapsas
- Released: June 28, 2024
- Recorded: 2024
- Genre: Film score
- Length: 72:44
- Labels: Milan; Paramount
- Producer: Alexis Grapsas

Alexis Grapsas chronology
Pig (2021)	A Quiet Place: Day One (2024)	What We Hide (2025)

A Quiet Place: Day One (Music from the Motion Picture) is the film score composed by Alexis Grapsas to the 2024 film A Quiet Place: Day One directed by Michael Sarnoski which served as the third installment in the A Quiet Place film series, and a prequel spinoff of the first film, starring Lupita Nyong'o and Joseph Quinn. The album featuring 27 tracks was released through Milan Records and Paramount Music on June 28, 2024.

== Background ==
Alexis Grapsas renewed his association with Sarnoski after Pig (2021) for Day One. Instead of focusing on horror tropes, he prioritized on utilizing the emotional journey of the protagonists Sam and Eric, and for Sam's theme, they used a custom-made baritone violin and woodwinds to create an "intimate, breathy" sound. One of the major challenges was to maintain the film's silent and tense atmosphere while using music for emotional storytelling which Grapsas had to navigate that by leaving middle frequencies for essential sound effects or using silence as an integral element.Sarnoski frequently challenged Grapsas to experiment with sound, which include the repurposition of the dark and growling monster theme into a softer, reversed variation to underscore emotional moments between characters as well as linking the horror and human elements in a unique way. Grapsas refrained from heavily relying on plugged-in audio effects and synthesized music, and preferred to work with live musicians so that they could find raw sounds that fit the specific character needs of the film. Because of the editing was ongoing, the final score was written and recorded at the Abbey Road Studios in London in early May.

== Release ==
The soundtrack to Day One was released through Milan Records and Paramount Music on June 28, 2024.

== Reception ==
Filmtracks wrote "the score is a win overall for Grapsas, who delivers the needed goods in his major mainstream cinematic debut." Richard Lawson of Vanity Fair wrote "The score, by Alexis Grapsas, lilts and swells around them, adding further emotional dimension to an already disarmingly contemplative film." an eerie and intense score by Alexis Grapsas". David Rooney of The Hollywood Reporter called it a "relatively minimalist score" being discreetly used to attain minimalism.

== Track listing ==
No.	Title	Length
1.	"90 Decibels"	0:52
2.	"Samira's Theme"	3:08
3.	"Marionette"	2:08
4.	"Subway Tunnels (Monster Theme)"	3:38
5.	"Revolving Door"	1:54
6.	"Months, Days, Hours"	3:29
7.	"Day One"	2:14
8.	"You Can Hear It When You're Quiet (Final Suite)"	6:06
9.	"Silence Is Survival"	3:08
10.	"Manhattan Crowd Chaos"	3:24
11.	"The Magic Trick"	2:23
12.	"Memories of Father in Harlem"	2:30
13.	"Burning Bridges"	3:30
14.	"Run to the Boats"	2:07
15.	"Make No Noise"	3:43
16.	"Not Before We Get Pizza"	5:23
17.	"Quiet Friendship"	2:28
18.	"Learning the Rules"	3:33
19.	"Shelter Near Water"	2:49
20.	"They Are Attracted to Sound"	2:56
21.	"Stop Following Me"	2:07
22.	"Dead Silent"	2:55
23.	"A Quiet City"	2:07
24.	"Underwater Chase"	2:06
25.	"Bringing Her Home (Bonus Track)"	2:06
Total length:		72:44

== Accolades ==
Award	Date of ceremony	Category	Recipient(s) and nominee(s)	Result	Ref.
BMI Film & TV Awards	May 15, 2025	Theatrical Film Awards	Alexis Grapsas	Won	
Hollywood Music In Media Awards	November 20, 2024	Original Score – Horror/Thriller Film	Alexis Grapsas	Nominated	
