= André Holland =

American actor (born 1979)

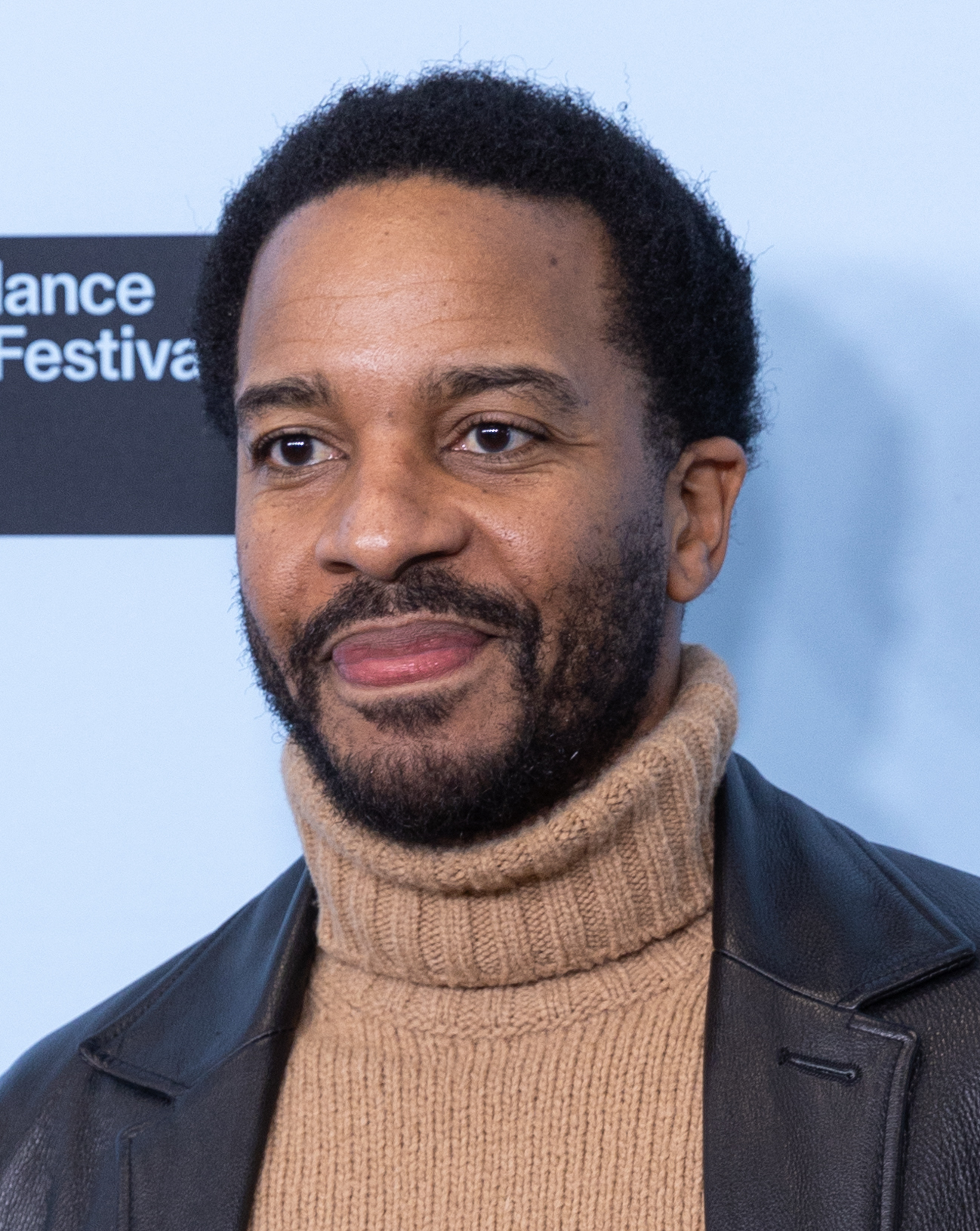
- Holland at the 2025 Sundance Film Festival
- Born: December 28, 1979 (age 46); Bessemer, Alabama, U.S.
- Education: Florida State University (BFA); New York University (MFA)
- Occupation: Actor
- Years active: 2006–present

André Holland (born December 28, 1979) is an American actor. He is widely known for his 2016 performance as Kevin in the Academy Award-winning film Moonlight.

Holland has acted in film, television, and theatre productions. He starred as Dr. Algernon Edwards in the Cinemax series The Knick (2014–2015) and as Matt Miller in the FX series American Horror Story: Roanoke (2016). He portrayed politician and activist Andrew Young in the 2014 film Selma and sportswriter Wendell Smith in the 2013 film 42. On stage, he has starred in August Wilson's play Jitney on Broadway in 2017. He plays a lead role on the 2020 Netflix musical drama series The Eddy, directed by Damien Chazelle, and Henry Matthew Deaver in the first season of Castle Rock.

== Early life and education ==
André Holland was born on December 28, 1979 in Bessemer, Alabama and grew up there. He graduated from John Carroll Catholic High School in Birmingham. His first stage performance was in a production of Oliver! at the Birmingham Summerfest Theatre, at the age of eleven.

He attended Florida State University and studied abroad at the FSU London study centre during his time there. He also received a Master of Fine Arts degree from New York University in 2006.

== Career ==
=== 2006–2015: Early work ===
Holland's first on-screen performance was in an episode of Law & Order in 2006. Around this time, Holland began to perform more regularly on stage as well. In 2006, he portrayed three characters in the play Blue Door. Charles Isherwood of The New York Times gave his performance a positive review.

In 2008, he played Eric in the play Wig Out! and took his first film role in the sports drama Sugar. The following year, he portrayed Elegba and Marcus in The Brother/Sister Plays. In 2010, he was cast in the Matthew Lopez play The Whipping Man, for which he won the Vivian Robinson/Audelco Award for Best Supporting Actor.

In 2011, he starred as Julian "Fitz" Fitzgerald in several episodes of the NBC sitcom Friends with Benefits. In 2013, he portrayed Wendell Smith in the film 42. In 2014, he portrayed Andrew Young in Ava DuVernay's historical drama film Selma. For his performance, he was nominated for the NAACP Image Award for Outstanding Supporting Actor in a Motion Picture.

From 2014 to 2015, he starred in a supporting role opposite Clive Owen in the Cinemax original drama series The Knick.

=== 2016: Moonlight ===
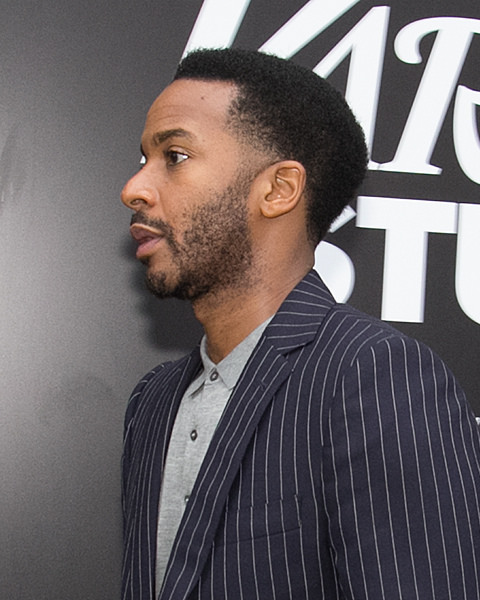
Holland at the 2016 Toronto International Film Festival

In 2016, he achieved widespread notice for his performance as Kevin in Barry Jenkins' drama film Moonlight, for which he received critical acclaim and numerous accolades. The film won several Academy Awards, including Best Picture, at the 89th annual ceremony.

Holland's performance was singled out by some film critics, including those at Rolling Stone and GQ, who dubbed him a "standout" in the film. As a member of the film's ensemble cast, he received a nomination for Outstanding Performance by a Cast in a Motion Picture at the 23rd Screen Actors Guild Awards. He also received nominations for Best Supporting Actor from the Florida Film Critics Circle and Outstanding Supporting Actor at the Black Reel Awards.

=== 2017–present ===
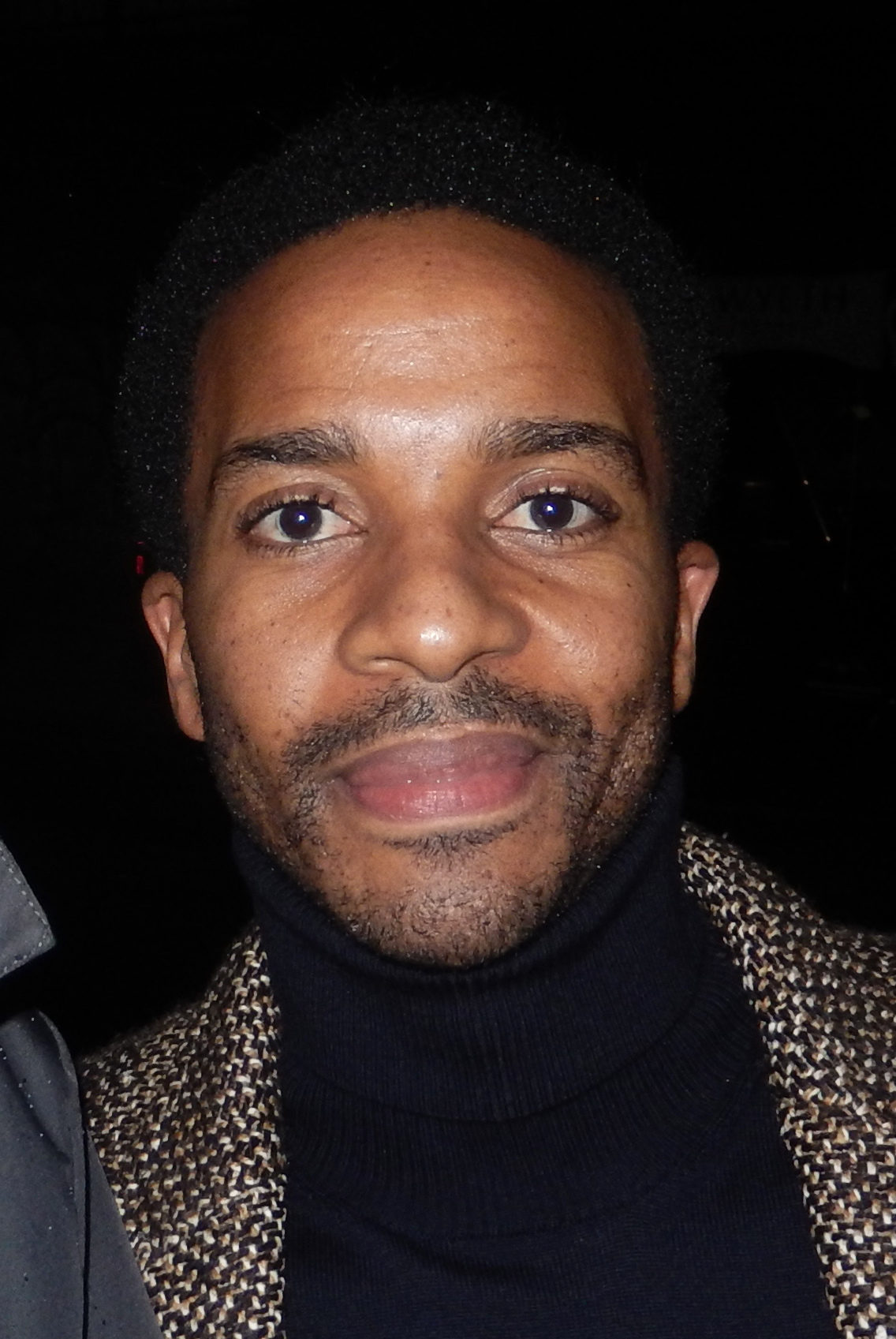
Holland in 2019

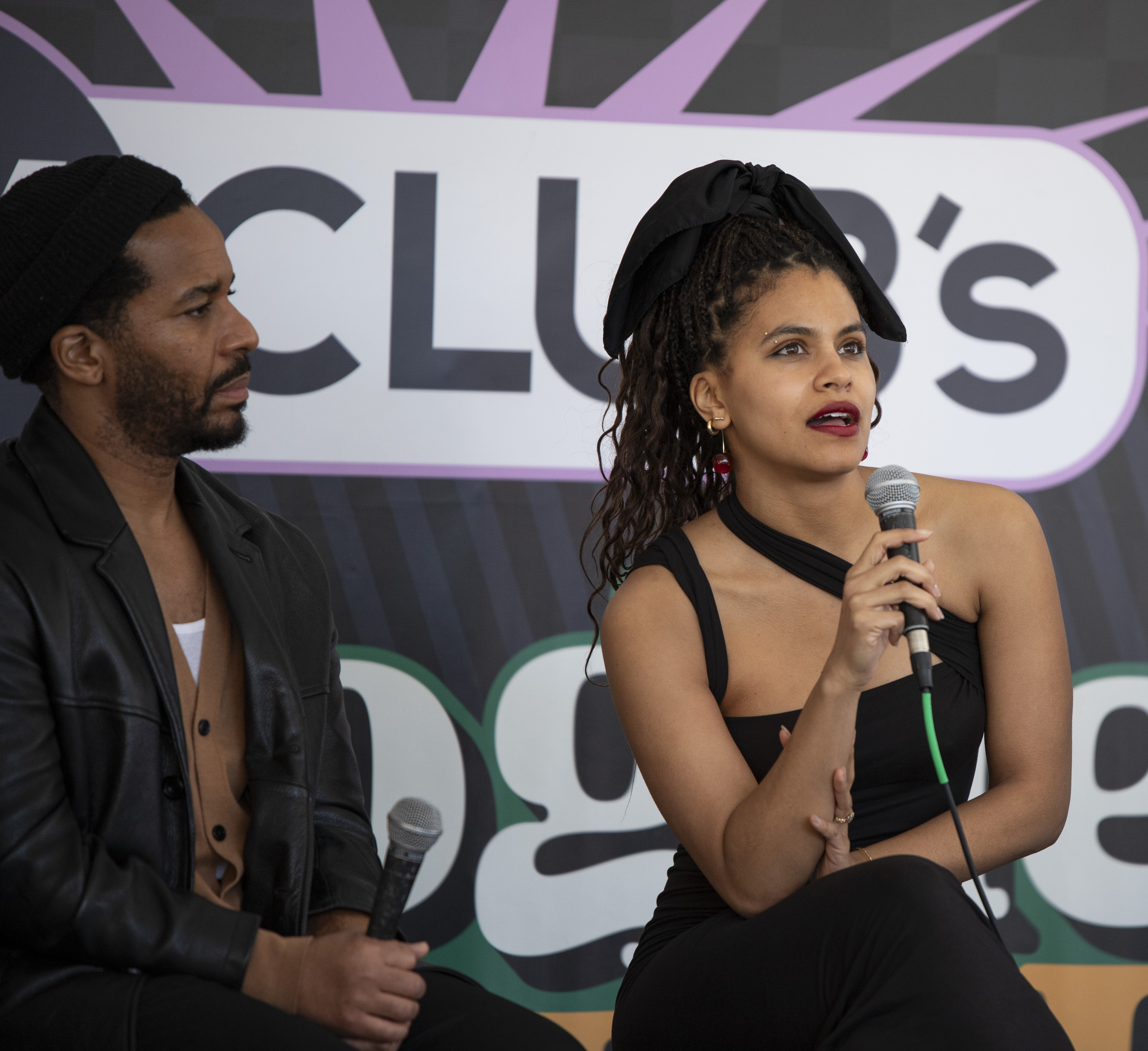
Holland (left) and Zazie Beetz (right) promoting The Dutchman at South by Southwest 2025

Following the success of Moonlight, in 2017, Holland portrayed Youngblood in August Wilson's play Jitney on Broadway. He next appeared in DuVernay's fantasy adventure film A Wrinkle in Time, released in March 2018. The film received mixed reviews from critics. Later that year, he portrayed the leading character Henry Matthew Deaver on the Hulu series Castle Rock; his turn on the series has earned positive reviews from critics, including Amy Woolsey of Vulture, who praised his performance as "textured."

Since July 2018, he has starred in a production of Othello at Shakespeare's Globe, costarring with Mark Rylance. In 2018, he also made his Off Off Broadway directing debut with a production of Greg Keller's Dutch Masters.

Holland starred as the lead role in Duke Johnson's 2025 film The Actor, based on the novel Memory by Donald E. Westlake.

== Filmography ==
=== Film ===
Year	Title	Role	Notes
2008	Sugar	Brad Johnson	Nominated – Gotham Independent Film Award for Best Ensemble Performance
2008	Miracle at St. Anna	Private Needles	
2008	Last Call	Pete	
2009	Bride Wars	DJ Jazzles	
2009	Us: A Love Story	Carjack Victim	Short film
2011	Small, Beautifully Moving Parts	Leon	
2012	Nobody's Nobody's	Jason	Short film
2013	42	Wendell Smith	
2014	Black or White	Reggie Davis	
2014	Selma	Andrew Young	Nominated – Broadcast Film Critics Association Award for Best Cast; Nominated – NAACP Image Award for Outstanding Supporting Actor in a Motion Picture; Nominated – San Diego Film Critics Society Award for Best Cast; Nominated – Washington D.C. Area Film Critics Association Award for Best Ensemble
2016	Moonlight	Kevin Jones	Boston Online Film Critics Association Award for Best Ensemble; Boston Society of Film Critics Award for Best Ensemble; Critics' Choice Movie Award for Best Acting Ensemble; Gotham Independent Film Award for Best Ensemble Performance; Independent Spirit Robert Altman Award; New York Film Critics Online Award for Best Ensemble Cast; Nominated – Black Reel Award for Best Supporting Actor; Nominated – Detroit Film Critics Society Award for Best Ensemble; Nominated – Florida Film Critics Circle Award for Best Supporting Actor; Runner-up – Florida Film Critics Circle Award for Best Cast; Nominated – Phoenix Film Critics Society Award for Best Ensemble Acting; Nominated – San Diego Film Critics Society Award for Best Performance by an Ensemble; Nominated – Screen Actors Guild Award for Outstanding Performance by a Cast in a Motion Picture; Nominated – Washington D.C. Area Film Critics Association Award for Best Ensemble
2018	A Wrinkle in Time	Principal James Jenkins	
2019	High Flying Bird	Ray Burke	
2019	Battle at Big Rock	Dennis	Short film
2021	Passing	Brian Redfield	
2022	Bones and All	Frank Yearly	
2024	Exhibiting Forgiveness	Tarrell	
2024	Shirley	Walter Fauntroy	
2025	Love, Brooklyn	Roger	Also producer
2025	The Dutchman	Clay	
2025	The Actor	Paul Cole	
2026	The Revisionist		
2026	They Fight	Walt Manigan	
2028	Miami Vice '85 †		Filming
TBA	Lincoln in the Bardo †		In production
TBA	The Thing That Hurts †		Post-production

=== Television ===
Year	Title	Role	Notes
2006	Law & Order	David Sachs	Episode: "Public Service Homicide"
2007	The Black Donnellys	Frank Thomas	Episode: "Wasn't That Enough?"
2007	The News	DeShawn Burkett	Television film
2009	Lost & Found	Gayle Dixon	Television film
2010	The Rockford Files	Angel Martin	Television film
2010	Damages	Bank Manager	Episode: "You Haven't Replaced Me"
2011	Friends with Benefits	Julian "Fitz" Fitzgerald	13 episodes
2011	Burn Notice	Dion Carver	Episode: "Breaking Point"
2012–2013	1600 Penn	Marshall Malloy	13 episodes
2014–2015	The Knick	Dr. Algernon Edwards	20 episodes Satellite Award for Best Cast – Television Series; Nominated – Critics' Choice Television Award for Best Supporting Actor in a Drama Series; Nominated – Satellite Award for Best Supporting Actor – Series, Miniseries or Television Film
2016	American Horror Story: Roanoke	Matt Miller	9 episodes
2018	Castle Rock	Henry Deaver	10 episodes
2020	The Eddy	Elliot Udo	8 episodes
2024	The Big Cigar	Huey P. Newton	Miniseries
2024	Terminator Zero	Malcolm Lee	Voice

== Awards and nominations ==
Awards	Year	Category	Work	Result	Ref.
Black Reel Awards	2015	Outstanding Breakthrough Performance	Selma	Nominated	
Black Reel Awards	2017	Outstanding Supporting Actor	Moonlight	Nominated	
Black Reel Awards	2020	Outstanding Actor, TV Movie/Limited Series	The Eddy	Nominated	
Black Reel Awards	2025	Outstanding Lead Performance	Exhibiting Forgiveness	Nominated	
Black Reel Awards	2025	Outstanding Lead Performance in a TV Movie/Limited Series	The Big Cigar	Nominated	
Black Reel Awards	2026	Outstanding Lead Performance	Love, Brooklyn	Nominated	
Critics' Choice Awards	2015	Best Acting Ensemble	Selma	Nominated	
Critics' Choice Awards	2016	Best Acting Ensemble	Moonlight	Won	
Critics' Choice Television Awards	2015	Best Supporting Actor in a Drama Series	The Knick	Nominated	
Drama League Award	2026	Distinguished Performance	The Brothers Size	Nominated	
Detroit Film Critics Society	2016	Best Ensemble	Moonlight	Won	
Florida Film Critics Circle	2016	Best Supporting Actor	Moonlight	Nominated	
Georgia Film Critics Association	2017	Best Ensemble	Moonlight	Won	
Gotham Independent Film Award	2009	Best Ensemble Performance	Sugar	Nominated	
Gotham Independent Film Award	2016	Special Jury Award – Ensemble Performance	Moonlight	Won	
Gotham Independent Film Award	2019	Best Actor	High Flying Bird	Nominated	
Independent Spirit Awards	2017	Robert Altman Award	Moonlight	Won	
NAACP Image Awards	2015	Outstanding Supporting Actor in a Motion Picture	Selma	Nominated	
NAACP Image Awards	2026	Outstanding Actor in a Motion Picture	Exhibiting Forgiveness	Nominated	
NAACP Image Awards	2026	Outstanding Actor in a Motion Picture	Love, Brooklyn	Nominated	
New York Film Critics Online	2016	Best Ensemble Cast	Moonlight	Won	
Outer Critics Circle Awards	2026	Outstanding Lead Performer in an Off-Broadway Play	The Brother's Size	Nominated	
San Diego Film Critics Society	2014	Best Ensemble	Selma	Nominated	
San Diego Film Critics Society	2016	Best Ensemble	Moonlight	Nominated	
Satellite Awards	2015	Best Supporting Actor in a Series, Miniseries or TV Film	The Knick	Nominated	
Satellite Awards	2015	Best Ensemble	The Knick	Won	
Screen Actors Guild Awards	2017	Outstanding Performance by a Cast in a Motion Picture	Moonlight	Nominated	
Seattle Film Critics Society	2017	Best Ensemble Cast	Moonlight	Won	
Washington D.C. Area Film Critics Association	2014	Best Ensemble	Selma	Nominated	
Washington D.C. Area Film Critics Association	2016	Best Ensemble	Moonlight	Nominated	
