= Philip Klein (composer) =

American film and television composer

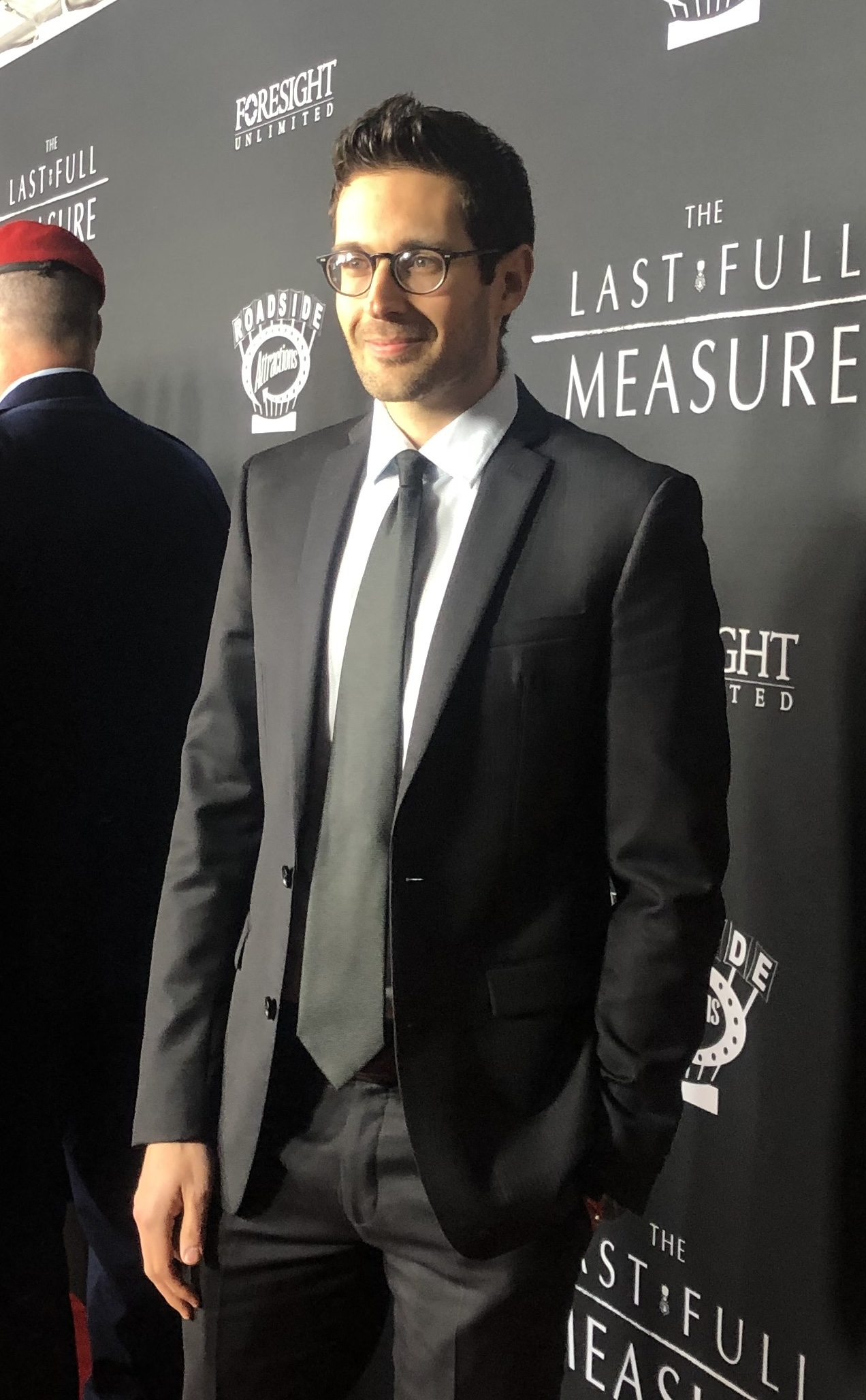
- Born: Batavia, New York, U.S.
- Occupations: Composer, conductor, orchestrator
- Years active: 2005–present

Philip Klein is an American film and television composer and orchestrator. He is best known for scoring Wish Dragon, Pig, and The Last Full Measure.

== Life and career ==
Klein was born in Batavia, New York, and studied trumpet and composition at Northwestern University. In 2011, he was selected to be a Fellow at the Sundance Institute Composers Lab. He has collaborated with composers including Harry Gregson-Williams, Carter Burwell, James Newton Howard, Ludwig Göransson, Fil Eisler, and Alex Heffes.

== Selected filmography ==
As composer

Year	Title	Director	Notes
2022	Medieval	Petr Jákl	—N/a
2021	Wish Dragon	Chris Appelhans	—N/a
2021	Pig	Michael Sarnoski	Co-composed with Alexis Grapsas
2019	The Last Full Measure	Todd Robinson	—N/a
2015	Growing Up and Other Lies	Darren Grodsky and Danny Jacobs	Co-composed with Fil Eisler
2026	The Revisionist	Alex Vlack	

As orchestrator

- 2022 – Fantastic Beasts: The Secrets of Dumbledore
- 2022 – Turning Red
- 2021 – Jungle Cruise
- 2021 – Raya and the Last Dragon
- 2020 – News of the World
- 2019 – The Mandalorian
- 2019 – Joker
- 2018 – Fantastic Beasts: The Crimes of Grindelwald
- 2016 – Fantastic Beasts and Where to Find Them
- 2016 – The Finest Hours

== Awards and nominations ==
Year	Result	Award	Category	Work	Ref.
2022	Nominated	International Film Music Critics Association	Best Original Score for an Animated Film	Wish Dragon	
2021	Nominated	International Film Music Critics Association	Breakthrough Film Composer of the Year	The Last Full Measure	
2009	Won	ATAS Foundation College Television Awards	Best Composing	Hangar No. 5	
