= Jackie Robinson Foundation =

American non-profit organization

- Abbreviation: JRF
- Formation: 1973
- Type: 501(c)(3) organization
- Headquarters: New York, NY, United States
- President and CEO: Della Britton Baeza
- Key people: Gregg A. Gonsalves; Rachel Robinson; Sharon Robinson
- Revenue: $8,789,626 (2015)
- Expenses: $8,257,064 (2015)
- Website: www.jackierobinson.org

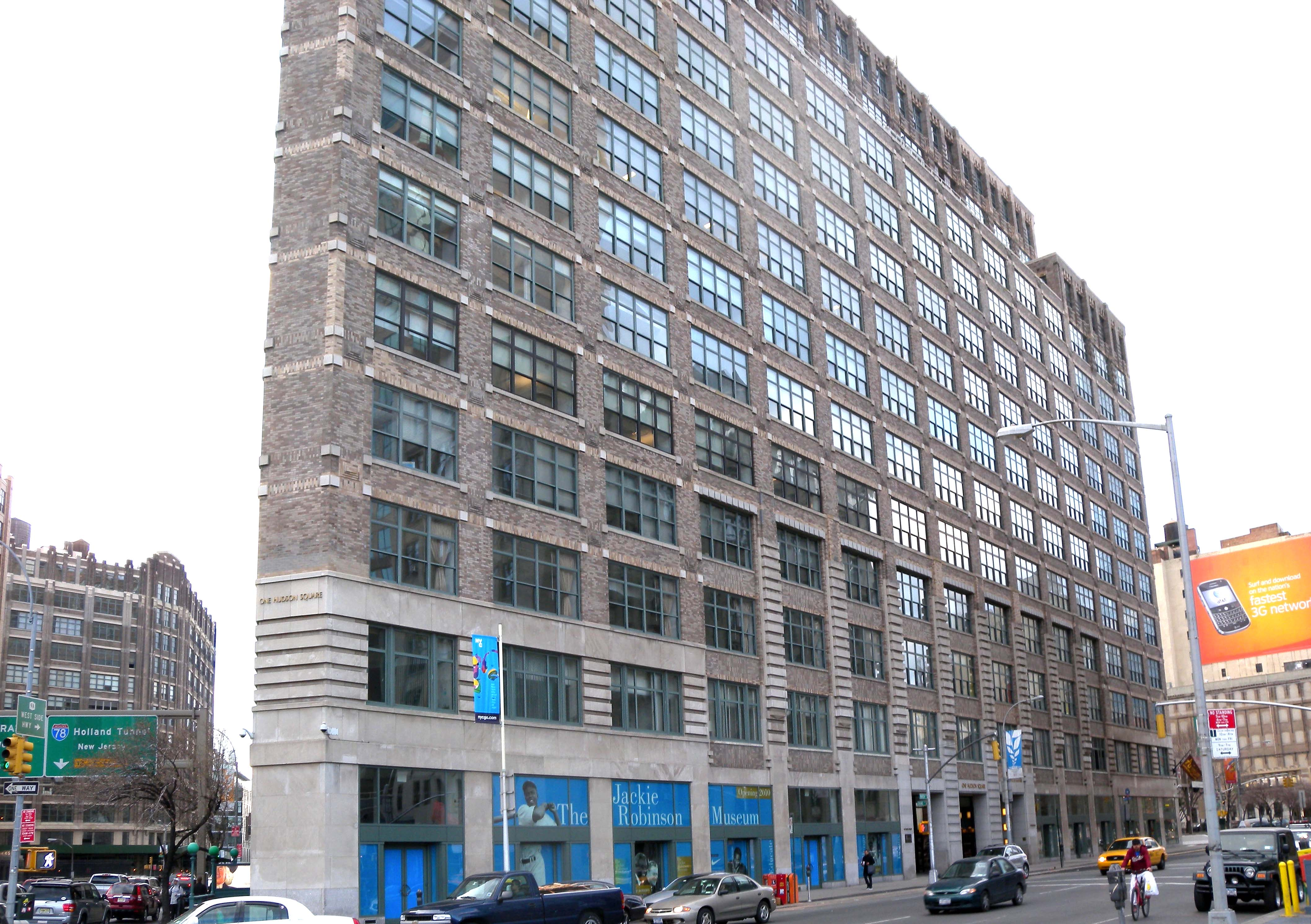
Headquarters of the Jackie Robinson Foundation and home of the Jackie Robinson Museum

The Jackie Robinson Foundation is a national, 501(c)(3) non-profit organization, which gives scholarships to minority youths for higher education, as well as preserves the legacy of Baseball Hall of Fame member Jackie Robinson. The foundation was founded by Rachel Robinson, the wife of Jackie, in 1973, a couple of months after his death. The foundation provides four-year college scholarships in conjunction with a comprehensive set of skills and opportunities to disadvantaged students of color to ensure their success in college and to develop their leadership potential. Its hands-on, four-year program includes peer and professional mentoring, internship placement, extensive leadership training, international travel and community service options, the conveyance of practical life skills, and myriad networking opportunities. The foundation's strategic combination of financial assistance and support services results in a nearly 100% college graduation rate. Since its founding, over 1,450 scholars have received scholarships. Support for the foundation comes from various sponsors. Among its supporters are Major League Baseball, the Los Angeles Dodgers, General Electric, Goldman Sachs, and Nike, Inc.

== Jackie Robinson Museum ==
On April 27, 2017, the Jackie Robinson Foundation held a groundbreaking ceremony for the Jackie Robinson Museum, located at 75 Varick Street, in lower Manhattan, New York City, US. The foundation opened the 18,500-square-foot (1,720 m^{2}) museum on September 5, 2022 (Labor Day).

== ROBIE Award ==
The foundation presents the ROBIE award, a tribute to an individual who has promoted and expanded opportunities for minorities in the corporate world. The 2016 awardees were Pittsburgh Steelers chairman Dan Rooney, founder of Bobbi Brown Cosmetics Bobbi Brown, and Vista Equity Partners chairman and chief executive officer Robert F. Smith. Previous honorees have included Mariano Rivera, Bruce Ratner, Thomas Tull, Henry Louis Gates, Tyler Perry, Paul Tagliabue, Sean Combs, Rita Moreno, Robert Redford, George Lucas, Robin Roberts, John D. Finnegan, Joe J. Plumeri, Hillary Clinton, John Thain, Michael Jordan, Ella Fitzgerald, Arthur Ashe, Pete Rozelle, Clive Davis, Magic Johnson, Dick Gregory, and Desmond Tutu.

== Funding ==
In December 2025, the foundation received $20 million, the largest donation it has ever received, from Thomas Tull, co-chairman of TWG Global, and Mark Walter, co-chairman of TWG Global and owner of the Los Angeles Dodgers.
