= Wish Dragon (soundtrack) =

Wish Dragon (Original Motion Picture Soundtrack)

Film score by Philip Klein
- Released: June 11, 2021
- Recorded: 2020–2021
- Genre: Film score
- Length: 69:01
- Label: Milan
- Producer: Philip Klein

Philip Klein chronology
The Last Full Measure (2020)	Wish Dragon (2021)	Pig (2021)

Wish Dragon (Original Motion Picture Soundtrack) is the soundtrack album to the 2021 animated family comedy film Wish Dragon directed by Chris Appelhans. The musical score is composed by Philip Klein which was released through Milan Records on June 11, 2021.

== Development ==
Philip Klein composed the film score for Wish Dragon. He shared a good friendship with Aron Warner, one of the film's producers, who recommended his name to Appelhans. Klein submitted few demos to Appelhans which he liked, and the latter arranged a meeting with both Klein and Warner, discussing the musical ideas and possibilities. The producer and director eventually approved Klein's involvement. He further admitted that Appelhans' "passion for storytelling, the characters and the culture is what drew me in early on". Klein sent several other Chinese instrument sounds, folk songs, vocal demos and operatic percussions, "basically any sound we could find" and eventually zeroed on the overall palette and approach they thought that would work and experiment with those bound. Klein said that "Chris [Appelhans] had such a strong vision of what he wanted and needed out of the score" admitting that he has been also involved with the musical process from start to end.

Despite their initial discussion on using Chinese instruments, the team never leaned on crafting a completely Chinese score. Hence, Klein set out to create a layered score with a global influence, which he did in a unique way rather than putting soloists on top of the Western orchestra. Dwelling deep into Chinese folk songs and traditional instruments, Klein noted that it made them certain emotions, and he played some of it on his own and hired soloists all over the world to record these sounds, which he further manipulated and used it as textures. For Din's theme, much of his music is based on plucked instruments as rhythmic score, while the romantic and grandeur elements had him utilize wind and string instruments. Klein noted that "when [Eastern influences are] brought on to an Asian score, some Western composers choose to use the pentatonic scale" using five notes, but Appelhans and Klein felt it to be inappropriate. Klein noted on the ruan (Note: a Chinese moon guitar) and guqin (Note: a Chinese stringed musical instrument) played together felt like a natural duet, which was often used in folk music. Hence, Klein took influences from the orchestration and mood of the Chinese folk songs. Klein liked the use of choir, which resulted in the use of Asian shouting and traditional choir towards the grand emotional moments. Most of the material were based on Chinese operatic percussions, which was pre-recorded with traditional Chinese percussive instruments like gongs and large drums, which were used in action sequences and "gave this momentum that just the orchestra couldn't do on their own." The use of pipa also served as the character in the film, referencing Pipa God (Ronny Chieng), a character which guards the family to the spirit world. Klein licensed the performance of a pipa player (Note: The name of the player was not revealed by the film crew) who played a famous pipa piece in Chinese repertoire and took video of it for animators to note it down, to animate the first sequence of the film.

For Din and Li Na's relationship, they balanced a thematic identity and the sonic world with more synthetic textures, while the synth elements were used for the modern world of Shanghai. Long's themes were curated with the help of orchestra for grandeur and traditional Chinese instruments, to bring an old-world sound. The antagonists', who were modern and "cutting-edge", had few heavy bass and synthesizers, along with processed Chinese elements using darker bows to make it a bit traditional. He noted the dichotomy between the modern story, where the bad guys chase the girl and boy who were falling in love, and the grand traditional story of the Chinese fable with the three wishes to be exciting and as a balance between old and new and vice versa. Appelhans was concerned on having an emotional core to the story, regarding to Din and his family and discussed about having thematic moments for the emotional sequences.

The score was recorded much prior to the COVID-19 pandemic lockdown where Klein orchestrated and conducted the score with the New Zealand Symphony Orchestra along with his norm collaborator Weijun Chen, who helped him in the use of Chinese instruments.

== Release ==
The soundtrack was released through Milan Records on June 11, 2021, the same day as the film's release.

== Reception ==
Jonathan Broxton of Movie Music UK wrote "Despite having just two above-the-title scores to his name, Philip Klein is already well on his way to fully establishing himself as one of film music’s most exciting and talented newcomers. He is also clearly positioning himself as their heir apparent of composers like James Newton Howard, Alan Silvestri, and those other master practitioners of full and lush orchestral scores. Wish Dragon is a superb work, beautifully orchestrated, deftly structured, and emotionally strong." Ben of Soundtrack Universe wrote "Even with the aforementioned problem of sounding like other composers, Klein continues to show great promise as a budding film composer with Wish Dragon thankfully allowing his own musical voice to shine through moreso than his feature debut. Fans of the animated works of the previously mentioned composer influences should find plenty to enjoy here while those largely turned off by animation should still give the closing "A Tale As Old As Time" suites a chance. If his first two solo film efforts are any indication, Philip Klein has a bright composing future ahead of him."

Peter Debruge of Variety and Natalia Winkelman of The New York Times found the score to be "engaging" and "exciting". Sandy Schaefer of Comic Book Resources wrote "Philip Klein's score gives traditional Chinese instruments like the Pipa and Ruan a synthesized makeover, further underscoring the movie's approach to honoring China's past while exploring the ways its culture has evolved in the present-day."

== Track listing ==
No.	Title	Length
1.	"Endless Sky" (Kenton Chen, Katherine Ho & Weilim Lin)	2:32
2.	"Free Smiles" (Tia Ray & Far East Movement)	2:29
3.	"Prologue"	2:47
4.	"Li Na Says Goodbye"	2:30
5.	"I Gotta Go"	1:07
6.	"The Goons"	1:13
7.	"All Dressed Up"	1:58
8.	"The Tea Is Ready"	1:44
9.	"Finders Keepers"	2:45
10.	"City Walk"	2:33
11.	"Aerial Acrobatics"	2:02
12.	"Din and Li Na"	1:57
13.	"Long Admits"	2:24
14.	"Din and Mom Argue"	1:02
15.	"Shanghai Showdown"	2:57
16.	"That Same Old Shikumen"	3:01
17.	"Certain Expectations"	4:55
18.	"The Wish Dragon"	2:42
19.	"Teapot Battle"	5:46
20.	"True Sacrifice"	1:47
21.	"My Last Wish"	1:45
22.	"Everything That Matters / The End"	4:33
23.	"A Tale as Old as Time" (Suite I)	5:53
24.	"A Tale as Old as Time" (Suite II)	4:10
25.	"Din's Piano"	2:29
Total length:		69:01

== Accolades ==
Award	Category	Recipient	Result	Ref.
International Film Music Critics Association	Best Original Score for an Animated Film	Philip Klein	Nominated	
