= Media about Bruce Lee =

Media about Hong Kong-American celebrity

Martial artist and actor Bruce Lee has been subject to extensive media coverage.

== Media portrayals ==
Films and television series that cover the life of Bruce Lee include:

- Bruce Lee: The Man, The Myth (1976), a largely fictional biopic starring a Lee lookalike, Ho Chung Tao, billed under the name Bruce Li.
- Spirit of the Dragon (1992), a Cantonese drama series produced by ATV Home based loosely on Lee's life. The series starred Chinese American actor David Wu as Bruce Lee.
- Dragon: The Bruce Lee Story (1993), a biopic in which Lee was portrayed by Jason Scott Lee.
- The Legend of Bruce Lee, a Chinese 50-episode series that aired on CCTV, beginning in October 2008; it was intended to promote Chinese culture alongside the 2008 Beijing Summer Olympics. The series starred Hong Kong actor Danny Chan as Lee. It has been watched by over 400 million viewers in China, making it the most-watched Chinese television drama series of all time.
- Bruce Lee, My Brother (2010), a biopic directed by Raymond Yip and Manfred Wong, and co-produced by Bruce Lee's younger brother Robert Lee Jun-fai. Aarif Lee starred as Bruce Lee, with Tony Leung Ka Fai, Michelle Ye, MC Jin and Christy Chung also appearing. The film was released to the general audience on November 25, 2010, soon before what would have been Bruce Lee's 70th birthday.
- Ip Man 3 (2015), a film loosely based on Bruce Lee's mentor Ip Man, features Danny Chan Kwok-kwan again portraying Lee after previously starring as Lee in the 2008 television series The Legend of Bruce Lee. Chan played Lee again in Ip Man 4: The Finale (2019).
- Quentin Tarantino's 2019 film Once Upon a Time in Hollywood is set during the late 1960s when actress Sharon Tate worked with Bruce Lee during the making of the 1968 film The Wrecking Crew, for which Lee was the fight choreographer. Lee is portrayed by Mike Moh.
- In 2022, Ang Lee announced a Bruce Lee bio film for Sony Pictures with his son Mason as Lee.

Various other filmmakers have previously announced plans to make films about Lee, including Fruit Chan and Terence Chang, Stanley Kwan, and Stephen Rivele and Christopher Wilkinson.

== Books about Bruce Lee, Jeet Kune Do or both ==
- Bruce Lee: The Man Only I Knew – written by his widow Linda Lee Cadwell. This book served as the basis for the film about his life, Dragon: The Bruce Lee Story.
- Bruce Lee: Words of the Dragon: Interviews 1958-1973 – written by John Little.
- Bruce Lee: The Art of Expressing the Human Body – also written by John Little.
- The Dragon and the Tiger: The Birth of Bruce Lee's Jeet Kune Do, the Oakland Years, by Sid Campbell.
- Bruce Lee Between Wing Chun and JKD – written by Jesse Glover.
- Bruce Lee: Dynamic Becoming – a book about Bruce Lee's philosophy.
- Bruce Lee: Fighting Spirit – a biography by Bruce Thomas.
- Striking Thoughts – thoughts and quotes of Bruce Lee.
- The Tao of Jeet Kune Do – a book assembled posthumously that expresses Bruce Lee's notes on martial arts and philosophy.
- "On the Warrior's Path" by Daniele Bolelli (2003). The longest chapter of this book about martial arts philosophy is on Bruce Lee's philosophical legacy.
- Unsettled Matters: The Life & Death of Bruce Lee, Tom Bleecker (former husband of Lee widow Linda Lee Cadwell), 1996, Gilderoy Publications, ISBN 0-9653132-0-4.
- Be Water, My Friend: The Early Years of Bruce Lee – a picture book for children, written by Ken Mochizuki and illustrated by Dom Lee, featuring an account of Bruce Lee's childhood and early manhood, which the author says is basically factual.
- King Dragon: The World of Bruce Lee – written by Norman Borine.

== Bruce Lee documentaries ==
- Be Water (2020)
- Bruce Lee Lives (2011)
- How Bruce Lee Changed the World (2009)
- The Intercepting Fist (2001)
- The Unbeatable Bruce Lee (2001)
- Bruce Lee: A Warrior's Journey (2000)
- Bruce Lee: The Path of the Dragon (1998)
- The Immortal Dragon (1996)
- Bruce Lee: The Curse of the Dragon (1993)
- Death by Misadventure (1993)
- Martial Arts Master (1993)
- Bruce Lee, the Legend (1977)
- Bruce Lee: The Man and the Legend aka Life and Legend of Bruce Lee (1973)

== Video games ==
- Bruce Lee, a video game published by Datasoft Inc under license in 1984.
- Dragon: The Bruce Lee Story, a video game published by Acclaim Entertainment in 1993.
- In Super Mario RPG, when Mario is about to fight a boss, his comrade Mallow stops him and says "Who do you think you are, Bruce Lee. You can't go in there with your fists flying". This was removed in the 2023 remake.
- Bruce Lee: Quest of the Dragon, a video game published by Universal Interactive in 2002.
- Bruce Lee: Return of the Legend, a Game Boy Advance video game published by Universal Interactive in 2002.

== Comic books ==
- Marvel Comics published, in the black and white magazine line under their Curtis Magazines imprint, a 35-page comic story-style biography of Bruce Lee in Deadly Hands of Kung Fu #28, September 1976. It was written by Martin Sands, with art by Joe Staton and Tony DeZuniga.
- Malibu Comics published a 6-issue comic book miniseries, Bruce Lee, in 1995, although the story was a purely fictional adventure and the titular character had little in common with the real-life Bruce Lee. It was written by Mike Baron (who had previously written three comic stories for NOW Comics' range of Green Hornet comic books about the version of Kato played by Lee on the 1966 television series) and drawn by Val Mayerik (who had drawn the second Kato miniseries).

== Characters based on Bruce Lee ==
- Be Like Water, a play by Dan Kwong, produced at East West Players in 2008, features the character Ghost of Bruce Lee.
- Liu Kang from Mortal Kombat is based on Bruce Lee.
- Fei Long, from the Street Fighter video game series, is based on Bruce Lee. Li Long and Maxi from the Soul series and Long from Xuan Dou Zhi Wang as well.
- Marshall Law and Forest Law, from the Tekken video games, are based on Bruce Lee.
- Kim Dragon, from the World Heroes video game series, is also based on Bruce Lee.
- Jann Lee, a Jeet Kun Do adherent from the video game series Dead or Alive is based heavily on Bruce Lee, adopting his battle cries, wardrobe choices, and fighting style. A cut scene shows Jann Lee watching what appears to be a Bruce Lee film as a boy.
- Rock Lee from Naruto is based on Bruce Lee.
- Abyo, from the animated series Pucca, is also based on Bruce Lee.
- Hitmonlee from the original Pokémon series is an allusion to Bruce Lee whose fighting style primarily used kicks.
- Li Shang from Mulan is based on Bruce Lee.
- Kenshiro from Fist of the North Star displays most of Bruce Lee's fighting mannerisms and weapon choices. Fist of the North Star illustrator Tetsuo Hara has said in an interview that Bruce Lee, along with Japanese actor Yūsaku Matsuda, served as template for Kenshiro's design.
- Lee Pai-Long from Shaman King is greatly modeled after Bruce Lee. He not only resembles Bruce Lee in appearance, but also shares many of his historical attributes as well as references, such as the film adaptation of Fists of Fury being placed in the Shaman King storyline in manga format.
- In the third season of the 2012 Teenage Mutant Ninja Turtles animated series, the character of Hun (originally a muscle-bound Caucasian from the 2003 cartoon series) makes his debut, with his appearance and behaviour closely patterned after Bruce Lee.
- Underground Arena kenpo fighter Blues Ebinuma (ブルース海老沼) from Yakuza 3 is modeled after Bruce Lee, wearing his famous yellow suit from Game of Death.

== See also ==
- Bruce Lee filmography
- Bruce Lee Library
- Bruce Lee (comics)
- Bruceploitation
- List of awards and honors received by Bruce Lee
- Jeet Kune Do
