= Bruce Lee (disambiguation) =

Bruce Lee (1940–1973) was a Chinese-American martial artist, actor, martial arts instructor, philosopher, filmmaker and founder of Jeet Kune Do.

Bruce Lee may also refer to:

== People ==
- Bruce George Peter Lee (born 1960), British arsonist and serial killer
- Bruce Y. Lee, computer modeler, professor, and physician
- Bruce Lee Rothschild, mathematics professor
- Mike Park, American musician a.k.a. Bruce Lee

== Books ==
- Bruce Lee (comics), 1995 Malibu Comics comic
- Bruce Lee: The Man Only I Knew, biography
- Bruce Lee Library, a set of non-fiction books

== Films ==
- Bruce Lee (2017 film), a Tamil action-comedy film
- Bruce Lee, an upcoming Malayalam-language action film directed by Vysakh
- Bruce Lee: A Dragon Story, fictionalized biopic
- Bruce Lee: A Warrior's Journey, documentary film
- Bruce Lee, My Brother, biopic
- Bruce Lee: The Curse of the Dragon, biopic
- Bruce Lee: The Lost Interview, interview film
- Bruce Lee: The Man, The Myth, dramatized biopic
- Bruce Lee: The Fighter, a Telugu film directed by Srinu Vytla
- Dragon: The Bruce Lee Story, biopic
- The Legend of Bruce Lee, biopic
- Bruce Lee and the Outlaw, a 2018 documentary directed by Joost Vandebrug

== Videogames ==
- Bruce Lee (video game), a 1984 platform fighter by Datasoft
- Bruce Lee: Return of the Legend, a 2003 video game for the Game Boy Advance
- Bruce Lee: Quest of the Dragon, a 2002 video game for the Xbox
- Bruce Lee Lives: The Fall of Hong Kong Palace, a 1989 PC computer game
- Dragon: The Bruce Lee Story, a 1993 video game

== Songs ==
- "Bruce Lee" (song), a song by Underworld
- "Bruce Lee", a 2016 song by Robbie Williams from The Heavy Entertainment Show

== Other ==
- The Bruce Lee Band, pop-punk band
- Bruce Lee statue in Hong Kong
- Mostar Bruce Lee statue

== See also ==
- Bruceploitation
- Bruce Lai, Hong Kong actor and part of Bruceploitation
- Bruce Le (呂小龍), Hong Kong actor and part of Bruceploitation
- Bruce Li (何宗道), Taiwanese actor and Bruce Lee impersonator in Bruceploitation
- Bruce-Li, the badminton team of Alexandra Bruce and Michelle Li
- Owen Bruce Slee, Australian radioastronomer
