= Tim Tackett =

American martial arts instructor (1941–2025)

- Born: Timothy Harlan Tackett; February 21, 1941; Los Angeles, California, U.S.
- Died: October 23, 2025 (aged 84)
- Occupation: Martial arts Instructor
- Children: Tim Tackett, Jr

Timothy Harlan Tackett (February 21, 1941 – October 23, 2025) was an American martial arts instructor and author from Redlands, California, who ran a non-profit group dedicated to preserving Bruce Lee's art of Jeet Kune Do.

== Life and career ==
Tackett began training in the martial arts when he was stationed in Taiwan in 1962 while serving in the United States Air Force. On the recommendation of a friend, he began studying martial arts intensively. During his 3 years in Taiwan he learned two types of xingyiquan, tai chi, Northern and Southern Shaolin, White Crane, and Monkey style kung fu. After his discharge from the Air Force in 1966, he opened a Gung Fu school in Redlands, California while attending the University of California, Riverside.

Tackett saw Bruce Lee demonstrate Jeet Kune Do in 1967 at Ed Parker's tournament in Long Beach, California. Busy with college and supporting a family he closed his Gung Fu school and focused on his education. Soon after receiving his Master of Fine Arts in 1970 he began a career as a high school drama teacher (he was retired) from Montclair High School then Etiwanda High School. Along with his first student Bob Chapman, he visited Dan Inosanto's backyard Jeet Kune Do school on the recommendation of Dan Lee. At that time the class consisted of about 10 students including Bob Bremer, Dan Lee, Richard Bustillo, Pete Jacobs and Jerry Poteet.

In 1973 he was given a senior instructor's rank by Dan Inosanto and was permitted to teach Jeet Kune Do to a small group of students. Having no desire to teach JKD publicly, he moved his most senior group of students to his garage in Redlands, California where he continued to hold classes every Wednesday night. Beginning around 1983, Tackett and Larry Hartsell taught Jeet Kune Do at Vic Payne’s Great Smokey Mountain Martial Arts Camp every summer of its existence and has taught courses throughout the United States and in Europe. He is also known for applying martial arts principles to football; he has worked with the Dallas Cowboys and San Francisco 49ers in this regard.

Tackett died in his sleep on October 23, 2025, at the age of 84.

== Publications ==
- "Chinatown Jeet Kune Do: Essential Elements of Bruce Lee's Martial Art" by Tim Tackett, Bob Bremer ISBN 0-89750-163-2
- "Jun Fan Jeet Kune Do: The Textbook" by Chris Kent, Tim Tackett ISBN 0-86568-131-7
- "Jeet Kune Do Kickboxing" by Chris Kent, Tim Tackett ISBN 0-86568-120-1
- "Jeet Kune Do" by Larry Hartsell, Tim Tackett ISBN 0-86568-051-5
- "Jeet Kune Do: Counterattack Grappling Counters and Reversals" by Larry Hartsell, Tim Tackett ISBN 0-86568-081-7
- "Hsing-i kung-fu" by Tim Tackett ISBN 0-89750-084-9
- "Hsing-i Kung-fu: Volume II, Combat" by Tim Tackett

== Sources ==
- Kelly, Perry (2000). Dan Inosanto: The Man, The Teacher, The Artist, Paladin Press. ISBN 1-58160-079-8.
- Kent, Chris., & Tackett, Tim. (1988). Jun fan, jeet kune do: the textbook. Los Angeles, CA: Know Now Pub. Co.
- Tackett, Tim. (1998). Jeet Kune Do Bruce Lee's Jeet Kune Do : the way of intercepting fist. Madrid, Spain: Budo International Pub. Co.
