= Jun Fan =

Jun Fan may refer to:

- Lee Jun-fan, better known as Bruce Lee
  - certain martial arts interpretations he created, taught, or inspired
    - Jun Fan Gung Fu (see Jeet Kune Do#Overview and philosophy)
    - Jun Fan Jeet Kune Do
    - The Original (or Jun Fan) JKD branch of Jeet Kune Do#Branches
