= Dragon: The Bruce Lee Story =

1993 film by Rob Cohen

- Theatrical release poster
- Directed by: Rob Cohen
- Screenplay by: Rob Cohen; John Raffo; Edward Khmara
- Based on: Bruce Lee: The Man Only I Knew by Linda Lee Cadwell; Bruce Lee: The Biography by Robert Clouse
- Produced by: Raffaella De Laurentiis; Rick Nathanson; Dan York
- Starring: Jason Scott Lee; Lauren Holly; Nancy Kwan; Robert Wagner
- Cinematography: David Eggby
- Edited by: Peter Amundson
- Music by: Randy Edelman
- Production company: Universal Pictures
- Distributed by: Universal Pictures
- Release date: May 7, 1993
- Running time: 120 minutes
- Country: United States
- Language: English
- Budget: $16 million
- Box office: $63.5 million

Dragon: The Bruce Lee Story is a 1993 American biographical drama film directed by Rob Cohen. The film stars Jason Scott Lee, with a supporting cast including Lauren Holly, Nancy Kwan, and Robert Wagner. The film follows the life of actor and martial artist Bruce Lee (Jason) from his relocation to the United States from Hong Kong to his career as a martial arts teacher, and then as a television and film actor. It also focuses on the relationship between Bruce and his wife Linda, and the racism to which Bruce was subjected.

The primary source of the screenplay is Cadwell's 1975 biography Bruce Lee: The Man Only I Knew. Other sources include Robert Clouse's book Bruce Lee: The Biography and research by Cohen, including interviews with Cadwell and Bruce's son, Brandon Lee. Rather than a traditional biographical film, Cohen decided to include elements of mysticism and to dramatise fight scenes to give it the same tone as the films in which Bruce starred. Dragon was filmed primarily in Hong Kong, Los Angeles and San Francisco.

Dragon: The Bruce Lee Story was released by Universal Pictures on May 7, 1993. The film received generally positive reviews, with critics finding it entertaining despite criticisms of its veneration of Bruce. Jason was widely praised for his performance. The film was a commercial success and its revenue exceeded box office averages for biographical films, which was attributed to its romantic themes and its appeal to people outside the traditional kung fu film audience. A video game adaptation of the same name was released the following year. Dragon is dedicated to Brandon, who died several weeks before its release.

== Plot ==
In Hong Kong, Bruce Lee's father Lee Hoi-chuen awakens from a nightmare about a phantom, known as the Demon, haunting his young son. He subsequently enrolls him in Chinese martial arts training with instructor Yip Man. As a young adult, Bruce fights British sailors who are harassing a young Chinese woman. As a result, he must flee Hong Kong. His father insists he go to the US.

In the US, Bruce works as a dishwasher at a Chinese restaurant until he gets in a brawl with four of the cooks. The restaurant owner Gussie Yang fires him but also lends him money and encourages him to go to college. While studying philosophy in college, Bruce begins to teach martial arts classes, where he meets Linda, a white American. Bruce marries Linda in defiance of her racist mother, Vivian. Linda suggests Bruce establish a martial arts school, but his Chinese peers demand he train only Chinese people. When Bruce refuses, they challenge him to settle the matter in combat. Bruce defeats a challenger named Johnny Sun in a secret, no-holds-barred match but Johnny attacks Bruce after he has admitted defeat, and Bruce sustains a debilitating back injury. While Bruce is temporarily paralyzed, Linda helps him write the martial arts book Tao of Jeet Kune Do. Linda gives birth to their first child, Brandon, and the couple reconcile with her mother.

Some months later, during a martial arts tournament run by Ed Parker, Johnny challenges Bruce to a rematch. Bruce defeats and humiliates Johnny, earning the respect of the audience. Bruce is unaware that Johnny becomes crippled from his injuries in the fight. After the match, Bill Krieger, who later becomes Bruce's manager, offers him the role of Kato in the television series The Green Hornet. Bruce and Krieger also create the idea for the television series Kung Fu, agreeing that Bruce will feature in the lead role. At a cast party, Linda says she is pregnant with their second child, Shannon. Shortly afterwards, the cancellation of The Green Hornet is announced. Kung Fu later makes it to television but much to Bruce's frustration, it stars the white actor David Carradine. Bruce believes Krieger has betrayed him.

Bruce returns to Hong Kong for his father's funeral. Philip Tan, a Hong Kong film producer, hires Bruce to star in the film The Big Boss. During the filming of the final scene, Johnny's brother Luke attacks Bruce in revenge for Johnny's humiliating defeat and subsequent disability; Bruce narrowly wins the fight. The Big Boss is a success and Bruce makes several more films, working as an actor, director, writer and editor. This causes a rift between Bruce and Linda, as Linda wishes to return to the US. Krieger offers Bruce a chance to work on a big-budget Hollywood film, to which Bruce agrees, partly because of Linda's wish to return home.

On the 32nd day of filming Enter the Dragon, during the "room of mirrors" sequence, Bruce has a terrifying vision of the Demon that has haunted his and his father's dreams. This time, after being beaten and then shown his own grave, Bruce sees his son urging Bruce to save him. The Demon pursues Brandon, spurring Bruce to fight back, save Brandon and break the Demon's neck with a pair of Nunchaku. Bruce later films another scene from Enter the Dragon, the film that would make him an international star. In a voice-over, Linda tells the audience Bruce fell into a mysterious coma and died shortly before the film's release and says while many people want to talk about how he died, she prefers to remember how he lived.

== Cast ==
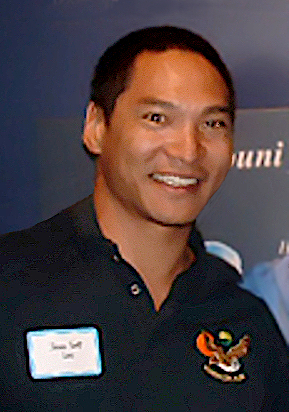
Jason Scott Lee (no relation), pictured in 2003, starred as Bruce.

- Jason Scott Lee as Bruce Lee
- Lauren Holly as Linda Lee
- Robert Wagner as Bill Krieger
- Michael Learned as Vivian Emery
- Nancy Kwan as Gussie Yang
- Lim Kay-tong as Philip Tan
- Ric Young as Bruce's father
- Luoyong Wang as Yip Man
- Sterling Macer as Jerome Sprout
- Sven-Ole Thorsen as the Demon
- John Cheung as Johnny Sun
- Ong Soo Han as Luke Sun
- Eric Bruskotter as Joe Henderson
- Forry Smith as Green Hornet
- Van Williams as The Green Hornet director
- Shannon Lee as Party Singer
- Rob Cohen as Enter the Dragon director
- Clyde Kusatsu as History Teacher

== Themes ==
Writing about pedagogy and political correctness in film, Meaghan Morris includes a six-page analysis of a scene in Dragon, where Bruce and Linda watch Breakfast at Tiffany's at a cinema; Linda suggests they leave when she notices Bruce is upset at Mickey Rooney's yellowface performance of I. Y. Yunioshi. Morris describes the scene as didactic, as it allows Linda, who was originally enjoying the film, to understand and share Bruce's revulsion of racist stereotypes. Noting the film's portrayal of Bruce's life as a "battle against Western prejudice", Morris concludes Dragon is "one of the more powerful treatments of institutionalized racism in a film industry that US cinema possesses".

Writing in the Asian Journal of Communication in 2013, academic Zheng Zhu listed Dragon alongside Kiss of the Dragon (2001) and The Tuxedo (2002) as films that broke from the Western tradition of portraying Asian men as asexual, stating that while they are often featured as heroes in martial arts films, they are rarely portrayed as romantic or loving. Noting the films each show an Asian martial artist with a white female partner, Zhu states they reverse the conventional portrayal of a "dominant white knight and a submissive Oriental lady". However, he makes critiques of the portrayal of these relationships. For example, each film shows "white women play[ing] the most important role" in helping Chinese men accomplish success, as evidenced by Linda's support for Bruce while he recovers from his back injury. Asian men, Zhu argues, are portrayed as incapable of achieving success in Western society unless they are supported by white femininity.

== Production ==
=== Pre-production ===
A major source for the film's screenplay, which was written by director Rob Cohen in cooperation with Edward Khmara and John Raffo, was Linda Lee Cadwell's biography Bruce Lee: The Man Only I Knew. Other sources included Robert Clouse's book Bruce Lee: The Biography, and original research by Khmara and Cohen. Cadwell provided resources for the film's production. Scenes showing hand-written notes and drawings from Bruce's book Tao of Jeet Kune Do are his original works. She also provided access to Bruce's clothing so replicas could be created for the film.

Cohen stated his first problem when writing the screenplay was to condense Bruce's life into under two hours of film. He decided to avoid making a standard biographical film and instead incorporate "mystical and legendary aspects" to dramatise Bruce's life, telling his story "as if it were, in fact, a Bruce Lee movie". Cohen learnt that for the first two years of Bruce's life, his parents had dressed and passed him off as a girl to protect him from a superstitious Chinese belief that demons target first-born sons. Influenced by this tale, Cohen decided to show Bruce being pursued by a supernatural demon, seeing it as a metaphor for an inner demon that may have motivated and influenced Bruce. When Cohen first met Cadwell after giving her the screenplay, she asked how Cohen had learnt about Bruce's demon. Cohen said he had dramatised the plot element after studying his life; Cadwell said Bruce told her he felt as though a demon was trying to drag him away when he collapsed 10 weeks before his death. Cohen spent hours talking to both Cadwell and Brandon in preparation for the film.

=== Casting ===
"[Brandon Lee] said I wouldn't survive in this part if I treated his father like a god. He said his father was, after all, a man who had a profound destiny, but he was not a god. He was a man who had a temper, a lot of anger, who found mediocrity offensive. Sometimes he was rather merciless."

— Jason Scott Lee

Actors were still being considered for the role of Bruce in April 1991, including Brandon Lee. While Brandon was the right age and had appropriate martial arts training to portray his father, and was perceived by some as a likely choice for the role, producer Raffaella De Laurentiis said he did not look Chinese enough and that she would have refused to work on the project if they had to resort to making Brandon appear more Asian. Brandon independently turned down the role, finding it too strange to play his father, especially when it came to the romantic life of his parents. Jason Scott Lee, who had auditioned for a role in The Last of the Mohicans but was rejected because he did not appear Native American, was recommended for the role of Bruce early in pre-production. The Last of the Mohicans's casting director was impressed with him and recommended him to Cohen. Jason said at first he felt intimidated by his role portraying Bruce but he overcame his fear after speaking to Brandon. Jason was a gymnast and athlete, but had no martial arts training. Cohen cast Jason because he believed trying to teach a martial artist to act would be more difficult than training an actor in martial arts. To prepare for their roles, Jason and Lauren Holly trained in Bruce's martial-arts style of Jeet Kune Do for months under Bruce's former student Jerry Poteet. Poteet praised Jason's new martial arts abilities, as did John Cheung, the actor who portrayed Johnny Sun and served as the film's fight and stunt coordinator. Cheung worked as a stuntman on Enter the Dragon. Cohen chose him because he believed it was important for the fight scenes to be choreographed in a Hong Kong style rather than a US one.

Cohen cast Nancy Kwan as Gussie Yang, a restaurant owner and Bruce's employer. Like Bruce, Kwan played a pivotal role in the acceptance of actors of Asian ancestry in major Hollywood film roles and Cohen wanted audiences to be reminded of her achievement and the struggle of Asian American actors. He cast Michael Learned as Vivian Emery because he loved her portrayal of Olivia in The Waltons and wished to see Bruce's confrontation with the person recognisable as that character. Emery gave filmmakers permission to portray her as initially hostile and racist towards Bruce; Emery said she had treated him that way when they first met.

Van Williams, who played The Green Hornet in the 1960s TV series of the same name, was given a cameo appearance as the director of The Green Hornet. Bruce's daughter, Shannon, has a cameo as a singer in the party scene, at which Linda tells Bruce she is pregnant with Shannon. Sven-Ole Thorsen was cast as the Demon due to his height and physique. Cohen states he did a "remarkable job" during the fight scenes considering he was unable to see out of the costume's headpiece. Cohen gave himself a cameo as the director of Enter the Dragon.

=== Filming ===
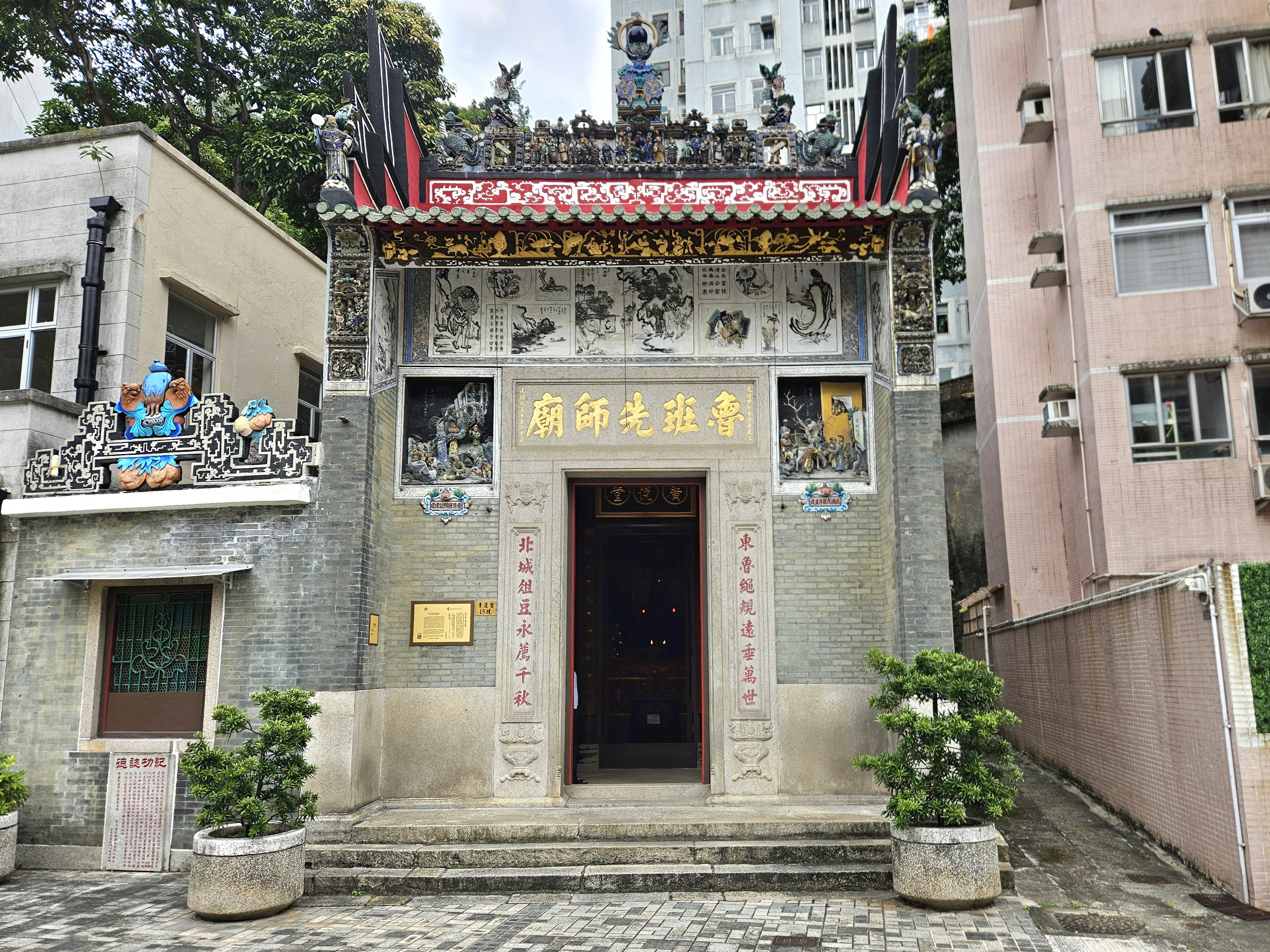
Lo Pan Temple was used for the film's opening scene. The ceramic figures at the top drew Cohen's attention when he was scouting locations.

Dragon: The Bruce Lee Story was filmed primarily in Hong Kong, Los Angeles and San Francisco. The opening scene was filmed at an 18th-century temple in Hong Kong, which Cohen found while scouting locations. Cohen, who wanted the audience to understand from the beginning that the film would not be a traditional biography, incorporated the theme of a demon chasing Bruce. Cohen wanted to film in Seattle but found little cooperation from local authorities and was denied permission to film at the University of Washington, which Bruce had attended. It was subsequently decided to merge the events of Bruce's life that occurred in Seattle with those that occurred later when he moved to California, where much of the filming took place.

Filming was delayed multiple times; Cohen had a heart attack on 6 February 1992, delaying production for a month; another delay was caused when Jason became ill. Filming was also affected by a monsoon during which Hong Kong experienced its heaviest rainfall in decades, as well as an extortion attempt by a triad, who threatened Cohen and other individuals because the crew were working on the gang's territory. Cohen sped up production so the cast and crew could vacate the area earlier than planned. The setbacks used up the entirety of the film's $1.3 million contingency budget.

The fight between Bruce and the chefs is set in San Francisco but was filmed on a set in Hong Kong, and some of the scenes that take place in Hong Kong were filmed in California. The outdoor scene in which Bruce teaches martial arts to a football team was filmed at a college in Los Angeles using exact replicas of the columns at the University of Washington, where Bruce used to teach. The crowd scenes during the premiere of The Big Boss were shot in Macao, China, because the crew could not obtain permission to close roads and film scenes involving hundreds of extras in Hong Kong, where the scene is set.

More than 1,600 shots were taken for the film, of which a thousand were for the eight fight scenes. Cohen inserted several references to Bruce's films; the extended warm-up routine by Bruce and Johnny before their fight is a reference to the one performed by Bruce and Chuck Norris before their fight in The Way of the Dragon.

=== Post-production ===
Dragon: The Bruce Lee Story's original budget had been about $14 million. Despite exhausting the contingency budget, Universal agreed to spend a further $1 million on fight-scene sound effects and the soundtrack after viewing the film's rough cut, bringing the final cost to $16 million. None of the custom-made sound effects in the fight scenes were used twice.

Cohen decided to expand the theme of Bruce's father's belief that a demon was stalking his son, by showing the Demon chasing Brandon. Filming was completed and Dragon was less than two months away from opening when Brandon died in a shooting accident while filming The Crow in March 1993. Cohen stated the scene is one of the "eeriest moments" in the film for him; after Brandon's death it "gave [him] great pause to think and still haunts [him]". Following Brandon's death, Cohen asked Cadwell whether she wanted to postpone the release or modify the film; she declined and asked for it to be dedicated to his memory with an appropriate quotation. With Cadwell's approval, Cohen chose a quotation by Saint Augustine he originally had on the front of the script: "The key to immortality is first living a life worth remembering", which he felt applied to both Bruce and Brandon.

Marketing for Dragon: The Bruce Lee Story focused on the romance between Bruce and Cadwell; advertising campaigns targeted soft-rock radio stations. Universal chairman Tom Pollock said they were trying to appeal to women and to move beyond Bruce's core audience. The marketing campaign was not modified following Brandon's death.

=== Soundtrack ===
The soundtrack for Dragon: The Bruce Lee Story was composed by Randy Edelman, who used a 90-piece orchestra and traditional Chinese instruments. Cohen praised the soundtrack for acting as a kind of "emotional through line" for his film. Ray Apello from Entertainment Weekly lauded its romantic tracks, though Jason Ankeny from AllMusic gave the soundtrack two stars out of five, saying the "oddly patriotic, even stereotypically Americanized score" is too generic for the subject matter, adding "per usual, Edelman operates in broad, simple strokes, crafting saccharine melodies that are pure function and no form." Edelman's soundtrack has been licensed for use in trailers for several other films.

== Release ==
=== Critical response ===
The film received positive reception, with reviewers typically finding it entertaining despite criticisms of its veneration of Bruce. Peter Rainer from the Los Angeles Times described the depiction as "hero-worshiping", though he gave a favorable review, saying, "you can forgive the way the film concocts and inflates incidents in Lee's life, because ... that's the way it is with larger-than-life actors: They prime you for larger-than-life stories." Roger Ebert said the martial arts sequences defy "gravity and logic ... but what the heck: It's fun to watch," and Vincent Canby described it as "an enjoyably hokey, big-budget theatrical film with a lot of kicks and the soul of a television movie". Richard Harrington of The Washington Post praised the film's ability to appeal to more people than just fans of Bruce and martial arts, saying it also explored issues such as love, interracial romance, marriage and parenthood. Sheila Johnston from The Independent, however, argued the attempt to cater to multiple audiences with numerous themes convoluted the film. Audiences polled by CinemaScore gave the film an average grade of "A" on an A+ to F scale.

Jason's performance as Bruce was widely praised. Both Donald Chase and Lawrence Christon of the Los Angeles Times commended him; Chase said he seemed to be Bruce's reincarnation and Christon said Jason "brings intelligence and charm to the role". According to Rainer, the exciting aspect of Dragon: The Bruce Lee Story is that with Jason, it was creating a new star from the story of an old one. Cadwell also praised the performance, saying "I almost feel it was worth waiting all this time for Jason to grow old enough to play Bruce." Jason received a nomination for "Most Promising Actor" at the 1993 Chicago Film Critics Association Awards for his roles in both Dragon and Map of the Human Heart, and a nomination for "Best Breakthrough Performance" for Dragon at the 1994 MTV Movie Awards.

On the review aggregator website Rotten Tomatoes, 75% of 24 critics' reviews are positive, with an average rating of 6.8/10. The website's consensus reads: "While its impact is blunted by an overly reverential approach to its subject, Dragon: The Bruce Lee Story remains a reasonably entertaining biopic of the martial arts legend." Metacritic, which uses a weighted average, assigned the film a score of 69 out of 100, based on 27 critics, indicating "generally favorable" reviews.

=== Initial screening and box office ===
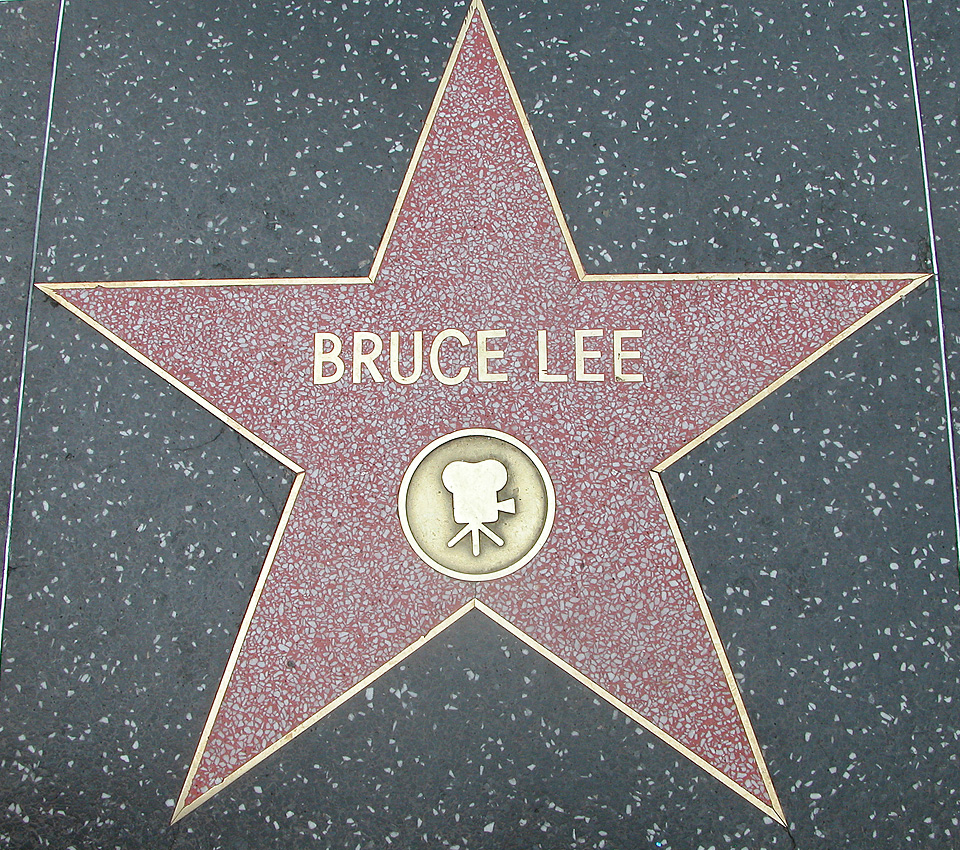
Bruce's star on the Hollywood Walk of Fame was dedicated on the day Dragon: The Bruce Lee Story premiered.

Dragon: The Bruce Lee Story premiered in Hollywood at Grauman's Chinese Theatre on 28 April 1993; Bruce's star on the Hollywood Walk of Fame was dedicated earlier that day. A postscreening after party was held in a nearby parking lot under a 15,000-square-foot (1,400 m^{2}) tent that was decorated with Chinese themes. More than 1,200 guests including Demi Moore, Wesley Snipes, Dolph Lundgren, Sheila E., Mike Myers, Cadwell and Shannon attended, together with the film's co-stars Lauren Holly, Robert Wagner, Nancy Kwan and Van Williams, and producer Raffaella De Laurentiis. Many viewers found the screening to be bittersweet, due to Brandon's recent death. Cadwell stated she attended because the film "is a tribute to our family's life and for that reason I thought I should be here. I feel the film is a tribute to Bruce as a father and to Brandon as a son."

The film opened to the public in the US on May 7, and debuted at number one, grossing just over $10 million in its opening weekend. The film's revenue outperformed expectations for a biography, which was largely attributed to the number of women who attended screenings; 45% of the film's audience for the opening weekend were women, whereas audiences for Bruce's actual films were overwhelmingly male. The success of the film and also the political satire Dave were credited with raising cinema audiences 65% from the same weekend period the previous year. David Fox from Los Angeles Times described the earnings as "impressive" for a debut in the historically slow period of early May. Dragon: The Bruce Lee Story had a gross of $35.1 million in the United States and Canada, and a gross of $28.4 million in other territories, making a total worldwide revenue of $63.5 million.

=== Related media ===
A video game of the same name was created by Virgin Interactive and first released on Sega Mega Drive in Europe in June 1994; it was later released in other continents and ported to other platforms. It is a fighting game in which players assume the role of Bruce and fight his opponents in the film, including one of the English sailors and the chefs; the final boss is the Demon. The game omits some of the film's plot elements, such as the romance between Bruce and Cadwell. The game was met with mixed reviews. Electronic Gaming Monthly gave the Atari Jaguar version 4.4/10, calling it "more or less your run-of-the-mill action fighter game" and commenting it was released too long after the film to benefit from the license.

=== Home media ===
The film was released on VHS by MCA/Universal Home Video on December 14, 1993, on LaserDisc on December 15, 1993, and on DVD on July 1, 1998.

== Historical accuracy ==
In Dragon: The Bruce Lee Story, Bruce travels to the US in steerage; Cohen acknowledges this is inaccurate and was done to show the typical experiences of emigration by Chinese people. It also allowed him to introduce the character called the History Teacher, who illustrates the difficulties Chinese immigrants faced once they arrived. Extrapolations are made of events in Bruce's life before he met Cadwell. For example, Bruce had a reputation for street fighting and was also employed as a dishwasher, but there is no evidence he fought with a group of chefs while he was at work as shown in the film. Metaphors are used to represent real events. An example of this can be found when a cheering crowd carries Bruce away from Linda after the premiere of The Big Boss. Cohen said he used the scene to illustrate Bruce's fame creating a distance between the couple.

Some elements of Bruce's life were condensed to reduce the length of the story, such as all his managers being replaced with the fictional Bill Krieger. The order of events was also sometimes altered to suit the narrative. Tragedy is depicted by combining the death of Bruce's father, who had died years earlier, with the news that Bruce's idea for a television show was stolen and turned into Kung Fu, which was not released until a year after its depiction in the film. The allegation that Bruce's idea was stolen was first raised in Cadwell's biography Bruce Lee: The Man Only I Knew, though it is contested. In his only television interview, which occurred in December 1971 on The Pierre Berton Show, Bruce talks of his plans for a TV series called The Warrior, which has the same premise as Kung Fu, though he expresses doubt the series will go ahead as casting a non-white actor in a lead role is considered a business risk by television executives. Bruce did audition for the lead role in Kung Fu. According to Bruce Lee biographer Matthew E. Polly, he was overlooked due to his accent and also his personality not matching the character, though Warner Bros. insist that Kung Fu was a separate project from The Warrior, an assertion that is supported by Polly.

Bruce's assertion that the Chinese martial-arts community confronted him about teaching martial arts to non-Chinese people, and subsequently challenged him to a fight as depicted in the film, is debated. Bruce's opponent in the film, Johnny, is fictional, as is his brother Luke. Bruce's real-life opponent Wong Jack-man contests Bruce's version of events, saying the challenge note he issued to him had nothing to do with his teaching of non-Chinese people. Martial artist Leo Fong, who was Bruce's friend, also said the fight was not about who he was teaching, rather it "really had to do with Bruce's personality". Bruce had publicly denounced other styles of martial arts and had previously accepted and won a challenge fight issued by a karate practitioner who had taken offense at his comments. While supporting Bruce's version of events, Cohen said he dramatised the fight's location and formal setting, as well as Johnny attacking Bruce from behind after losing. Bruce actually injured his back weightlifting, though according to Cohen, depicting Bruce injuring himself in this way would not have been a "great movie moment". While Ed Parker invited Bruce to speak at the 1964 Long Beach International Karate Championships, Bruce was not challenged to a fight there as depicted in the film. The attack of Bruce on the set of The Big Boss is also fictional, as is his ability to break a 200-pound (91 kg) block of ice with his fist during the fight. While wishing to depict an accurate account of Bruce's struggles, accomplishments and personality, Cohen stated he wanted to create fights that had the "humor and spectacle" of one of Bruce's actual films, where there was a "larger sense of fun [and] danger" though "reality is not exactly adhered to".

== Bibliography ==
- Cohen, Rob (1993). Director's Commentary (Dragon: The Bruce Lee Story, DVD). Universal Pictures.
