= Chinese Gung Fu: The Philosophical Art of Self-Defense =

1963 book by Bruce Lee

- Author: Bruce Lee
- Language: English
- Genre: Martial arts, philosophy
- Publication date: 1963
- Publication place: United States

Chinese Gung Fu: The Philosophical Art of Self-Defense is a book written by Bruce Lee expressing his martial arts philosophy and viewpoints. It describes his early style of gung fu which was based heavily on Wing Chun. This was before the development of his unique style of martial arts called Jeet Kune Do in the late 1960s.

Chinese Gung Fu: The Philosophical Art of Self-Defense was published in early 1963 by Bruce Lee with the help of friend and fellow martial artist James Yimm Lee of Oakland, California. James had previously published books on the martial arts such as Modern Gung Fu, Karate: Iron, Poison Hand Training and Karate Oriental Self-Defense in 1957. In the book Remembering the Master: Bruce Lee, James Yimm Lee and the Creation of Jeet Kune Do by Sid Campbell and Greglon Yimm Lee (James Lee's son) it is stated the initial run was 1,500 copies. The book was sold through James Lee's company Oriental Book Sales at a price of $5. In addition to the book, a companion Chinese Gung Fu instruction chart was available for $1.

Following Bruce Lee's death, his estate commissioned writer John Little to edit and publish some of Lee's writings. Little included the content of Chinese Gung Fu: The Philosophical Art of Self-Defense as well as additional 1964 writings by Bruce Lee in the book Bruce Lee, The Tao of Gung Fu: Commentaries on the Chinese Martial Arts.

== See also ==
- Bruce Lee Library
- Bruce Lee's Fighting Method
- Tao of Jeet Kune Do
- Jeet Kune Do
