= Bibliography of Bruce Lee =

Books written by or about Bruce Lee

The bibliography of Bruce Lee is composed of books written by or about Bruce Lee (1940–1973), famous Hong Kong and American martial artist, philosopher, author, instructor of martial arts, actor, filmmaker and screenwriter.

== Books authored ==
- Chinese Gung Fu: The Philosophical Art of Self-Defense (Bruce Lee's first book) – 1963

Read 1963 book online

- Tao of Jeet Kune Do (published posthumously) – 1973

Read 1973 book online

- Bruce Lee's Fighting Method (published posthumously) – 1978

Read 1978 book online

== Bruce Lee Library series ==
Cover of Jeet Kune Do — Vol. 3

The editor commissioned by Bruce Lee's estate for this series was John Little.

- Vol. 1: Words of the Dragon — Interviews, 1958–1973
- Vol. 2: The Tao of Gung Fu — A Study in the Way of Chinese Martial Arts
- Vol. 3: Jeet Kune Do — Bruce Lee's Commentaries on the Martial Way
- Vol. 4: The Art of Expressing the Human Body
- Vol. 5: Letters of the Dragon — Correspondence, 1958–73
- Vol. 6: Artist of Life
- Vol. 7: Striking Thoughts — Bruce Lee's Wisdom for Daily Living
- Vol. 8: The Celebrated Life of the Golden Dragon

Tuttle Publishing is the official publisher of this series.

== Biographies ==
- Bruce Lee: A Life, by Matthew Polly
- The Life and Tragic Death of Bruce Lee, by Linda Lee Cadwell (published in the United States as Bruce Lee: The Man Only I Knew)
- The Warrior Within, by John Little
- Beyond Bruce Lee, by Paul Bowman
- Striking Distance, by Charles Russo

== Other books about Bruce Lee ==
- Assli, Salem (2002). Jeet Kune Do 'Toutes les techniques de Bruce Lee'. Editions Chiron. ISBN 2-7027-0693-2.
- Balicki, Ron; Steve Gold (2001). Jeet Kune Do: The Principles of a Complete Fighter. HNL Publishing. ISBN 0-9531766-3-0.
- Baker, Tim (2019). The Bruce Lee Way: Motivation, Wisdom and Life-Lessons from the Legend. Media Lab Books. ISBN 978-1948174282.
- Beasley, Jerry (2001). The Jeet Kune Do Experience: Understanding Bruce Lee's Ultimate Martial Art. Paladin Press. ISBN 978-1-58160-131-2.
- Bishop, James (2004). Bruce Lee: Dynamic Becoming. Dallas: Promethean Press. ISBN 0-9734054-0-6.
- Bolelli, Daniele (2008). On the Warrior's Path. Blue Snake Books. ISBN 978-1-58394-219-2.
- Bowman, Paul (2013). Beyond Bruce Lee: Chasing the Dragon Through Film, Philosophy and Popular Culture. Wallflower Press. p. 1. ISBN 978-0-231-16529-7.
- Campbell, Sid (2003). The Dragon and the Tiger: The Birth of Bruce Lee's Jeet Kune Do. Vol. 1 (illustrated ed.). Frog Books. ISBN 1-58394-089-8.
- Campbell, Sid (2006). Remembering the master (illustrated ed.). Blue Snake Books. ISBN 1-58394-148-7.
- Cheng, David (2004). Jeet Kune Do Basics. Tuttle Publishing. ISBN 0-8048-3542-X
- Cardillo, Joseph (2003). Be Like Water: Practical Wisdom from the Martial Arts. Warner Books (NY). ISBN 978-0446690317.
- Clements, Jonathan (2017). A Brief History of the Martial Arts: East Asian Fighting Styles, from Kung Fu to Ninjutsu. London: Little, Brown Book Group. ISBN 9781472136466.
- Clouse, Robert (1988). Bruce Lee: The Biography (illustrated ed.). Unique Publications. ISBN 0-86568-133-3.
- Davis, Lamar (2001). Jun Fan/Jeet Kune Do: Scientific Streetfighting. HNL Publishing. ISBN 978-0-9531766-1-8.
- Dennis, Felix (1974). Bruce Lee, King of Kung-Fu (illustrated ed.). Wildwood House. ISBN 0-7045-0121-X.
- Dorgan, Michael (1980). Bruce Lee's Toughest Fight. EBM Kung Fu Academy.
- Fojón, Fernandez; Ivan E. (2017). Bruceploitation. Los clones de Bruce Lee. Applehead Team Creaciones. ISBN 9788494626463.
- Gigliotti, Jim; Who HQ. (2014). Who Was Bruce Lee? New York: Penguin Putnam Inc. Illustrated by John Hinderliter. ISBN 9780448479491.
- Glover, Jesse R. (1976). Bruce Lee Between Win Chun and Jeet Kune Do. Unspecified vendor. ISBN 0-9602328-0-X.
- Gong, Tommy. (2014). Bruce Lee: The Evolution Of A Martial Artist. Black Belt Communications. ISBN 9780897502085.
- Hochheim, Hoch (1995). The Maze of Jeet Kune Do, volume 33, issue 1. Rainbow Publications, Inc.
- Home, Stewart (2018). Re-Enter The Dragon: Genre Theory, Brucesploitation & the Sleazy Joys of Lowbrow Cinema. Melbourne: Ledatape Organisation. ISBN 978-0994411273.
- Kenny, Simon. (2009). Bruce Lee. Harpenden, Herts: Oldcastle Books Ltd. ISBN 9781842432877.
- Kent, Chris (1989). Jun Fan Jeet Kune Do: The Textbook. Action Pursuit Group. ISBN 0-86568-131-7.
- Kerridge, Steve (2021). Unseen Bruce Lee — The Reg Smith Connection. On the Fly Productions Ltd. ISBN 9781916223738.
- Kerridge, Steve (2022). Bruce Lee: The Intercepting Fist. On the Fly Productions Ltd. ISBN 9781916223714.
- Lee, Bruce (1975). Tao of Jeet Kune Do (reprint ed.). Ohara Publications. ISBN 0-89750-048-2.
- Lee, Bruce (1987). Chinese Gung Fu: The Philosophical Art Of Self-Defense. Paperback; Valencia, California, U.S.A.: Black Belt Communications. ISBN 9780897501125. ISBN 0897501128.
- Lee, Bruce (2008). M. Uyehara (ed.). Bruce Lee's Fighting Method: The Complete Edition (illustrated ed.). Black Belt Communications. ISBN 978-0-89750-170-5.
- Lee, Bruce (2009). Bruce Lee ― Wisdom for the Way. Black Belt Communications. ISBN 9780897501859.
- Lee, Linda (1975a). Bruce Lee: The Man Only I Knew. Warner Paperback Library. ISBN 0-446-78774-4.
- Lee, Linda (1989). The Bruce Lee Story. United States: Ohara Publications. ISBN 0-89750-121-7.
- Lee, Shannon (2020). Be Water, My Friend: The True Teachings of Bruce Lee. London: Ebury Publishing. ISBN 9781846046667.
- Little, John (1996). The Warrior Within — The philosophies of Bruce Lee to better understand the world around you and achieve a rewarding life (illustrated ed.). McGraw-Hill. ISBN 0-8092-3194-8.
- Little, John (1997). Bruce Lee: Letters of the Dragon: Correspondence, 1958-73. Charles E. Tuttle Co., Inc. p. 1. ISBN 0-8048-3111-4.
- Little, John (1997). Words of the Dragon: Interviews 1958–1973 (Bruce Lee). Tuttle Publishing. ISBN 0-8048-3133-5.
- Little, John (1997). Jeet Kune Do: Bruce Lee's Commentaries on the Martial Way (illustrated ed.). Tuttle Publishing. ISBN 0-8048-3132-7.
- Little, John (1997). The Tao of Gung Fu: A Study in The Way of Chinese Martial Art. Bruce Lee Library. Vol. 2 (illustrated ed.). Tuttle Publishing. ISBN 0-8048-3110-6.
- Little, John (1998). Bruce Lee: The Art of Expressing the Human Body. Tuttle Publishing. ISBN 978-0-8048-3129-1.
- Little, John (2000). Bruce Lee: The Celebrated Life of the Golden Dragon. Charles E. Tuttle Co., Inc. p. 1. ISBN 0-8048-3230-7.
- Little, John (2001). Bruce Lee: Artist of Life. Tuttle Publishing. ISBN 0-8048-3263-3.
- Little, John (2002). Striking Thoughts: Bruce Lee's Wisdom for Daily Living (illustrated ed.). Tuttle Publishing. ISBN 0-8048-3471-7.
- Maeda, Daryl Joji (2022). Like Water: A Cultural History of Bruce Lee. NYU Press. ISBN 978-1479812868.
- Mochizuki, Ken (2006). Be Water, My Friend: The Early Years of Bruce Lee. Illustrated by Dom Lee. Author's Note. New York: Lee & Low Books. ISBN 1-58430-265-8.
- Polly, Matthew (2018). Bruce Lee: A Life. New York: Simon & Schuster. ISBN 9781501187643.
- Rafiq, Fiaz; Lee Inosanto, Diana (2020). Bruce Lee: The Life of a Legend. Birlinn. ISBN 9781788853309.
- Russo, Charles (2016). Striking Distance: Bruce Lee and the Dawn of Martial Arts in America. University of Nebraska Press. p. 1. ISBN 978-0-8032-6960-6.
- Seaman, Kevin (1999). Jun Fan Gung Fu Seeking The Path of Jeet Kune Do. Health 'N' Life. ISBN 0-9531766-2-2.
- Sharif, Sulaiman (2009). 50 Martial Arts Myths. New media entertainment Ltd. ISBN 978-0-9677546-2-8.
- Tackett, Tim; Bremer, Bob. (2008). Chinatown Jeet Kune Do: Essential Elements of Bruce Lee's Martial Art. Santa Clarita, CA: Black Belt Communications. ISBN 9780897501637.
- Thomas, Bruce (1994). Bruce Lee: Fighting Spirit: a Biography. Berkeley, California: Frog, Ltd. ISBN 1-883319-25-0.
- Thomas, Bruce (2006). Immortal Combat: Portrait of a True Warrior (illustrated ed.). Blue Snake Books. ISBN 1-58394-173-8.
- Uyehara, Mitoshi (1993). Bruce Lee: the incomparable fighter (illustrated ed.). Black Belt Communications. ISBN 0-89750-120-9.
- Vaughn, Jack (1986). The Legendary Bruce Lee. Black Belt Communications. ISBN 0-89750-106-3.
- Vegara, Maria Isabel. (2019). Bruce Lee: Volume 29. Little People, Big Dreams (series of books). Illustrated by Miguel Bustos. London: Frances Lincoln Publishers Ltd. ISBN 9781786033352.
- Yılmaz, Yüksel (2000). Dövüş Sanatlarının Temel İlkeleri. İstanbul, Turkey: Beyaz Yayınları. ISBN 975-8261-87-8.
- Yılmaz, Yüksel (2008). Jeet Kune Do'nun Felsefesi. İstanbul, Turkey: Yalın Yayıncılık. ISBN 978-9944-313-67-4.

== See also ==
- Bruce Lee (comics)
- Bruce Lee filmography
- Jeet Kune Do
- List of awards and honors received by Bruce Lee
- Bruceploitation
