= Bruce Lee's Fighting Method =

1966 book by Bruce Lee

Cover of Bruce Lee's Fighting Method - The Complete Edition book with dust jacket ISBN 0-89750-170-5

Bruce Lee's Fighting Method is a book of volumes covering Bruce Lee's martial arts abilities of the Jeet Kune Do movement. The book is available as a single hardcover volume or a series of four paperback volumes. The text describes Bruce Lee's Kung Fu fighting techniques, philosophy and training methods. This book was originally written in 1966 by Bruce Lee. However, Lee decided not to publish this work as he feared that instructors would use the fighting knowledge in this text to promote themselves. In 1978, after Bruce Lee's death, his widow Linda Lee Cadwell decided to make available the information on her husband's work. Lee's death changed the perspective of releasing the information that Bruce Lee himself had vacillated about. The book was published with the help of Mitoshi Uyehara. Uyehara was the founder and owner of Black Belt Magazine. During the early years of the publication, Uyehara served as the publisher. Bruce Lee contributed many articles to the publication during the 1960s and a friendship ensued between the two men. Uyehara, a martial artist in his own right, was a key personage in arranging Lee's material for publication.

== Hardcover edition ==
The hardcover version of this text features in volumes in a different order:

- Part I - Basic Training
  - Ch. 1 - The Fighting Man Exercise
  - Ch. 2 - The On-Guard Position
  - Ch. 3 - Footwork
  - Ch. 4 - Power Training
  - Ch. 5 - Speed Training
- Part II - Skill In Techniques
  - Ch. 6 - Skill In Movement
  - Ch. 7 - Skill In Hand Techniques
  - Ch. 8 - Skill In Kicking
  - Ch. 9 - Parrying
  - Ch. 10 - Targets
  - Ch. 11 - Sparring
- Part III - Advanced Techniques
  - Ch. 12 - Hand Techniques for Offense (Part A)
  - Ch. 13 - Hand Techniques for Offense (Part B)
  - Ch. 14 - Attacks With Kicks
  - Ch. 15 - Defense and Counter
  - Ch. 16 - Attributes and Tactics
- Part IV - Self-Defense Techniques
  - Ch. 17 - Defense Against Surprise Attack
  - Ch. 18 - Defense Against An Unarmed Assailant
  - Ch. 19 - Defense Against Grabbing
  - Ch. 20 - Defense Against Choke Holds and Hugs
  - Ch. 21 - Self-Defense Against An Armed Assailant
  - Ch. 22 - Defense Against Multiple Assailants
  - Ch. 23 - Defense Against A Vulnerable Position

Read the book online

== New hardcover edition ==
In 2008 Black Belt magazine released an update to this book which was unavailable in hardcover form since 1981. The new version contains a new introduction by Bruce Lee's daughter, Shannon Lee. It also contains a new chapter entitled Five Ways of Attack by Mr. Ted Wong. Mr. Wong is a first generation martial arts student of Bruce Lee. Mr. Wong is also in many of the illustrated pictures within the text along with Bruce Lee depicting various Jeet Kune Do principles and techniques.

== Volumes 1–4 ==
- Vol 1. Self-Defense Techniques - This volume is illustrated with photos of Bruce Lee providing fighting techniques to survive attacks on the street. Defenses against surprise attacks, armed and unarmed assailants, single and multiple attackers, and techniques to be used when in a vulnerable position, are among the topics covered.

Read online: Vol. 1

- Vol 2. Basic Training - This volume is illustrated with photos of Bruce Lee, covers the fighting man's exercise system, the on-guard position, footwork, power training, speed training including the nontelegraphic punch and training in awareness.

Read online: Vol. 2

- Vol 3. Skill in Techniques - This volume, instructs the student on how to refine and polish their self-defense techniques as well as make use of the well conditioned body. Lee teaches how to develop skills in body movement, hand techniques, kicking, parrying, striking vital target points and sparring. Lee also compares the classical methods of hand combat techniques and parrying with the methods of jeet kune do and clarifies the differences.

Read online: Vol. 3

- Vol 4. Advanced Techniques - This volume is intended primarily for the student who has already availed themselves of the first three volumes. Bruce Lee presents the advanced techniques of his fighting method. Also with photos of Bruce Lee, the chapters include: Hand Techniques for Offense, Attacks With Kicks, Defense and Counter, and Attributes and Tactics, which includes a comparison of the mechanical versus the intelligent fighter.

Read online: Vol. 4

== See also ==
- Bruce Lee Library
- Chinese Gung Fu: The Philosophical Art of Self-Defense
- Tao of Jeet Kune Do
- Jeet Kune Do
