= Bruce Lee Lives =

1989 video game

Bruce Lee Lives: The Fall of Hong Kong Palace
- Developer: The Software Toolworks
- Publisher: The Software Toolworks
- Artist: Betsy Scafati
- Platform: MS-DOS
- Release: NA: 1989
- Genre: Fighting
- Mode: Single-player

Bruce Lee Lives: The Fall of Hong Kong Palace is a video game published in 1989 by The Software Toolworks for MS-DOS. It included a book titled Dragon's Tale: The Story of Bruce Lee, written by Bruce Lee's wife Linda.

== Plot ==
The game stars the Jeet Kune Do founder and movie actor Bruce Lee and the plot takes place at the Hong Kong Palace, a peaceful place where martial artists practice in order to become professional warriors; however, a large group of thugs led by a vile name Master Po came to start the destruction of Hong Kong Palace. This caused the citizens of Hong Kong Palace to cry for the help of the martial arts legend Bruce Lee to end the destruction of Hong Kong Palace by defeating Master Po and his henchmen to bring back peace to Hong Kong Palace. You play the part of Bruce Lee in a battle against Master Po and his gang.

== Gameplay ==
Screenshot

The object of the game is to beat the required number of opponents: from Bruce Lee's students to Master Po's servants. After defeating them, the final battle against Master Po awaits. Unlike most fighting games back then and nowadays, Bruce Lee Lives features a special AI engine that changes the difficulty level by focusing on the player's actions. If the player overuses one move in order to beat an opponent, the AI engine will reduce the player's chance at beating the next opponent with the same moves used so often against the previous opponent. This leads the player to a challenge of beating opponents if they were controlled by the designers of the game, causing the opponents to identify the easiest ways to knock out Bruce Lee.

== Development ==
The game uses a "learning" AI engine that can improve its strategy by examining and tracking a player's past actions.

== See also ==
- Dragon: The Bruce Lee Story (video game)
