= Spirit of the Dragon =

- Genre: Semi-autobiographical drama
- Country of origin: Hong Kong
- Original language: Cantonese
- No. of episodes: 30

Production
- Production location: Hong Kong
- Running time: 45 minutes per episode
- Production company: ATV

Original release
- Network: ATV
- Release: 27 July – 5 September 1992

Spirit of the Dragon (龍在江湖 李小龍傳奇) is a Hong Kong TV series based on famous martial artist Bruce Lee. The 30 episode series was released on ATV in 1992.

== Synopsis ==
The story begins with the young Bruce Lee (David Wu) as a martial artist trying to make it big. He tries his best to expand martial arts via his entertainment career, then later meets Linda (Gwennie Tam) and develop a relationship. Overall the story has been rated about 30% based on real facts, and the other 70% of created materials.

== Cast ==
Cast	Role
David Wu	Bruce Lee
Joey Meng	方霏
Esther Kwan	葉惠明
Lau Kar-leung	李百川
Gwennie Tam (譚筠怡)	Linda
Jackie Lui (呂頌賢)	石小虎
Nick Cheung	唐發
Eddy Ko	嚴星南
Mok Ka-yiu (莫家堯)	
Stephen Au	
Kwong Wa	

== See also ==
- Media about Bruce Lee
