= Bob Breen =

British martial artist

- Born: Robert Breen; 1949 (age 76–77)
- Nationality: British

Other information
- Occupation: Martial arts Instructor
- Website: http://www.bobbreen.com

Bob Breen is an author and professional martial artist who began martial arts training in 1966. He has trained under a significant number of senior martial arts experts and respected figures in the martial arts world. He has published 5 martial arts books.

== Career ==
Having begun martial arts training in 1966, after what he described as an early life involving frequent fights brought about by circumstances rather than intent, Bob began studying Wado Ryu under Tatsuo Suzuki (martial artist) in the early part of 1967. He earned his black belt in Wado Karate in 1970. He then went on to pass his second degree in 1972. Bob continued to study Karate and associated arts, and trained at Nihon University in Tokyo in 1974 under a number of Senior Masters, including Gōgen Yamaguchi. He competed for Great Britain in traditional Karate, captaining the Amateur Martial Arts Association (AMA) team who beat the Japanese in 1974, before discovering Jeet Kune Do and bringing it to Britain. Soon after, Bob began boxing and groundwork, and became one of the pioneers of full contact in Europe, both in terms of fighting and promoting. In 1978, he started Eskrima with Jay Dobrin. Since 1979, he has been studying Jeet Kune Do and Filipino Kali under master and worldwide respected figure Dan Inosanto, who himself trained under Bruce Lee, father of Jeet Kune Do. He is one of the foremost experts in knife-defense and close quarter combat, and was the team captain and a competitor at the 1989 World Stickfighting championships and Coach of the British Eskrima team that won 13 World Championship medals, including four gold medals in 1992.

He is qualified as a Full Instructor in JKD and Kali. Regarded as the father of JKD/ Kali and Filipino martial arts in the UK and Europe, he has released a range of self-defence books and DVDs, and online courses.

Bob Breen has also worked in training film actors in martial arts and fighting techniques, including working on spear and sword fighting with Michael Fassbender and other actors for the 2007 film 300. Bob has worked on numerous other films, including recently training Robert Pattinson in fighting techniques for the movie The Batman in 2022.

== Publications ==
- Fighting ISBN 1-905005-07-5
- Power Punching www.bobbreen.com/courses/power-punching
- Sparring ISBN 1-905005-37-7
