= David Wu (American actor) =

American actor (born 1966)

David Wu (Cantonese: Ng Dai-Wai, simplified Chinese: 吴大维; traditional Chinese: 吳大維; pinyin: Wú Dàwéi; born Southbridge, Massachusetts, 2 October 1966), also known by the nickname Wu-Man, is a Chinese American film actor, TV personality and formerly MTV Asia and Channel V video jockey.

== Early life and education ==
Wu grew up in Taiwan and attended an American international school, but attended middle and high school in America. He graduated from the University of Washington in Seattle.

== Career ==
Wu started his media career with an English teaching show Go West on Channel V in 1996. Initially, the show was to be an English classroom until Wu convinced the channel to turn the show into five-minute slots teaching slang.

== Personal life ==
Wu married his wife in May 2018 and has a daughter in January 2020.

== Filmography ==
=== Film ===
Year	Title	Role	Notes	Ref.
1985	The Young and Old Wanderers			
1986	Pom Pom Strikes Back	Doctor		
1987	The Game They Call Sex	Burglar		
1987	Kung Fu Kids IV			
1988	My Dream Is Yours	7-11 manager		
1988	Starry Is the Night	Cheung Tien-On		
1989	Perfect Match	David Shek		
1989	Lost Souls (1989 film)	Chao Te-Chu		
1990	Tiger Cage 2	David		
1990	Goodbye Hero	Jerome		
1990	A Tale from the East	Huang Zhin		
1990	Middle Man	David Ng		
1990	Return Engagement	David		
1991	Robotrix	Chou		
1991	The Banquet	Jogger		
1991	Lover at Large	Leung Ho		
1991	Sisters of the World Unite (1991 film)	Ray		
1992	Evil Black Magic	Wai		
1992	The Unleaded Love	Peter		
1992	Let Me Speak Up			
1993	Treasure Island	Polo		
1993	Cohabitation			
1993	Finale in Blood	Ma Kuang Shen		
1993	Farewell My Concubine	Red Guard		
1993	Young Wisely 1			
1994	One of the Lucky Ones			
1994	Let's Go Slam Dunk (男兒当入樽)	Ng Koon Nam		
1994	I Have a Date with Spring	Karl Sum		
1994	Young Wisely 2			
1995	Full Throttle	David Kwan		
1995	Passion Unbounded	Officer Shek Dai Hung / Daai Wai		
1996	Hu-Du-Men	Director Lam		
1996	Temptress Moon	Jing Yun		
1996	July 13th	Alan Kwok Ka Lun		
1998	Restless	Lead role playing Chinese-American visiting Beijing with grandfather's ashes		
2000	When I Fall in Love - with Both	Tung		
2000	Devils on the Doorstep	Major Gao		
2003	Hidden Track	Joe		
2004	Waiting Alone	One-Take Liu		
2008	Five Bullets			
2008	Ha! Ha! Ha! (哈哈哈)			
2008	The One Man Olympics (一个人的奥林匹克)			
2008	Gun of Mercy			
2010	You Deserve To Be Single	Xiao Feng		
2010	My Belle Boss (我的美女老板)	Cousin		
2011	I Phone You	Yu Guanghao		
2014	Live a Love (2014 film)			
2014	Bull Brothers			
2015	Love, At First			
2016	Papa	Boss Du		
2017	Wished	Angus Yao		

=== Television ===
Year	Title	Role	Notes	Ref.
1992	Spirit of the Dragon	Bruce Lee		
2001	Adam's Company			
2005	Shooting Stars	George		
2017	A Chinese Odyssey: Love You a Million Years			
2019	The Legend of White Snake (2019)			
2022	Twisted Strings			
