= Bruce Lee in comics =

Bruce Lee in American comic books

Bruce Lee has been portrayed in comics form in both comic books and syndicated newspaper strips.

== Comic books ==
=== Deadly Hands of Kung-Fu ===
Issue #28 of the Magazine Management black-and-white comics magazine The Deadly Hands of Kung Fu (Sept. 1976) was an all-Bruce Lee special, including a 35-page comic-format biography written by Martin Sands, and drawn by Joe Staton and Tony DeZuniga.

=== Warrior Publications ===
Al Davison produced a 32-page one-shot titled Bruce Lee: the Elusive Dragon, released by Warrior Publications in 1983.

=== Malibu series ===
Bruce Lee

Publication information
- Publisher: Malibu Comics
- Publication date: 1994
- No. of issues: 6

Creative team
- Written by: Mike Baron
- Artist(s): Val Mayerik

Collected editions
- Bruce Lee: ISBN 978-1852866136

Bruce Lee is a 1994 six-issue comic book miniseries published by Malibu Comics and written by Mike Baron and illustrated by Val Mayerik. It focused on a fictional Bruce Lee character striving his way through gangs and rival dojo owners, while building a movie career. Malibu included a Mortal Kombat short story in the first and fifth issues.

Writer Mike Baron had previously written three issues of the Green Hornet comic published by NOW Comics, about Lee's Kato in the 1966 TV show. Val Mayerik had previously illustrated the second Kato limited series (also published by NOW). Baron states inspiration for the comic came from the 1970s Marvel Comics series Shang-Chi: Master of Kung Fu.

Titan Books collected the miniseries into a trade paperback, simply titled Bruce Lee, in 1995. The publisher Edizioni Star Comics translated the series into Italian for its ongoing series Mortal Kombat & Bruce Lee, published in 1995–1996.

=== Bluewater one-shot ===
In 2013, Bluewater Productions published Tribute: Bruce Lee, a one-shot comic book biography written by Chris Canibano and illustrated by Joon Han.

=== Magnetic Press series ===
In 2016, Magnetic Press published four issues of Bruce Lee: The Dragon Rises, co-written by Lee's daughter Shannon Lee and Jeff Kline, and illustrated by Brandon McKinney. The fictional story takes places in 2012 with Bruce Lee escaping from a science lab.

In 2018, Magnetic Press/Darby Pop Publishing released the one-shot Bruce Lee: The Walk Of The Dragon, also written by Shannon Lee.

== Comic strip ==
The Legend of Bruce Lee
- Author(s): Sharman DiVono
- Illustrator(s): Fran Matera; Dick Kulpa
- Current status/schedule: Daily and Sunday; concluded
- Launch date: May 23, 1982
- End date: 1983
- Syndicate(s): Los Angeles Times Syndicate
- Genre(s): Martial arts adventure

The Los Angeles Times Syndicate launched The Legend of Bruce Lee comic strip, featuring fictional stories about the deceased actor and martial artist, in May 1982.

The syndicate had originally approached veteran comic strip creators Milton Caniff and Noel Sickles about doing a Bruce Lee strip in 1978. The project never got off the ground, and five years later the syndicate tried again.

Intended for "downscale, . . . very young audiences", The Legend of Bruce Lee was intended to "help boost newspaper circulation by attracting younger or less well-educated readers who don't normally read newspapers". It was written by Sharman DiVono (who herself had martial arts training), and illustrated by Fran Matera (with uncredited assists from Dick Kulpa).

The Legend of Bruce Lee only ran until late 1982 or early 1983.

The strips were collected by Nostalgia World in 1983 in two 24-page magazine-sized issues.

== See also ==
- Bruceploitation
- Bruce Lee Library
- Bruce Lee filmography
- Jeet Kune Do
- List of awards and honors received by Bruce Lee
