= Jerry Poteet =

American martial artist (1936–2012)

- Born: November 29, 1936; United States
- Died: January 15, 2012 (aged 75); United States
- Style: Jeet Kune Do (Jun Fan Gung Fu)
- Teachers: Bruce Lee; Stan Lee Lawson

Other information
- Notable students: Jason Scott Lee; Michael Worth; Glenn Danzig

Jerry Poteet (November 29, 1936 – January 15, 2012) was an American martial arts instructor, recognized for his teachings in the art of Jeet Kune Do as an original Bruce Lee student.

== Biography ==
Poteet began his martial arts career in Kenpo, and became a brown belt under the Kenpo instructor Ed Parker. Poteet also trained the Dallas Cowboys football team and bodyguards in Jeet Kune Do, and choreograph the fight scenes of several films.

Poteet was chosen as the person best able to train Jason Scott Lee, for the latter's role in Dragon: The Bruce Lee Story.

In addition to choreographing Jason Scott Lee's key fight scenes in Dragon: The Bruce Lee Story, Jerry worked with him on Soldier and Timecop 2: The Berlin Decision. Other Poteet’s notable students were Glenn Danzig, Michael Worth and Kevin Sorbo.

Poteet credited his teacher, Bruce Lee, with giving him the tools to survive, "the fight of my life", when he was compelled to undergo a liver transplant in 1995. Until his death, Poteet taught Jeet Kune Do to the next generation of students and instructors. He taught martial arts for over 40 years.

The last years of Poteet's life were dedicated to preserving and refining the legacy he received from his instructor, Bruce Lee.

He died on January 15, 2012. Today, Poteet's legacy is being kept alive by protege Sifu Fran Poteet Joseph through the Jerry Poteet Jeet Kune Do Association.

== Bibliography ==
- Rafiq, Fiaz (2020). Bruce Lee: The Life of a Legend. Birlinn Ltd. ISBN 9781788853309.
