= Bruce Lee: A Warrior's Journey =

2000 American-Hong Kong documentary by John Little

- Hong Kong DVD cover

Chinese name
- Traditional Chinese: 李小龍：死亡遊戲之旅
- Simplified Chinese: 李小龙：死亡游戏之旅
Transcriptions
Standard Mandarin
- Hanyu Pinyin: Lǐ Xiǎolóng : Sǐwáng Yóuxì zhī Lǚ
Yue: Cantonese
- Jyutping: Lei5 Siu2lung4 : Sei2mong4 Jau4hei3 zi1 Leoi2
- Directed by: John Little; Bruce Lee (G.O.D. footage)
- Written by: John Little; Bruce Lee (material); Bey Logan (additional material)
- Produced by: Chris Ennis; Lee Taek-yong; John Little; Bruce Lee (co-producer of G.O.D. footage)
- Starring: Bruce Lee; Linda Lee Cadwell; John Little; Dan Inosanto; Ted Hanulak
- Edited by: Brad Kaup
- Music by: Wayne Hawkins
- Distributed by: Warner Home Video
- Release date: 22 October 2000
- Running time: 110 minutes
- Countries: United States; Hong Kong
- Languages: English; Cantonese

Bruce Lee: A Warrior's Journey
- Traditional Chinese: 李小龍：勇士的旅程
- Simplified Chinese: 李小龙：勇士的旅程
Transcriptions
Standard Mandarin
- Yale Romanization: Lǐ Syǎulúng : Yǔngshr̀ de Lyǔchéng
- IPA: [lì ɕjàʊlʊ̌ŋ jʊ̀ŋʂɻ̩̂ tɤ lỳʈʂʰə̂ŋ]
Yue: Cantonese
- Yale Romanization: Leíh Síu Lùhng : Yúhng sih dī Leuíh chìhng
- IPA: [le̬i sǐːulʊ̏ŋ jʊ̬ŋsìː tíː lɵ̬ytɕʰɪ̏ŋ]

Bruce Lee: A Warrior's Journey (Chinese: 李小龍：死亡遊戲之旅) is a 2000 documentary film about the martial artist Bruce Lee and Jeet Kune Do. The documentary includes never-before-seen behind-the-scenes footage of Bruce Lee's life, as well as parts of the original footage of his incomplete film Game of Death, which had been left out of the film.

== Plot ==
The film has five parts, the first three of which present an overview of Bruce Lee's life, including interviews of his widow, Linda Lee Cadwell, Lee's best student Taky Kimura, Hapkido Grandmaster Ji Han-jae and Kareem Abdul-Jabbar, who co-stars in "Game of Death". The last two parts include 23 minutes of the original footage of "Game of Death".

== Cast ==
- Bruce Lee (Posthumous appearance, used with archive footage)
- Kareem Abdul-Jabbar
- Dan Inosanto
- Ji Han-jae
- John Little
- Linda Lee Cadwell
- Taky Kimura
- Ted Hanulak

== Production ==
Five years after Bruce Lee's death in 1973, Golden Harvest used about 11 minutes of Lee's uncompleted original footage intended by him to become the film "Game of Death", completing the rest of their 1978 film using Lee look-a-likes. Twenty-three more minutes of Lee's original footage were considered lost for 28 years, until they were discovered by Bey Logan in 1999. John Little assembled these parts according to Lee's script notes, reflecting more accurately Lee's intentions.

== Release ==
The documentary was released on VHS and DVD by Warner Home Video. It was also released as a bonus feature on the 2004 edition of Enter the Dragon on DVD. It was released with Lee's original English and Cantonese dubbing as part of the documentary.

== Legacy ==
The dialogue of the song Be Like Water has been sampled into various Hip hop and Electronic Dance tracks and has been mentioned in academic works.

== The Story ==
Bruce Lee's enacted storyline for The Game of Death, directed in Korea (더 스토리) by John Little, distributed with the documentary in DVD as special features.
