= John Little (writer) =

Canadian writer (born 1960)

John R. Little (born 1960) is a Canadian writer and bodybuilding advocate. Little primarily focuses on martial arts, bodybuilding, and physical conditioning.

== Works ==
=== Fitness ===
He has co-authored several books with Pete Cisco, including Static Contraction Training, Static Contraction Training for Bodybuilders, Power Factor Training and The Golfer's Two-Minute Workout.

He co-authored Body by Science with Doug McGuff, M.D.

He co-authored High-intensity training the Mike Mentzer way and other books with Mike Mentzer, a known bodybuilder.

He is the author of Max Contraction Training, a sequel that expands on his interpretation of the static contraction and power factor forms of training.

=== Scholarship on Bruce Lee ===
Little is considered to be one of the world's most dedicated researchers on Bruce Lee, his training methods, and philosophies. Selected by the Bruce Lee estate, Little is the only individual who has been authorized by Lee’s estate to review the entirety of his preserved personal notes, sketches, and reading annotations, and is permitted to write and edit books on Lee's martial arts and its alleged ‘philosophical underpinnings‘.

He is the former associate publisher of Bruce Lee Magazine and the managing editor of Knowing is Not Enough, the official newsletter of the Jun Fan Jeet Kune Do, the official Bruce Lee martial arts organization.

Little's articles have appeared in many martial arts, health, and fitness magazines in North America, including Muscle and Fitness.

He is the author of The Warrior Within: The Philosophies of Bruce Lee.

His most notable work is the book The Art of Expressing the Human Body, in which he describes his findings after a five-year-long review of Bruce Lee's notes, trying to find the fighter's original bodybuilding program.

=== Advocacy of Will Durant ===
Little has devoted significant time to popularizing the works of philosopher and historian Will Durant in the 21st century. He founded the Will Durant Foundation as an effort to keep Durant's ideas and thoughts relevant in the modern era, and has attempted to revitalize Durant’s ideas by printing the historian’s previously unpublished writings through books like l Adventures in Philosophy and An Invitation to Philosophy, which feature some debates and symposiums held by Durant. Little has co-produced two documentaries about Durant using archival footage.

=== Documentaries ===
- The Art of Wong Shun Leung: A Ving Tsun Journey
- Wong Shun Leung: The King of Talking Hands
- Bruce Lee: In Pursuit of the Dragon
- Bruce Lee: A Warrior's Journey (Special features: The Story)
- Bruce Lee: In His Own Words
