= Richard Bustillo =

American martial arts instructor (1942 – 2017)

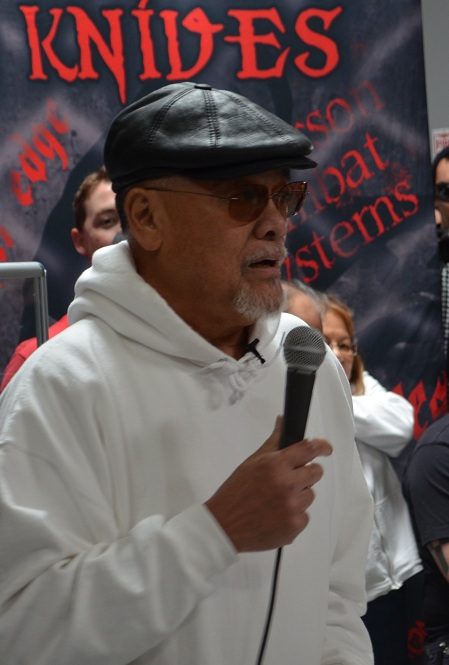
- Born: January 28, 1942; Oahu, Hawaii, U.S.
- Died: March 30, 2017 (aged 75); Torrance, California, U.S.
- Occupation: Martial arts Instructor
- Spouse: Mary Bustillo
- Children: Angela, Maka, Natalie, Lino

Richard Bustillo (January 28, 1942 – March 30, 2017) was an American martial arts instructor from Hawaii who was a student of the late Bruce Lee and an authority on Jeet Kune Do Concepts and Filipino Martial Arts.

== Martial arts ==
Bustillo began studying martial arts at the age of 8 with eskrima in his native Hawaii at the Gray YMCA Center in Palolo Valley, Hawaii under his father. He learned to box when he was 10 and competed in PAL boxing under the Veterans Boxing Club in Honolulu's Aala Park.

At the age of 14, Bustillo studied Kajukenbo with the Kempo/Karate Club of Waipahu until graduating from High School and moving to California to pursue a college education. While a college student at age 19, he competed in tournaments such as the Golden Gloves, Silver Gloves, Blue & Gold and other amateur boxing shows for Shaw's Boxing Gym in Los Angeles. At age 24 Bustillo began his study of Jeet Kune Do under Bruce Lee at the Jun Fan Gung Fu Institute in Los Angeles.

In 1967, with training partner Dan Inosanto, Bustillo researched and studied the Filipino martial arts (kali, escrima, arnis) under Angel Cabales and other instructors. This began a revival of these arts with worldwide interest. In 1976, Bustillo was promoted by Sifu Inosanto to senior instructor level in Bruce Lee's Jun Fan Jeet Kune Do. In 1978 Bustillo studied Muay Thai and achieved the title Kru (teacher) in 1985 from Thailand's former Olympian and Muay Thai Champion Veerachat "Nanfa" Satenglam.

Bustillo taught Jeet Kune Do, Filipino martial arts, Boxing, Muay Thai, wrestling, mixed martial arts and other arts at his Torrance, California school, the IMB Academy.

He was certified by the U.S. Olympic Training Center as a coach and official for U.S. Amateur Boxing in Southern California. He was a certified Guro (instructor) in the Filipino arts of Kali, Escrima, and Arnis; holding eleven degree black belt (under SGM Cacoy Canete in November 2011) and the title Grand Master by the Doce Pares organization of Cebu City, Philippines. Bustillo was a member of the Black Belt Hall of Fame (Instructor of the Year 1989) and the World Martial Arts Hall of Fame. Bustillo was recognized by the Council of Grandmasters of the Philippines as ninth degree Black Belt (Grandmaster) in Doce Pares.

Bustillo was a certified law enforcement defensive tactics instructor and a member of the American Society of Law Enforcement Trainers. Additionally, Bustillo was a member of the Search & Rescue Team of the Los Angeles County Sheriff's Department and was a Reserve Peace Officer.

He continued to train with martial artists such as the Machado (Brazilian) Jujitsu USA Team. In addition, he was well known for promoting the Filipino Martial Arts. Bustillo was a founding member of the Bruce Lee Foundation and was the Jeet Kune Do Instructor to Bruce Lee's children, Brandon Lee and Shannon Lee.

== Legacy ==
Together, with Guro Dan Inosanto, Bustillo is credited with generating worldwide interest in the study of Jeet Kune Do and Filipino Martial Arts.

In 1976, Bustillo and Inosanto founded the Filipino Kali Academy in Torrance, California. Shortly after this school was founded, Bustillo became popular as a workshop instructor, even teaching Martial Arts to the Dallas Cowboys under coaches Tom Landry and Bob Ward with Dan Inosanto.

He founded the IMB Academy in Carson, California, in 1984. He later moved the school to nearby Torrance, California.

Bustillo died on March 30, 2017. IMB Academy continues to run under longtime IMB Academy students Esteban De LA Cruz and Nicole Mangabat.
