= Bruce Y. Lee =

American academic

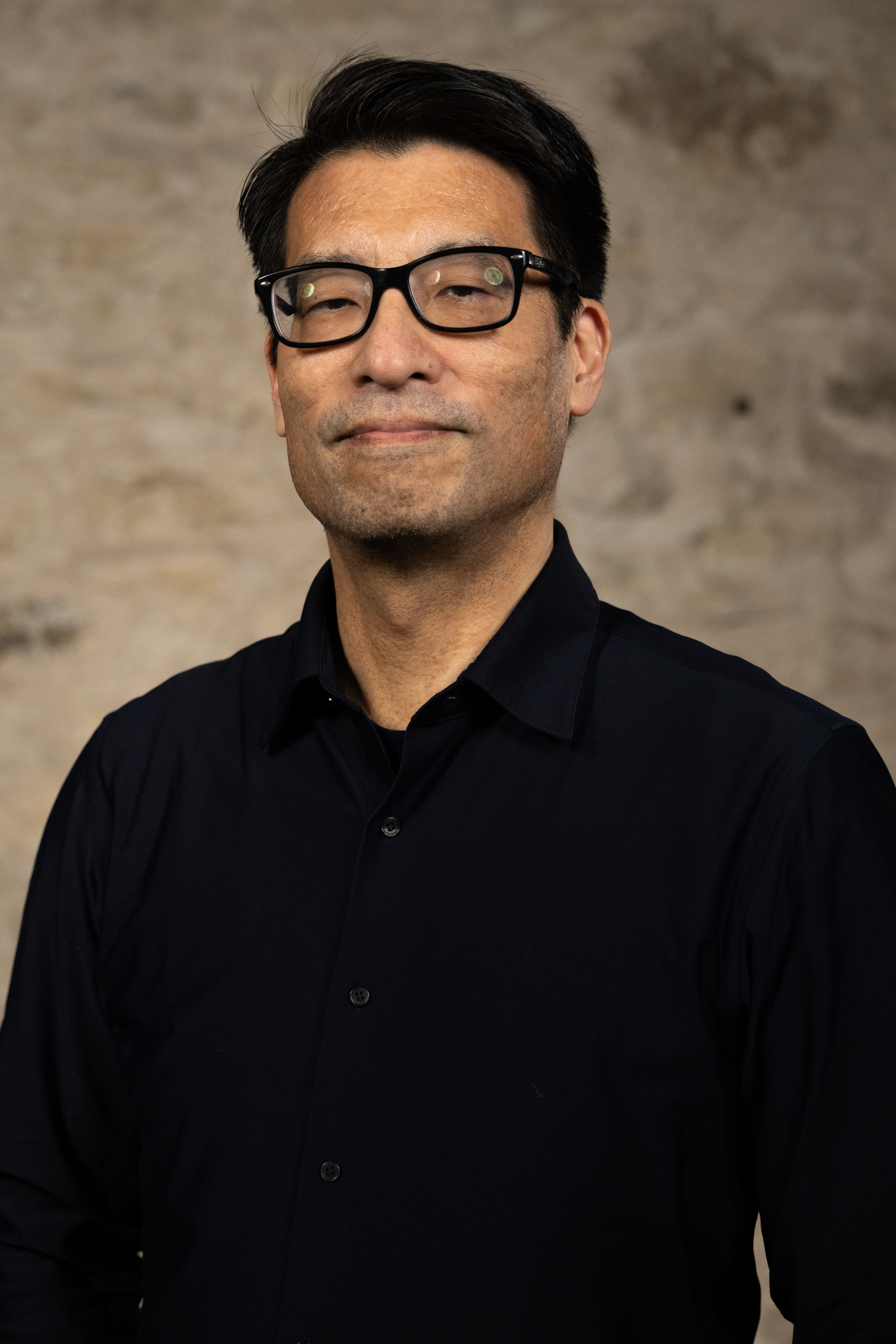
Image of Bruce Y. Lee

Bruce Y. Lee is a computer modeler, writer, journalist, professor, and physician who builds and applies computer modeling and artificial intelligence (AI) in health. He is a professor at the CUNY Graduate School of Public Health and Health Policy. He was previously an associate professor at the Johns Hopkins School of Public Health, executive director of the Global Obesity Prevention Center (GOPC) and associate professor at the University of Pittsburgh.

He holds a B.A. from Harvard University and an M.D. from Harvard Medical School, and completed his internal medicine residency training at the UC San Diego School of Medicine. He also holds an M.B.A. from the Stanford Graduate School of Business.

Lee is the founder and executive director of Public Health Informatics, Computational, and Operations Research (PHICOR) which builds and utilizes computer models to understand and address issues in health, including the COVID-19 pandemic. He is a senior contributor for Forbes, where he covers science and health.

In 2023, Lee became a member of the National Academies of Sciences, Engineering, and Medicine (NASEM)'s roundtable on obesity solutions. Dr. Lee is also the Chair of NASEM's Standing Committee on Evidence Synthesis and Communications in Diet and Chronic Disease Relationships and member of NASEM's Evaluating the Process to Develop the Dietary Guidelines for Americans, 2020-2025 committee. Additionally, Dr. Lee was on the committee for Redesigning the Process for Establishing the Dietary Guidelines for Americans. Previously, Lee was the associate editor for the peer-reviewed medical journal, Vaccine.

== Journalism ==
Dr. Lee is a Senior Contributor for Forbes, covering a wide range of health-related topics including medicine, wellness, digital health, and the business of health and having written over 1,600 articles with many of them having been selected as Editors Choices. His articles have been read over 87 million times since January 2019. He is a regular contributor for Psychology Today, where he has a regular blog called "A Funny Bone to Pick", writes the “Minded by Science” newsletter, and serves on the D.C. Science Writers Association (DCSWA) board as well. Additionally, his writing has appeared in a number of other media outlets including The New York Times, Time, The Guardian, MIT Technology Review, STAT, and HuffPost.

== Awards ==
Lee and his team's research on COVID-19 vaccination was awarded the American Journal of Preventive Medicine 2020 Article of the Year.
