= Jason Scott Lee =

American actor and martial artist (born 1966)

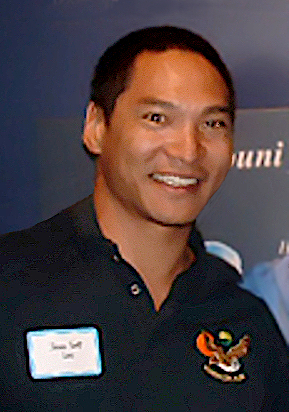
- Lee in 2003
- Born: November 19, 1966 (age 59); Los Angeles, California, U.S.
- Occupations: Actor; martial artist
- Years active: 1987–present
- Spouse: Diana Chan (m. 2008)

Jason Scott Lee (born November 19, 1966) is an American actor and martial artist. He played Mowgli in Disney's 1994 live-action adaptation of The Jungle Book and Bruce Lee in the 1993 martial arts film Dragon: The Bruce Lee Story.

== Personal life ==
Lee was born in Los Angeles. He was raised in Hawaii and is of Hawaiian and Chinese descent. He attended school at Pearl City High School.

== Career ==
Lee started his acting career with small roles in Born in East L.A. (1987) and Back to the Future Part II (1989). In 1990, he appeared in the television film The Lookalike. In 1992, he played his first leading role in the romantic drama Map of the Human Heart. In 1993, he portrayed Bruce Lee in the biopic Dragon: The Bruce Lee Story.

Lee has trained in Bruce Lee's martial art Jeet Kune Do since portraying Lee, continued to train and became a certified instructor under former Bruce Lee student Jerry Poteet. He is not related to Bruce Lee. In 1994, he starred in Rapa-Nui and as Mowgli in the live-action adaptation of Rudyard Kipling's The Jungle Book with Lena Headey and John Cleese. Lee was originally considered for the role of Liu Kang in the 1995 film Mortal Kombat, but Lee turned down the role and was replaced by Robin Shou instead. He was also cast to star in the immigrant epic An American Dream to be filmed by Michael Cimino in 1997.

In 2007, he played Eddie in the sports comedy film Balls of Fury alongside Dan Fogler, in his first theatrically released film since 2002. Lee performed as The King of Siam in the Rodgers and Hammerstein musical The King and I in a production at the London Palladium in 2000 opposite Elaine Paige. Lee made his operatic debut in the non-singing role of Pasha Selim in Hawaii Opera Theatre's production of Mozart's Abduction from the Seraglio at the Blaisdell Concert Hall in Honolulu in February 2009.

In 2020, he played the villain Böri Khan in Disney’s Mulan, a live action remake of the 1998 animated film of the same name. He also joined the cast of the historical drama The Wind & the Reckoning as Koʻolau, a cowboy who took part in a rebellion against soldiers of the recently instated Provisional Government of Hawaii forcing the displacement of leprosy patients to the Kalaupapa Leprosy Colony in Molokaʻi. Film production happened as the COVID-19 pandemic reached its peak in the islands.

In 2021, Lee starred in the Disney+ series Doogie Kameāloha, M.D., a reboot of Doogie Howser, M.D..

== Credits ==
=== Film ===
Year	Film	Role	Notes
1987	Born in East L.A.	Paco	Film debut
1989	Back to the Future Part II	Chester "Whitey" Noguera	
1991	Ghoulies 3: Ghoulies Go to College	Kyle	
1992	Map of the Human Heart	Avik	
1993	Dragon: The Bruce Lee Story	Bruce Lee	
1994	Rapa-Nui	Noro	
1994	The Jungle Book	Mowgli	
1997	Murder in Mind	Holloway	
1998	Tale of the Mummy	Riley	
1998	Soldier	Caine 607	
2002	Lilo & Stitch	David Kawena (voice)	
2003	Dracula II: Ascension	Uffizi	Direct-to-video
2003	Timecop 2: The Berlin Decision	TEC Agent Ryan Chang	Direct-to-video
2005	Dracula III: Legacy	Uffizi	Direct-to-video
2005	Lilo & Stitch 2: Stitch Has a Glitch	David Kawena (voice)	Direct-to-video
2005	The Prophecy: Forsaken	Dylan	Direct-to-video
2005	Nomad	Oraz	Limited release
2006	Only the Brave	Glenn Takase	Limited release
2007	Balls of Fury	Eddie	
2008	Dance of the Dragon	Cheng	
2014	Seventh Son	Urag	
2016	Crouching Tiger, Hidden Dragon: Sword of Destiny	Hades Dai	
2016	Burn Your Maps	Shaman's Assistant	
2016	Alaska Is a Drag	Diego	
2019	The Haunted Swordsman	The Swordsman (voice)	Short
2020	Mulan	Böri Khan	
2021	The Wind & the Reckoning	Ko'olau	
2022	Boon	Killa	
2025	Lilo & Stitch	Luau Manager	

=== Television ===
Year	TV series	Role	Notes
1988	Matlock	Lee Tran	2, episode 2: "The Fisherman"
1989	Wolf	Chin	Season 1, episode 6: "Curtains of Silence"
1990	CBS Schoolbreak Special	John Henderson	Season 7, episode 4: "American Eyes"
1990	The Lookalike	John "Charlie" Chan	Television movie
1990	Vestige of Honor	Ha-Kuhn	Television movie
1997	The Hunger	Craig Yun	Season 1, episode 4: "The Secret Shih Tan"
2000	Arabian Nights	Aladdin	Miniseries
2010–2013	Hawaii Five-0	Detective Kaleo	3 episodes
2021–2023	Doogie Kameāloha, M.D.	Benny Kameāloha	Main Role

=== Documentary ===
Year	Documentary	Role	Notes
2006	The Slanted Screen	Himself	Documentary
2012	Secrets of Shaolin	Himself	TV documentary
2014	Trekking Malaysia with Jason Scott Lee	Himself	Travel documentary

== Honors and recognition ==
In recognition of Lee's positive impact on the image of Asians in America through his physical, attractive roles, Goldsea, the Asian American magazine website, placed him at Number 7 on its compilation "The 130 Most Inspiring Asian Americans of All Time".
