= Tao of Jeet Kune Do =

1975 book by Bruce Lee about his martial arts philosophy

- First edition
- Author: Bruce Lee
- Language: English
- Genre: Martial arts, philosophy
- Publisher: Ohara Publications Inc.
- Publication date: 1975
- Publication place: United States
- OCLC: 1959408

Tao of Jeet Kune Do is a book expressing Bruce Lee's martial arts philosophy and viewpoints, published posthumously (after Bruce Lee's death in 1973). The project for this book began in 1970 when Bruce Lee suffered a back injury during one of his practice sessions. During this time he could not train in martial arts. He was ordered by his doctors to wear a back brace for 6 months in order to recover from his injury. This was a very tiring and dispiriting time for Lee who was always very physically active.

It was during his convalescence that he decided to compile a treatise on the system or approach to martial arts that he was developing; he called it Jeet Kune Do. The bulk of these writings would become the "core set of writings". Many of these writings were done during a single session which provided natural continuity. Lee had also kept various notes throughout the development of his combat philosophy and these would become the disparate notes used in the book. Many of these notes were "sudden inspirations" which were incomplete and lacked any kind of a construct. The combination of the "core set of writings" and the "disparate notes" would be known as the text Tao of Jeet Kune Do.

In 1971, it was Lee's intent to finish the treatise that he started during his convalescence. However, his film career and work prevented him from doing so. He also vacillated about publishing his book as he felt that this work might be used for the wrong purposes. Lee's intent in writing the book was to record one man's way of thinking about the martial arts. It was to be a guidebook, not a set of instructions or "How to" manual to learn martial arts.

In 1975, after Bruce Lee's death, his widow Linda Lee Cadwell decided to make available the information her husband had collected. Lee's untimely death changed the perspective of releasing the information that Bruce Lee had vacillated about. The "core writings" and various notes were put together in a logical fashion by various editors. The main editor was Gilbert L. Johnson, with Linda Lee, Dan Inosanto and other students of Bruce Lee helping him understand Jeet Kune Do well enough to editorialize and organize Lee's material into text.

The book is dedicated to: The Free, Creative Martial Artist. Lee's wife, Linda Lee Cadwell holds the copyright to the book. The book is attributed to Bruce Lee as his notes and work were used to compile the book. Although Lee's material was utilized, it was not organized by him; therefore Bruce Lee was not strictly its author.

== Bruce Lee's autobiography ==
Tao of Jeet Kune Do was compiled posthumously from Bruce Lee's personal notes, some of which were in turn copied from Bruce Lee's personal library of martial arts and philosophical books. Ohara Publications has acknowledged Edwin Haislet, Hugo and James Castello, Roger Crosnier and Julio Castello as original sources. After the book's initial publication, additional passages were discovered to have been sourced from the works of D.T. Suzuki, Eric Hoffer, and other authors. Many of Bruce Lee's statements are derived from his own studies of various schools of philosophy and the martial arts, and are sometimes paraphrases of previous expressions by others which he wrote down for his own instruction into his own words.

== 1975 1st edition ==
Cover of the 2006 Limited Edition Collector's Edition book with certificate of authenticity.

In 1975 the Tao of Jeet Kune Do was first made available only in paperback. The book was first made available in hardback in 1976. Subsequent editions have been available in paperback form only except for the following; In 2006, Black Belt Magazine offered this book in hardback form, on a 500-copy Limited Collector's Edition; the book is personally signed by Bruce Lee's widow Linda Lee Cadwell and his daughter Shannon Lee. Copies of the hardback edition from such sources as eBay typically fetch high prices and usually do not include the much sought after dust jacket.

== See also ==
- Bruce Lee Library
- Bruce Lee's Fighting Method
- Chinese Gung Fu: The Philosophical Art of Self-Defense
- Jeet Kune Do
