= Jun Fan Jeet Kune Do =

Jun Fan Jeet Kune Do is both an informal classification of Bruce Lee's fighting methods and training practices from 1965-1973, as well as a formal attempt in the late 1990s to form an organization and concrete syllabus around Jeet Kune Do, by Bruce Lee's widow Linda Lee and 19 of Lee's former students and colleagues.

The first summit of the "Jun Fan Jeet Kune Do Nucleus" was held on January 10–11, 1996. In their newsletter, it was declared: "The Nucleus decided that Jun Fan Jeet Kune Do would be an organization," and that, "Jun Fan Jeet Kune Do should refer only to the teaching of Bruce Lee (including his) set of basic technical, scientific, and philosophical principles."

At the time, many protested by citing Bruce Lee's own declarations that apparently contradicted the agenda of the Nucleus members, such as:

"Jeet Kune Do is not a method of classified techniques, laws, and so forth, that constitute a system of fighting."

"Jeet Kune Do is not an organized institution that one can be a member of. Either you understand or you don't, and that is that... Organized institutes tend to produce patternized prisoners of a systematized concept, and the instructors are often fixed in a routine."

"A JKD man who says JKD is exclusively JKD is simply not in with it... A person cannot express himself fully and totally when a partial set structure or style is imposed upon him.

"JKD is not a form of special conditioning with a set of beliefs and a particular approach. So basically it is not a “mass” art. It does not look at combat from a certain angle but from all possible angles because it is not based on any system... JKD is the absence of a system of stereotyped techniques."

"Jeet Kune Do uses all ways and is bound by none, and likewise it uses any techniques or means that serve its end. In this art, efficiency is anything that scores... Let it be understood once and for all that I have not invented a new style, composite or modification. I have in no way set Jeet Kune Do within a distinct form governed by laws that distinguish it from "this" style or "that" method... Therefore, to attempt to define JKD in terms of a distinct style — be it kung fu, karate, street fighting or Bruce Lee's martial art — is to completely miss its meaning. Its teaching simply cannot be confined within a system."

By August 1996, one of its key members, Dan Inosanto, had left. This was acknowledged by the other Nucleus members in their January 1997 newsletter: "Dan Inosanto has since chosen not to play an active role in the Nucleus." By the early 2000s, the organization had disbanded and ceased operations completely.

In the modern day, Jun Fan Jeet Kune Do/Jun Fan JKD/JFJKD continues to exist as an informal classification by JKD practitioners wishing to draw a distinction between Bruce Lee's personal application of Jeet Kune Do and that of others. Though, in line with Bruce Lee's own documented beliefs, it does not constitute an official style or system with a defined syllabus that was either recognised or endorsed by Lee himself.
