= Bruce Lee: The Lost Interview =

- Directed by: Michael Rothery
- Produced by: Elsa Franklin
- Starring: Bruce Lee; Pierre Berton
- Release date: 2 November 1994
- Running time: 25 minutes
- Country: Canada
- Language: English

Bruce Lee: The Lost Interview is the name given to the 9 December 1971 edition of The Pierre Berton Show, which featured martial artist/actor Bruce Lee in his only English speaking television interview. Its title is derived from its status; it was presumed lost for several years until its rediscovery and airing on 2 November 1994. Over the course of the interview, which was filmed in Hong Kong, Bruce Lee and Pierre Berton discuss Lee's career, various aspects of martial arts philosophy and the inherent problems faced by an Asian in pursuing stardom in Hollywood. A review of the interview by Bill Stockey said that Bruce Lee's "human side is exposed and he is portrayed as more approachable".

== Interview summary ==
In the first few minutes of the interview, Bruce Lee asserts that he speaks Cantonese and reveals that he does not actually speak Mandarin despite his successes starring in many Mandarin movies. He discloses the fact that he just mouths the words while they shoot the Mandarin film, but someone else's voice is played over his for when the final movie is released.

Berton asks about Bruce Lee's career in terms of his shift from martial arts to his role as an actor in various movies, to which Lee says that he never expected that his love of martial art would lead to him becoming an actor in movies. Bruce Lee goes further into his martial arts career and talks about how it shaped him into the person he has become (as an actor, martial artist, and human being). Lee also asserts that he has never had a stunt double in any movie that he has acted in.

Berton then questions him about his acting career and the martial arts school that he set in up in Hollywood. Bruce Lee explains that he set up the school to teach martial arts like judo, karate, and Chinese boxing to people like James Garner, Steve McQueen, Lee Marvin, and James Coburn in order to help them to learn how to express their feelings (e.g. anger, determination, pride or happiness) through movements of the body. Lee says that the school was not set up to train people for acting roles, but rather to teach the art of expressing the human body in combated form (he also demonstrates the different types of combat movements as he speaks).

Lee also talks about his future career in Hollywood and discusses which series he is going to be in. He talks about the differences in Western and Eastern media that he noticed, such as the likelihood of violence occurring more often in Western films in day-to-day activities. When talking about Western media, he says that there is a lack of the true oriental person being portrayed in the media i.e. there are constant depictions of stereotypes (e.g. pigtails, slim eyes) in Western media.

Berton asks about the problems he has faced as an Asian in Western society in terms of fears of not being accepted by Western audiences, and Lee says it is not a strange occurrence to be unaccepted because it is even seen as a business risk for most film producers. This is because of the idea that the general audience will perceive the actor as foreign. He explains that it is the same in Asia when a foreigner is seen in the media. He also says that when he does Chinese films, he tries not to act as Western as he normally would because he wouldn't want to be perceived as different from other Chinese people. However, when he goes back to the United States, it is the other way around because he is perceived as an exotic person so the film producers try to get him to do things for the sake of being exotic or foreign.

Berton also asks if Lee considers himself American or Chinese to which he explains that he would like to think of himself as a human being. He says:

"You know what I think of myself? As a human being, because I mean I don't want to be like as Confucius say, but under the sky, under the heavens, there is but one family. It just so happens that people are different."
