= Bruce Lee: The Man Only I Knew =

1975 book by Linda Lee Cadwell

- Book cover
- Author: Linda Lee Cadwell
- Language: English
- Subject: Bruce Lee
- Publisher: Warner Books Inc
- Publication date: April 1975
- Publication place: United States
- Media type: Print (Paperback)
- Pages: 207
- ISBN: 0-446-78774-4

Bruce Lee: The Man Only I Knew (ISBN 9780446894074) is a 1975 book about martial arts legend Bruce Lee, written by his widow, Linda Lee Cadwell.

== Background ==
The book was written very close to the time of Bruce Lee's death, thus being very close in Cadwell's memories. It is different from the one she wrote many years later.

The book was then the basis for the movie Dragon: The Bruce Lee Story starring Jason Scott Lee (no relation) as Bruce Lee and Lauren Holly as Linda Emery (her maiden name).

At least three printings (April, June, August, 1975) of this book exist by Warner.
