= List of awards and honors received by Bruce Lee =

This is a list of Bruce Lee's awards and honors. He was a martial artist, an actor, a film director and producer, a screenwriter, an instructor of martial arts, an author, a philosopher, a tai chi practitioner and a cha-cha dancer from the United States and British Hong Kong.

== Awards ==
- The Asian Awards: Founder's Award (2013).
- Martial Arts Industry Association: Lifetime Achievement Award — Australia (2011).
- General Administration of Sport of China | All-China Youth Federation — Lifetime Achievement Award (2005).
- Hong Kong Film Award for Star of Century (2005).
- EMMA (Ethnic Multicultural Media Academy): Legend Award — London (2004).
- Chinese Wushu Association: Supreme Movie Star Award (1998).
- Government of Puerto Rico: Recognition Award making Aguadilla City the home of Bruce Lee in Puerto Rico (1998).
- Hong Kong Film Award for Lifetime Achievement (1994).
- Taipei Golden Horse Film Festival and Awards: Special Jury Award (1972). Also, Best Feature Film, Fist of Fury — Runner-up.
- National Karate Championship — Washington, D.C.: Guest of Honor (1970); Special Guest (1969); Guest Judge (1968); Appreciation Award (1967).
- Wally Jay | Island Judo Jujitsu Club, Alameda, California — Commemorative Exhibition Award (1964).
- Long Beach International Karate Championships: Karate Championship Award for his "contribution" (1964).
- Hong Kong Inter-School Boxing Championship (1958).
- Crown Colony Cha-Cha Championship — Hong Kong (1958).

== Titles and tributes ==
- In 2012 and 2020, the United States House of Representatives remembered Bruce Lee with congressional tributes recognizing "the immense impact that Bruce Lee had on American and global popular culture" and "the 80th birthday of Bruce Lee and the immense and positive impact that his legacy continues to have", respectively.
- In 2004, Enter the Dragon starring Bruce Lee was selected by National Film Registry in order to be preserved by the Library of Congress in the United States, given its cultural significance.
- In 1979, with the master of ceremonies Joe Green, the Mayor of Los Angeles, Tom Bradley, officially proclaimed June 8 as Bruce Lee Day.

Where as Bruce Lee gained international fame and motion picture superstar status as one of the world foremost martial arts practitioners and, Where as Columbia Pictures in association with Golden Harvest Films and Raymond Chow Productions is releasing Mr. Lee's last motion picture, Game of Death, on Friday June 8, 1979, and Where as Bruce Lee's teachings remain the ultimate criteria for martial arts, I do proclaim it Bruce Lee Day tomorrow in Los Angeles.

- On October 21, 2000, and October 3, 2014, Bruce Lee Day in San Francisco and Bruce Lee Day in Seattle were proclaimed, respectively.
- In 1972, Bruce Lee was selected as one of the Top 10 Movie Stars by Overseas Chinese Daily News.
- According to The Guinness Book of World Records, Bruce Lee holds seven unbroken titles. He could do 400 push-ups on one hand, 200 on two fingers and 100 on one thumb. Bruce Lee could also punch 9 times in one second while his "one-inch punch" technique could force a 75 kg opponent 6 meters away, to name but a few. (Check Long Beach International Karate Championships)
- In 1999, Bruce Lee was named among TIME Magazine's 100 Most Important People of the Century as one of the greatest heroes & icons, as an example of personal improvement through, in part, physical fitness, and as one of the most influential martial artists of the twentieth century.
- In 1999, Bruce Lee was listed in The Movie Book: Big Ideas Simply Explained as one of the 500 people who made "a landmark contribution to the medium of film".
- In 2003, People Magazine (VH1: Special Collector’s Edition) named Bruce Lee as one of the 200 Greatest Pop Culture Icons.
- In 2004, UFC President, Dana White, credited Bruce Lee as the "Father of Mixed Martial Arts".
- In 2005, Bruce Lee was named as one of Variety Magazine's Icons of the Century.
- On 31 March 2007, Bruce Lee was named as one of "History's 100 Most Influential People, Hero Edition", a survey that was televised by the Nippon Television Network, Japan's largest broadcast system.
- In 2013, Bruce Lee was named as one of the Fifty Greatest Athletes Of All Time by Sports Illustrated.
- Spike TV dedicated 10 hours of programming to Bruce Lee, "The Greatest Martial Artist Of All Time".
- Bruce Lee has been remembered through different films, series and documentaries such as: The Legend of Bruce Lee, aired in many countries worldwide; Be Water, which won the Gold List Award; I Am Bruce Lee, which received Leo Awards. There are also numerous books about Bruce Lee such as: Bruce Lee: A Life, by Matthew Polly; Beyond Bruce Lee, by Paul Bowman; Striking Distance, by Charles Russo. (Check Bruce Lee filmography and library)
- Bruce Lee claims a film subgenre and a trend related to him: Bruceploitation. After his death, several actors assumed Lee-like stage names: Bruce Le, Bruce Li, Bruce Ly, Bruce Lai, etc. There were also look-alike actors ("Lee-alikes"). Although initially the word carried a negative connotation (Bruce + exploitation), today it is seen as a way to pay homage to Bruce Lee.
- Bruce Lee had an entrepreneurial spirit. In 1972, he co-founded Concord Production Inc., a film production company based in Hong Kong. He also opened institutes/studios of martial arts in Seattle (1963), in Oakland (1964) and in Los Angeles (1967). A Jun Fan Gung Fu Institute has been open for decades in Seattle, and the studio in Los Angeles reopened after nearly 50 years. Oakland named a street after the monitor of martial arts: "Bruce Lee Way". The street is located at the intersection of Broadway and Garnet. Lee's martial arts school was located in that area.
- Steve Palmer, a long-time fan of Bruce Lee, manages two websites as a tribute to the legendary martial artist: The Web's Most Comprehensive Visual History of Bruce Lee's Life; A Complete Guide to Bruce Lee's Classic 1963 Book. Bruce Lee's official websites are managed by his daughter Shannon Lee, who runs Bruce Lee Enterprises, LLC and the Bruce Lee Foundation.
- In 2001, the hip-hop band from Hong Kong LMF released a song called "1127" (Lee's birthday).
- In 2008, Nokia launched a cellphone to honor Bruce Lee: Nokia N96 Bruce Lee Limited Edition. The ad of Bruce Lee playing table tennis with nunchucks went viral.
- In 2012, French perfume manufacturer Chkoudra Paris launched Bruce Lee's three fragrances: Don’t Think, Feel; Be Water; Anger Blinds.
- In 2015, Hublot, a luxury watchmaker from Switzerland, released The Hublot Spirit of Big Bang Bruce Lee, a 75-piece limited edition to commemorate Bruce Lee's 75th birthday.
- In 2015, the Singapore Mint presented two commemorative coins: Legend of the Dragon and Legend of JKD (Jeet Kune Do), to celebrate Bruce Lee's 75th birth anniversary.
- On 27 November 2020, Hongkong Post, a government department of Hong Kong in charge of postal services, launched "a special stamp issue and associated philatelic products" to commemorate Bruce Lee's 80th anniversary.
- In 2020, Casio released the Casio G-shock MR-G Bruce Lee Collaboration Model, a series of shock-resistant watches, in order to celebrate 80 years of Bruce Lee.
- In 2020, 2018, 2016, 2014, Bruce Lee featured in EA Sports UFC game as a bonus unlockable fighter. He was the most-used fighter in the first edition of EA Sports UFC, chosen 3.41 million times.
- In 2020, Bruce Lee was honored with a seven-disc Blu-ray collection called Bruce Lee: His Greatest Hits by Criterion.
- In 2021, Xiaomi launched Redmi K40 Bruce Lee Special Edition, a black and yellow Android smartphone inspired by the jumpsuit Lee wore in his last film Game of Death.
- In 2021, the largest sports media property in Asia, ONE Championship, launched ONE x Bruce Lee collection (jackets, hoodies, t-shirts, shorts, joggers and other accessories). There is also a collection launched by Mitchell and Ness.
- In 2022, Ethernity launched a non-fungible token (NFT) collection called “The Formless Form” to honor Bruce Lee.
- VR technology has been used to launch Bruce Lee's Hong Kong Home in the Metaverse aimed at culture preservation.
- Li-Ning, one of the top sports brands in China, released two basketball shoes models: 2022 Bruce Lee Li-Ning Way of Wade IX WOW9 and Way of Wade All City 9 V2 BOA.
- Nike has released sneakers Kobe 5 Protro Bruce Lee and a wide range of models. There are also Converse tennis shoes in honor of Bruce Lee.
- There are numerous toys/games: Bruce Lee Tiger Electronics Handheld Game, Bandai Bruce Lee S.H. Figuarts Action Figure, etc.
- Kungfu, a fast-food chain in China, has used a logo that resembles Bruce Lee since 2004.

== Monuments and memorabilia ==
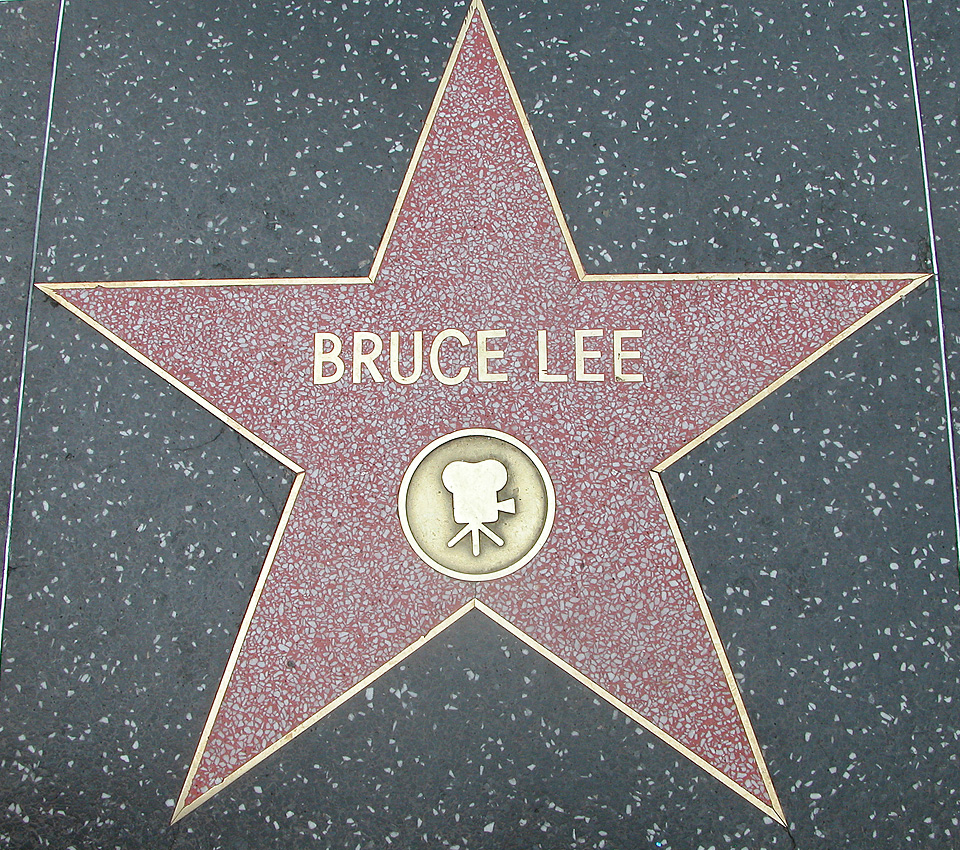
Star on the Hollywood Walk of Fame

- In 1993, Bruce Lee received a star on the Hollywood Walk of Fame.
- In 2010, Madame Tussauds museum in Hollywood honored Bruce Lee with a wax effigy.
- On 26 November 2005, the city of Mostar in Bosnia and Herzegovina honored Bruce Lee with a bronze statue on the Spanish Square. The statue was the first public monument to Bruce Lee officially unveiled in the world, with another bronze statue in Hong Kong being revealed one day later, marking Lee's 65th birthday.
- The Bruce Lee statue in Hong Kong unveiled in 2005 as well as a star received in 2004 are located on the Avenue of Stars near the waterfront at Tsim Sha Tsui.
- In 2011, a new bronze statue of Bruce Lee was unveiled by the Kogarah Council, Australia. The statue was presented by the People's Government of Shunde, Lee's ancestral home in mainland China, to commemorate Friendship City Agreement's one anniversary.
- Another bronze statue of Bruce Lee was unveiled in Chinatown, Los Angeles, in 2013, memorializing the prominent martial artist.
- A Bruce Lee theme park with a giant bronze statue (18.8 meters tall) was built in Bruce Lee's ancestral home in Foshan, China. Bruce Lee Paradise began operation in 2005, and the giant statue was erected five years later. There is also a red-painted, 30-meter-tall ceramic statue of Bruce Lee erected by China Kung Fu Pavilion, which has featured 50 ceramic statues of the legendary King of Kung Fu.
- In 1998, Bruce Lee was honored with a "Lifetime Achievement Award" plaque by the Asian American Arts Foundation at the Chinese Hospital in San Francisco, where he was born. In 2017, during the premiere of Birth of the Dragon, a benefit for the hospital, film director George Nolfi and actor Philip Ng presented a commemorative plaque.
- In 1999, he was the first martial artist that was introduced to the Martial Arts History Museum Hall of Fame.
- In 2015, Bruce Lee was inducted into California Museum's Hall of Fame by Governor Jerry Brown. The honor was accompanied by a year-long exhibit.
- On 6 September 2022, the University of Washington, Bruce Lee's alma mater, officially dedicated him Bruce Lee Ascending by Han Eckelberg, a permanent art installation at the UW Odegaard Undergraduate Library staircase. Though Lee did not graduate from the UW, he was awarded an Honorary Doctorate Degree in 1972.
- Bruce Lee：Kung Fu ‧ Art ‧ Life exhibition, presented by Government of Hong Kong's Leisure and Cultural Services Department, co-hosted by Hong Kong Heritage Museum and the Bruce Lee Foundation in the U.S., and sponsored by Fortune Star Media, was launched in 2013 and extended to 2026 under the title A Man Beyond the Ordinary: Bruce Lee, for having been one of the most crowd-pleasing exhibitions. The museum "has gathered together more than 600 items of Bruce Lee memorabilia from local and overseas collectors".
- A Dragon Lives Here/Do you know Bruce? exhibit (2014–present) has been organized by the Wing Luke Museum in Seattle, in partnership with the Bruce Lee Foundation, and sponsored by many entities: US Bank; United States Federal Government's agencies Institute of Museum and Library Services, National Endowment for the Arts and National Endowment for the Humanities; Delta; etc. The exhibit was awarded by the Association of King County Historical Organizations in 2015, and the Wing received the IMLS National Award.
- Other exhibits include We Are Bruce Lee: Under the Sky, One Family (Bruce Lee Foundation and Chinese Historical Society of America), Be Water, My Friend — Legend of Bruce Lee Memorial Exhibition (Bruce Lee Foundation and Hublot at Beijing SKP) and Bruce Lee "Alive" (Bruce Lee Foundation and Hong Kong International Airport).
- In 1972, Bruce Lee was inducted into the Black Belt Hall of Fame by Black Belt Magazine.
- In 1999, Bruce Lee was inducted into the Martial Arts History Museum Hall of Fame as one of its 10 inaugural members.
- In 2003, Latin American Martial Arts Society Worldwide inducted Sijo Bruce Lee into the Hall of Fame as a Martial Arts Legend.
- In 2013, Bruce Lee was inducted into IGN's Action Hero Hall of Fame.
- In 2016, Bruce Lee was inducted into the Asian Hall Of Fame by the Robert Chinn Foundation.
- In 2020, Bruce Lee was inducted into the Hall of Fame by the Online Film & Television Association.

== See also ==
- Bruce Lee Library
- Bruce Lee filmography
