= Dragon: The Bruce Lee Story (video game) =

1994 video game

- North American Sega Genesis cover art
- Developer: Virgin Interactive Entertainment
- Publishers: Virgin Interactive Entertainment: Genesis; NA: Acclaim Entertainment Game Gear; EU: Virgin Interactive Entertainment; NA: Acclaim Entertainment Master System; EU: Virgin Interactive Entertainment Jaguar; NA/EU: Atari Corporation; JP: Messe Sansao, Inc. Super NES; EU: Virgin Interactive Entertainment; NA: Acclaim Entertainment
- Director: Colin Gordon
- Producer: Daniel Marchant
- Designers: Daniel Marchant; Ian Mathias; John Palmer
- Programmers: Dave Chapman; Ronald Pieket-Weeserik
- Artists: Jon Green; Mark Anthony; Mark Smith
- Composer: Allister Brimble
- Platforms: Atari Jaguar, Game Gear, Master System, Sega Genesis, Super NES
- Release: Genesis: EU: September 1994; NA: 1995; Game Gear: EU: February 20, 1995; NA: 1995; Master System: EU: February 20, 1995; Jaguar: NA: 28 November 1994; EU: 28 November 1994; JP: July 1995; Super NES: EU: 23 February 1995; NA: July 1995
- Genre: Fighting
- Modes: Single-player, multiplayer

Dragon: The Bruce Lee Story is a fighting video game developed and originally published by Virgin Interactive Entertainment in Europe for the Sega Genesis in 1994. It is based on the 1993 film of the same name, which is a semi-fictionalized account of the life of Hong Kong-American actor and martial artist Bruce Lee. Following the events of the movie, players take control of Bruce Lee across several stages that takes places in different time periods of his life and fight against some of his adversaries.

Initially released for Sega platforms, Dragon: The Bruce Lee Story was later ported to the Atari Jaguar and Super Nintendo Entertainment System, each one featuring several changes and additions compared with the original version while both the Game Gear and Master System versions, which were released in 1995, feature an entirely different gameplay format.

Since its release, Dragon: The Bruce Lee Story garnered mostly a mixed reception among reviewers, with criticism directed at the slow-paced and shallow gameplay.

== Gameplay ==
Gameplay screenshot of the Sega Genesis version

Dragon: The Bruce Lee Story is a fighting game where players assume control of the titular "Dragon" and must defeat the sailor from the dance in Hong Kong, the chefs from the Chinese Restaurant in San Francisco, the martial arts master who challenges Lee, amongst others adversaries through his life to progress further in the title, recalling major action scenes from the film. However, the video game adaptation leaves out valuable plot information from the film and most of the romantic content between Bruce and his future wife Linda. Players can use a variety of martial arts moves to defeat their enemies and build up a chi meter, which can help unleash special moves on their opponents. The players have three continues, and if lost, they must fight The Phantom (the personification of Bruce's fear who takes the form of an armored Japanese Samurai) to continue, though he is near invincible. They face The Phantom Samurai again at the end as a final boss.

The game features supports for up to three players simultaneously, playing through the game co-operatively, or against each other in a battle mode. The CPU-controlled enemy characters are non-playable, and so the additional players only control clones of the same different colored such as:

- Bruce Lee
  - Wearing blue trousers (black in the SNES port).
- Bruce Li
  - Wearing green trousers (blue in the SNES port).
- Bruce Le
  - Wearing red trousers (in any port).

== Development and release ==
The producer for the video game adaptation of Dragon: The Bruce Lee Story, Daniel Marchant, stated in a 1993 interview with Mean Machines Sega that the team was against the idea of creating a beat 'em up project similar to Sega's Streets of Rage 2 (1992) and they instead opted in developing an arcade-style fighting title that was more in the lines of Street Fighter II which is also the arcade blockbuster that the developers of Streets of Rage 2 had also used as their inspiration. Dragon: The Bruce Lee Story on the other hand has beat 'em up mechanics that are rather similar to the Japanese version of Double Dragon 3: The Rosetta Stone (1990), because of the cooperative modes up to three players who fight as re-skinned clones of the same character, the abilitily for characters to wield and attack with nunchucks, and both games having the "Dragon Stomp" move when the opponent is on the ground. The sprite work for each characters consists of 100 frames of animation and the music was done by composer Allister Brimble.

Dragon: The Bruce Lee Story was first released for Sega platforms in 1994 on Europe including the Mega Drive, Game Gear and Master System, while each version of the game were developed internally at Virgin Interactive Entertainment. The Mega Drive version was also released on Australia during the same year, then in North America the next year where both it and the Game Gear version were published by Acclaim Entertainment instead, and later in Brazil as well by Tectoy. The first console port to be released outside of Europe was the Atari Jaguar conversion on 28 November 1994, which was published by Atari Corporation instead of Virgin and/or Acclaim, and this version was also released in Japan by Messe Sansao in July 1995. The second console port to be released was for the Super Nintendo Entertainment System on 23 February 1995 in Europe and later in North America on July of the same year, becoming both the last version of the game to be officially released and the final version developed by the original team. A version for the 3DO was planned but never released.

Both the Sega Genesis and the later Super Nintendo port are similar but have a number of key differences between each other besides visuals and audio such as the latter having a new introductory sequence upon starting the game, a missing intermission sequence before a bonus stage after completing two levels, among other changes. The Atari Jaguar version plays like the previous 16-bit version and contains the same game modes but has considerably more frames of animation than the Super NES and Genesis versions without running any slower that results in smoother animation, redrawn visuals, higher color palette for both stages and sprites, as well as a higher quality soundtrack. However, the Jaguar version lacks the introduction and intermission cutscenes between stages and since its release predates the launch of the Team Tap adapter, it only supports up to two players. Although the Genesis, Jaguar and SNES versions are a one-on-one fighting title, both 8-bit versions are a hybrid beat 'em up/platform game instead and the only difference between the Game Gear and Master System versions is mainly screen resolution.

== Reception ==
Reception
Review scores
Publication	Scores				
Publication	Genesis	Game Gear	Master System	Jaguar	SNES
AllGame	1.5/5	—N/a	—N/a	—N/a	2/5
Atari Gaming Headquarters	—N/a	—N/a	—N/a	4 / 10	—N/a
Computer and Video Games	75 / 100	60 / 100	—N/a	—N/a	84 / 100
Electronic Gaming Monthly	—N/a	24 / 40	—N/a	22 / 50	—N/a
Entertainment Weekly	C−	—N/a	—N/a	—N/a	—N/a
Excalibur	—N/a	—N/a	—N/a	65%	—N/a
GamesMaster	90%	—N/a	—N/a	—N/a	91%
Game Players	55%	—N/a	—N/a	—N/a	—N/a
Gamers	4+	—N/a	—N/a	—N/a	—N/a
Games World	78 / 100	—N/a	—N/a	—N/a	—N/a
Jeuxvideo.com	12 / 20	—N/a	—N/a	—N/a	—N/a
Joypad	—N/a	—N/a	—N/a	84%	—N/a
MAN!AC	67%	—N/a	—N/a	70%	70%
Mean Machines Sega	77 / 100	80 / 100	80 / 100	—N/a	—N/a
Mega	89%	—N/a	—N/a	—N/a	—N/a
Mega Force	85%	—N/a	—N/a	—N/a	—N/a
Mega Fun	73%	—N/a	—N/a	66%	73%
Mega Power	78%	—N/a	—N/a	—N/a	—N/a
Next Generation	1/5	—N/a	—N/a	3/5	1/5
Nintendo Player	—N/a	—N/a	—N/a	—N/a	5/6
Nintendo Power	—N/a	—N/a	—N/a	—N/a	12.8 / 20
Player One	82%	—N/a	—N/a	80%	—N/a
Play Time	73%	—N/a	—N/a	66%	80%
Sega Power	91%	42%	42%	—N/a	—N/a
Sega Pro	70 / 100	47 / 100	52 / 100	—N/a	—N/a
ST-Computer	—N/a	—N/a	—N/a	70%	—N/a
Super Game Power	3.8 / 5.0	—N/a	—N/a	—N/a	—N/a
Super Power	—N/a	—N/a	—N/a	—N/a	84 / 100
Total!	—N/a	—N/a	—N/a	—N/a	2+
Ultimate Future Games	—N/a	—N/a	—N/a	80%	—N/a
Video Games	71%	—N/a	—N/a	69%	—N/a
VideoGames	7 / 10	—N/a	—N/a	5 / 10	7 / 10

Dragon: The Bruce Lee Story received mixed reviews.

Reviewing the Jaguar version, Electronic Gaming Monthly called it "more or less your run-of-the-mill action fighter game". They commented that the game was released too long after the movie (which came out well over a year before) to benefit from the license. GamePro similarly commented that the game "lacks fire", elaborating that the graphics are moderately impressive, but the gameplay is crude and requires little skill due to the limited set of moves. French magazine Joypad regarded the controls better than those of the 16-bit versions. Next Generation called it "nothing truly amazing, but still good fun".

Reviewing the later Genesis port, GamePro criticized the unimaginative graphics and weak music, and summarized that "there's nothing special about this fighter". Next Generation reviewed the Genesis version of the game, writing that "Virgin was right on the money when it decided not to release Dragon. If only Acclaim had a conscience then we wouldn't have had to waste our time reviewing this retread of a game." Entertainment Weekly wrote that the characters are very stiff, and more resemble Rock'Em Sock'Em Robots than graceful martial artists.

GamePro was no more pleased with the Super NES version, saying that the game has weak graphics and sound effects, and is so simplistic that it is more of a beat 'em up than a true fighting game. A critic for Next Generation said the Super NES version plays much better than the Jaguar version, but that the game is still poor. He elaborated that "this is the only fighting game we've ever come across that not only has no special moves to speak of, but also enables you play as only one (count it, one) character, namely Bruce Lee, even in VS mode." He also criticized the fighting system.

The Jaguar version has sold nearly 20,000 copies since its release as of 1 April 1995, though it is unknown how many were sold in total during its lifetime. In 2018, Complex ranked the game 94th on their "The Best Super Nintendo Games of All Time".
