= Jeet Kune Do =

Hybrid martial art

- 截拳道
- The Jeet Kune Do Emblem; The taijitu represents the concepts of yin and yang. The Chinese characters mean: "Using no way as way" and "Having no limitation as limitation". The arrows represent the endless interaction between yin and yang.
- Also known as: JKD, Jun Fan Jeet Kune Do (Note: On January 10, 1996, the Bruce Lee Foundation decided to use the name Jun Fan Jeet Kune Do (振藩截拳道) to refer to the martial arts system which Lee founded; Jun-fan being Lee's Chinese given name.)
- Focus: Hybrid (mixed martial arts kung fu philosophy)
- Country of origin: United States
- Creator: Bruce Lee
- Famous practitioners: (see notable practitioners)
- Parenthood: Jun Fan Gung Fu: (Note: This refers to Bruce Lee's early concretized system, before he abandoned it and embraced progressive development of one's fighting ability by philosophy of Jeet Kune Do.) Wing Chun, boxing, fencing, arnis, judo, jujutsu, savate, traditional taekwondo, (Note: Martial arts practised in Korea during the 1940s and 1950s by the nine original kwans, or martial arts schools, before the formation of the Korea Taekwondo Association. Bruce Lee learned different styles of Traditional Taekwondo from various people, most notably Jhoon Goo Rhee of Chung Do Kwan style.) tai chi, catch wrestling
- Descendant arts: Non-Classical Gung Fu, Wing Chun Do, Emerson Combat Systems, Wei Kuen Do, Mixed Martial Arts (modern)

Jeet Kune Do
- Chinese: 截拳道
- Literal meaning: "Way of the Intercepting Fist"
Transcriptions
Standard Mandarin
- Hanyu Pinyin: Jiéquándào
Yue: Cantonese
- Yale Romanization: Jiht-kyùhn-douh
- Jyutping: Zit6 Kyun4 Dou6
- IPA: [tsit̚˨ kʰyn˩ tɔw˨]

Jeet Kune Do (/ˌdʒiːt kuːn ˈdoʊ/; Chinese: 截拳道; Jyutping: zit^{6} kyun^{4} dou^{6}; lit. 'stop fist way' or 'way of the intercepting fist'; abbreviated JKD) is a hybrid martial art conceived and practiced by martial artist Bruce Lee that centers on the principle of counterattacking an opponent in order to impede their offense. As an eclectic martial art, it relies on a fighting style heavily influenced by Wing Chun, tai chi, taekwondo, boxing, fencing, and jujutsu. Jeet Kune Do, which Lee intended to have practical applications in life without the traditional routines and metaphysics of conventional martial arts, also incorporates a set of principles to help practitioners make quick decisions and improve their mental and physical health.

Lee, who based Jeet Kune Do upon his experiences in unarmed fighting and self-defense, as well as upon his eclectic, Zen Buddhist, Confucianist and Taoist philosophies, did not formally codify JKD before his death. As a result, later JKD practitioners had to rely on their own interpretations of Lee's philosophy.

As a hybrid martial arts philosophy drawing from different combat disciplines, Jeet Kune Do is often regarded as a predecessor of mixed martial arts (MMA).

== Overview and philosophy ==
Growing up in Hong Kong, Lee was a student of Wing Chun Grandmaster Ip Man. Around 1964, following his duel with Wong Jack-man, Lee disavowed the rigidity of systematized martial arts. Lee then began a journey of research in order to refine his way of practicing martial arts. In 1965, he outlined the basic concepts of Jeet Kune Do in a press interview, but Lee resisted giving his school of thought a name. It was not until 1967 that he came up with the name Jeet Kune Do, but Lee's philosophy is still known by other names, such as Jun Fan Gung Fu. (Note: As in Gung Fu of Jun-fan, Bruce Lee's birthname.) As Lee explained:

I have not invented a "new style," composite, modified, or otherwise, that is set within a distinct form as apart from "this" method or "that" method. On the contrary, I hope to free my followers from clinging to styles, patterns, or molds. Remember that Jeet Kune Do is merely a name used, a mirror in which to see "ourselves". . . Jeet Kune Do is not an organized institution that one can be a member of. Either you understand, or you don't, and that is that. There is no mystery about my style. My movements are simple, direct, and non-classical. The extraordinary part of it lies in its simplicity. Every movement in Jeet Kune Do is being so of itself. There is nothing artificial about it. I always believe that the easy way is the right way. Jeet Kune Do is simply the direct expression of one's feelings with the minimum of movements and energy. The closer to the true way of Kung Fu, the less wastage of expression there is. Finally, a Jeet Kune Do man who says Jeet Kune Do is exclusively Jeet Kune Do is simply not with it. He is still hung up on his self-closing resistance, in this case, anchored down to a reactionary pattern, and naturally is still bound by another modified pattern and can move within its limits. He has not digested the simple fact that truth exists outside all molds; pattern and awareness is never exclusive. Again, let me remind you: Jeet Kune Do is just a name used, a boat to get one across, and once across, it is to be discarded and not to be carried on one's back.

— Bruce Lee

The metaphor Bruce Lee borrowed from Chan Buddhism was of constantly filling a cup with water, and then emptying it, used for describing Lee's philosophy of "casting off what is useless". Lee considered traditional form-based martial arts, which practiced pre-arranged patterns, forms and techniques, to be restrictive and ineffective in dealing with chaotic self-defence situations. Bruce Lee believed that real combat was alive and dynamic, and conceived Jeet Kune Do to enable its practitioners to adapt to the changes of live combat, believing that it was only through its use in real combat that a martial arts practitioner could judge a technique worthy of adoption.

== Principles ==
Bruce Lee incorporated into Jeet Kune Do four universal combat truths that he felt were self-evident and would lead to combat success if followed. The "4 Combat Ranges" in particular are what he felt were instrumental in becoming a "total" martial artist. This is also the principle most related to mixed martial arts. These concepts help create a framework for adaptive, real-time decision-making in self-defence scenarios.

JKD practitioners also subscribe to the notion that the best defence is a strong offense, hence the principle of "Intercepting". Lee believed that in order for an opponent to attack someone, they had to move towards them. This provided an opportunity to "intercept" that attack or movement. The principle of interception covers more than just intercepting physical attacks. Lee believed that many non-verbal telegraphs (subtle movements that an opponent is unaware of) could be perceived or "intercepted" and thus be used to one's advantage. The "5 Ways of Attack" are attacking categories that help Jeet Kune Do practitioners organize their fighting repertoire and comprise the offensive portion of JKD. The concepts of stop hits & stop kicks, and simultaneous parrying & punching were borrowed from European fencing and Wing Chun's theory of simultaneous defending and attacking. They comprise the defensive portion of JKD. These concepts were modified for unarmed combat and implemented into the JKD framework by Lee. These concepts also complement the principle of interception.

=== Be like water ===
Bruce Lee believed that martial systems should be as flexible as possible. He often used water as an analogy for describing why flexibility is a desired trait in martial arts. Water is infinitely flexible. It can be seen through, and yet at other times it can obscure things from sight. It can split and go around things, rejoining on the other side, or it can crash through things. It can erode the hardest rocks by gently lapping away at them, or it can flow past the tiniest pebble. Lee believed that a martial system should have these attributes. JKD students reject traditional systems of training, fighting styles, and the Confucian pedagogy used in traditional Kung Fu schools because of this lack of flexibility. JKD is claimed to be a dynamic concept that is forever changing, thus being extremely flexible. "Absorb what is useful; disregard that which is useless" is an often-quoted Bruce Lee maxim. A JKD student is encouraged to study every form of combat possible, both to add to his arsenal and to know how to defend against such tactics.

=== Economy of motion ===
JKD students are told to waste no time or movement. This technique can be called the technique of "least action" - strike the opponent with the least distance, time and energy possible but also giving a powerful and precise strike. When it comes to combat JKD practitioners believe the simplest things work best. "Efficiency, directness, and simplicity are the hallmark of Jeet Kune Do," according to Bruce Lee.

==== Stop hits and stop kicks ====
Adherents of JKD are taught to intercept an opponent's attack with an attack of their own, rather than simply blocking the attack. JKD practitioners consider this to be the most difficult defensive skill to develop. This strategy is a feature of some traditional Chinese martial arts, as well as an essential component of European épée fencing (known in fencing terminology as the "counter-attack").

==== Simultaneous parrying and punching ====
When confronting an incoming attack, the attack is parried or deflected and a counterattack is delivered at the same time. This is not as advanced as a stop hit but is more effective than blocking and then counterattacking in sequence. This is also practiced by some Chinese martial arts.

==== No high kicks ====
JKD practitioners believe they should target their kicks to their opponent's shins, knees, thighs, midsection, and no higher, as these targets are the closest to the (kicking) foot, provide more stability, and are more difficult to defend against. However, as with all other JKD principles, nothing is written in stone, and if a target of opportunity above the midsection presents itself, one may take advantage of it without feeling hampered by this principle.

=== The four ranges of combat ===
Jeet Kune Do students train in each of four "ranges" equally: Kicking, Punching, Trapping, and Grappling. According to Lee, this range of training differentiates JKD from other martial arts, as most traditional martial systems specialize in training at one or two ranges. Lee's theories have been especially influential in the field of Mixed Martial Arts, as the MMA Phases of Combat are essentially the same concept as the JKD combat ranges. The ranges in JKD have evolved over time. Initially, the ranges were categorized as short or close, medium, and long range. These terms proved ambiguous and eventually evolved into their more descriptive forms, although there may still be some practitioners who prefer the three categories.

=== Five ways of attack ===
- Single Angular Attack (SAA) and its converse, Single Direct Attack (SDA).
- Hand Immobilization Attack (HIA) and its counterpart, Foot Immobilization Attack (FIA), which make use of trapping to limit the opponent's function with an appendage.
- Progressive Indirect Attack (PIA) — it consists of attacking one part of the opponent's body followed by attacking another part as a means of creating an opening.
- Attack By Combinations (ABC) — it utilizes multiple rapid attacks, with volume of attack as a means of overcoming the opponent.
- Attack By Drawing (ABD) — it creates an opening with positioning as a means of counterattacking.

=== Three parts of JKD ===
JKD practitioners believe that techniques should contain the following properties:

- Efficiency — An attack that reaches its mark
- Directness — Doing what comes naturally in a learned way.
- Simplicity — Thinking in an uncomplicated manner; without ornamentation.

=== Centreline ===
The centreline refers to an imaginary line running down the centre of one's body. The theory is to exploit, control and dominate one's opponent's centreline. All attacks, defences and footwork are designed to preserve one's own centreline and open one's opponent's. Lee incorporated this theory into JKD from Wing Chun. This notion is closely related to maintaining control of the centre squares in the strategic game of chess.

The three guidelines for the centreline are:

- The one who controls the centreline will control the fight.
- Protect and maintain one's own centreline while one controls and exploits one's opponent's.
- Control the centreline by occupying it.

== Branches ==
Although Bruce Lee officially closed his martial arts schools two years before his death, he allowed his curriculum to be taught privately. Since his death, Jeet Kune Do is argued to have split into different groups. They are:

- The Original (or Jun Fan) JKD branch, whose proponents include Taky Kimura, James Lee, Jerry Poteet, and Ted Wong; these groups claim to teach only what was taught by Bruce Lee and encourage the student to further develop his or her abilities through those teachings. The inherent training principles of this branch are shaped by the static concept of what was "originally taught", just as the training systems of "traditional" martial arts have been taught for centuries and become recognizable as "styles", except it is referred to as a philosophy of "style without style".
- The JKD Concepts branch, whose proponents include Dan Inosanto, Richard Bustillo, and Larry Hartsell; these groups strive to continue the philosophy of individual self-expression through re-interpretation of combat systems through the lens of Jeet Kune Do, under the concept that it was never meant to be a static art but rather an ongoing evolution, and have incorporated elements from many other martial arts into the main fold of its teachings (most notably, grappling and Kali / Escrima material) based on the individual's personal preferences and physical attributes. According to this branch, the entire JKD "system" can be described through a simple diagram, and the concepts can then be applied to a variety of contexts in a "universal" way.

To understand the branches of JKD, it is important to understand the difference between the two "types" or viewpoints of Jeet Kune Do:

1. JKD framework: This type of JKD provides the guiding principles. Bruce Lee experimented with many styles and techniques to reach these conclusions. To Lee, these principles were truisms. The JKD framework is not bound or confined by any styles or systems. This type of JKD is a process.
2. JKD Personal Systems: This type of JKD utilizes the JKD framework along with any techniques from any other style or system to construct a "personal system". This approach utilizes a "building blocks" manner in which to construct a personalized system that is especially tailored to an individual. Lee believed that only an individual could determine for themselves what the usefulness of any technique should be. This type of JKD is thus a product.

Lee believed that this freedom of adoption was a distinguishing property from traditional martial arts.

There are many who confuse the JKD Framework with a JKD Personal System (e.g., Bruce Lee's personal JKD), treating them as one and, eventually, the same. The system that Bruce Lee personally expressed was his own personal JKD; tailored for himself. Before he could do this, however, he needed to first develop the "JKD Framework" process. Many of the systems that Bruce Lee studied were not aimed at developing his "Personal JKD" but rather was used to gather the "principles" for incorporation in the JKD Framework approach. The uniqueness of JKD to Lee is that it was a "process," not a "product," and thus not a "style" but a system, concept, or approach. Traditional martial arts styles are essentially a product that is given to a student with little provision for change. These traditional styles are usually fixed and not tailored for individuals. Bruce Lee claimed there were inherent problems with this approach and established a "Process" based system rather than a fixed style, which a student could then utilize to make a "tailored" or "Personal" product of their own.

The two branches of JKD differ in what should be incorporated or offered within the "JKD Framework". The Original (or Jun Fan) JKD branch believes that the original principles before Bruce Lee died are all that is needed for the construction of personalized systems. The JKD Concepts branch believes that there are further principles that can be added to construct personalized systems. Each branch's value can be determined by individual practitioners based on whatever merits they deem important.

Original JKD is further divided into two points of view — OJKD and JFJKD both hold Wing Chun, Western boxing, and fencing as the cornerstones of Bruce's JKD.

- OJKD follows all Bruce's training from early Jun Fan Gung Fu (Seattle period) and focuses on trapping with Wing Chun influence.
- Jun Fan Jeet Kune Do is a signature version of JKD as Bruce taught privately to Ted Wong. This is a later time period and practices a greater emphasis on elusiveness and simplified trapping unique to Bruce's later approach to combat. The focus is on fencing and Western boxing.

== Conditioning ==
Some of the exercises Lee did included Da Sam Sing, or Gak Sam Sing, a traditional forearm-conditioning method practiced in classical Kung Fu. He also did exercises simulating a fight against a four-limbed human using the traditional Mook Yan Jong used in Wing Chun. Lee was also an avid follower of Indian wrestler The Great Gama's training routine. He read articles about Gama and how he employed his exercises to build his strength for wrestling, incorporating them into his own routine. The training routines Lee used included isometrics as well as "the cat stretch", "the squat" (known as "baithak"), and also known as the "deep-knee bend."

== Influence and references in popular culture ==
Kato from Green Hornet is the first fictional character to use Jeet Kune Do, as he was portrayed by Bruce Lee in the 1966 TV series. In the aforementioned TV series, Lee would demonstrate various techniques associated with Jeet Kune Do. Following Lee's death, Kato would utilize JKD in subsequent incarnations of Green Hornet media.

In Arrow, Jeet Kune Do is the martial arts style of the League of Assassins.

The anime series Cowboy Bebop features the protagonist Spike Spiegel who employs a martial art heavily resembling Jeet Kune Do with identical various fighting principles like adopting the flexibility of water, and taking advantage of excess movements and force of the opponent are depicted in detail. This is particularly prominent in the 8th episode 'Waltz for Venus,' where Spike reluctantly mentors an enthusiastic but naive youth both verbally and through physical demonstration.

=== Fighting games ===
Various video game characters utilize Jeet Kune Do as their choice way of fighting. These include:

- Liu Kang, Johnny Cage and Mokap in Mortal Kombat
- K' in the King of Fighters uses a style notably similar to Jeet Kune Do, although his fighting style is listed in official profiles as "pure violence."
- Jacky Bryant and Sarah Bryant from Virtua Fighter
- Marshall Law, Forest Law, and Lee Chaolan from Tekken
- Midknight from Eternal Champions
- Jann Lee from Dead or Alive
- Fei Long from Super Street Fighter II
- Jon Talbain from Darkstalkers
- Chou from Mobile Legends: Bang Bang
- Clair Andrews from Ehrgeiz
- Iron Fist from Marvel Rivals

== Notable practitioners ==
- Ben Saunders
- Brandon Lee
- Bob Breen
- Danny Chan
- Dan Inosanto
- Erik Paulson
- Ernest Emerson
- Glenn Danzig
- James Wilks
- Jang Hyuk
- Jason David Frank
- Jason Scott Lee
- Jeff Imada
- Jerry Poteet
- Joe Lewis
- Junichi Okada
- Kareem Abdul-Jabbar
- Patrick Marcil
- Richard Bustillo
- Nick Irving
- Ron Balicki
- Shannon Lee
- Taimak
- Taky Kimura
- Tim Boetsch
- Tim Tackett
- Yorinaga Nakamura

== See also ==
- Tao of Jeet Kune Do
- Bruce Lee's Fighting Method
- Chinese Gung Fu: The Philosophical Art of Self-Defense
- Bruce Lee filmography
- Bruce Lee Library
- List of awards and honors received by Bruce Lee
- Bruceploitation
- Bruce Lee (comics)
- Jun Fan Jeet Kune Do

== Bibliography ==
- Assli, Salem (2002). Jeet Kune Do 'Toutes les techniques de Bruce Lee'. Editions Chiron. ISBN 2-7027-0693-2.
- Balicki, Ron; Steve Gold (2001), Jeet Kune Do: The Principles of a Complete Fighter, HNL Publishing, ISBN 0-9531766-3-0
- Beasley, Jerry (2001), The Jeet Kune Do Experience: Understanding Bruce Lee's Ultimate Martial Art, Paladin Press, ISBN 978-1-58160-131-2
- Bishop, James (2004), Bruce Lee: Dynamic Becoming, Dallas: Promethean Press, ISBN 0-9734054-0-6
- Cheng, David (2004), Jeet Kune Do Basics, Tuttle Publishing, ISBN 0-8048-3542-X
- Davis, Lamar (2001), Jun Fan/Jeet Kune Do: Scientific Streetfighting, HNL Publishing, ISBN 978-0-9531766-1-8
- Hochheim, W. Hoch (January 1995), "The Maze of Jeet Kune Do", Black Belt Magazine, vol. 33, no. 1, Rainbow Publications, Inc.
- Chris Kent; Tim Tackett (1989), Jun Fan Jeet Kune Do: The Textbook, Action Pursuit Group, ISBN 0-86568-131-7
- Lee, Bruce (1975), Tao of Jeet Kune Do, Ohara Publications, ISBN 978-0-89750-048-7
- Lee, Bruce (1978), Bruce Lee's Fighting Method, Ohara Publications, Inc., ISBN 0-89750-062-8
- Little, John (1996), The Warrior Within: The Philosophies of Bruce Lee to Better Understand the World Around You and Achieve a Rewarding Life, McGraw-Hill, ISBN 0-8092-3194-8
- Little, John (1997), Jeet Kune Do: Bruce Lee's Commentaries on the Martial Way, Tuttle Publishing, ISBN 0-8048-3132-7
- Little, John (2001), Bruce Lee: Artist of Life, Tuttle Publishing, ISBN 0-8048-3263-3
- Little, John (2002), Striking Thoughts: Bruce Lee's Wisdom for Daily Living, Tuttle Publishing, ISBN 0-8048-3471-7
- Seaman, Kevin (1999), Jun Fan Gung Fu Seeking The Path of Jeet Kune Do, S.l.: Health 'N' Life, ISBN 0-9531766-2-2
- Thomas, Bruce (1994), Bruce Lee: Fighting Spirit, Berkeley, California: Frog, Ltd., ISBN 1-883319-25-0
- Yılmaz, Yüksel (2000), Dövüş Sanatlarının Temel İlkeleri, İstanbul, Turkey: Beyaz Yayınları, ISBN 975-8261-87-8
- Yılmaz, Yüksel (2008), Jeet Kune Do'nun Felsefesi, İstanbul, Turkey: Yalın Yayıncılık, ISBN 978-9944-313-67-4
