= The Legend of Bruce Lee =

Chinese television series

- 李小龍傳奇
- Genre: Biographic; Martial arts
- Written by: Qian Linsen; Zhang Jianguang
- Directed by: Lee Moon-ki
- Starring: Danny Chan; Michelle Lang; Ted E. Duran; Hazen MacIntyre; Wang Luoyong; Natalia Dzyublo
- Opening theme: Bruce Lee's Battle Call (吶喊) performed by Emma Re
- Ending theme: Fist (拳頭) performed by Li Shu and Jin Long
- Composer: Wang Bing
- Country of origin: China
- Original languages: Mandarin; English
- No. of episodes: 50

Production
- Executive producer: Shannon Lee
- Producer: Yu Shengli
- Production locations: Hong Kong; Foshan; San Francisco; Oakland; Seattle; Los Angeles; Thailand; Rome
- Cinematography: Yuan Xiaoman
- Editor: Zhang Yifan
- Camera setup: 16:9
- Running time: 45 minutes per episode
- Production company: China International Television Corporation

Original release
- Network: CCTV-1
- Release: 12 October – 15 November 2008

The Legend of Bruce Lee (Chinese: 李小龍傳奇) is a 2008 Chinese biographical television series based on the life story of martial artist and actor Bruce Lee. The 50-episode series was produced and broadcast by CCTV and began airing on October 12, 2008. It was intended to promote Chinese culture alongside the 2008 Beijing Summer Olympics.

It stars Hong Kong actor Danny Chan as Bruce Lee and American actress Michelle Lang as Lee's wife, Linda Lee Cadwell. Giulio Taccon as Brandon Lee. The production period spanned nine months, with filming taking place in China, Hong Kong, Macau, the United States, Italy, and Thailand, and with a budget of 50 million yuan (US$7.3 million).

Lee's daughter, Shannon Lee, is credited as executive producer of the series. Other martial artists such as Mark Dacascos, Ray Park, Gary Daniels, Ernest Miller, and Michael Jai White are also featured in the series, playing the roles of martial artists prominent throughout Bruce Lee's life and career.

The Legend of Bruce Lee has seen increasing viewership since its debut in 2008. The first 14 episodes broke China's former record held by Chuang Guan Dong. According to the CSM survey held on 26 October 2008, the first 30 episodes of the series received viewership ratings above 10.35%. The finale episode attained a viewership rating of 14.87%, breaking CCTV's all-time high record set in 2003.

The Legend of Bruce Lee has been watched by over 400 million viewers in China, making it the most-watched Chinese television drama series of all time, as of 2017.

== Plot ==
=== Part One: High School Years in Hong Kong ===
Bruce Lee (Li Xiao Long) is a high school student in a school with mostly British students, with the Chinese students like him belonging in the minority. Bruce notices to his dismay that there was a subtle discrimination against his race in the school, which urges him to excel in order to prove that Chinese people are also competent and talented. Along with his childhood friend Qin Xiao Man, Bruce participates in a cha-cha competition and wins, much to the annoyance of his British schoolmate Blair Lewis. This competition, in addition to Blair's evident dislike of the Chinese, creates tension between the two, leading to a number of physical fights.

Bruce's previous run-ins with Blair had made him want to learn martial arts. He talks to Uncle Shao about this, and Uncle Shao is reluctant at first but relents to teaching Bruce some fighting techniques. Uncle Shao then also convinces Bruce's parents to have Bruce be taught martial arts by a kung fu master. Bruce meets Yellow Brat, a servant and student of Wang Yunsheng's Kung Fu Center, who he fights and loses to. Bruce's father helps him get admitted to Master Ye's Wing Chun Academy and Bruce begins his training with Master Ye.

The bitter rivalry between Blair Lewis and Bruce Lee worsened when Bruce joined the school boxing team, whose ace boxer was Blair. The two participate in the school boxing competition, and Blair loses to Bruce. Blair then realizes that unlike him, Bruce had a good chance of winning the boxing championship. He decides to help Bruce by teaching him about the three-time champion David Cafeld. This marks the end of the enmity between the two and the start of a friendship that they maintain for many years after. In the boxing championship, Bruce applies the Wing Chun techniques he has learned from Master Ye and beats David Cafeld.

Now adept at fighting, Bruce uses his skills to protect the businessmen in his neighborhood from the extortions of Wang Li Chao's gang. This angers Wang Li Chao, and he orders Ah Liang to kill Bruce. Ah Liang crashes into Bruce's bike with a motorcycle. Bruce survives the crash but goes into a coma. This incident prompts Bruce's parents to send him to America, realizing that staying in Hong Kong will inevitably lead to his death. Fearing that the attempt on Bruce's life will be traced back to his gang, Wang Li Chao orders Yellow Brat to kill Ah Liang. Meanwhile, Bruce goes to America with Uncle Shao.

=== Part Two: Late Adolescence in America ===
Bruce spends the first few weeks living at Uncle Shao's house in San Francisco. Uncle Shao then tells Bruce that he must leave Uncle Shao and have a better life. Bruce accuses Uncle Shao of getting rid of him, but he does as Uncle Shao says and leaves. He meets Jesse, an African American cab driver who cheats Bruce out of some money, but later on becomes a friend and loyal follower after Bruce saves him from some thugs. Bruce arrives at the restaurant of Ms. Ruby, a fellow Chinese and a friend of Uncle Shao's. Ms. Ruby lets Bruce live in the basement of her restaurant, and employs him as a helper and dish washer. He later quits his job in order to go to school. He enrolls at Edison Technical School, and, with the help of Jesse, was able to rent a small room and get a job of delivering papers. At the school, he meets Arroyo, and the two briefly engage in a romantic relationship. At his school's program, Bruce challenges the karate team with his Chinese Kung Fu. He angers the karate team, and they challenge him to a formal battle. Bruce agrees to fight, but only if Master Kimura, the karate expert of Seattle, will be the one to fight him and if reporters will cover the event. Kimura assents to this. He and Bruce fight, and Bruce defeats him in an astonishing eleven seconds. This makes Kimura question his beliefs about martial arts and become fascinated with Bruce's Kung Fu that he asks to be taught more about it. Bruce declines, but Kimura's persistence soon wears him down and Bruce grudgingly accepts Kimura as his student. This action of Kimura angers the Karate community. He refuses to quit learning from Bruce, and he is soon considered an outcast. Kimura becomes one of Bruce's closest friends, and they also maintain a student-teacher relationship for many years. Bruce soon shares with Kimura the secret of his Kung Fu, which is actually a mixture of moves from Wing Chun, Boxing, and even from cha-cha. This peculiar style of Bruce stems from his belief that martial arts should be practical and usable in actual combat. He therefore often takes moves from a particular style and adapts them into his own.

=== Part Three: College Years and Opening a Kung Fu School ===
Bruce passes the entrance exam at the University of Washington. Unsure of what he should major in, he asks for the advice of Professor Kane. After a lengthy discussion, Bruce decides on taking up philosophy. Bruce later applies many of what he learns at school to his martial arts. He takes a particular interest in the philosophy of Yin Yang. He also starts to teach Kung Fu for free to his schoolmates.

Kimura talks to him about opening a Chinese Kung Fu school. Bruce confesses that while it is his dream to open one, he cannot afford it. Kimura then volunteers to sell his dojo and use the money to help Bruce, but Bruce refuses, saying that he does not want to be indebted to Kimura that way. Kimura sells the dojo anyway. Bruce is enraged at first, but soon accepts Kimura's help, vowing to repay him someday.

Arroyo urges Bruce to come to the Philippines with her, where they can share a life of comfort together. Bruce tells her that he does not want to leave America because of his dream of becoming a Kung Fu master and philosopher. Arroyo expresses her dislike for Kung Fu. Bruce breaks up with her, knowing that she will never understand his passion. He then meets Linda Emery. The two start dating, and Bruce tells Linda about his dreams. She begins to share his enthusiasm with Kung Fu and even starts to take some Kung Fu lessons from Bruce.

Kimura and Bruce rent a basement for the Kung Fu school, but Linda advises them to delay the opening in order to participate in the Asian Cultural Festival, an event which she believed will serve as a good way to promote the opening of the school. Bruce agrees to this. Their promotion was going well until Bruce was challenged and defeated by Yamamoto, a 6-dan karate master who held a grudge on Bruce for speaking low of karate. Bruce demands a rematch and loses again, but he refuses to stop challenging Yamamoto.

Blair makes a reappearance in Bruce's life. He also enrolls at Bruce's school and becomes a great help to Bruce's improvement by urging his friend Professor Dan Inosanto, a Fil-Am expert on martial arts techniques, to meet with Bruce. Inosanto becomes one of Bruce's closest friends as well as his occasional advisor on martial arts. Wally Jay, a jujitsu master, piques Bruce's interest. He challenges Wally Jay in order to learn more about jujitsu techniques. At the end of the match, it was apparent that Bruce will win, but he chooses to let the duel in a draw so that Wally Jay may keep his prestige. This earns him respect from Wally Jay and the two exchange knowledge on martial arts.

Believing that only in fighting various martial arts masters can he improve his style, Bruce posts a sign at the gate of his school containing a brazen statement of challenge, "No matter the time, place or person, if I am challenged, I'll be there. –Bruce Lee." His display of arrogance angers the martial arts community and they send Yamamoto to defeat Bruce once and for all. However, now equipped with new techniques from jujitsu and wise advice from Inosanto, Bruce defeats Yamamoto.

Yamamoto finally agrees to teach Bruce some of his own karate in exchange for lessons on Bruce's Kung Fu. Bruce teaches everything he knew to Yamamoto, even if he knew that the former wasn't doing the same. This trade was actually a ruse on Yamamoto's part, which allowed another martial artist named Ed Parker to learn all of Bruce's moves. Ed Parker then fights Bruce and uses Bruce's Thrusting Punch to defeat him. Bruce ends up in a hospital due to his injuries. Ed Parker feels guilty for this afterward, realizing that what he did was dishonorable. He visits Bruce in the hospital and formally apologizes. Ed also gives his 20 years' worth of notes on karate to Bruce, which Bruce gladly uses to expand on his martial arts theories.

Linda's mother meets Bruce, and it is clear that she dislikes him. She asks Linda to break up with Bruce, but Linda refuses and leaves their home. Her mother suffers a heart attack. Bruce urges Linda to visit her mother despite their differences. He goes with Linda to the hospital and wins Linda's mother's approval.

Bruce takes part in the California Karate Competition and defeats the three-time champion, Hoffman. After the match, Hoffman approaches Bruce and they teach each other. Hoffman also talks to Bruce about moving his Kung Fu school to Oakland, where Hoffman thinks it will gain more students and attention. Bruce agrees and decides to go to Oakland immediately, to the dismay of his friends. He drops out of college and bids goodbye to Professor Kane. Linda becomes furious with him for not discussing this with her. Bruce asks her to marry him but Linda refuses. Their quarrel ends the next day when Linda realizes how much she loves Bruce and agrees to marry him. Bruce sets up their marriage at once. They have an outdoor wedding, attended by their closest friends and Linda's mother. Linda also decides to leave school. She soon gets pregnant with their first child, Brandon.

=== Part Four: Oakland ===
Bruce buys a house for him and Linda and opens a bigger Kung Fu school with the help of his friends Jesse, Kimura and Uncle Shao. The rent, however, was too expensive for Bruce, so Uncle Shao decides to lend him the money.

Meanwhile, the kung fu masters in America become enraged with Bruce for putting up a martial arts school without approaching Master Wang, the president of the Chinese Martial Arts Association in California. On top of this, Bruce also teaches many non-Chinese students, which is strictly prohibited among the Chinese. The masters challenge Bruce to an official match against Yellow Brat. Should he lose, Bruce is either to close down his school or to stop teaching non-Chinese people. But should he win, Bruce will be allowed to continue running his school whichever way he wanted. The two fight fiercely against each other, but the battle is interrupted when Linda unexpectedly goes into labor. The match is stopped, and Yellow Brat allows Bruce 15 days before they will have to fight again.

Bruce goes home to Hong Kong after receiving the grim news that his father has died. He returns to America for his match with Yellow Brat. Master Wang, seeing how the match was going to inevitably end, declares Bruce the winner. This enrages Yellow Brat, and in a fit of fury, strikes Bruce on the back with a large piece of wood. This seriously injures Bruce and paralyzes him from the waist down. He is told by his doctors that he may never walk again, let alone practice martial arts. Horrified by this news, Bruce becomes depressed and withdrawn, claiming that he would rather die than not be able to practice his Kung Fu. However, stern and encouraging words from Linda makes him become determined to walk again even while knowing it would take a miracle for him to heal. Master Wang visits Bruce along with the other Kung Fu masters. Together, they all apologize for what Yellow Brat did and knelt down to beg for Bruce's forgiveness. Bruce bids them all to rise, saying that instead of fighting amongst themselves, the Chinese must stand united. His words earned him profound respect from the masters, especially from Wang.

His paraplegia confines Bruce to a wheelchair. Unable to teach anymore, he ordered his friends to close down the school, and they reluctantly oblige. With Linda's help, Bruce writes a book about his martial arts theories. Linda decides to bring Brandon home, who had been staying with her mother since Bruce injured his back. She makes Brandon stand on his own and tells him to walk to Bruce. To Bruce's horror, Brandon starts falling. Fueled by fear for his son, Bruce reflexively reaches for Brandon, and, to his and Linda's surprise, was able to stand up. Bruce slowly regains his strength and starts training again. Together with Uncle Shao and Kimura, he decides to call his style "Jeet Kune Do". They reopen the Kung Fu school, and the news of Bruce's miraculous recovery entices many people to become his students. Bruce also decides to join the Karate national championship. Inosanto tells him that Bruce's only true rivals in the competition are Rolex, the defending champion and Piao Zhengyi, a taekwondo genius. Knowing that Bruce's current skills will not be enough to defeat Rolex, Inosanto advises Bruce to spar with Piao and exchange techniques with him. Rolex, on the other hand, was helped by Ed Parker, Yamamoto and Wally Jay.

The two finally meet in the championship match. As Bruce and Rolex are almost evenly skilled, the fight was difficult for them both. Rolex proved to be a formidable opponent, but Bruce prevails in the end. Bruce's fame in the world of martial arts piques the interest of George, a Hollywood producer. He talks to Bruce about making a movie featuring Bruce and his Jeet Kune Do. Bruce is delighted at the notion, for he feels that it was time to change the rather ludicrous portrayals of his people in movies. He saw movies as the medium through which the world would change their impressions of the Chinese.

=== Part Five: Hollywood ===
Bruce decides to pursue Hollywood. In order to do so, he leaves Oakland and moves to Los Angeles with Linda and Brandon. He also decides to leave the Kung Fu school to Kimura and Uncle Shao.

George, Bruce and the screenwriter Robert brainstorm over the movie's plot, which they then called Kung Fu. George's boss Mr. William sees the great potential in the movie; however, he was not convinced that a Chinese man like Bruce should play the lead. Without George's knowledge, William arranges for the Hollywood actor Robert Douglas to be taught Kung Fu by Bruce, so that he could be the lead actor for the movie. Bruce and George find out about William's intentions. Bruce is so enraged at the deception that he even accuses George of being in on the lie. Nevertheless, Bruce refuses to go back to Oakland, and makes a living by training Los Angeles police officers instead.

Bruce goes to Hong Kong with Linda and Brandon. He pays a visit to Master Ye, who, as it turns out, was offended when Bruce created Jeet Kune Do. He felt that Bruce was being arrogant and disrespectful. Bruce assures Master Ye that Jeet Kune Do is a practical style of fighting that owes much to Master Ye's Yong Chun Quan.

George once again comes to Bruce with a television project. Still wary of another deception, Bruce meets George with skepticism. However, George gives him a contract and a $2000 deposit upfront. This removes Bruce's doubts and he agrees to work on the TV series The Green Hornet as Kato. The Green Hornet turns into a hit series and a second season is promised, but Mr. William decides to discontinue the show.

Still determined to let Bruce star in a movie, George convinces Bruce to work on the movie Silent Flute. As with their past ideas, Silent Flute will feature kung fu. Mr. William grants George permission to make the movie, with the condition that it will be filmed in India. George and Bruce attempt to satisfy this term; however, they could not find suitable taping locations in India. George tells Mr. William about their predicament, and Mr. William confesses the truth: he has $800,000 deposited in India that he can only use in India. The only reason he had agreed to make the movie was so the money would not be wasted. Mr. William then gives them the choice of either filming in India, or cancelling the project entirely. Bruce refuses to compromise, and the movie is cancelled.

=== Part Six: Rise to Fame in Hong Kong ===
The movie industry, however, had not fully closed its doors on Bruce. The Hong Kong film company Golden Harvest seeks him out with a movie project, The Big Boss. The company president, Mr. Chow, saw Bruce Lee as the way to saving Golden Harvest from going into bankruptcy. They travel to Thailand, the shooting location for the movie. While the movie was being made, the master Thai boxer King Charles sends Bruce a letter of challenge. Bruce happily accepts the challenge but spends some time first to learn about Thai Boxing. He also tells King Charles that their duel will be filmed, and if Bruce won, he will get to use the footage in The Big Boss. He and King Charles fight, he is a formidable opponent and for a lot of the match dominated but Bruce wins. In addition to the footage of the fight, King Charles also teaches Bruce about the secret of his ferocious knee technique: heavy iron shoes, of which he gives Bruce a pair.

The Big Boss becomes a box office success and Bruce becomes a famous and sought-after movie star in Hong Kong and in other nearby Asian countries. Though he receives other offers from other companies, Bruce decides to stay with Golden Harvest, to the relief and appreciation of Mr. Chow. He gives Bruce a fully furnished house as a gift, and Linda comes to Hong Kong along with Brandon and Shannon to live with Bruce.

Bruce starts working on his second movie, Fist of Fury, but demanding beforehand that he be given the authority that a director has. Mr. Chow obliges, but this arrangement causes some friction between Bruce and the movie director, Director Ho.

Bruce had been working nonstop on the script of Way of the Dragon, a movie that he planned to direct himself. Mr. Chow is hesitant, in letting Bruce write and direct his own movie, but his doubts disappear upon reading Bruce's script. Mr. Chow also suggests that Bruce start up his own production company under Golden Harvest. This way, Bruce will be able to fulfill all of his visions. Bruce agrees and starts the production of Way of the Dragon.

=== Part Seven: International Fame and Death ===
The success of Way of the Dragon far exceeds those of Bruce's previous films, catapulting him into international stardom. Hollywood hears of his success in Asia. Mr. William, realizing his mistake in not pursuing Bruce before, sends George to offer Bruce another movie, Blood and Steel. Wary of yet another possibility of being lied to, in addition to the fact that he is currently making the movie Game of Death, Bruce refuses at first. Bruce talks to Mr. Chow, who then assures him that he may work with Hollywood. He advised Bruce to represent Golden Harvest so that the project will become a joint project between them and Hollywood. Bruce accepts the offer and postpones the making of Game of Death in order to work with Hollywood. He then changes the movie title of Blood and Steel into Enter the Dragon. In the middle of making the movie, Bruce collapses due to overwork and is rushed to a hospital.

A series of prank calls in the middle of the night starts to occur in the Lee household, promptly scaring Linda. Meanwhile, still in the hospital for further examinations, Bruce becomes bored and decides to go home despite his doctor's advice. He then receives a call from Ah Lin saying that Master Ye has died. Bruce attends the wake but does not go to the funeral. He visits Master Ye's grave afterward, expressing his fear that Master Ye is angry at him for creating Jeet Kune Do.

Perhaps influenced by Master Ye's death, Bruce buys a life insurance policy. He then resumes the production of his movie Game of Death. His head aches from time to time, but he refuses to rest, which makes Linda fear for his health.

It is then revealed that it was Yellow Brat who had been harassing Linda with the late-night phone calls. He challenges Bruce to yet another fight. Linda and Bruce talk about the Yellow Brat's challenge. Linda is against it, but Bruce argues that Yellow Brat will continue harassing them if Bruce does not accept the challenge.

Linda, Kimura, Professor Inosanto, along with Bruce's brothers from Yong Chun Quan serve as spectators in the fight. In a totally 1 sided fight where Yellow Brat fails to land a single hit Bruce defeats Yellow Brat but does not deliver a finishing blow. The scene ends with Linda offering a towel to Yellow Brat. Yellow Brat accepts the towel and appears to have a change of heart.

Bruce then visits Xiao Man's home and goes to a meeting with her and Mr. Chow to discuss their upcoming projects. Meanwhile, Linda anxiously waits for Bruce to come home. Bruce suffers another headache and complains of dizziness, so he was made to lie down on a couch. Xiao Man gives him a pain reliever and he falls asleep. He doesn't regain consciousness and was therefore rushed to a hospital, where he is then pronounced to be dead.

The last part of the episode features the original newspaper articles, as well as old footage on the nationwide mourning of Bruce's death. Bruce's grave is visited by Linda and Bruce's friends. A voice narrates how Bruce Lee greatly influenced the world's view on the Chinese and their Kung Fu, along with his contributions to Kung Fu films. The episode ends with a faint voice whispering, "Shh... don't wake him."

== International syndications ==
- Iran: "Afsäneye Bruce Lee" began airing five times on IRIB TV2 in 2012, IRIB Tamasha channel in 2013, IRIB Omid channel in 2017, and again in 2018,2019 and 2024 on IRIB Tamasha. These are without considering several daily repeats of every episode on TamashaTV.
- Brazil: "Bruce Lee – A Lenda" began airing on Rede CNT on May 2, 2011. Band reaired the series on September 19, 2020, inserting appearances of Jacqueline Sato as a show host before and after commercial breaks.
- Italy: "La Leggenda di Bruce Lee" began airing on RAI 4 from April 4.
- United States: began airing on KTSF on weeknights at 9:00 pm from April 2009.
- Vietnam: aired on HTV2 and DN1-RTV with a translated name Huyền thoại Lý Tiểu Long in 2009.
- South Korea: 이소룡 전기 began airing on SBS from May 2009.
- Japan: ブルース・リー伝説 began airing on BS NTV from October 3, 2009. It was released on DVD by VAP in 2010.
- Canada: The Legend of Bruce Lee began airing on Fairchild Television on March 15, 2010.
- Hong Kong: began airing on ATV Home on May 14, 2010, but with episodes trimmed from 45 minutes to just 30 minutes. The first four episodes included interviews with Danny Chan at the start of each episode. Also, the opening theme was replaced by the ending theme and vice versa.
- Philippines: Begin airing on Q on June 28, 2010, replacing Idol World: Super Junior.
- Taiwan: Begin airing on TTV on September 27, 2010.
- Venezuela: "La Leyenda de Bruce Lee" began airing on Televen on October 15, 2012
- Netflix in the UK. All 50 episodes are on Netflix in the UK
- Indonesia: The Legend of Bruce Lee airs on Hi Indo in 2018.

Also, in the United States, Lions Gate Entertainment edited the series into a 183 minute long film and released it on DVD on September 21, 2010.

== Cast ==
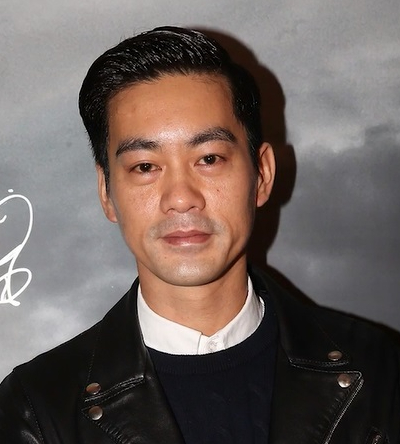
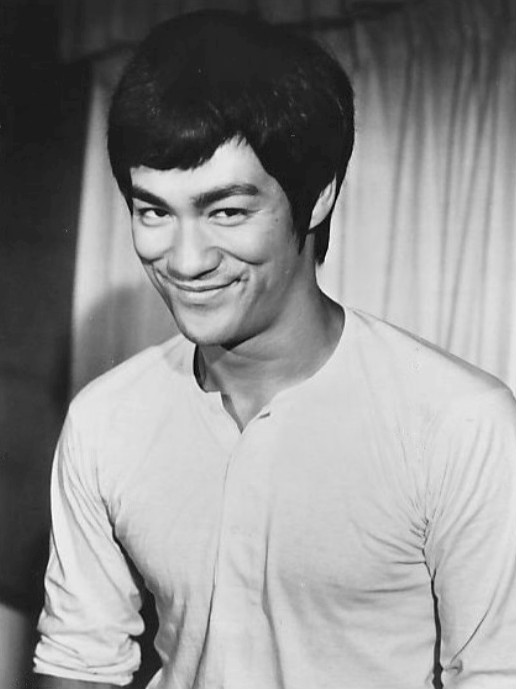
Danny Chan, who portrayed Bruce Lee in the series.

Cast	Role
Danny Chan	Bruce Lee 李小龍
Michelle Lang	Linda Lee 琳達.埃莫瑞
Giulio Taccon	Brandon Lee 李國豪
Ray Park	Rolex 勞力士(Chuck Norris and Robert Wall)
Michael Jai White	Harrison (Muhammad Ali)哈里森
Gary Daniels	Elliott 埃里特
Mark Dacascos	King Charles 察爾王
Tim Storms	Wally Jay (Wally Jay and Gene LeBell) 威利.傑依
Yannick Van Dam	Hoffman (Joe Lewis and Chuck Norris) 霍夫曼
Yu Chenghui	Master Ye (Ip Man) 葉問
Wang Luoyong	Shao Ruhai (James Yimm Lee and Siu Hon Sang) 邵如海
Gai Ke	Grace Ho 何愛瑜
Zhou Zhou	Li Haiquan (Lee Hoi-chuen) 李海泉
Xiaoxiao Bian	Qin Xiaoman (Maria Yi, Nora Miao and Betty Ting) 秦小曼
Hazen Lake MacIntyre	George (Stirling Silliphant) 喬治
Ted E. Duran	Blair (Charlie Owen and  James DeMile)布萊爾
Natalia Dzyublo	Jones 瓊斯
Traci Ann Wolfe	Julianna 嘉麗雅娜
He Kuan	Piao Zhengyi (Park Chang-yi) (Jhoon Rhee) 朴正义
Eric Chen	Wong Shun Leung 黃淳梁
Liu Dong	(Taky) Kimura 木村武之
Ning Li	Dan Inosanto 伊諾山度
Gao Daowei	Xu Wenhuai (Raymond Chow) 許文懷
Zhang Lu	Huang Li (Lo Wei) 黃黎
Jia Meiying	Xu Diya (Ruby Chow) 徐迪雅
Lin Yumiao	Ah Lin; Unicorn Chan 阿林
Luc Bendza	Jesse Glover 傑西.格魯夫
Ernest Miller	Earnie Shavers 費雷澤
Leslie H. Collins	William Dozier 威廉
Wang Gongyi	Peter Lee 李忠琛
Cheng Yu	Wang Lichao 王力朝
Yang Yaxing	Arroyo (Amy Sanbo)
Li Yuan now known as Bing-yuan Li	Yellow-skinned Brat (Wong Jack Man) 黃皮小子
