= Bruce Lee: The Curse of the Dragon =

- Film poster
- Directed by: Fred Weintraub; Tom Khun
- Written by: Davis Miller
- Produced by: Tom Khun; Fred Weintraub
- Starring: Bruce Lee; Jackie Chan; Brandon Lee; Linda Lee Cadwell
- Narrated by: George Takei
- Cinematography: John Axelson
- Edited by: David Klandrud
- Music by: David Wheatley; Fred Wintraub
- Distributed by: Warner Bros.
- Release date: 1993
- Running time: 90 minutes
- Country: United States
- Language: English

Bruce Lee: The Curse of the Dragon is a 1993 American documentary film about Bruce Lee. The film includes interviews from his students, friends, actors and others who worked alongside him. The film is directed by Tom Kuhn and Fred Weintraub, who produced Enter the Dragon, and is written by Davis Miller, the bestselling author of the books The Tao of Muhammad Ali, The Tao of Bruce Lee and Approaching Ali.

== Interviews ==
Curse of the Dragon contains interviews from the following people:

- Chuck Norris, who trained with Lee and starred in Way of the Dragon as Lee's final opponent.
- Dan Inosanto, a student of Bruce Lee who appeared in Game of Death as an opponent of Lee.
- Kareem Abdul-Jabbar, a professional basketball player and student of Lee who also appeared in Game of Death as Lee's final opponent.
- Robert Wall, a student of Chuck Norris who became friends with Lee after meeting him at a Kung-Fu demonstration in San Francisco.
- Robert Baker, who starred as Lee's final opponent in Fist of Fury. Baker was a student of Lee's.
- Taky Kimura, a student of Lee who was slated to play the second floor guardian in Game of Death. The scene was never shot.
- Brandon Lee, the son of Lee, who would die only a year later while filming The Crow.
- Linda Lee Cadwell, the wife of Bruce Lee.

== Release ==
In 2000, Bruce Lee: A Warrior's Journey was released, containing lost footage of Lee's Game of Death. DVDs of Curse of the Dragon were released with A Warrior's Journey as a bonus disc after its release. A Warrior's Journey may also be found as a bonus disc on the 2004 special edition of Enter the Dragon.

== See also ==
- Bruce Lee filmography
- Bruce Lee: The Man and the Legend
- Bruce Lee: The Legend
- The Legend of Bruce Lee
- Bruce Lee: In His Own Words
- Death by Misadventure
- The Path of the Dragon
- The Intercepting Fist
- Martial Arts Maser
- The Unbeatable Bruce Lee
- Bruce Lee: The Man, The Myth
- Bruce Lee, My Brother
