= Giulio Taccon =

Italian-Chinese musician and actor (born 2002)

Giulio Taccon (Chinese: 朱刘; pinyin: Zhu Liu) (born November 6, 2002) is an Italian-Chinese musician and actor, born in the city of Taiyuan, Shanxi province, Northern China. He started learning piano in Italy at the age of 6.

Giulio Taccon played Brandon Lee in the 50th episode of the TV series The Legend of Bruce Lee, which was aired on and produced by CCTV in 2006. Giulio was born from an Italian father and Chinese mother.

Giulio graduated in piano at the Gaetano Donizetti music conservatory of Bergamo on 2025.
