= Taky Kimura =

Martial Arts Instructor (1924–2021)

- Born: Takauki Kimura; March 12, 1924; Clallam Bay, Washington, U.S.
- Died: January 7, 2021 (aged 96); Woodinville, Washington, U.S.
- Native name: ターキー木村
- Nationality: American
- Style: Jun Fan Gung Fu; Judo
- Teacher: Bruce Lee

Other information
- Children: 1

Takauki "Taky" Kimura (Japanese: 木村 武之, March 12, 1924 – January 7, 2021) was an American martial artist who is famous as being one of Bruce Lee's top students and closest friends - and a certified instructor in Jun Fan Gung Fu, personally certified by Bruce Lee himself. Kimura was also the best man at Lee's wedding, and one of six pallbearers during his funeral, the others including Dan Inosanto, Steve McQueen, James Coburn, Peter Chin and Robert Lee, Bruce's brother.

== Early life ==
Kimura was born in Clallam Bay, Washington, United States, on March 12, 1924.

== Internment ==
Kimura and his family were interned in a War relocation center (or internment camp) during World War II following the signing of Executive Order 9066, first at Tule Lake and later at Minidoka, due to their Japanese ethnicity. Kimura was actually taken to the camp one day before his high school graduation.

Emerging from the internment camp after World War II, Kimura found himself to be downtrodden, broken down and lacking motivation. Because he was unable to graduate from high school due to being taken to the internment camp, and because his family had no money to pay for his college education, his family began to operate a supermarket store in Seattle, Washington.

== Bruce Lee and martial arts ==
Kimura first learned judo from a fellow internee during World War II.

In his mid-thirties, during the year 1959, Kimura met a young, rising 18-year-old martial arts genius named Bruce Lee. Even before Lee opened his first Jun Fan Gung Fu institute in 1960, Kimura was a part of his first students in the US, among them Jesse Glover, James DeMile, Ed Hart, Skipp Ellsworth and LeRoy Garcia. Kimura then joined Bruce's early kung-fu club where Lee taught Jun Fan Gung Fu, literally translating to Bruce Lee's Kung Fu and his version of Wing Chun, Kimura became Lee's student, assistant and at that time, his "best friend." Together, they practiced, sparred, trained, and then founded Lee's first kung fu club (the Lee Jun Fan Gung Fu Institute) renting a small basement room with a half door entry from 8th Street in Seattle's Chinatown, where he became Lee's first Assistant Instructor.

Kimura was also the best man to Bruce Lee at Bruce's wedding to Linda Emery. Kimura was one of only three individuals to be personally certified by Lee to teach his martial arts, which include Jun Fan Gung Fu and Jeet Kune Do. The other two are Dan Inosanto and James Yimm Lee (no relation to Bruce Lee).

After Bruce Lee's death on July 20, 1973, Kimura was also one of six pallbearers at his funeral, the other five being: Dan Inosanto, Steve McQueen, James Coburn, Peter Chin and Robert Lee, Bruce's brother.

Kimura held a 7th rank in Jun Fan Gung Fu. After Kimura was certified, he was allowed to teach small classes under the mantra of "keep the numbers low, but the quality high".

== Appearances in films and documentaries ==
Kimura appears as himself in a number of documentaries, including Mellissa Tong's Taky Kimura: The Dragon's Legacy (2000), which was produced by Quentin Lee.

Documentaries Kimura appears in also include: How Bruce Lee Changed the World (2009), Bruce Lee in G.O.D.: Shibôteki yûgi (2000), Bruce Lee: A Warrior's Journey (2000), The Path of the Dragon (1998) (short documentary), The Life of Bruce Lee (1994), The Curse of the Dragon (1993), Bruce Lee, the Legend (1977) and Bruce Lee: The Man and the Legend (1973).

TV shows he has appeared in include a 1994 episode of Biography entitled Bruce Lee: The Immortal Dragon and a 1999 episode of Famous Families entitled "The Lees: Action Speaks Louder".

== Later years ==
Known persons that Kimura has certified as instructors in Jun Fan Gung Fu are; Andy Kimura (his son) and students; Scott Lindenmuth, and Tsuyoshi Abe. Andy Kimura still teach Jun Fan Gung-Fu in the Seattle area.

In 2009, nearly 67 years after his original, scheduled graduation date, at age 85, Kimura finally was allowed to receive his diploma from Clallam Bay High School in Clallam Bay, Washington, and was the high school's salutatorian (the second highest graduate of the entire graduating class). Kimura grew up with his family in the state of Washington. Taky Kimura celebrated his 90th birthday in 2014.

Kimura died at his home at the age of 96.
