= James DeMile =

American martial artist (1935–2021)

- Born: 6 June 1935; San Francisco
- Died: 15 August 2021 (aged 86)
- Style: Wing Chun Do Gung-Fu; Boxing
- Teacher: Bruce Lee

James W. DeMile (6 June 1935 – 15 August 2021) was an American martial artist, hypnotherapist and author. He was among the first group of students of Bruce Lee, whom he met in 1959, as they both attended Edison Technical School. In 1963, DeMile appeared in Lee's only book, The Philosophical Art of Self Defense. He was an inductee in the AMAA Who's Who in the Martial Arts Hall of Fame and Black Belt Magazine Hall of Fame.

== Early life ==
DeMile was of mixed race ancestry. He reportedly experienced a difficult childhood in an orphanage, with a history of teenage gang fights and petty crimes.

== Training with Bruce Lee ==
In 1959, a year after arriving in America, Bruce Lee decided to share his martial arts knowledge. What started as informal sparring sessions between friends turned into a three-school business that cemented Bruce's pioneering approach to the art of hand-in-hand fighting.

After serving in the U.S. Air Force, DeMile (aged 25) met Bruce Lee (aged 18) at Edison Technical School in Seattle. Bruce had given a demonstration of gung fu. After Bruce came down from the stage, DeMile approached Lee and spoke skeptically of gung fu - having a background in street fighting as well as being an undefeated boxer while in the air force. Lee was only 5'7" tall and weighed about 135 pounds to DeMile's 5' 9.5" and 225 pounds . Nevertheless, Lee invited DeMile to throw a punch at him. DeMile did - and quickly found that Lee had his hands totally trapped. Impressed, DeMile soon joined Lee's informal gung fu class.

The group practiced in different rooms in Edison Tech or various places around Seattle, such as the parking garage near Ruby Chow's restaurant where Lee worked. It was DeMile who introduced Lee to one of the three men he would later certify as an instructor, 38-year-old Taky Kimura.

In the book Disciples of the Dragon, DeMile stated that they were all dummies for Lee's training. One of the reasons Lee modified his Wing Chun techniques and created Jeet Kune Do, was because the westerners were bigger and stronger than he was and once they would learn the basics of Wing Chun, they could become a real threat to him.

== Martial arts achievements ==
James DeMile was the creator of Wing Chun Do, a modified version of Wing Chun. Virgin Australia Airlines Airlines contracted DeMile to create a program to train its in-flight cabin and ground crew staff with the tactics to disarm and immobilize a threatening passenger or terrorist. DeMile has trained United States Secret Service operatives, FBI agents, Federal marshals and police officers specializing in riots.

== Bibliography ==
- Tao of Wing Chun Do, Bruce Lee's Chi Sao
- Tao of Wing Chun Do: Mind and Body in Harmony
- Bruce Lee's 1 and 3 Inch Power Punch

== Filmography ==
Year	Title	Role	Notes
1967	The Last Adventure	N/A	The Last Adventure at IMDb
1993	Bruce Lee: The Curse of the Dragon	Himself	The Curse of the Dragon at IMDb
