= Wong Jack-man =

Chinese martial artist and martial arts teacher

- Born: 1941; British Hong Kong
- Died: December 26, 2018 (aged 76–77); California, U.S
- Native name: 黃澤民
- Nationality: Chinese
- Style: Chinese martial arts: Tai chi; Xingyiquan; Northern Shaolin
- Rank: Grandmaster
- Years active: 1960–2005

Other information
- Occupation: Martial artist

Chinese name
- Chinese: 黃澤民
- Jyutping: wong4 zaak6-man4
Transcriptions
Standard Mandarin
- Hanyu Pinyin: Huáng Zémín
Yue: Cantonese
- Jyutping: wong4 zaak6-man4

Wong Jack-man (born 1941 – December 26, 2018) was a Chinese martial artist and teacher. He was best known for his controversial duel with Bruce Lee in 1964.

== Early life ==
Born in 1941 in Hong Kong, Wong was a master of Taijiquan, Xingyiquan and Northern Shaolin.

== Fight with Bruce Lee ==
Accounts of Wong's fight with Lee are contrary and controversial, as it was unrecorded and held privately at Chinatown, Oakland in 1964, when both men were in their early 20s.

According to Linda Lee Cadwell, Bruce Lee's wife, Lee's teaching of Chinese martial arts to white people made him unpopular with Chinese martial artists in San Francisco. Wong contested the notion that Lee was fighting for the right to teach whites as most of his students were Chinese. According to Sifu Scott Jensen, a white student Wong taught, the fight was not provoked by Lee's education of Caucasians, but to "pay a penance for nearly killing a man in an exhibition fight back in China."

Wong stated that he requested a public fight with Lee after Lee had issued an open challenge during a demonstration at a Chinatown theater in which he claimed to be able to defeat any martial artist in San Francisco. Wong stated it was after a mutual acquaintance delivered a note from Lee inviting him to fight that he showed up at Lee's school to challenge him.

According to author Norman Borine, Wong wanted to know the rules of the match and the restrictions on techniques such as hitting the face, groin kicks, and eye jabs, and that the two fought no holds barred after he received no reply from Lee.

The details of the fight vary depending on the account. Individuals known to have witnessed the match included Cadwell, James Lee (an associate of Bruce Lee, no relation) and William Chen, a teacher of tai chi. According to Linda, the fight lasted three minutes with a decisive victory for Bruce.

Lee gave a description, without naming Wong explicitly, in an interview with Black Belt.

I'd gotten into a fight in San Francisco with a Kung-Fu cat, and after a brief encounter the son-of-a-bitch started to run. I chased him and, like a fool, kept punching him behind his head and back. Soon my fists began to swell from hitting his hard head. Right then I realized Wing Chun was not too practical and began to alter my way of fighting.

Cadwell recounted the scene in her book Bruce Lee: The Man Only I Knew (1975):

The two came out, bowed formally and then began to fight. Wong adopted a classic stance whereas Bruce, who at the time was still using his Wing Chun style, produced a series of straight punches. Within a minute, Wong's men were trying to stop the fight as Bruce began to warm to his task. James Lee warned them to let the fight continue. A minute later, with Bruce continuing the attack in earnest, Wong began to backpedal as fast as he could. For an instant, indeed, the scrap threatened to degenerate into a farce as Wong actually turned and ran. But Bruce pounced on him like a springing leopard and brought him to the floor where he began pounding him into a state of demoralization. "Is that enough?" shouted Bruce, "That's enough!" pleaded his adversary. Bruce demanded a second reply to his question to make sure that he understood this was the end of the fight.

This is in contrast to Wong and William Chen's account of the fight, as they state the fight lasted an unusually long 20–25 minutes. Wong disputed Lee's version of events and published his own account in the Chinese Pacific Weekly, a Chinese language newspaper in San Francisco.

According to Wong's published account, the fight began at approximately 6:05 when Lee asked him to step forward in the middle of the school. Wong stated that he had extended "a hand of friendship" in accordance with martial arts traditions, but Lee initiated the attack. Wong maintained that neither combatant fell to the ground during the encounter, though both fighters were "swayed" and "grazed" their opponent. He specifically denied claims that Lee had knocked him back against a wall or forced him to plead for "mercy."

However, a significantly different account was provided by David Chin, who had arranged the match on Wong's behalf. According to Chin's interview with Matthew Polly, Lee overwhelmed Wong with his opening series of attacks as Wong was approaching for the customary salute, causing Wong to turn his back and run. Chin stated that Lee chased Wong around the room until Wong tripped and fell, after which Lee jumped on top of Wong and rained down punches, forcing Chin to intervene and rescue Wong.

The Chinese Pacific Weekly article, which featured Wong's version on the front page, concluded with Wong declaring he would not argue his case further in newspapers. Instead, he offered that if challenged to fight again, he would hold a public exhibition so that "everyone can see with their own eyes." Lee made no public response to Wong's article and closed his Oakland school shortly thereafter, relocating to Los Angeles where he would later achieve fame in Hollywood.

Wong later expressed regret over fighting Lee, attributing it to arrogance, both on the part of Lee and himself.

== Later life and death ==
Wong instructed classes in California at the Fort Mason Center in San Francisco and at the First Unitarian Church in Oakland for the better part of five decades before retiring in 2005. Wong's top two students continue his legacy of teaching. In San Francisco, Rick Wing who took over his teacher's school after his retirement in December 2005 teaches classes at a private location. In San Rafael and San Anselmo in Marin County, California, Scott Jensen runs the 10,000 Victories School that teaches Wong Jack-man's martial arts. In Oakland, California, The EBM Kung Fu Academy teaches Wong's lineage.

Wong died in California on December 26, 2018.

== See also ==
- Birth of the Dragon
