= James Yimm Lee =

American martial artist

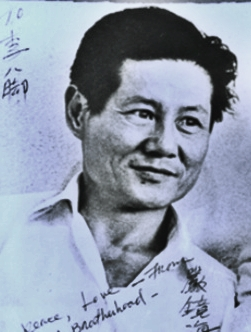
- Instructor of chinese martial arts
- Born: January 31, 1920; Oakland, California
- Died: December 30, 1972 (aged 52); Hayward, California; Lung cancer
- Native name: 嚴鏡海
- Style: Wing Chun; Jun Fan Gung Fu; Iron Palm; Jop Sil; Boxing
- Teachers: T.Y. Wong; Bruce Lee
- Rank: 3

Other information
- Occupation: martial artist, welder, US Army veteran
- Spouse: Katherine Chow (m. 1951; died 1964)
- Children: Karena Lee (daughter); Greglon Lee (son)
- Notable students: Robert Baker; Howard Williams; Gene Snelling; Al Novak; Gary Dill

Chinese name
- Traditional Chinese: 嚴鏡海
- Simplified Chinese: 严镜海
Transcriptions
Standard Mandarin
- Hanyu Pinyin: Yán Jìnghǎi

James Yimm Lee (January 31, 1920 – December 30, 1972) was an American martial arts pioneer, teacher, author, and publisher. James Lee is known for being a mentor, teacher and friend of Bruce Lee.

== Early life ==
Lee was born on January 31, 1920, in Oakland, California. He was a welder by profession. He joined the United States Army in August 1944. After basic training, he was stationed at Fort Knox, Kentucky for radio operator school. In January 1945, he was deployed to the Philippine Islands for about a year while a part of the 716th Tank Battalion and fought in the Battle of Luzon and Battle of Mindanao campaigns. In January 1946, he was sent to the Letterman Army Hospital, San Francisco, California due to recurring bouts of malaria. He became a private first class and was assigned to the 801st Military Police Battalion in San Francisco, California.

== Career ==
He was one of Bruce Lee's (no relation) three personally certified 3rd rank instructors and co-founded the Jun Fan Gung Fu Institute in Oakland where he taught Jun Fan Gung Fu in Bruce's absence. James was responsible for introducing Bruce Lee to Ed Parker, the organizer of the Long Beach International Karate Championships where Bruce was first introduced to the martial arts community.

James Lee became well known for his Iron Palm specialty, and would routinely break bricks at demonstrations. He was the first to publish an Iron Palm book in America in 1957.

He and Linda Lee were eyewitnesses of the fight between Bruce Lee and Wong Jack-man held privately in Chinatown, Oakland in 1964.

== Books ==
Lee was a well-established author and was one of the first to publish martial arts books in English in America. He also helped Bruce Lee publish his first book, "Chinese Gung-Fu: The Philosophical Art of Self Defense." James Lee's published books include: Modern Kung-Fu Karate: Iron Poison Hand Training, Book 1 (Break Brick in 100 Days), Wing Chun Kung-Fu, and Secret Fighting Arts of the Orient.

== Personal life ==
Lee married Katherine Margaret Chow on October 13, 1951, in Nevada; they had at least two children, a daughter, Karena Lee, and a son, Greglon Yimm Lee.

Jesse Glover was introduced to Chinese Kung Fu by James Lee during a trip before meeting Bruce Lee in 1959.

His wife, Katherine, died in 1964.

== Death ==
James Lee died aged 52 on 30 December 1972 due to lung cancer caused by welding fumes, only about 7 months before the death of Bruce Lee.

== See also ==
- Chinese Martial Arts
- Bruce Lee
- Oakland
- Jeet Kune Do
- Wing Chun
