= Ted Wong =

American Jeet Kune Do practitioner

- Born: November 5, 1937; Hong Kong
- Died: November 24, 2010 (aged 73)
- Style: Jeet Kune Do (Jun Fan Gung Fu)

Other information
- Occupation: Martial arts Instructor
- Spouse: Krina Wong

Ted Wong (November 5, 1937 – November 24, 2010) was a martial arts practitioner best known for studying under Bruce Lee.

== Early life ==
Wong was born in Hong Kong in 1937. His father, a native Californian of Chinese descent, was stationed there while serving in the US Navy. His family moved back to San Francisco, California, in 1953, and a few years later to San Diego. After completing high school and college, Wong served in the US Army as a lieutenant for 2 years in West Germany. After serving, he returned to San Diego in 1962.

== Martial arts ==
Wong's first encounter with Bruce Lee was in 1967, in Los Angeles, California, where Lee was giving a Kung Fu seminar. Wong had no martial arts training, and was interested in western boxing and some martial arts. He was so impressed by Lee, however, that he decided to study at Lee's kwoon, the Jun Fan Gung Fu Institute in Los Angeles. Shortly after beginning his studies, Lee accepted Wong as a private student. Wong became Lee's sparring partner and close friend.

Wong was present as Lee developed Jun Fan Gung Fu into Jeet Kune Do. He was present to see Lee train other martial artists, including Karate Champion Joe Lewis and basketball star Kareem Abdul-Jabbar. Wong was one of only a few people to receive rank in the art of Jeet Kune Do by Bruce Lee. Wong never learned another martial art besides what Lee had taught him, thus he never taught anything other than what he learned.

Wong gave seminars and continued to teach privately until his death. He co-authored several books about Jeet Kune Do. Some of his students included Bruce Lee’s daughter Shannon Lee. Wong was a lifetime board member of the Bruce Lee Foundation and the Jeet Kune Do Society.

Ted Wong had a core group of long-time students whom he certified as instructors, such as Lewis Luk, Albert Grajales, Sean R. Glynn, Bill Mattucci, Richard Torres, Mike Gittleson, and others around the world. In the Netherlands, James ter Beek and George Sirag. In Spain, Joaquín Marcelo. In Italy, Alberto Costanzo and Davide Gardella. These instructors are continuing to practice the JKD as taught by Ted Wong and Bruce Lee at their own locations.

Ted Wong was inducted into Black Belt magazine's Hall of Fame as the "Man of the Year" in 2006.

== Books co-authored by Wong ==
- Cheung, William; Ted Wong (1990). Wing Chun Kung Fu/Jeet Kune Do: a Comparison Volume 1. Black Belt Communications. p. 192. ISBN 978-0-89750-124-8.
- Tom, Teri; Ted Wong (2006). The Straight Lead: The Core of Bruce Lee's Jun Fan Jeet Kune Do. Tuttle Publishing. p. 256. ISBN 978-0-8048-3630-2.
