= Long Beach International Karate Championships =

Martial arts tournament

Competition details
- Discipline: Karate
- Type: Kumite, biennial

History
- First edition: August 1964 in Long Beach, California, United States

The Long Beach International Karate Championships is an International karate and martial arts tournament in Long Beach, California, at the Long Beach Municipal Auditorium, and was first held in August 1964 by Kenpo Grandmaster Ed Parker. The tournament ran competition until 1999 under IKKA organization/Parker family. Many great tournament fighters earned their stripes at this tournament, including Chuck Norris, Andy Ah Po, Tony Martinez Sr., Mike Stone, Joe Lewis, Jim Kelly, Benny "The Jet" Urquidez, Billy Blanks, Jerry Piddington, and "Superfoot" Bill Wallace. The Long Beach Internationals is also where Bruce Lee was first introduced to the martial arts community in August 1964, with Lee making another appearance in 1967.

== 1964 ==
In 1964, Bruce Lee appeared at the inaugural tournament and demonstrated his one-inch punch and two-finger push-ups. His volunteer was Robert "Bob" Baker of Stockton, California, who was Lee's student and became the lead villain in Fist of Fury. "I told Bruce not to do this type of demonstration again", he recalled. "When he punched me that last time, I had to stay home from work because the pain in my chest was unbearable." The only existing, high quality footage of Bruce Lee's 1964 Wing Chun demonstration was filmed with a 16mm camera. The sole proprietor of this 8.5-minute-long video is a California-based company, Rising Sun Productions. The owner of this company and reported discoverer of this video is Don Warrener. Poorer quality generations of this footage can be viewed on the Internet.

== 1967 ==
Bruce Lee made another appearance at Ed Parker's 1967 U'S. Internationals Karate tournament in Long Beach, California. The 1967 video footage has been preserved at a higher quality than the earlier 1964 footage. He demonstrates his fast speed, launching quick eye strikes before his opponent can block. Lee then performs chi sau while blindfolded, probing for weaknesses in his opponent while scoring with punches and takedowns. He then performs the one-inch punch on several volunteers. Most notably, Lee then participates in a sparring demonstration against sparring partners Taky Kimura and Dan Inosanto with Inosanto first and Kimura second. Lee, Kimura and Inosanto were all wearing leather headgear and full body gear. Lee can be seen implementing his Jeet Kune Do concept of economical motion, using Muhammad Ali inspired footwork to keep out of range while counter-attacking with backfists and straight punches. He demonstrated and successfully proved the Jeet Kune Do concept of the lead hand being used as a probe to gauge the fight situation. He also halts his opponent's attacks with stop-hit side kicks and quickly executes several sweeps and head kicks. The opponent is never able to connect with a clean hit, but once manages to come close with a spin kick. The fight footage was reviewed by Black Belt magazine in 1995, concluding that "the action is as fast and furious as anything in Lee's films."

== See also ==
- Bruce Lee
- Jeet Kune Do
