= Matthew Polly =

American author (born 1971)

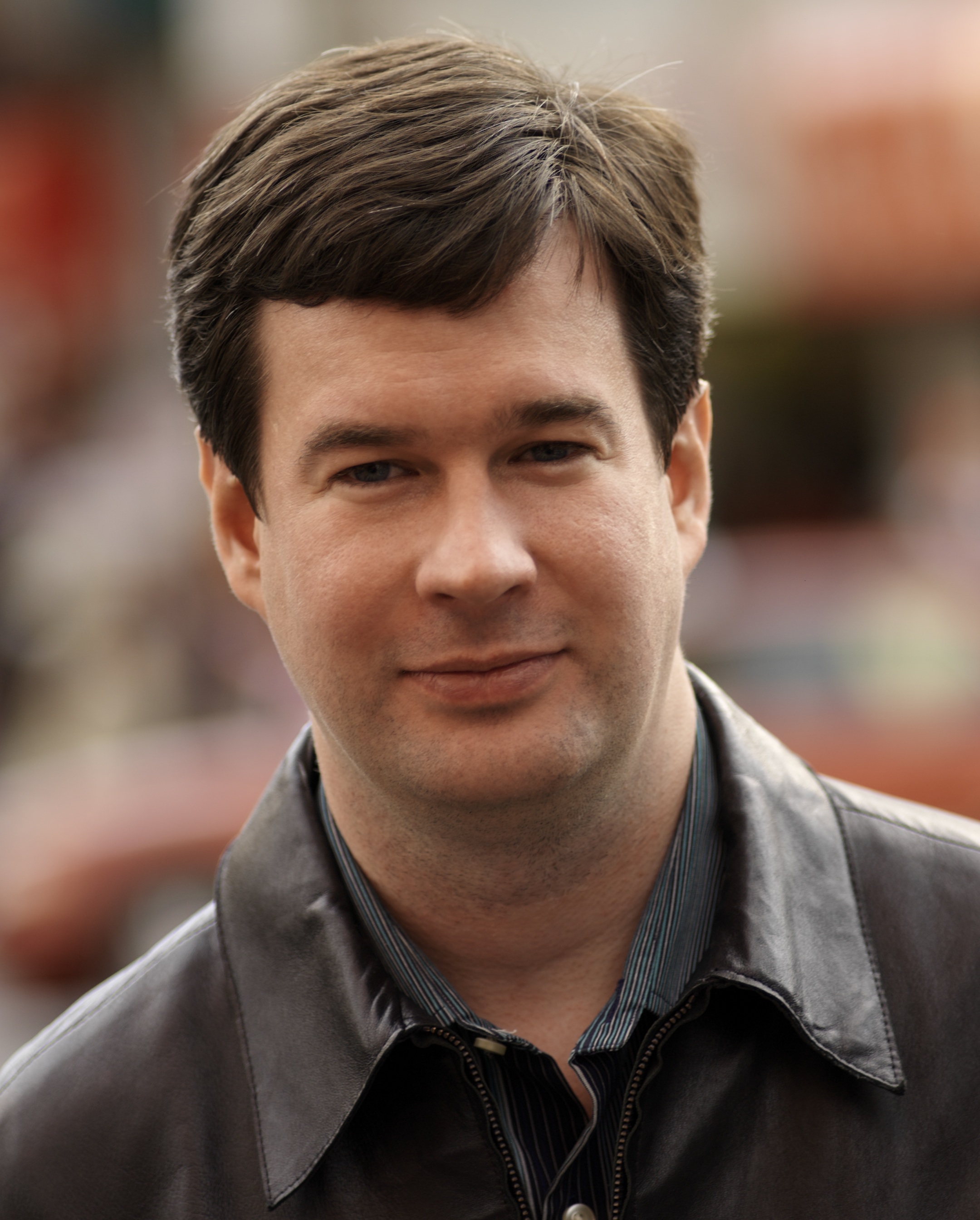
- Polly in 2004
- Born: Matthew Edward Polly; May 5, 1971; Topeka, Kansas, United States
- Education: Princeton University
- Occupation: Author
- Writing career
- Genre: Nonfiction
- Notable works: American Shaolin (book); Tapped Out (book); Bruce Lee: A Life (book)
- Notable awards: Lowell Thomas Award
- Website: mattpolly.com

Matthew Polly is an American author and former martial artist who writes about martial arts. His books include American Shaolin, Tapped Out, and Bruce Lee: A Life.

== Career ==
Polly graduated from Topeka West High School. In 1992, at the age of 21 years, Polly took a leave of absence from Princeton University and traveled to China to train at the Shaolin Temple, the birthplace of Chan (Zen) Buddhism and kung fu. Feng Yingbiao of Master Insight wrote that Polly's training at the Shaolin Temple was merely a crash course designed to lure laowai, attendance of which does not lead to expertise in Chinese culture.

In exchange for $1,300 a month Polly was allowed to stay and train with the monks. He spent two years at the temple and became the first American accepted as a Shaolin disciple. His experiences included training seven hours a day six days a week, involving running, breathing exercises, calisthenics, kung fu and gymnastics. He became a formidable kickboxer, and won a challenge match against a kung fu master from another province. He also became an "iron forearm" expert, where his arm became impervious to pain by calluses formed by bashing his arm against a tree for 30 minutes per day.

April 13, 2005, he appeared as a guest on The Late Late Show with Craig Ferguson.

== Written works ==
In 2003, Polly wrote a series of travel articles about his experiences in China for the online magazine Slate.com, "Return to the Shaolin Temple", and again in 2004 with a series on Monroe Elementary School in Topeka, Kansas.

=== American Shaolin ===
American Shaolin: Flying Kicks, Buddhist Monks, and the Legend of Iron Crotch: An Odyssey in the New China was published in 2007 by Gotham in the United States and Abacus in the United Kingdom. In the book, Polly discusses his experiences in China living, studying, and performing with Shaolin monks.

The book received several accolades:

- 2008 - Best Books for Young Adults, a designation from the American Library Association (ALA) for ten books from each year that "exemplify the quality and range of literature being published for teens"
- 2008 - Alex Award, an award given by the ALA to ten adult books with teen appeal
- 2009 - Outstanding Books for the College Bound and Lifelong Learners, which provides recommendations "to students of all ages to continue their education beyond high school"
- 2012 - Popular Paperbacks for Young Adults, a designation from the ALA that presents popular books widely available in paperback, representing a variety of accessible themes and genres

=== Tapped Out ===
Tapped Out: Rear Naked Chokes, the Octagon, and the Last Emperor : an Odyssey in Mixed Martial Arts was published in 2012 by Gotham Books. The book follows Polly's experience as a middle-aged amateur Mixed Martial Arts (MMA) fighter.

=== Bruce Lee: A Life ===
Bruce Lee: A Life was published in 2019 by Simon & Schuster and is a biography of Bruce Lee's life. It is the result of years of research, with interviews with over a hundred people, including Bruce Lee's wife and daughter.

The New York Times named the book as the actor and martial artist's "definitive" biography. Publishers Weekly said the book was "thorough [and] well-sourced." IndieBound compiles a list of 24 favorable reviews, including the ones from CNN, Kirkus Reviews, Booklist, Associated Press, Library Journal, San Francisco Chronicle, The Seattle Times, Shelf Awareness, and biographers like Jonathan Eig, Jimmy McDonough, and Brian Jay Jones. Writing in Master-Insight, Feng Yingbiao criticized the book for promoting a "Eurocentric" worldview and a lack of fact-checking, particularly criticizing Polly's allegation in the book that Lee was of Jewish ancestry.

This book has been translated into Spanish by Dojo Ediciones, part of Editorial Océano de México. It received favorable reviews from CineNuevaTribuna.es (Spanish online cinema magazine) and TheObjective.com (Spanish online newspaper).
