= Bruce Lee =

Martial artist and actor (1940–1973)

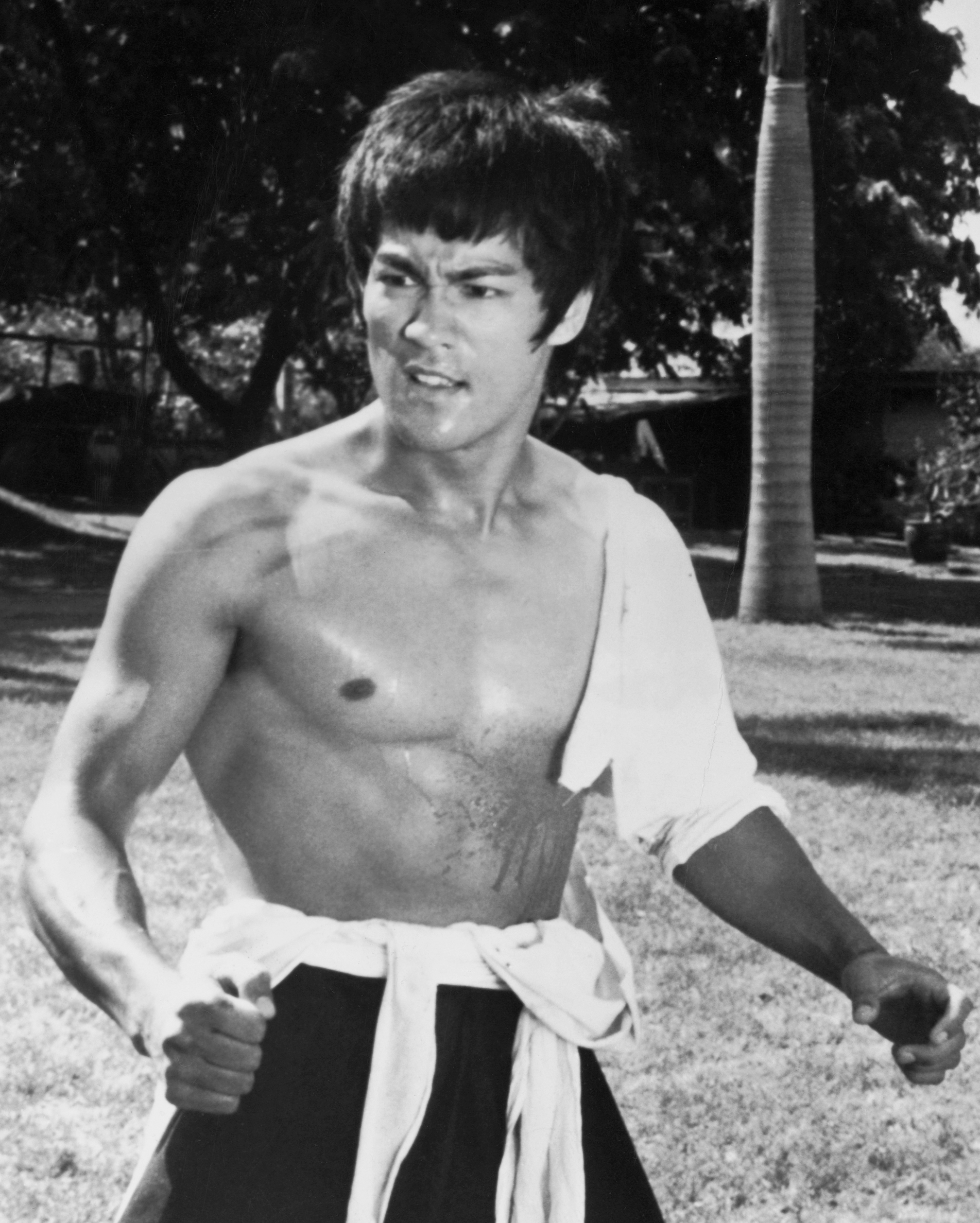
- Lee filming The Big Boss (1971)
- Born: Lee Jun-fan; November 27, 1940; San Francisco, California, U.S.
- Died: July 20, 1973 (aged 32); Kowloon, Hong Kong
- Resting place: Lake View Cemetery, Seattle, Washington, U.S.
- Other names: Lee Siu-lung; Lee Yuen-cham; Lee Yuen-kam
- Citizenship: British subject (Hong Kong); United States (Note: Although he was born in the United States, he did not claim his birthright U.S. citizenship until 1959.)
- Occupations: Martial artist; actor; philosopher; film director; screenwriter; producer
- Years active: 1941–1973
- Works: Filmography
- Height: 1.72 m (5 ft 7 1/2 in)
- Spouse: Linda Emery (m. 1964)
- Children: Brandon; Shannon
- Parents: Lee Hoi-chuen; Grace Ho
- Relatives: Peter Lee (brother); Robert Lee (brother)

Chinese name
- Traditional Chinese: 李小龍
- Simplified Chinese: 李小龙
- Jyutping: Lei5 Siu2 Lung4
- Literal meaning: Lee the Little Dragon
Transcriptions
Standard Mandarin
- Hanyu Pinyin: Lǐ Xiǎolóng
- Bopomofo: ㄌㄧˇ ㄒㄧㄠˇ ㄌㄨㄥˊ
- Wade–Giles: Li^{3} Hsiao^{3}-lung^{2}
- Tongyong Pinyin: Lǐ Siǎo-lóng
- IPA: [lǐ ɕjàʊ.lʊ̌ŋ]
Yue: Cantonese
- Jyutping: Lei5 Siu2 Lung4
- IPA: [lej˩˧ siw˧˥ lʊŋ˩]

Lee Jun-fan
- Chinese: 李振藩
- Jyutping: Lei5 Zan3 Faan4
Transcriptions
Standard Mandarin
- Hanyu Pinyin: Lǐ Zhènfān
- Bopomofo: ㄌㄧˇ ㄓㄣˋ ㄈㄢˊ
- Wade–Giles: Li^{3} Chen^{4}-fan^{1}
- Tongyong Pinyin: Lǐ Jhèn-fan
- IPA: [lì ʈʂə̂n.fán]
Yue: Cantonese
- Jyutping: Lei5 Zan3 Faan4
- IPA: [lej˩˧ tsɐn˧ fan˩]
- Website: Official website

Bruce Lee (Note: Chinese: 李小龍) (born Lee Jun-fan; (Note: Chinese: 李振藩) November 27, 1940 – July 20, 1973) was a Hong Kong and American martial artist, actor, filmmaker, and philosopher. He was the founder of Jeet Kune Do, a hybrid martial arts philosophy, which was formed from his experiences in unarmed fighting and self-defense—as well as eclectic, Zen Buddhist, and Taoist philosophies—as a new school of martial arts thought. With a career spanning Hong Kong and the United States, Lee is regarded as the first global Chinese film star and one of the most influential martial artists in the history of cinema. Known for the five feature-length martial arts films that he starred in as an adult, he is credited with helping to popularize martial arts films in the 1970s and promoting Hong Kong action cinema.

Born in San Francisco and raised in Hong Kong, Lee was introduced to the Hong Kong film industry as a child actor by his father, Lee Hoi-chuen. Lee's early martial arts experience included Wing Chun (trained under Ip Man), tai chi, boxing (winning a Hong Kong boxing tournament), and frequent street fighting (neighborhood and rooftop fights). He moved to Seattle in 1959, enrolling at the University of Washington in 1961. It was during this time that Lee began to consider making money by teaching martial arts, even though he aspired to have a career in acting. He opened his first martial arts school, operated out of his home in Seattle. After later adding a second school in Oakland, California, Lee once drew significant attention at the 1964 Long Beach International Karate Championships of California by making demonstrations and speaking. He subsequently moved to Los Angeles to teach, where his students included Chuck Norris, Sharon Tate, and Kareem Abdul-Jabbar.

Lee's roles in the United States, including Kato in the ABC action television series The Green Hornet (1966–1967), introduced him to American audiences. After returning to Hong Kong in 1971, he landed his first leading role in The Big Boss (1971), directed by Lo Wei. A year later, Lee starred in Fist of Fury (1972), in which he portrayed Chen Zhen, and The Way of the Dragon (1972), which he directed and wrote. Lee went on to star in the American-Hong Kong co-production Enter the Dragon (1973) and The Game of Death (1978). His Hong Kong- and Hollywood-produced films, all of which were commercially successful, elevated Hong Kong martial arts films to a new level of popularity and acclaim, sparking a surge of Western interest in Chinese martial arts. The direction and tone of Lee's films, including their fight choreography and diversification, dramatically influenced and changed martial arts and martial arts films worldwide. With his influence, kung fu films began to displace the wuxia film genre—fights were choreographed more realistically, fantasy elements were discarded for real-world conflicts, and the characterisation of the male lead went from simply being a chivalrous hero to one that embodied the notion of masculinity.

Lee's career was cut short by his sudden death at the age of 32 from brain edema, the causes of which remain a matter of dispute. Nevertheless, Lee's films remained popular, gained a large cult following, and became widely imitated and exploited. He became an iconic figure known throughout the world, particularly among the Chinese, based upon his portrayal of Cantonese culture in his films, and among Asian Americans for defying Asian stereotypes in the United States. Even after his death, Lee has continued to be a prominent influence on modern combat sports, including judo, karate, mixed martial arts, and boxing, as well as modern popular culture, including film, television, comics, animation, and video games. Time magazine named him one of the 100 most important people of the 20th century.

== Early life ==
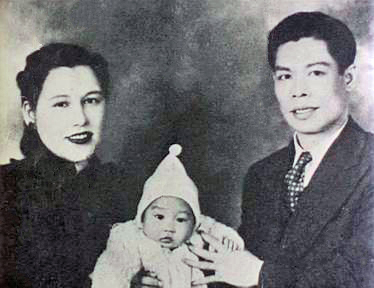
Lee as a baby with his parents, Grace Ho and Lee Hoi-chuen

Lee's birth name was Lee Jun-fan. His father, Lee Hoi-chuen, was a Cantonese opera singer based in Hong Kong. His mother, Grace Ho, was born in Shanghai, China. In December 1939, the couple traveled to California for an international opera tour in San Francisco's Chinatown neighborhood. Lee was born there on November 27, 1940. Due to the country's jus soli citizenship laws, his birth there allowed him to claim United States citizenship. When he was four months old (April 1941), the family returned to Hong Kong. Soon after, they experienced unexpected hardships as Japan, amid World War II, launched a surprise attack on Hong Kong in December 1941 and ruled the city for the next four years.

Grace's ethnicity is contested. The traditional opinion is that her father was a German immigrant, and that her mother was Chinese, as attested by biographers Robert Clouse and Bruce Thomas. Lee's wife, Linda Lee Cadwell, wrote that Grace's father was a German Catholic.

A new alternative theory argues that Grace's father was actually the son of a Dutch Jew, Charles Maurice Bosman, and his Chinese concubine. Charles Russo has questioned this origin story entirely, suggesting that Grace's father might have been Chinese or mixed-Chinese, and that her mother might have been English. Matthew Polly concedes that Grace's paternal grandfather was a Dutch Jew, but likewise asserts that her mother was English.

However, according to Doug Palmer, the claim that Grace had an English mother is only speculation. He also noted that, according to family records, the Dutch-Jewish Bosman family had originated from Germany, which may account for the assumption that Grace was part German.

== Career and education ==
=== 1940–1958: Early roles, schooling and martial arts initiation ===
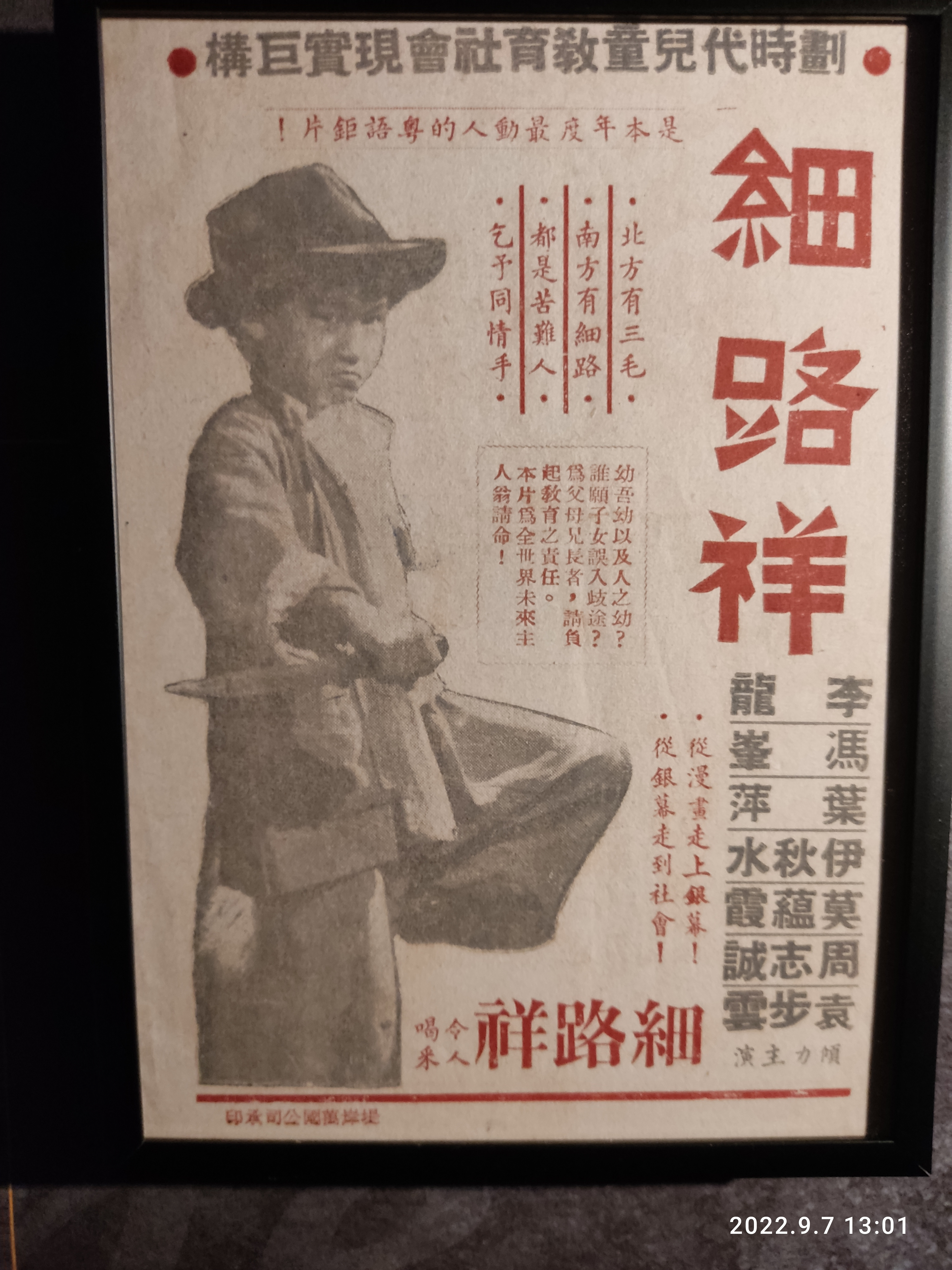
The Kid (1950) poster featuring 9-year-old Bruce Lee

Lee's father was a Cantonese opera star. As a result, Junior Lee was introduced to the world of cinema at a very young age and appeared in several films as a child. Lee had his first role as a baby who was carried onto the stage in the film Golden Gate Girl. He took his Chinese stage name as 李小龍, lit. "Lee the Little Dragon", for the fact that he was born in both the hour and the year of the Dragon by the Chinese zodiac.

At age seven, Lee began practicing tai chi together with his father. As a nine-year-old, he co-starred with his father in The Kid in 1950, which was based on a comic book character, "Kid Cheung", and was his first leading role. By the time he was 18, he had appeared in 20 films. After attending Tak Sun School (德信學校; several blocks from his home at 218 Nathan Road, Kowloon), Lee entered the primary school division of the Catholic La Salle College at age 12.

In the early 1950s, Lee's father became an opium addict. In 1956, due to poor academic performance (and possibly poor conduct), Lee was transferred to St. Francis Xavier's College. He was mentored by Brother Edward Muss, F.M.S., a Bavarian-born teacher and coach of the school boxing team.

In 1953, Lee's friend William Cheung introduced him to Ip Man. According to Cheung, Lee's European background on his mother's side led him to be rejected, initially, from learning Wing Chun kung fu under Ip Man because of the long-standing rule in the Chinese martial arts world not to teach foreigners. Cheung spoke on his behalf and Lee was accepted into the school and began training in Wing Chun with Ip Man. Ip tried to keep his students from fighting in the street gangs of Hong Kong by encouraging them to fight in organized competitions.

After a year of his training with Ip Man, most of the other students refused to train with Lee. They had learned of his mixed ancestry, and the Chinese were generally against teaching their martial arts techniques to non-Asians. Lee's sparring partner, Hawkins Cheung, states, "Probably fewer than six people in the whole Wing Chun clan were personally taught, or even partly taught, by Ip Man". However, Lee showed a keen interest in Wing Chun and continued to train privately with Ip Man, William Cheung, and Wong Shun-leung.

In 1958, Lee won the Hong Kong schools boxing tournament, knocking out the previous champion, Gary Elms, in the final. That year, Lee who was also a good cha-cha dancer, won Hong Kong's Crown Colony Cha-Cha Championship.

=== 1959–1964: Move to Seattle ===
In his late teens, Lee's street fights became more frequent and included beating the son of a feared triad family. In 1958, after students from a rival Choy Li Fut martial arts school challenged Lee's Wing Chun school, he engaged in a fight on a rooftop. In response to an unfair punch by another boy, he beat him so badly that one of his teeth was knocked out, leading to the boy's parents making a complaint to the police.

Lee's mother had to go to a police station and sign a document saying that she would take full responsibility for his actions if they released him into her custody. Though she did not mention the incident to her husband, she suggested that her son return to the United States to claim his U.S. citizenship at the age of 18. Lee's father agreed as Lee's college prospects were not very promising if he remained in Hong Kong.

The police detective came and said, "Excuse me, Mr. Lee, your son is really fighting bad in school. If he gets into just one more fight I might have to put him in jail".

— Robert Lee

In April 1959, Lee's parents decided to send him to the United States to stay with his older sister, Agnes Lee (李秋鳳), who was already living with family friends in San Francisco. After several months, he moved to Seattle in 1959 to continue his high school education, where he also worked for Ruby Chow as a live-in waiter at her restaurant. Chow's husband was a co-worker and friend of Lee's father. Lee's elder brother Peter Lee (李忠琛) joined him in Seattle for a short stay, before moving on to Minnesota to attend college.

In 1959, Lee started to teach martial arts. He called what he taught Jun Fan Gung Fu (literally Bruce Lee's Kung Fu). It was his approach to Wing Chun. Lee taught friends he met in Seattle, starting with Judo practitioner Jesse Glover, who continued to teach some of Lee's early techniques. Lee's early student group was the most racially diverse group of practitioners of Chinese martial arts until that time. During this time period, Lee invented his one-inch punch. He also became interested in boxing and the techniques of Muhammad Ali and Sugar Ray Robinson.

Taky Kimura became Lee's first assistant instructor and continued to teach his art and philosophy after Lee's death. Lee opened his first martial arts school, named the Lee Jun Fan Gung Fu Institute, in Seattle.

Lee completed his high school education and received his diploma from Edison Technical School on Capitol Hill in Seattle.

In March 1961, Lee enrolled at the University of Washington. Despite what Lee himself and many others have stated, Lee's official major was drama rather than philosophy, according to a 1999 article in the university's alumni publication. In his junior year, he took two classes in psychology and two classes in philosophy; both of these became core interests for him for the rest of his life. He socialized with wealthy young people, but lived in relative poverty and worked as a dishwasher in a Chinese restaurant.

=== 1964–1965: Oakland ===
Lee dropped out of university in early 1964 and moved to Oakland to live with James Yimm Lee. James Lee was twenty years senior to Lee and a well-known Chinese martial artist in the area. Together, they founded the second Jun Fan martial arts studio in Oakland. James Lee was responsible for introducing Lee to Ed Parker, an American martial artist. At the invitation of Parker, Lee appeared in the 1964 Long Beach International Karate Championships. He performed repetitions of two-finger push-ups, using the thumb and the index finger of one hand, with feet at approximately shoulder-width apart.

In the same Long Beach event, he also performed the "one-inch punch". Lee stood upright, his right foot forward with knees bent slightly, in front of a standing, stationary partner. Lee's right arm was partly extended and his right fist was approximately one inch (2.5 cm) away from the partner's chest. Without retracting his right arm, Lee then forcibly delivered the punch to volunteer Bob Baker while largely maintaining his posture. This sent Baker backward and falling into a chair placed behind Baker to prevent injury, though Baker's momentum caused him to fall to the floor. Baker recalled, "I told Bruce not to do this type of demonstration again. When he punched me that last time, I had to stay home from work because the pain in my chest was unbearable". It was at the 1964 championships that Lee first met Taekwondo master Jhoongoo Rhee. The two developed a friendship— a relationship from which they benefited as martial artists. Rhee taught Lee the side kick in detail, and Lee taught Rhee the "non-telegraphic" punch.

At the Long Beach event, he also publicly criticized a number of classical karate and kung fu styles and argued for modernizing martial arts. This was a highly controversial presentation that convinced some spectators, while offending others. Subsequently, he appeared at the Sun Sing Theatre to present his new approach to the Chinatown, Oakland, community. More traditional kung fu practitioners took Lee's claims as an open challenge.

In 1964, Lee had a controversial private match with Wong Jack-man. Jack-man was a direct student of Ma Kin Fung, known for his mastery of Xingyiquan, Northern Shaolin, and tai chi. According to Lee, the Chinese community issued an ultimatum to him to stop teaching non-Chinese people. When he refused to comply, he was challenged to a combat match with Wong. The arrangement was that if Lee lost, he would have to shut down his school, while if he won, he would be free to teach white people, or anyone else. Wong denied this, stating that he requested to fight Lee after Lee boasted during one of his demonstrations at a Chinatown theater that he could beat anyone in San Francisco, and that Wong himself did not discriminate against whites or other non-Chinese people. Lee commented, "That paper had all the names of the sifu from Chinatown, but they don't scare me". Individuals known to have witnessed the match include Cadwell, James Lee (Bruce Lee's associate, no relation), and William Chen, a teacher of tai chi.

Wong and William Chen stated that the fight lasted 20–25 minutes. Wong claims that although he had originally expected a serious but polite bout, Lee aggressively attacked him with the intent to kill. When Wong presented the traditional handshake, Lee appeared to accept the greeting, but instead, Lee allegedly thrust his hand as a spear aimed at Wong's eyes. Forced to defend his life, Wong asserted that he refrained from striking Lee with killing force when the opportunity presented itself because it could have earned him a prison sentence. According to a 1980 Michael Dorgan article in Official Karate magazine, the fight ended due to Lee's "unusually winded" condition, as opposed to a decisive blow by either fighter.

However, according to Bruce Lee, Linda Lee Cadwell, and James Yimm Lee, the fight lasted a mere three minutes with a decisive victory for Lee. In Cadwell's account, "The fight ensued, it was a no-holds-barred fight, it took three minutes. Bruce got this guy down to the ground and said 'Do you give up?' and the man said he gave up." A couple of weeks after the bout, Lee gave an interview claiming that he had defeated an unnamed challenger, which Wong says was an obvious reference to him.

In response, Wong published his account of the fight in the Pacific Weekly, a Chinese-language newspaper in San Francisco, with an invitation to a public rematch if Lee was not satisfied with the account. Lee did not respond to the invitation despite his reputation for violently responding to every provocation. There were no further public announcements by either, though Lee continued to teach non-Chinese people. Lee was unhappy with the outcome of the fight, and the experience led him to pursue further innovations in his personal style of martial arts.

Lee had abandoned thoughts of a film career in favor of pursuing martial arts. However, a martial arts exhibition in Long Beach in 1964 eventually led to the invitation by television producer William Dozier for an audition for a role in the pilot for "Number One Son" about Lee Chan, the son of Charlie Chan. The show never materialized, but Dozier saw potential in Lee.

=== 1966–1970: American roles and creating Jeet Kune Do ===
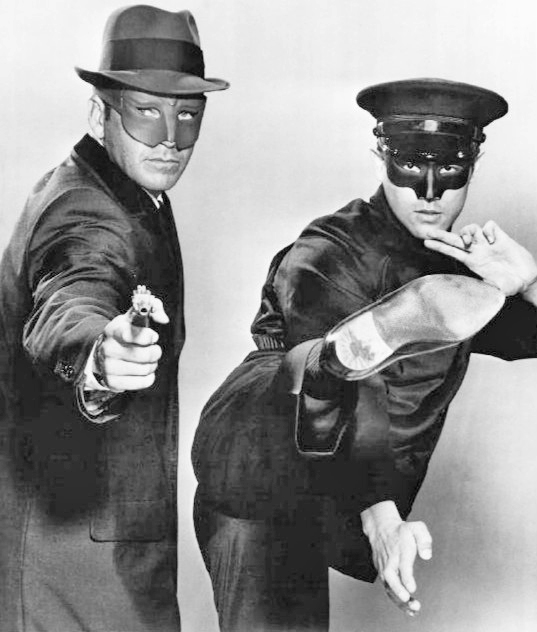
Publicity photograph of Williams (left) and Lee (right) for The Green Hornet in 1966

From 1966 to 1967, Lee played the role of Kato alongside the title character played by Van Williams in the TV series produced and narrated by William Dozier titled The Green Hornet, based on the radio show by the same name. The show ran for one season (26 episodes) from September 1966 to March 1967. Lee and Williams also appeared as their characters in three crossover episodes of Batman, another William Dozier-produced television series.

The Green Hornet introduced the adult Bruce Lee to an American audience and became the first popular American show presenting Asian-style martial arts. The show's director wanted Lee to fight in the typical American style using fists and punches. As a professional martial artist, Lee refused, insisting that he should fight in the style of his expertise. At first, Lee moved so fast that his movements could not be caught on film, so he had to slow them down. The American martial arts community promoted the TV show and viewed Lee as their first mainstream star.

During the show's production, Lee became friends with Gene LeBell, who worked as a stuntman in the show. The two trained together and exchanged martial arts knowledge from their respective specialties. After the show was canceled in 1967, Lee wrote to Dozier thanking him for starting "my career in show business".

The Jeet Kune Do emblem is a registered trademark held by the Bruce Lee Estate. The Chinese characters around the Taijitu symbol read: "Using no way as way" and "Having no limitation as limitation". The arrows represent the endless interaction between yang and yin.

After filming one season of The Green Hornet, Lee found himself out of work and opened the Jun Fan Gung Fu Institute in Chinatown, Los Angeles. The controversial match with Wong Jack-man influenced Lee's philosophy about martial arts. Lee concluded that the fight had lasted too long and that he had failed to live up to his potential using his Wing Chun techniques. He took the view that traditional martial arts techniques were too rigid and formalized to be practical in scenarios of chaotic street fighting. Lee decided to develop a system with an emphasis on "practicality, flexibility, speed, and efficiency". He started to use different methods of training such as weight training for strength, running for endurance, stretching for flexibility, and many others, which he constantly adapted, including fencing and basic boxing techniques.

Jeet Kune Do originated in 1967. The name means "way of the intercepting fist" in Cantonese. This was a new hybrid system that took footwork from boxing, kicks from kung fu, and technique from fencing. Lee emphasized what he called "the style of no style". This consisted of getting rid of the formalized approach that Lee claimed was indicative of traditional styles. Lee felt that even the system he now called Jun Fan Gung Fu was too restrictive, and it eventually evolved into a philosophy and martial art he would come to call Jeet Kune Do or the Way of the Intercepting Fist. It is a term he would later regret, because Jeet Kune Do implied specific parameters that styles connote, whereas the idea of his martial art was to exist outside of parameters and limitations.

At the time, two of Lee's martial arts students were Hollywood script writer Stirling Silliphant and actor James Coburn. In 1969, the three worked on a script for a film titled The Silent Flute, and they went together on a location-hunt to India. The project was not realized at the time, but the 1978 film Circle of Iron, starring David Carradine, was based on the same plot. In 2010, producer Paul Maslansky was reported to have planned and received funding for a film based on the original script for The Silent Flute.

In 1969, Lee made a brief appearance in the Silliphant-penned film Marlowe, where he played a hoodlum hired to intimidate private detective Philip Marlowe, played by James Garner, who uses his martial arts abilities to commit acts of vandalization to intimidate Marlowe. The same year, he was credited as the karate advisor in The Wrecking Crew, the fourth installment of the Matt Helm comedy spy-fi film starring Dean Martin. Also that year, Lee acted in one episode of Here Come the Brides and Blondie.

In 1970, Lee was responsible for producing the fight choreography of A Walk in the Spring Rain, starring Ingrid Bergman and Anthony Quinn, again written by Silliphant.

=== 1971–1973: Hong Kong films, stardom, and Hollywood breakthrough ===
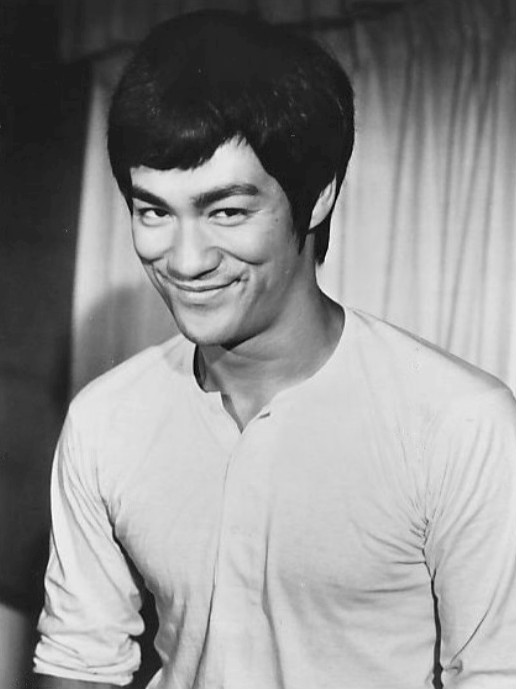
Lee in 1971

In 1971, Lee appeared in four episodes of the television series Longstreet, written by Silliphant. Lee played Li Tsung, the martial arts instructor of the title character Mike Longstreet, played by James Franciscus, and important aspects of his martial arts philosophy were written into the script. According to statements made by Lee, and also by Linda Lee Cadwell after Lee's death, Lee pitched a television series of his own in 1971, tentatively titled The Warrior, discussions of which were confirmed by Warner Bros. During a December 9, 1971, television interview on The Pierre Berton Show, Lee stated that both Paramount and Warner Bros. wanted him "to be in a modernized type of a thing and that they think the Western idea is out, whereas I want to do the Western".

According to Cadwell, Lee's concept was retooled and renamed Kung Fu, but Warner Bros. gave Lee no credit. Warner Bros. states that they had for some time been developing an identical concept, created by two writers and producers, Ed Spielman and Howard Friedlander in 1969, as stated also by Lee's biographer Matthew Polly. According to these sources, the reason Lee was not cast was because he had a thick accent, but Fred Weintraub attributes that to his ethnicity.

The role of the Shaolin monk in Kung Fu was eventually awarded to then-non-martial artist David Carradine. In an interview with The Pierre Berton Show, Lee stated he understood Warner Bros.' attitudes towards casting in the series: "They think that business-wise it is a risk. I don't blame them. If the situation were reversed, and an American star were to come to Hong Kong, and I was the man with the money, I would have my own concerns as to whether the acceptance would be there".

Producer Fred Weintraub had advised Lee to return to Hong Kong and make a feature film that he could showcase to executives in Hollywood. Not happy with his supporting roles in the US, Lee returned to Hong Kong. Unaware that The Green Hornet had been played to success in Hong Kong and was unofficially referred to as "The Kato Show", he was surprised to be recognized as the star of the show. After negotiating with both Shaw Brothers Studio and Golden Harvest, Lee signed a film contract to star in two films produced by Golden Harvest.

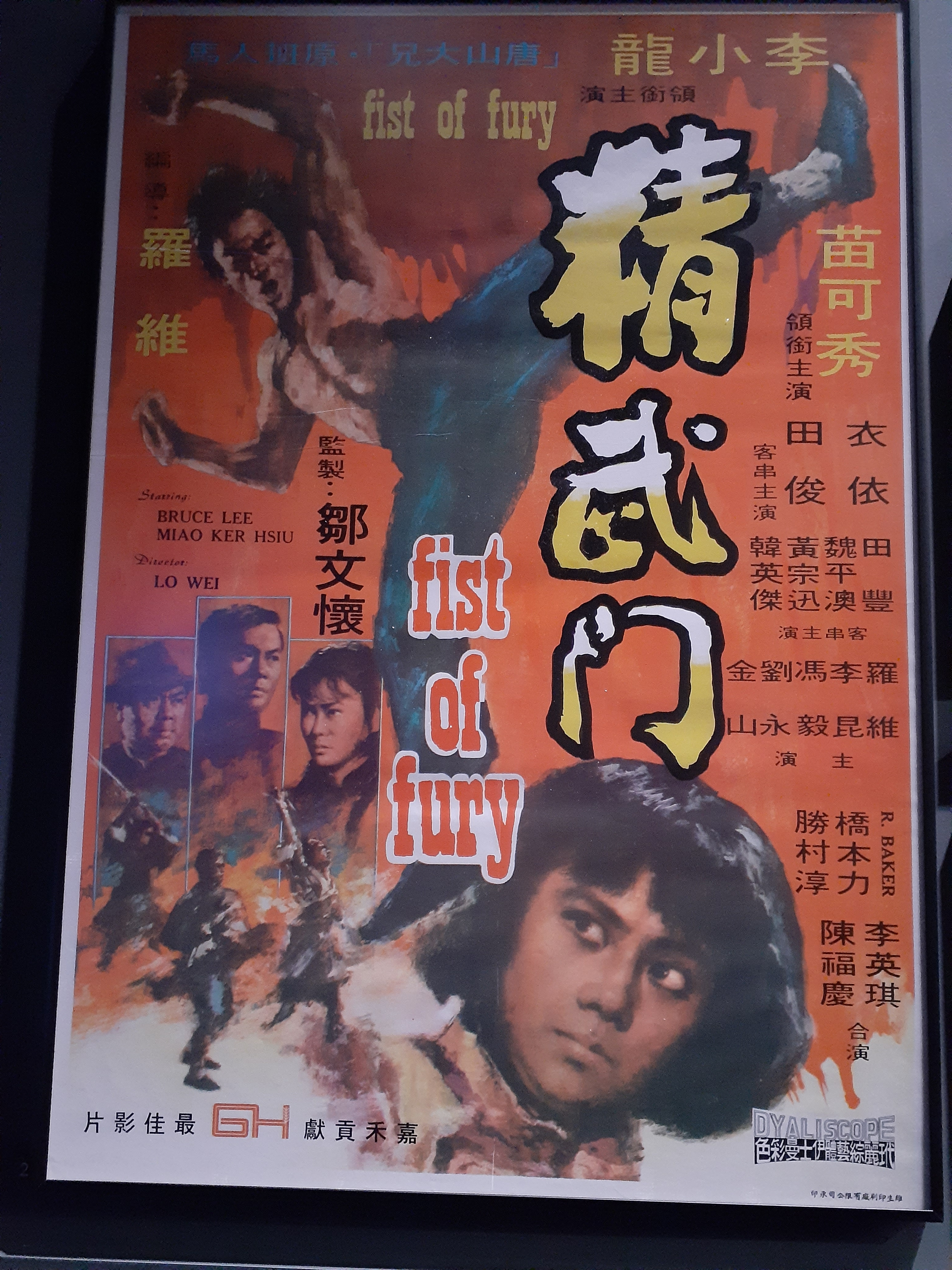
Poster for Fist of Fury (1972), displayed at the Hong Kong Heritage Museum

Lee played his first leading role in The Big Boss (1971), which proved to be an enormous box-office success across Asia and catapulted him to instant stardom in Hong Kong. He followed up with Fist of Fury (1972), which broke the box office records set previously by The Big Boss, with film critic Blake Howard writing that Lee was "cresting the wave of international super-stardom". Having finished his initial two-year contract, Lee negotiated a new deal with Golden Harvest. Lee later formed his own company, Concord Production Inc., with Chow. For his third film, The Way of the Dragon (1972), he was given complete control of the film's production as the writer, director, star, and choreographer of the fight scenes. In 1964, at a demonstration in Long Beach, California, Lee met karate champion Chuck Norris. In The Way of the Dragon, Lee introduced Norris to moviegoers as his opponent. Their showdown has been characterized as "one of the best fight scenes in martial arts and film history". Fist of Fury and Way of the Dragon grossed an estimated US$100 million and US$130 million worldwide, respectively.

From August to October 1972, Lee began work on his fourth Golden Harvest film, Game of Death. He began filming some scenes, including his fight sequence with 7 ft 2 in (218 cm) American basketball star Kareem Abdul-Jabbar, a former student. Production stopped in November 1972 when Warner Bros. offered Lee the opportunity to star in Enter the Dragon, the first film to be produced jointly by Concord, Golden Harvest, and Warner Bros. Filming began in Hong Kong in February 1973 and was completed in April 1973.

One month into the filming, another production company, Starseas Motion Pictures, promoted Lee as a leading actor in Fist of Unicorn, although he had merely agreed to choreograph the fight sequences in the film as a favor to his long-time friend Unicorn Chan. Lee planned to sue the production company but retained his friendship with Chan. However, only a few months after the completion of Enter the Dragon, and six days before its release, July 26, 1973, Lee died.

Enter the Dragon went on to become one of the year's highest-grossing films and cemented Lee as a martial arts legend. It was made for US$850,000 in 1973, the equivalent of $4 million adjusted for inflation as of 2007. Enter the Dragon is estimated to have grossed over $400 million worldwide, the equivalent of over $2 billion adjusted for inflation as of 2022. The TV show Kung Fu starring David Carradine debuted in February 1972, reaching #1 by mid-1973 further contributing to a fad in martial arts. The song "Kung Fu Fighting" and Marvel's Master of Kung Fu comic book came out in 1974.

=== 1978–2023: posthumous work ===
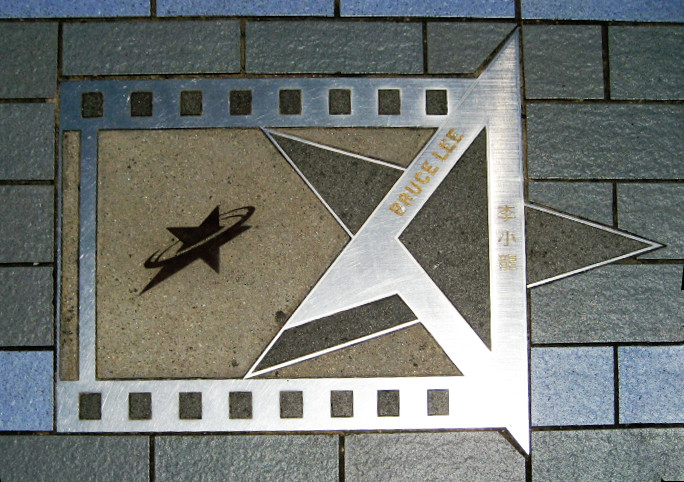
Bruce Lee's star at the Avenue of Stars, Hong Kong

Robert Clouse, the director of Enter the Dragon, together with Golden Harvest, revived Lee's unfinished film Game of Death. Lee had shot over 100 minutes of footage, including outtakes, for Game of Death before shooting was stopped to allow him to work on Enter the Dragon. In addition to Abdul-Jabbar, George Lazenby, Hapkido master Ji Han-jae, and another of Lee's students, Dan Inosanto, appeared in the film, which culminated in Lee's character, Hai Tien, clad in a yellow tracksuit (Note: Film producer Andre Morgan, who worked with Lee on the set of Game of Death, recalls that a choice had to be made from what was made available: a yellow suit or a black suit. The yellow suit was chosen because it allowed a footprint from a kick to be seen on film in a fighting scene with Kareem.) taking on a series of different challengers on each floor as they make their way through a five-level pagoda.

In a controversial move, Robert Clouse finished the film using a Lee look-alike (Kim Tai Chung, with Yuen Biao as a stunt double) and archive footage of Lee from his other films with a new storyline and cast. It was released in 1978. The cobbled-together film contained only fifteen minutes of actual footage of Lee. The unused footage Lee had filmed was recovered 22 years later and included in the documentary Bruce Lee: A Warrior's Journey.

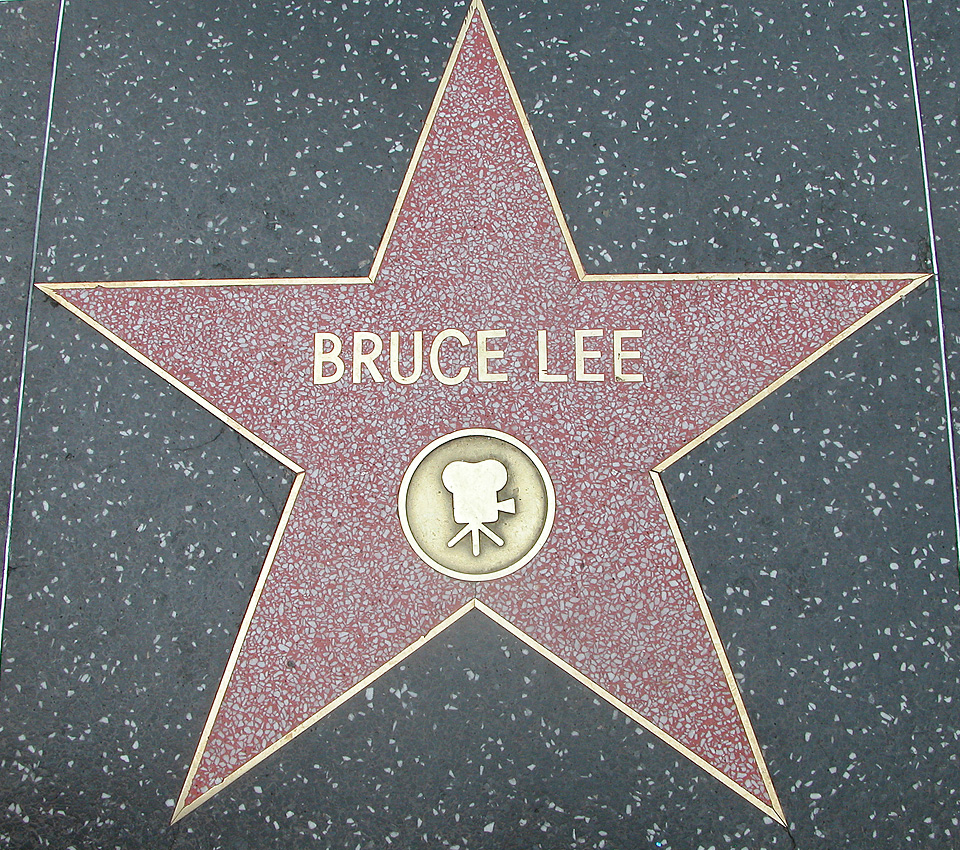
Bruce Lee's star on the Hollywood Walk of Fame

In 1972, after the success of The Big Boss and Fist of Fury, a third film was planned by Raymond Chow at Golden Harvest to be directed by Lo Wei, titled Yellow-Faced Tiger. However, at the time, Lee decided to direct and produce his script for Way of the Dragon instead. Although Lee had formed a production company with Raymond Chow, a period film was also planned from September–November 1973 with the competing Shaw Brothers Studio, to be directed by either Chor Yuen or Cheng Kang, and written by Yi Kang and Chang Cheh, titled The Seven Sons of the Jade Dragon.

In 2015, Perfect Storm Entertainment and Bruce Lee's daughter, Shannon Lee, announced that the series The Warrior would be produced and would air on Cinemax. Filmmaker Justin Lin was chosen to direct the series. Production began in October 2017, in Cape Town, South Africa. In April 2019, Cinemax renewed the series for a second season. The series ended after three seasons, in 2023.

In March 2021, it was announced that producer Jason Kothari had acquired the rights to The Silent Flute "to become a miniseries, which would have John Fusco as a screenwriter and executive producer.

=== Unproduced works ===
Lee had also worked on several scripts himself. A tape containing a recording of Lee narrating the basic storyline to a film tentatively titled Southern Fist/Northern Leg exists, showing some similarities with the canned script for The Silent Flute (Circle of Iron). Another script had the title Green Bamboo Warrior, set in San Francisco, planned to co-star Bolo Yeung and to be produced by Andrew Vajna. Photoshoot costume tests were organized for some of these planned film projects.

== Martial arts and fitness ==
Bruce Lee
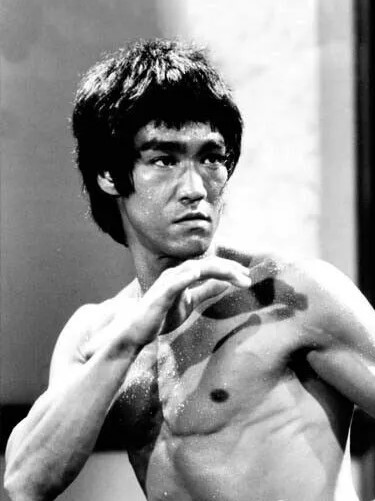
- Height: 1.73 m (5 ft 8 in)
- Style: Jeet Kune Do (founder); Chinese martial arts (Wing Chun, tai chi), boxing, street fighting, judo, taekwondo, karate, wrestling, arnis, epée fencing, hapkido, various other styles (by personal tutoring and research)
- Teachers: Ip Man and Wong Shun-leung (wing chun), Brother Edward (boxing), Jhoon Rhee (taekwondo), Fred Sato and Gene LeBell (judo); Dan Inosanto (arnis)

Other information
- Notable students: Jesse Glover, James DeMile, Linda Lee Cadwell, Dan Inosanto, Taky Kimura, Ted Wong, James Yimm Lee, Joe Lewis, Jhoon Rhee, Mike Stone, Gene LeBell, Chuck Norris, Roman Polański, Sharon Tate, James Coburn, Kareem Abdul-Jabbar, Brandon Lee, others

Lee's films are known for popularising the side kick, roundhouse kick, grappling, spinning heel kick, armbar, weapons such as the nunchaku, and his distinctive kiai. Lee was also known for popularising the one-inch punch and the two-finger push-up.

=== Striking ===
Lee's first introduction to martial arts was through his father, from whom he learned the fundamentals of Wu-style tai chi. In his teens, Lee became involved in Hong Kong gang conflicts, which led to frequent street fights. The largest influence on Lee's martial arts development was his study of Wing Chun. Lee was 16 years old under the Wing Chun teacher Ip Man, between late 1956 and 1957, after losing to rival gang members.

Ip's regular classes generally consisted of form practice, chi sao (sticking hands) drills, wooden dummy techniques, and free sparring. There was no set pattern for the classes. Other Chinese martial arts styles Lee trained in were Northern Praying Mantis, Southern Praying Mantis, Eagle Claw, Tan Tui, Law Hon, Mizongyi, Wa K'ung, Monkey, Southern Dragon, Fujian White Crane, Choy Li Fut, Hung Gar, Choy Gar, Fut Gar, Mok Gar, Yau Kung Moon, Li Gar, and Lau Gar. Martial arts expert Donn F. Draeger regarded Lee as worthy of a Kyokushin 6th dan by the standards of the 1970s.

Lee was trained in boxing, between 1956 and 1958, by Brother Edward, coach of the St. Francis Xavier's College boxing team. Lee went on to win the Hong Kong Schools boxing tournament in 1958 while scoring knockdowns against the previous champion Gary Elms in the final. After moving to the United States, Lee was heavily influenced by heavyweight boxing champion Muhammad Ali, whose footwork he studied and incorporated into his style in the 1960s.

Lee demonstrated his Jeet Kune Do martial arts at the Long Beach International Karate Championships in 1964 and 1968, with the latter having higher-quality video footage available. Lee is seen demonstrating quick eye strikes before his opponent can block and demonstrating the one-inch punch on several volunteers. He demonstrates chi sao drills while blindfolded against an opponent, probing for weaknesses in his opponent while scoring with punches and takedowns. Lee then participates in a full-contact sparring bout against an opponent, with both wearing leather headgear.

Lee is seen implementing his Jeet Kune Do concept of economical motion, using Ali-inspired footwork to keep out of range while counter-attacking with backfists and straight punches. He halts attacks with stop-hit side kicks and quickly executes several sweeps and head kicks. The opponent repeatedly attempts to attack Lee but is never able to connect with a clean hit; he is once able to come close with a spin kick, but Lee counters it. The footage was reviewed by Black Belt magazine in 1995, concluding that "the action is as fast and furious as anything in Lee's films."

It was at the 1964 championships that Lee first met taekwondo master Jhoongoo Rhee. While Rhee taught Lee the side kick in detail, Lee taught Rhee the "non-telegraphic" punch. Rhee learned what he calls the "accupunch" from Lee and incorporated it into American taekwondo. The "accupunch" is a rapid fast punch that is very difficult to block, based on human reaction time—"the idea is to finish the execution of the punch before the opponent can complete the brain-to-wrist communication."

Lee commonly used the oblique kick, made popular much later in mixed martial arts. It is called the jeet tek, "stop kick" or "intercepting kick", in Jeet Kune Do.

=== Grappling ===
Lee favored cross-training between different fighting styles, and had a particular interest in grappling. Lee trained with several judo practitioners in Seattle and California, among them Fred Sato, Jesse Glover, Taky Kimura, Hayward Nishioka, and Wally Jay, as well as Gene LeBell. Many of his first students were proficient in judo and other arts, and he learned as much as he taught. After befriending LeBell on the set of The Green Hornet, Lee offered to teach him striking arts in exchange for being taught grappling techniques. LeBell had been taught catch wrestling by prestigious grapplers Lou Thesz and Ed Lewis, and notable techniques of both judo and catch wrestling can be seen in Lee's Tao of Jeet Kune Do. He also learned grappling moves from hapkido master Ji Han-jae.

According to Glover, Lee only found judo ineffective in the action of getting hold of the opponent. In their first training together, Glover showed Lee an osoto gari, which Lee considered not a bad technique, but he disliked that Glover had needed to hold onto Lee. While in Seattle, Lee developed anti-grappling techniques against opponents trying to tackle him or take him to the ground. Glover recalled that Lee "definitely would not go to the ground if he had the opportunity to get you standing up". Nonetheless, Lee expressed to LeBell a wish to integrate judo into his fighting style. He incorporated the osoto gari into Jeet Kune Do, among other throws, armlocks and chokeholds from judo.

Although Lee opined that grappling was of little use in action choreography because it was not visually distinctive, he showcased grappling moves in his films, such as Way of the Dragon, where his character finishes his opponent Chuck Norris with a neck hold inspired by LeBell, and Enter the Dragon, whose prolog features Lee submitting his opponent Sammo Hung with an armbar. Game of Death also features Lee and Han-jae exchanging grappling moves, as well as Lee using wrestling against the character played by Kareem Abdul-Jabbar.

Lee was also influenced by the training routine of The Great Gama, an Indian/Pakistani pehlwani wrestling champion known for his grappling strength. Lee incorporated Gama's exercises into his training routine.

=== Street fighting ===
Another major influence on Lee was Hong Kong's street fighting culture in the form of rooftop fights. In the mid-20th century, soaring crime in Hong Kong, combined with limited Hong Kong Police manpower, led to many young Hongkongers learning martial arts for self-defense. Around the 1960s, there were about 400 martial arts schools in Hong Kong, teaching their distinctive styles of martial arts. In Hong Kong's street fighting culture, there emerged a rooftop fight scene in the 1950s and 1960s, where gangs from rival martial arts schools challenged each other to bare-knuckle fights on Hong Kong's rooftops, to avoid crackdowns by British colonial authorities. Lee frequently participated in these Hong Kong rooftop fights. He combined different techniques from different martial arts schools into his own hybrid martial arts style.

When Lee returned to Hong Kong in the early 1970s, his reputation as "the fastest fist in the east" routinely led to locals challenging him to street fights. He sometimes accepted these challenges and engaged in street fights, which led to some criticism from the press portraying him as violent at the time.

=== Fitness ===
At 172 cm (5 ft 8 in) and weighing 64 kg (141 lb), Lee was renowned for his physical fitness and vigor, achieved by using a dedicated fitness regimen to become as strong as possible. After his match with Wong Jack-man in 1965, Lee changed his approach toward martial arts training. Lee felt that many martial artists of his time did not spend enough time on physical conditioning. Lee included all elements of total fitness—muscular strength, muscular endurance, cardiovascular endurance, and flexibility. He used traditional bodybuilding techniques to build some muscle mass, though not overdone, as that could decrease speed or flexibility. At the same time, concerning balance, Lee maintained that mental and spiritual preparation are fundamental to the success of physical training in martial arts skills. In Tao of Jeet Kune Do he wrote:

Training is one of the most neglected phases of athletics. Too much time is given to the development of skill and too little to the development of the individual for participation. ... JKD, ultimately is not a matter of petty techniques but of highly developed spirituality and physique.

According to Linda Lee Cadwell, soon after he moved to the United States, Lee started to take nutrition seriously and developed an interest in health foods, high-protein drinks, and vitamin and mineral supplements. He later concluded that achieving a high-performance body was akin to maintaining the engine of a high-performance automobile. Allegorically, as one could not keep a car running on low-octane fuels, one could not sustain one's body with a steady diet of junk food, and with "the wrong fuel", one's body would perform sluggishly or sloppily.

Lee avoided baked goods and refined flour, describing them as providing empty calories that did nothing for his body. He was known for being a fan of Asian cuisine for its variety and often ate meals with a combination of vegetables, rice, and fish. Lee had a dislike for dairy products and as a result, used powdered milk in his diet.

Dan Inosanto recalls Lee practiced meditation as the first action on his schedule.

== Artistry ==
=== Philosophy ===
While best known as a martial artist, Lee studied drama and Asian and Western philosophy, starting while a student at the University of Washington. He was well-read and had an extensive library dominated by martial arts subjects and philosophical texts. His books on martial arts and fighting philosophy are known for their philosophical assertions, both inside and outside of martial arts circles. His eclectic philosophy often mirrored his fighting beliefs, though he was quick to say that his martial arts were solely a metaphor for such teachings.

He believed that any knowledge ultimately led to self-knowledge. He said that his chosen method of self-expression was martial arts. His influences include Taoism and Buddhism. Lee's philosophy was very much in opposition to the conservative worldview advocated by Confucianism. John Little states that Lee was an atheist. When asked in 1972 about his religious affiliation, he replied, "None whatsoever". When asked if he believed in God, he said, "To be perfectly frank, I really do not."

In his notebooks, Lee cited and commented on passages from Plato, David Hume, René Descartes, and Thomas Aquinas, from Western philosophy, and Lao-tzu, Chuang-tzu, Miyamoto Musashi, and Alan Watts from Eastern thought. He was particularly interested in the Indian mystic Jiddu Krishnamurti.

=== Poetry ===
Aside from martial arts and philosophy, which focus on the physical aspect and self-consciousness for truths and principles, Lee also wrote poetry that reflected his emotions and a stage in his life collectively. Many forms of art remain concordant with the artist creating them. Lee's principle of self-expression was applied to his poetry as well. His daughter Shannon Lee said, "He did write poetry; he was really the consummate artist."

His poetic works were originally handwritten on paper, then later on edited and published, with John Little being the major author (editor), for Bruce Lee's works. Linda Lee Cadwell (Bruce Lee's wife) shared her husband's notes, poems, and experiences with followers. She mentioned, "Lee's poems are, by American standards, rather dark—reflecting the deeper, less exposed recesses of the human psyche".

Most of Bruce Lee's poems are categorized as anti-poetry or fall into a paradox. The mood in his poems shows the side of the man that can be compared with other poets such as Robert Frost, one of many well-known poets expressing himself with dark poetic works. The paradox taken from the Yin and Yang symbol in martial arts was also integrated into his poetry. His martial arts and philosophy contribute a great part to his poetry. The free verse form of Lee's poetry reflects his quote "Be formless ... shapeless, like water."

== Personal life ==
=== Names ===
Lee's Cantonese birth name was Lee Jun-fan (李振藩). The name homophonically means "return again", and was given to Lee by his mother, who felt he would return to the United States once he came of age. Because of his mother's superstitious nature, she had originally named him Sai-fon (細鳳), which is a feminine name meaning "small phoenix". The English name "Bruce" is thought to have been given by the hospital's attending physician, Dr. Mary Glover.

Lee had three other Chinese names: Lee Yuen-cham (李源鑫), a family/clan name; Lee Yuen-kam (李元鑒), which he used as a student name while he was attending La Salle College, and his Chinese screen name Lee Siu-lung (李小龍; Siu-lung means "little dragon"). Lee's given name Jun-fan was originally written in Chinese as 震藩; however, the Jun (震) Chinese character was identical to part of his grandfather's name, Lee Jun-biu (李震彪). Hence, the Chinese character for Jun in Lee's name was changed to the homonym 振 instead, to avoid naming taboo in Chinese tradition.

=== Family and ancestry ===
Lee's father, Lee Hoi-chuen, was one of the leading Cantonese opera and film actors at the time and was embarking on a year-long opera tour with his family on the eve of the Japanese invasion of Hong Kong. Lee Hoi-chuen had been touring the United States for many years and performing in numerous Chinese communities there.

Although many of his peers decided to stay in the US, Lee Hoi-chuen returned to Hong Kong after Bruce's birth. Within months, Hong Kong was invaded and the Lees lived for three years and eight months under Japanese occupation. After the war ended, Lee Hoi-chuen resumed his acting career and became a more popular actor during Hong Kong's rebuilding years.

Lee's mother, Grace, was from one of the wealthiest and most powerful clans in Hong Kong, the Ho-tungs. She was the half-niece of Sir Robert Ho-tung, the Eurasian patriarch of the clan. As such, the young Bruce Lee grew up in an affluent and privileged environment. Despite the advantage of his family's status, the neighborhood in which Lee grew up became overcrowded, dangerous, and full of gang rivalries due to an influx of refugees fleeing communist China for Hong Kong, at that time a British Crown Colony.

Grace is reported as either the adopted or biological daughter of Ho Kom-tong (Ho Gumtong, 何甘棠) and the half-niece of Sir Robert Ho-tung, both notable Hong Kong businessmen and philanthropists. Bruce was the fourth of five children: Phoebe Lee (李秋源), Agnes Lee (李秋鳳), Peter Lee, and Robert Lee.

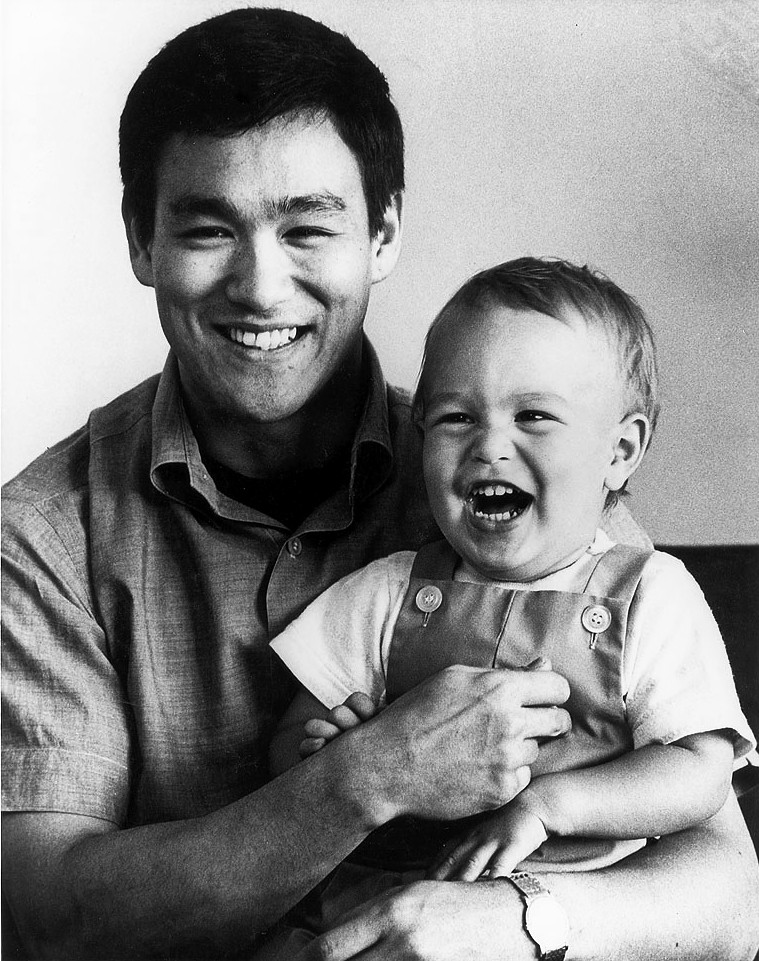
Lee with his son Brandon in 1966

Grace's parentage remains unclear. Linda Lee, in her 1989 biography The Bruce Lee Story, suggests that Grace had a German father and was a Catholic. Bruce Thomas, in his 1994 biography Bruce Lee: Fighting Spirit, suggests that Grace had a Chinese mother and a German father. Lee's relative Eric Peter Ho, in his 2010 book Tracing My Children's Lineage, suggests that Grace was born in Shanghai to a Eurasian woman named Cheung King-sin. Eric Peter Ho said that Grace Lee was the daughter of a mixed-race Shanghainese woman and her father was Ho Kom Tong. Grace Lee herself reported that her mother was English and her father was Chinese. Fredda Dudley Balling said Grace Lee was three-quarters Chinese and one-quarter British.

In the 2018 biography Bruce Lee: A Life, Matthew Polly identifies Lee's maternal grandfather as Ho Kom-tong, who had often been reported as his adoptive grandfather. Ho Kom-tong's father, Charles Maurice Bosman, was a Dutch Jewish businessman from Rotterdam. He moved to Hong Kong with the Dutch East India Company and served as the Dutch consul to Hong Kong at one time. He had a Chinese concubine named Sze Tai with whom he had six children, including Ho Kom Tong. Bosman subsequently abandoned his family and immigrated to California. Ho Kom Tong became a wealthy businessman with a wife, 13 concubines, and a British mistress who gave birth to Grace.

His younger brother Robert Lee Jun-fai is a musician and singer; he performed in the Hong Kong group The Thunderbirds. A few singles were sung mostly or all in English. Also released was Lee singing a duet with Irene Ryder. Lee Jun-fai lived with Lee in Los Angeles in the United States and stayed. After Lee's death, Lee Jun-fai released an album and a single by the same name dedicated to Lee called "The Ballad of Bruce Lee".

=== Marriage and children ===
While studying at the University of Washington, Lee met his future wife, Linda Emery, a fellow student studying to become a teacher. As relations between people of different races were still banned in many US states, they married in secret in August 1964. Lee had two children with Linda: Brandon Lee (1965–1993) and Shannon Lee (born 1969).

After Bruce Lee's death in 1973, Linda continued to promote his martial art, Jeet Kune Do. She wrote the 1975 book Bruce Lee: The Man Only I Knew, upon which the 1993 feature film Dragon: The Bruce Lee Story was based. Her biography, The Bruce Lee Story, was published in 1989. She retired in 2001 from the family estate.

Lee died when his son Brandon was eight years old. While alive, Lee taught Brandon martial arts and would invite him to visit sets. This gave Brandon the desire to act and he went on to study the craft. As a young adult, Brandon Lee found some success acting in action-oriented pictures such as Legacy of Rage (1986), Showdown in Little Tokyo (1991), and Rapid Fire (1992). In 1993, at the age of 28, Brandon Lee died after being accidentally shot by a prop gun on the set of The Crow.

Lee died when his daughter Shannon was four. In her youth she studied Jeet Kune Do under Richard Bustillo, one of her father's students; however, her serious studies did not begin until the late 1990s. To train for parts in action movies, she studied Jeet Kune Do with Ted Wong.

=== Friends, students, and contemporaries ===
Lee's brother Robert with his friends Taky Kimura, Dan Inosanto, Steve McQueen, James Coburn, and Peter Chin were his pallbearers. Coburn was a martial arts student and a friend of Lee. Coburn worked with Lee and Stirling Silliphant on developing The Silent Flute. Upon Lee's early death, at his funeral, Coburn gave a eulogy. Regarding McQueen, Lee made no secret that he wanted everything McQueen had and would stop at nothing to get it. Inosanto and Kimura were friends and disciples of Lee. Inosanto would go on to train Lee's son Brandon. Kimura continued to teach Lee's craft in Seattle. According to Lee's wife, Chin was a lifelong family friend and a student of Lee.

James Yimm Lee (no relation) was one of Lee's three personally certified 3rd rank instructors and co-founded the Jun Fan Gung Fu Institute in Oakland where he taught Jun Fan Gung Fu in Lee's absence. James was responsible for introducing Lee to Ed Parker, the organizer of the Long Beach International Karate Championships, where Lee was first introduced to the martial arts community. Hollywood couple Roman Polański and Sharon Tate studied martial arts with Lee. Polański flew Lee to Switzerland to train with him. Tate studied with Lee in preparation for her role in The Wrecking Crew. After Tate was murdered by the Manson Family, Polański initially suspected Lee.

Screenwriter Stirling Silliphant was a martial arts student and a friend of Lee. Silliphant worked with Lee and James Coburn on developing The Silent Flute. Lee acted and provided his martial arts expertise in several projects penned by Silliphant, the first in Marlowe (1969) where Lee plays Winslow Wong a hoodlum well-versed in martial arts. Lee also did fight choreographies for the film A Walk in the Spring Rain (1970) and played Li Tsung, a Jeet Kune Do instructor who teaches the main character in the television show Longstreet (1971). Elements of his martial arts philosophy were included in the script for the latter.

Basketball player Kareem Abdul-Jabbar studied martial arts and developed a friendship with Lee. Actor and karate champion Chuck Norris was a friend and training partner of Lee's. After Lee's death, Norris said he kept in touch with Lee's family. Judoka and professional wrestler Gene LeBell became a friend of Lee on the set of The Green Hornet. They trained together and exchanged their knowledge of martial arts.

Taiwanese actress Betty Ting immediately came under media's spotlight after it was revealed that Bruce Lee was found unconscious at her flat before his death. At her testimony Ting said she was asked by producer Raymond Chow, who in turn was told by Lee's family, not to disclose that Lee was at her apartment, which contributed to the misinformation that Lee died at his own house. Ting later said that Lee fell in love with her and the two shared a close relation. Her constant presence by Lee's side earned her the affectionate nickname of "Little Dragon Girl" (or Bruce's Girl).

=== Drug use ===
In July 2021, a private collection of over 40 handwritten letters Lee made to fellow Fist of Fury actor Robert "Bob" Baker was sold for $462,500 at Heritage Auctions. These letters were written from 1967 to 1973 and included requests by Lee for Baker to mail him cocaine, pain killers, psilocybin and other drugs for his personal use. Doctor Poon Wai-ming in Hong Kong said cocaine could have caused his collapse in May 1973, two months before his death.

== Death ==
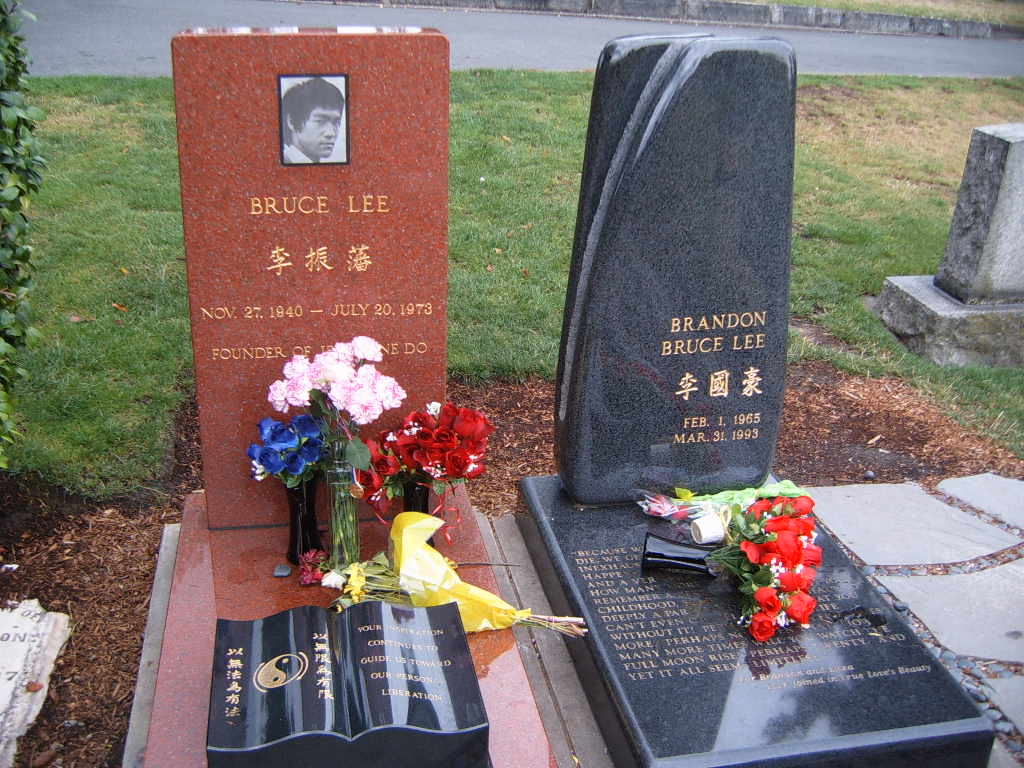
Bruce Lee is buried next to his son Brandon at Lake View Cemetery in Seattle.

On May 10, 1973, Lee collapsed during an automated dialogue replacement session for Enter the Dragon at Orange Sky Golden Harvest Film Studio in Hong Kong. Because he was having epileptic seizures and headaches, he was rushed to Hong Kong Baptist Hospital, where doctors diagnosed cerebral edema. He had a high fever and was completely unconscious without any signs of breathing. They were able to reduce the swelling through the administration of mannitol. A brain scan in the United States after this diagnosed Bruce Lee with convulsive disorder.

On July 20, 1973, Lee was in Hong Kong planning to have dinner with actor George Lazenby, with whom he intended to make a film. According to Lee's wife Linda and testimony at Lee's coroner's court, Lee met producer Raymond Chow at 2 p.m. at home to discuss the making of the film Game of Death. They worked until 4 p.m. and then drove together to the home of Lee's colleague Betty Ting, arriving at around 5. The three then went over the script at Ting's home. At around 7 Lee, having a headache, took a painkiller from Ting and took a nap. Chow left around an hour later to attend a dinner meeting with Lazenby, which Lee was expected to join later.

When Lee did not arrive at the dinner, Chow came to the apartment at around 9:45 p.m., but he was unable to wake Lee up. Chu Poh-hwye, a private doctor of Ting, was summoned at 10, as Lee's doctor was unreachable, and spent ten minutes attempting to revive Lee, who by then no longer had any vital signs, before sending him by ambulance to Queen Elizabeth Hospital. Lee was declared dead on arrival at the age of 32.

Lee was buried in Lake View Cemetery in Seattle. Pallbearers at Lee's funeral on July 25, 1973, included Taky Kimura, Steve McQueen, James Coburn, Dan Inosanto, Peter Chin, and Lee's brother Robert.

=== Possible causes of death ===
Donald Teare, a senior British pathologist recommended by Scotland Yard who had overseen over 1,000 autopsies, was assigned to perform an autopsy on Lee. His conclusion was "death by misadventure" caused by cerebral edema due to a reaction to compounds present in the combination medication Equagesic. According to autopsy reports, Lee's brain had swollen from 1,400 to 1,575 grams, a 12.5% increase. Lee had taken Equagesic on the day of his death, which contained both aspirin and the sedative meprobamate, although he had taken it many times before. The Coroner's Court unanimously returned a "death by misadventure" verdict.

Lee's iconic status and untimely death fed many rumors and theories. These included murder involving the triads and a supposed curse on him and his family. Tabloids and magazines in Hong Kong publicised multiple conspiracy theories on Lee's death for viewership.

Although there was initial speculation that cannabis found in Lee's stomach may have contributed to his death, Teare said it would "be both 'irresponsible and irrational' to say that [cannabis] might have triggered either the events of Bruce's collapse on May 10 or his death on July 20". R. R. Lycette, the clinical pathologist at Queen Elizabeth Hospital, reported at the coroner hearing that the death could not have been caused by cannabis. The Armed Forces Institute of Pathology of the United States concluded that they were unable to attribute Lee's death to cannabis intoxication.

In a 2018 biography, author Matthew Polly consulted with medical experts and theorized that the cerebral edema that killed Lee had been caused by over-exertion and heat stroke; heat stroke was not considered at the time because it was then a poorly understood condition. Furthermore, Lee had his underarm sweat glands removed in late 1972, in the belief that underarm sweat was unphotogenic on film. Polly further theorized that this caused Lee's body to overheat while practicing in hot temperatures on May 10 and July 20, 1973, resulting in heat stroke that in turn exacerbated the cerebral edema that led to his death.

In an article in the December 2022 issue of Clinical Kidney Journal, a team of researchers examined the various theories regarding Lee's cause of death, and concluded that his fatal cerebral edema was brought on by hyponatremia, an insufficient concentration of sodium in the blood. The authors noted that several risk factors predisposed Lee to hyponatremia, including excessive water intake, insufficient solute intake, alcohol consumption, and use or overuse of multiple drugs that impair the ability of the kidneys to excrete excess fluids. Lee's symptoms before his death were also found to closely match known cases of fatal hyponatremia.

In July 2025, the Hong Kong TVB program Ctrl+F The Truth concluded that Lee died of sudden unexpected death in epilepsy, based on opinions from medical experts, after other causes of death, including cerebral edema caused by aspirin allergy, which had been suspected by the court, were considered unlikely. It was presumed that a lack of professional knowledge or attempts to protect Lee's legacy hid the true cause of his death at the time.

== Legacy and cultural impact ==
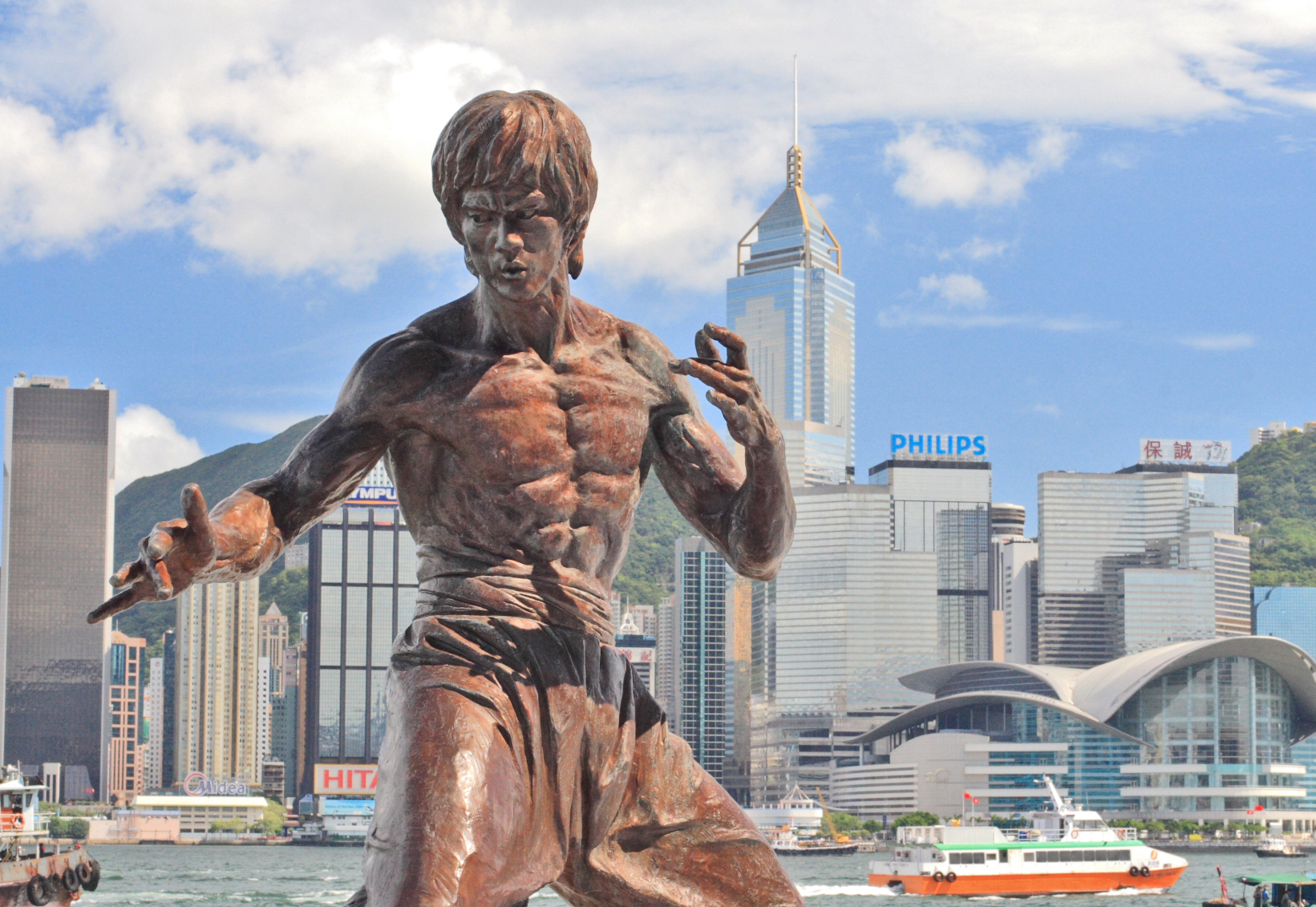
Bruce Lee statue in Hong Kong

Lee is considered by some commentators and martial artists to be the most influential martial artist of all time, and a pop culture icon of the 20th century, who bridged the gap between East and West. Time named Lee one of the 100 most important people of the 20th century.

A number of biography books have been written about Lee, one of which has sold more than 4 million copies by 1988.

=== Action films ===
Lee was largely responsible for launching the "kung fu craze" of the 1970s. He initially introduced kung fu to the West with American television shows such as The Green Hornet and Kung Fu, before the kung fu craze began to dominate Hong Kong martial arts films in 1973. Lee's success inspired a wave of Western martial arts films and television shows throughout the 1970s–1990s (launching the careers of Western martial arts stars such as Jean-Claude Van Damme, Steven Seagal and Chuck Norris), as well as the more general integration of Asian martial arts into Western action films and television shows during the 1980s–1990s.

Enter the Dragon has been cited as one of the most influential action films of all time. Sascha Matuszak of Vice said Enter the Dragon "is referenced in all manner of media, the plot line and characters continue to influence storytellers today, and the impact was particularly felt in the revolutionizing way the film portrayed African-Americans, Asians and traditional martial arts." Kuan-Hsing Chen and Beng Huat Chua cited fight scenes in Lee's films such as Enter the Dragon as being influential for the way they pitched "an elemental story of good against evil in such a spectacle-saturated way".

A number of action filmmakers around the world have cited Bruce Lee as a formative influence on their careers, including Hong Kong action film directors Jackie Chan and John Woo, and Hollywood filmmakers such as Quentin Tarantino and Brett Ratner.

=== Martial arts and combat sports ===
Jeet Kune Do, a hybrid martial arts philosophy drawing from different combat disciplines that was founded by Lee, is sometimes credited with paving the way for the combat sport mixed martial arts (MMA). The concept of mixed martial arts was popularized in the West by Bruce Lee via his system of Jeet Kune Do. Lee believed that "the best fighter is not a Boxer, Karate or Judo man. The best fighter is someone who can adapt to any style, to be formless, to adopt an individual's own style and not following the system of styles."

In 2004, Ultimate Fighting Championship (UFC) founder Dana White called Lee the "father of mixed martial arts" and stated: "If you look at the way Bruce Lee trained, the way he fought, and many of the things he wrote, he said the perfect style was no style. You take a little something from everything. You take the good things from every different discipline, use what works, and you throw the rest away".

Lee was largely responsible for many people's decisions to take up martial arts. These include numerous fighters in combat sports who were inspired by Lee; boxing champion Sugar Ray Leonard said he perfected his jab by watching Lee, boxing champion Manny Pacquiao compared his fighting style to Lee, and UFC champion Conor McGregor has compared himself to Lee and said that he believes Lee would have been a champion in the UFC if he were to compete in the present day.

Lee inspired the foundation of American full-contact kickboxing tournaments by Joe Lewis and Benny Urquidez in the 1970s. American taekwondo pioneer Jhoon Goo Rhee learned from Lee what he calls the "accupunch", which he incorporated into American taekwondo. Rhee later coached heavyweight boxing champion Muhammad Ali and taught him the "accupunch", which Ali used to knockout Richard Dunn in 1975. According to heavyweight boxing champion Mike Tyson, "everyone wanted to be Bruce Lee" in the 1970s.

Former UFC Heavyweight Champion and Light Heavyweight Champion Jon Jones cited Lee as inspiration, with Jones known for frequently using the oblique kick to the knee, a technique that was popularized by Lee. Former UFC Middleweight Champion Anderson Silva has also cited Lee as an inspiration. Numerous other UFC fighters have cited Lee as their inspiration, with several referring to him as a "godfather" or "grandfather" of MMA.

=== Racial barriers and stereotypes ===
Lee is credited with helping to change the way Asians were presented in American films. He defied Asian stereotypes, such as the emasculated Asian male stereotype. His friend Amy Sanbo recalls that, "In a time when so many Asians were trying to convince themselves they were white, Bruce was so proud to be Chinese he was busting with it." In contrast to earlier stereotypes, which depicted Asian men as emasculated, childlike, coolies, or domestic servants, Lee demonstrated that Asian men could be "tough, strong and sexy" according to University of Michigan lecturer Hye Seung Chung. In turn, Lee's popularity inspired a new Asian stereotype, the martial artist.

In North America, his films initially played largely to black, Asian and Hispanic audiences. Within black communities, Lee's popularity was second only to heavyweight boxer Muhammad Ali in the 1970s. As Lee broke through to the mainstream, he became a rare non-white movie star in a Hollywood industry dominated by white actors at the time. According to rapper LL Cool J, Lee's films were the first time many non-white American children such as himself had seen a non-white action hero on the big screen in the 1970s.

=== Popular culture ===
Numerous entertainment and sports figures around the world have cited Lee as a major influence on their work, including martial arts actors such as Jackie Chan and Donnie Yen, actor-bodybuilder Arnold Schwarzenegger, actor-comedians such as Eddie Murphy and Eddie Griffin, actresses such as Olivia Munn and Dianne Doan, musicians such as Steve Aoki and Rohan Marley, rappers such as LL Cool J and Wu-Tang Clan leader RZA, bands such as Gorillaz, comedians such as W. Kamau Bell and Margaret Cho, basketball players Stephen Curry and Jamal Murray, skaters Tony Hawk and Christian Hosoi, and American football player Kyler Murray, among others.

Bruce Lee influenced several comic book writers, notably Marvel Comics founder Stan Lee, who considered Bruce Lee to be a superhero without a costume. Shortly after his death, Lee inspired the Marvel characters Shang-Chi (debuted 1973) and Iron Fist (debuted 1974) as well as the comic book series The Deadly Hands of Kung Fu (debuted 1974). According to Stan Lee, any character that has been a martial artist since then owes their origin to Bruce Lee in some form.

Bruce Lee was a formative influence on the development of breakdancing in the 1970s. Early breakdancing pioneers such as the Rock Steady Crew drew inspiration from kung fu moves, as performed by Lee, inspiring dance moves such as the windmill among other breaking moves.

In India, Lee's films had an influence on Hindi masala films. After the success of films such as Enter the Dragon in India, Deewaar (1975), and later Hindi films incorporated fight scenes inspired by 1970s Hong Kong martial arts films up until the 1990s. According to Indian film star Aamir Khan, when he was a child, "almost every house had a poster of Bruce Lee" in 1970s Bombay.

In Japan, the manga and anime franchises Fist of the North Star (1983–1988) and Dragon Ball (1984–1995) were inspired by Lee films such as Enter the Dragon. In turn, Fist of the North Star and especially Dragon Ball are credited with setting the trends for popular shōnen manga and anime from the 1980s onwards. Spike Spiegel, the protagonist from the 1998 anime Cowboy Bebop, is seen practicing Jeet Kune Do and quotes Lee.

Bruce Lee films such as Game of Death and Enter the Dragon were the foundation for video game genres such as beat 'em up action games and fighting games. The first beat 'em up game, Kung-Fu Master (1984), was based on Lee's Game of Death. The Street Fighter video game franchise (1987 debut) was inspired by Enter the Dragon, with the gameplay centered around an international fighting tournament, and each character having a unique combination of ethnicity, nationality and fighting style; Street Fighter went on to set the template for all fighting games that followed. Since then, nearly every major fighting game franchise has had a character based on Bruce Lee. In April 2014, Lee was named a featured character in the combat sports video game EA Sports UFC, and is playable in multiple weight classes.

In France, the Yamakasi cited the martial arts philosophy of Bruce Lee as an influence on their development of the parkour discipline in the 1990s, along with the acrobatics of Jackie Chan. The Yamakasi considered Lee to be the "unofficial president" of their group.

The Legend of Bruce Lee (2008), a Chinese television drama series based on the life of Bruce Lee, has been watched by over 400 million viewers in China, making it the most-watched Chinese television drama series of all time, as of 2017.

In November 2022, it was announced that Taiwanese filmmaker Ang Lee was directing a biopic on Bruce Lee. Ang Lee's son Mason Lee was cast to star in the movie, while Bruce Lee's daughter, Shannon Lee, is set to produce the film.

In 2024, there was a proposal to erect a statue of Bruce Lee in San Francisco. Lee's daughter is in favor, stating, "the Bay Area is a very rich and vital part of our legacy."

Bruce Lee appears in Hitman: World of Assassination in September 2025. Lee is reinvented as an agent in the game, assassinating opponents during a martial arts competition. The player's goal is to prevent enemies from getting in the way.

=== Tributes ===
Underworld pays tribute to Bruce Lee in their song "Bruce Lee" from their 1999 album Beaucoup Fish, a blend of rock, techno, and guitar riffs. According to DAFT FM, the lyrics can be interpreted as encouraging the idea of self-actualization and individuals to be true to themselves, thus paying tribute to Lee's philosophy of empowering oneself and living life to the fullest.

=== Commercials ===
Though Bruce Lee did not appear in commercials during his lifetime, his likeness and image have since appeared in hundreds of commercials around the world. Nokia launched an Internet-based campaign in 2008 with staged "documentary-looking" footage of Bruce Lee playing ping-pong with his nunchaku and also igniting matches as they are thrown toward him. The videos went viral on YouTube, creating confusion as some people believed them to be authentic footage.

== Honors ==
=== Awards ===
- 1972: Golden Horse Awards Special Technical Award
- 1972: Fist of Fury Special Jury Award
- 1994: Hong Kong Film Award for Lifetime Achievement
- 1999: Named by Time as one of the 100 most influential people of the 20th century
- 2004: Star of the Century Award
- 2013: The Asian Awards Founders Award

=== Official day ===
- May 17 is Bruce Lee Day in California.

=== Statues ===
- Statue of Bruce Lee (Los Angeles): unveiled June 15, 2013, Chinatown Central Plaza, Los Angeles, California
- Statue of Bruce Lee (Hong Kong): 2.5 m (8.2 ft) bronze statue of Lee was unveiled on November 27, 2005, on what would have been his 65th birthday.
- Statue of Bruce Lee (Mostar): The day before the Hong Kong statue was dedicated, the city of Mostar in Bosnia and Herzegovina unveiled its own 1.68 m (5.5 ft) bronze statue; supporters of the statue cited Lee as a unifying symbol against the ethnic divisions in the country, which had culminated in the 1992–95 Bosnian War.

=== Places ===
On January 6, 2009, it was announced that Lee's Hong Kong home (41 Cumberland Road, Kowloon, Hong Kong) would be preserved and transformed into a tourist site by Yu Pang-lin. Yu died in 2015 and this plan did not materialize. In 2018, Yu's grandson, Pang Chi-ping, said: "We will convert the mansion into a centre for Chinese studies next year, which provides courses like Mandarin and Chinese music for children."

== Books ==
- Chinese Gung-Fu: The Philosophical Art of Self Defense (Bruce Lee's first book) – 1963
- Tao of Jeet Kune Do (Published posthumously) – 1973
- Bruce Lee's Fighting Method (Published posthumously) – 1978

== See also ==
- Bruce Lee (comics)
- Bruce Lee Library – Books written by or about Bruce Lee
- Bruceploitation – Exploitation film subgenre focused on Bruce Lee
- Dragon: The Bruce Lee Story – 1993 film by Rob Cohen
- List of atheists in film, radio, television and theater
- List of stars on the Hollywood Walk of Fame – Bruce Lee at 6933 Hollywood Blvd
- Media about Bruce Lee
- The Legend of Bruce Lee – Chinese television series

== Works cited ==
- Bishop, James (2004). Bruce Lee: Dynamic Becoming. Carrollton, TX: Promethean Press. ISBN 978-0-9734054-0-8. OCLC 62249595.
- Bolelli, Daniele (2008). On the Warrior's Path, Second Edition: Philosophy, Fighting, and Martial Arts Mythology. Berkeley, Calif.: Blue Snake Books (North Atlantic Books). ISBN 978-1-58394-219-2. OCLC 321047750. Partial preview at Google Books.
- Campbell, Sid; Lee, Greglon (2006). Remembering the master : Bruce Lee, James Yimm Lee, and the creation of Jeet Kune Do. Berkeley, Calif.: Blue Snake Books/Frog, Ltd. ISBN 978-1-58394-148-5. OCLC 62348277. Partial preview at Google Books.
- Cheng, David (1993). Jeet Kune Do Basics: Everything You Need to Get Started in Jeet Kune Do – from Basic Footwork to Training and Tournaments. [United States]: Tuttle Publishing. ISBN 978-1-4629-0267-5. OCLC 1445328209. Partial preview at Google Books.
- Dennis, Felix; Atyeo, Don (1974). Bruce Lee, King of Kung-Fu. London: Wildwood House. ISBN 978-0-7045-0121-8. OCLC 1341744.
- Dorgan, Michael (July 1980). "Bruce Lee's Toughest Fight". Official Karate. Derby, CT: Charlton Publications. ISSN 0048-1505. OCLC 4085074. Archived from the original on October 18, 2018.
- Lee, Bruce (1975). Tao of Jeet Kune Do. Chicago: Black Belt Communications. ISBN 978-0-89750-253-5. OCLC 1302545972 – via Internet Archive.
- Lee, Linda (1975a). Bruce Lee: The Man Only I Knew. Warner Paperback Library. ISBN 978-0-446-78774-1. OCLC 1365631.
- Lee, Linda (1989). Vaughn, Jack; Lee, Mike (eds.). The Bruce Lee Story. Burbank, Calif.: Ohara Publications. ISBN 978-0-89750-121-7. OCLC 1301805494 – via Internet Archive.
- Little, John R. (2001). Bruce Lee: Artist of Life. Boston: Tuttle Pub. ISBN 978-1-4629-1790-7. OCLC 921999918. Partial preview at Google Books.
- Little, John R. (1996). The Warrior Within: The Philosophies of Bruce Lee to Better Understand the World around You and Achieve a Rewarding Life. New York: McGraw-Hill. ISBN 978-0-8092-3194-2. OCLC 156347843.
- Little, John R., ed. (1998). The Art of Expressing the Human Body. Boston: C.E. Tuttle Co. ISBN 978-1-4629-1789-1. OCLC 922001030. Partial preview at Google Books.
- Polly, Matthew (2018). Bruce Lee: A Life. New York, NY: Simon & Schuster. ISBN 978-1-5011-8764-3. OCLC 1251715769. Partial preview at Google Books.
- Rafiq, Fiaz (2020). Bruce Lee: The Life of a Legend. Foreword by Diana Lee Inosanto. United States: Birlinn Limited. ISBN 978-1-78885-330-9. OCLC 1445153108. Partial preview at Google Books.
- Sharif, Sulaiman (2009). 50 Martial Arts Myths. New York: New Media Entertainment, Ltd. ISBN 978-0-9677546-2-8. OCLC 694518471. Partial preview at Google Books.
- Thomas, Bruce (1994). Bruce Lee: Fighting Spirit: a Biography. Berkeley, California: Frog, Ltd. ISBN 978-1-883319-25-0. OCLC 1148010280.
- Vaughn, Jack; Lee, Mike, eds. (1986). The Legendary Bruce Lee. Burbank, Calif.: Ohara Publications. ISBN 978-0-89750-106-4. OCLC 1245297096 – via Internet Archive.
