= Jesse Glover =

American martial artist

- Born: October 15, 1935; Seattle, Washington
- Died: June 27, 2012 (aged 76); Seattle, Washington
- Style: Non-Classical Kung-Fu and Judo
- Teacher: Bruce Lee

Jesse Raymond Glover (October 15, 1935 – June 27, 2012) was an African-American martial artist. He was Bruce Lee's first student. He met Lee in 1959, as they both attended Edison Technical College and practiced judo with Lee. Glover was a champion judoka. The character Jerome Sprout in the 1993 film Dragon: The Bruce Lee Story was based on Glover.

Jesse started a Gung Fu class of his own and Leroy Garcia and James DeMile came along and assisted him, which was the first ever independent Jun Fan arts related class. Jesse Glover was not authorized to teach, though he did ask, but Bruce refused (Kung Fu Magazine, 1994, Jesse Glover interview).

Bruce Lee had his punching and closing speed measured with an electric timer at Glover's house. In the book "Bruce Lee - Between Wing Chun and JKD", Glover states, Lee could land a punch in around 5 hundredths of a second (0.05 second) from 3 feet away, and could close from 5 feet away in around 8 hundredths of a second (0.08 second). While Glover's own times from 3 feet were between 11 and 18 hundredths of a second (0.11 and 0.18 second). Closing from a distance like 5 feet they were in the low twenties (0.21–0.23).

He died of cancer in June 2012.

== Written works ==
- Bruce Lee: Between Wing Chun and Jeet Kune Do
- Bruce Lee's Non-Classical Gung Fu
- Non-Classical Gung Fu
