= List of public art in the Scottish Borders =

Map of Scotland with the Scottish Borders council area highlighted

This is a list of public art in Scottish Borders, one of the 32 local government council areas of Scotland. It borders the City of Edinburgh, Dumfries and Galloway, East Lothian, Midlothian, South Lanarkshire, West Lothian and, to the south, the English counties of Cumbria and Northumberland. This list applies only to works of public art on permanent display in an outdoor public space and does not, for example, include artworks in museums.

== Burnmouth ==
Image	Title / subject	Location and coordinates	Date	Artist / designer	Type	Material	Dimensions	Designation	Wikidata	Notes
	Widow and Bairns	The Harbour, Burnmouth	2007	Jill Watson	Sculpture	Bronze				Memorial to the Eyemouth Disaster

== Coldstream ==
Image	Title / subject	Location and coordinates	Date	Artist / designer	Type	Material	Dimensions	Designation	Wikidata	Notes
More images	Monument to Charles Albany Marjoribanks	Tweed Terrace, Coldstream	1832	Mr Currie of Darnick	Statue on Doric column	Stone		Category B	Q17848761	
	War memorial	High Street, Coldstream	1923	Sir George Washington Browne	Cenotaph with wall and plaques	Stone and bronze				
More images	Coldstream Guards Monument	Henderson Park, Coldstream	1968		Inscribed monolith	Stone				

== Cove ==
Image	Title / subject	Location and coordinates	Date	Artist / designer	Type	Material	Dimensions	Designation	Wikidata	Notes
	Widow and Bairns	Cove	2007	Jill Watson	Sculpture	Bronze				Memorial to the Eyemouth Disaster

== Duns ==
Image	Title / subject	Location and coordinates	Date	Artist / designer	Type	Material	Dimensions	Designation	Wikidata	Notes
	Mercat cross	Market Square, Duns	c. 1792		Column on pedestal	Sandstone		Category B		
	War memorial	Public Park, Duns	c. 1920s		Obelisk	Stone				
	Polish war memorial	Duns	1981		Cross on pillar and base	Polished granite				
	Wojtek the Bear	Market Square, Duns	2016		Sculpture	Fibreglass				

== Earlston ==
Image	Title / subject	Location and coordinates	Date	Artist / designer	Type	Material	Dimensions	Designation	Wikidata	Notes
	War memorial	Station Road, Earlston	1921	Thomas J Clapperton	Celtic cross on monolith with plaques	Granite and bronze	4.5m high			

== Eyemouth ==
Image	Title / subject	Location and coordinates	Date	Artist / designer	Type	Material	Dimensions	Designation	Wikidata	Notes
	1881 Eyemouth Disaster Memorial	Cemetery Gardens, Eyemouth			Pillar and pedestal	Stone				
	Willie Spears, (1812–1885)	Market Square, Eyemouth	c. 2006		Statue	Bronze				
	Widows and Bairns	Eyemouth	2007	Jill Watson	Sculpture	Bronze	5m long, 1.2m high			Memorial to the Eyemouth Disaster

== Galashiels ==
Image	Title / subject	Location and coordinates	Date	Artist / designer	Type	Material	Dimensions	Designation	Wikidata	Notes
More images	Robert Burns	Galashiels	1912	Francis William Doyle Jones	Bust on pedestal	Bronze and granite		Category C	Q56633763	
	War memorial	Burgh Chambers, Cornmill Square, Galashiels	1924	Robert Lorimer (architect)	Relief sculpture and plaques	Stone and bronze		Category B	Q17853842	Figure of Angel of Peace carved by David Sutherland
More images	Border Reivers	Cornmill Square, Galashiels	1925	Thomas J Clapperton	Equestrian statue on pedestal and steps	Bronze and stone		Category B	Q17853847	
More images	Walter Scott	Cornmill Square, Galashiels	1932	Thomas J Clapperton	Bust on pedestal with plaque	Bronze and granite		Category C	Q56633764	

== Hawick ==
Image	Title / subject	Location and coordinates	Date	Artist / designer	Type	Material	Dimensions	Designation	Wikidata	Notes
More images	Boer War memorial	Walton Lodge Park, Hawick	1903	William Birnie Rhind	Statue on pedestal	Stone		Category C	Q77781150	JN Scott and A Lorne Campbell, architects
	The Horse, 1514 Memorial	High Street, Hawick	1914	William Francis Beattie	Equestrian statue on pedestal	Bronze and stone		Category A	Q17571529	
More images	War memorial	Walton Lodge Park, Hawick	1921	James B Dunn and Alexander Leslie, sculptor	Cenotaph with statue	Stone and bronze	6.5m high	Category C	Q77781163	
More images	Jimmie Guthrie	Walton Lodge Park, Hawick	1939	Thomas J Clapperton	Statue on pedestal	Bronze and stone				
	James Thomson	Thomson Bridge, Hawick	2006	Bill Landles	Sculpture on pedestal	Bronze and stone				

== Jedburgh ==
Image	Title / subject	Location and coordinates	Date	Artist / designer	Type	Material	Dimensions	Designation	Wikidata	Notes
More images	War memorial	The Ramparts, Jedburgh	1921	James B Dunn	Cenotaph on platform	Sandstone		Category B	Q17837025	
	James Hutton's Unconformity	Lothian Park, Jedburgh		Max Nowell	Sculpture	Stone				

== Kelso ==
Image	Title / subject	Location and coordinates	Date	Artist / designer	Type	Material	Dimensions	Designation	Wikidata	Notes
More images	War memorial	Abbey Grounds, Kelso	1921	Robert Lorimer	Cross on platform with statue in niche	Stone		Category B	Q17844315	Statue of St George by Pilkington Jackson

== Melrose ==
Image	Title / subject	Location and coordinates	Date	Artist / designer	Type	Material	Dimensions	Designation	Wikidata	Notes
	War memorial	Melrose	1921		Cross on pedestal	Stone			Q17844315	

== Minto ==
Image	Title / subject	Location and coordinates	Date	Artist / designer	Type	Material	Dimensions	Designation	Wikidata	Notes
	War memorial	Parish Church, Minto	1925	Thomas J Clapperton	Statue on pedestal with plaques	Bronze and stone		Category B	Q17844315	

== Peebles ==
Image	Title / subject	Location and coordinates	Date	Artist / designer	Type	Material	Dimensions	Designation	Wikidata	Notes
More images	War memorial	Chambers Institute, Peebles	1922	BNH Orphoot	Domed canopy over plaques and cross	Sandstone		Category B	Q17845269	

== St. Abbs ==
Image	Title / subject	Location and coordinates	Date	Artist / designer	Type	Material	Dimensions	Designation	Wikidata	Notes
	Widow and Bairns	Coldingham Road, St Abbs	2007	Jill Watson	Sculpture	Bronze				Memorial to the Eyemouth Disaster

== Selkirk ==
Image	Title / subject	Location and coordinates	Date	Artist / designer	Type	Material	Dimensions	Designation	Wikidata	Notes
More images	Sir Walter Scott	Market Place, Selkirk	1839	Alexander Handyside Ritchie	Statue on tiered pedestal	Stone		Category B	Q17846770	
More images	Mungo Park	High Street, Selkirk	1859, plaques 1905	Andrew Currie and Thomas J Clapperton	Statue on pedestal with plaques & supporting figures	Stone and bronze		Category B	Q17846790	
More images	Battle of Flodden	High Street, Selkirk	1913	Thomas J Clapperton	Statue on pedestal	Bronze and granite		Category B	Q17846815	Statue depicts Fletcher, the only Selkirk man known to have survived the battle of Flodden in September 1513.
	War memorial	Ettrick Terrace, Selkirk	1922	Robert Lorimer	Pillar on platform with plaques and statues	Stone and bronze		Category A	Q17567896	Plaques by Thomas J Clapperton
	J. B. Selkirk (James Buchan Brown)	Selkirk	1931	Thomas J Clapperton	Plaque	Bronze		Category C	Q77771284	
