= Cultural depictions of Robert the Bruce =

King Robert I of Scotland, also known as Robert the Bruce has been depicted in literature and popular culture many times. This list includes some examples.

== Aircraft ==
The airline British Caledonian, named a McDonnell Douglas DC-10-30 (G-BHDI) after Robert the Bruce.

== Art ==
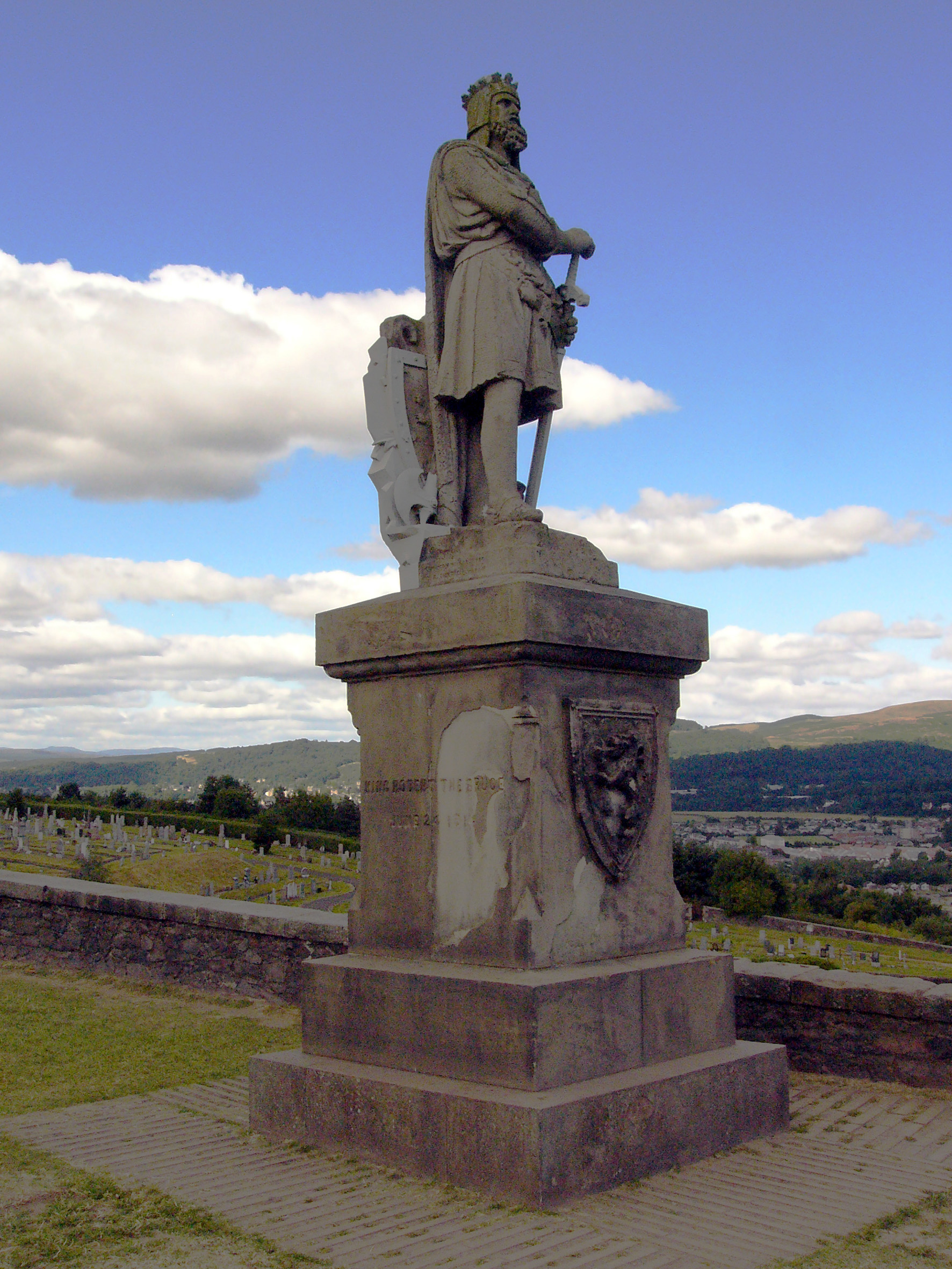
Bruce statue at Stirling Castle by Andrew Currie

- 1876: Statue by Andrew Currie on the esplanade at Stirling Castle.
- 1929: Statue by Thomas J. Clapperton at the entrance of the gatehouse, Edinburgh Castle.
- 1964: Statue by Charles d’Orville Pilkington Jackson at the Battle of Bannockburn Monument at Bannockburn.
- 1966: Replica of the statue by Charles d’Orville Pilkington Jackson on 14 Avenue NW, Calgary, Alberta, Canada.
- 2001: Statue of Bruce and Bernard de Linton by David Annand at Arbroath, Angus.
- 2010: Statue by Andrew Brown at Annan Town Hall, Annan, Dumfries and Galloway.
- 2011: Statue by Alan Beattie Herriot on Broad Street, outside Marischal College, Aberdeen.

== Banknotes ==
From 1981 to 1989, Robert the Bruce was portrayed on £1 notes issued by the Clydesdale Bank, one of the three Scottish banks with right to issue banknotes. He was shown on the obverse crowned in battle dress, surrounded by thistles, and on the reverse in full battle armour in a scene from the Battle of Bannockburn. When the Clydesdale Bank discontinued £1 banknotes, Robert The Bruce's portrait was moved onto the bank's £20 banknote in 1990 and it has remained there to date.

== Beer ==
Three Floyds Brewing, from the US-state of Indiana, makes a "mahogany-colored, malty ale with hints of chocolate and caramel" called Robert the Bruce Scottish Ale, according to medievalist and beer drinker Dr. Alex Kaufman.

== Books ==
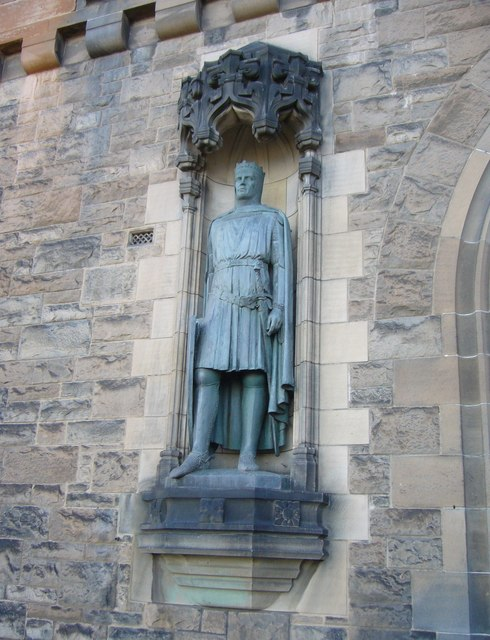
Bruce statue at the entrance to Edinburgh Castle

- 1865: In George MacDonald's novel Alec Forbes of Howglen, the character Annie Anderson is raised by her stingy relative Robert Bruce. Though he is no relation to this great figure of Scottish history, MacDonald's Robert Bruce constantly refers to the story of "his ancestor and the spider," even when it is totally irrelevant to the conversation at the moment.
- 1876: In Louisa May Alcott's novel Rose in Bloom, the main character Rose mentions that her family, the Campbells, are rather proud of being descended from Robert the Bruce.
- 1887: In Nellie Bly's Ten Days in a Mad-House she references the Bruce's night of watching the spider and her own attempts in staying awake.
- 1906: In Freedom's Cause by G. A. Henty, Robert the Bruce is the Scottish king.
- 1969 - 1971: Scottish author Nigel Tranter wrote a trilogy, considered largely accurate, based on the life of King Robert: The Steps to the Empty Throne, The Path of the Hero King and The Price of the King's Peace. This has been published in one volume as The Bruce Trilogy.
- 1998: The revolt of Robert the Bruce is the topic of Mollie Hunter's book The King's Swift Rider, written from the point of view of a bold young Scot and future monk who joins the rebellion as a noncombatant.
- 1998 - 2001: Katherine Kurtz and Deborah Turner Harris wrote a fantasy fiction series (The Temple and the Stone and The Temple and the Crown) linking Robert the Bruce with the Knights Templar.
- 2002 - 2006: Chronicles of the reign of Robert the Bruce (or Robert de Brus) are published in a series titled Rebel King, Hammer of the Scots (2002); Rebel King, The Har'ships (2004); and Rebel King, Bannok Burn (2006). Two more volumes are planned.
- 2009: The third volume of Jack Whyte's Templar Trilogy, Order in Chaos, is largely set in Scotland during the rise of The Bruce. It winds up its story just after the battle at Bannockburn. It covers a lot of the challenges and politics of that era.
- 2010: Robert the Bruce is the protagonist in English novelist Robyn Young's Insurrection trilogy, starting the novel Insurrection.
- 2010 - 2012: Romance writer Monica McCarty wrote a series of books (the Highland Guard Novels) about Robert the Bruce's legendary secret Islemen guard and Bruce's guerilla warfare tactics. Though Bruce is a minor character, his battles and the events surrounding his war against England are catalogued.
- 2012: Robert the Bruce and his brother Edward Bruce appear as characters in Irish writer Tim Hodkinson's novel, Lions of the Grail set during their invasion of Ireland.

== Comics ==
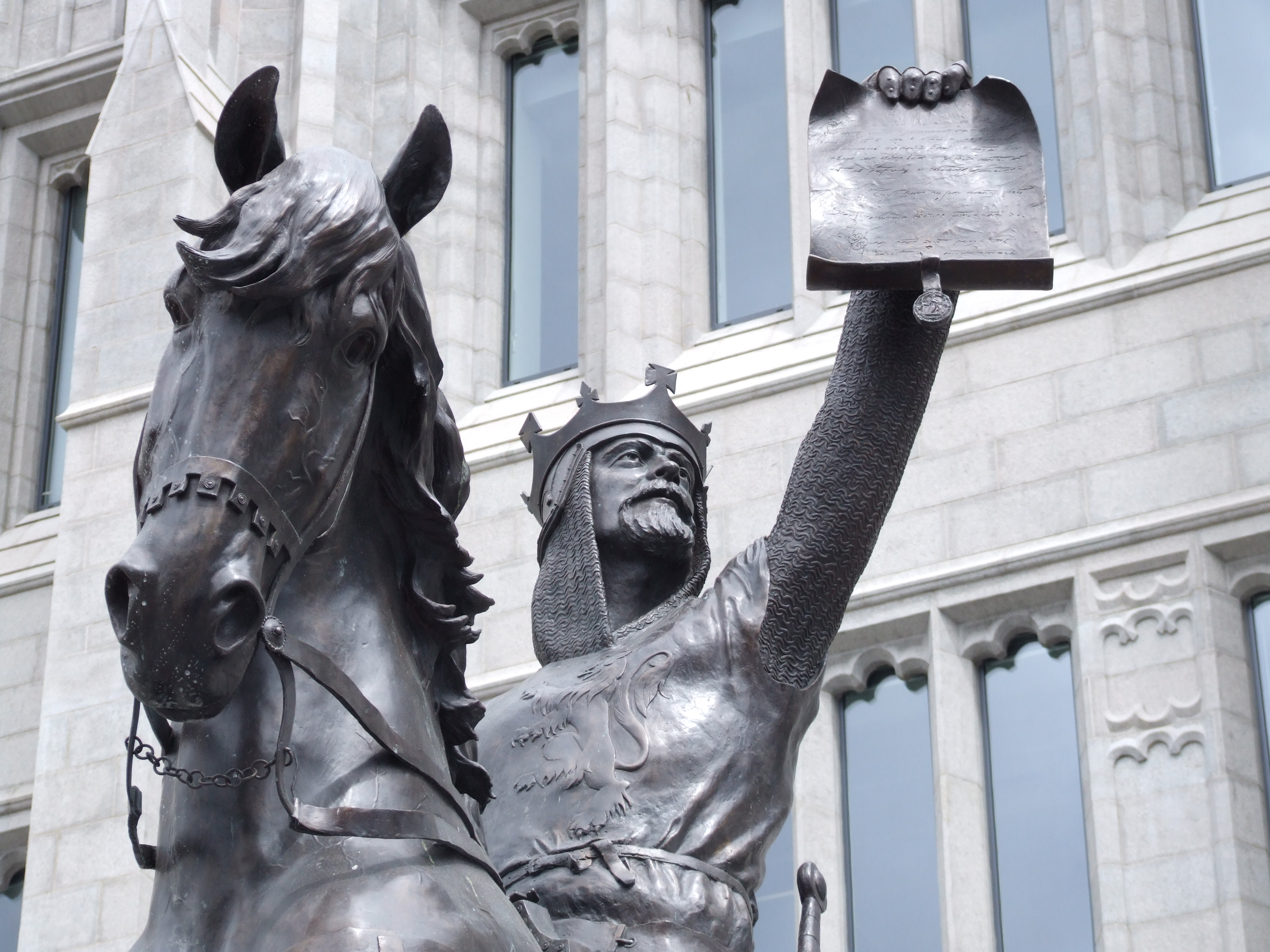
Statue of King Robert the Bruce in front of Marischal College.

- 1939: The names "Robert the Bruce" and "Mad Anthony Wayne" are the inspiration for "Bruce Wayne", the name for the civilian identity of DC Comics superhero Batman.
- 1987: In the Marvel comic New Mutants in fleeing the villain Magus, they flee to the time and place of Robert the Bruce.
- 2014: Portrayed in an independently produced comic written by Colin Maxwell and illustrated by Michael Philp.

== Films ==
- 1948: In the live-action Disney movie So Dear to My Heart, a cartoon sequence portrays Robert the Bruce's legendary encounter with the determined spider, as well as his subsequent victory. The sequence animates part of a song called 'stick-to-it-ivity' which is sung to teach the main character about the importance of perseverance in the face of adversity.
- 1995: In Braveheart, Robert the Bruce is portrayed by Scottish actor Angus Macfadyen. The film shows Robert taking the field at Falkirk, per Fordun's chronicle, as part of the English army; in fact, he never betrayed William Wallace (despite having changed sides). Wallace is also alleged to have been a complete supporter of Robert the Bruce, but Wallace was a supporter of the House of Balliol's claim to the throne which Bruce opposed.
- 1996: The Bruce, Robert the Bruce was portrayed by Sandy Welch.
- 2018: Outlaw King, a Scottish historical action drama film starring Chris Pine.
- 2019: Robert the Bruce, a Scottish historical drama depicting his time in the wilderness. King Robert the Bruce is played again by Angus MacFadyen, reprising his role from Braveheart.

== Music ==
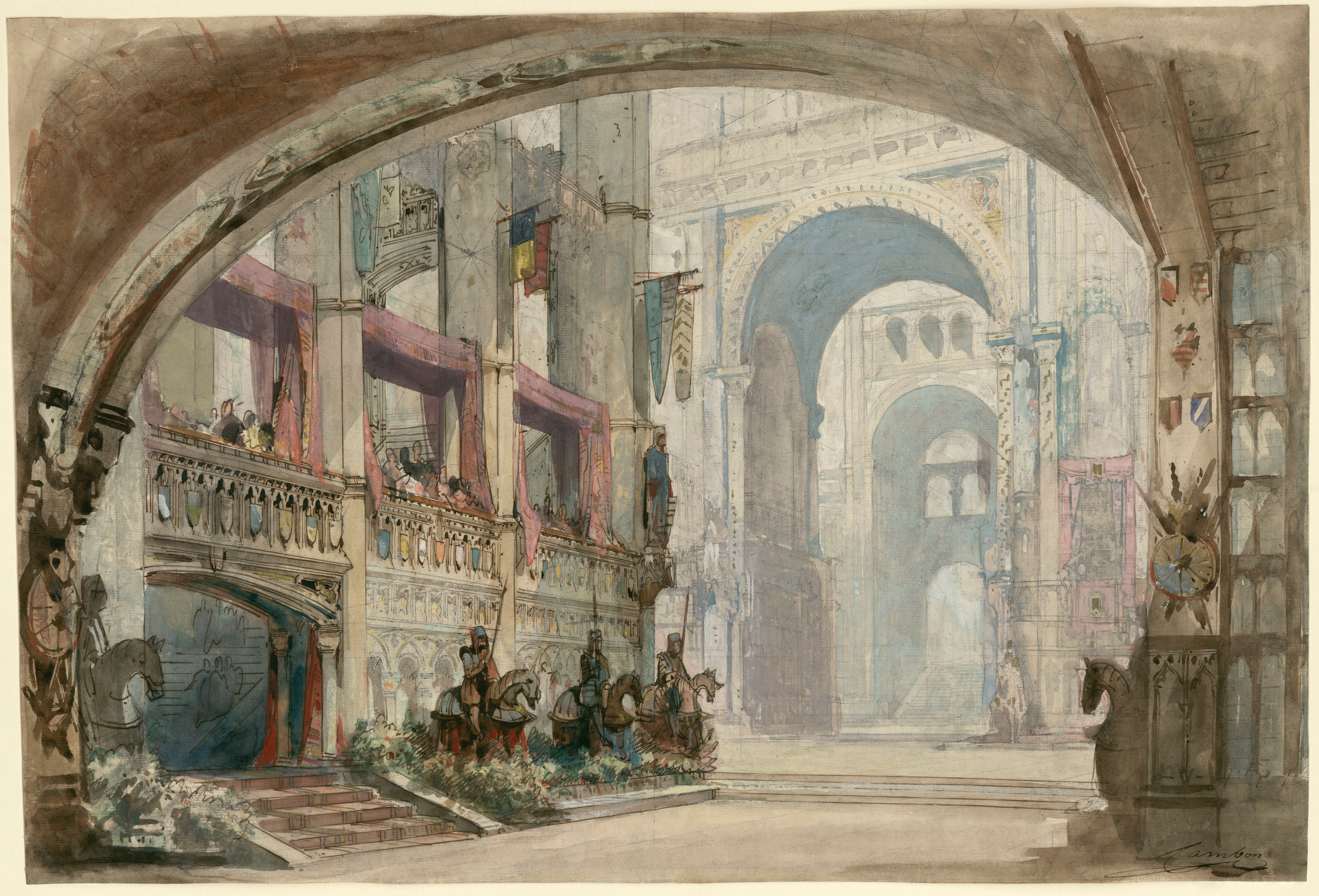
Set design for the original production of Gioacchino Rossini's Robert Bruce (1847)

- Robert Burns set his poem Scots Wha Hae, the words of which were originally stated to be taken from Bruce's address to his troops at the Battle of Bannockburn, to an old Scots tune, Hey Tuttie Tatie. As a military march, Marche des soldats de Robert Bruce, this tune is part of the repertoire of the French military.
- 14th century: A military song entitled "La marche des soldats de Robert Bruce" (march of the soldiers of Robert Bruce) is still played in France nowadays, for instance during the Bastille Day military parade.
- 1847: Robert Bruce, a pasticcio opera by Gioacchino Rossini
- 1968: The Corries song "Flower of Scotland" is a tribute to Robert Bruce. It has become a de facto Scottish national anthem used at international sport events.
- 1996: The German power metal band Grave Digger included a song called "The Bruce" on their album Tunes of War, a concept album about the Scottish struggles for independence from England.

== Video games ==
Robert the Bruce leads Scotland in Sid Meier's Civilization VI: Rise and Fall expansion, released on February 8, 2018.
