= List of public art in Stirling =

Map of Scotland with the Stirling council area highlighted

This is a list of public art in Stirling, Scotland, and includes works in the Stirling council area. This list applies only to works of public art on permanent display in an outdoor public space and does not, for example, include artworks in museums.

== Abbey Craig ==
| Image | Title / subject | Location and coordinates | Date | Artist / designer | Type | Material | Dimensions | Designation | Wikidata | Notes |
|---|---|---|---|---|---|---|---|---|---|---|
| | William Wallace | The Wallace Monument, Abbey Craig | 1869 | David Watson Stevenson | Wall-mounted statue | Bronze | | Category A | | |

== Bannockburn ==
| Image | Title / subject | Location and coordinates | Date | Artist / designer | Type | Material | Dimensions | Designation | Wikidata | Notes |
|---|---|---|---|---|---|---|---|---|---|---|
| More images | Statue of Robert the Bruce | Bannockburn | 1964 | Pilkington Jackson | Statue on pedestal | Bronze and granite | | Category A | Q17568248 | |

== Balmaha ==
| Image | Title / subject | Location and coordinates | Date | Artist / designer | Type | Material | Dimensions | Designation | Wikidata | Notes |
|---|---|---|---|---|---|---|---|---|---|---|
| More images | Tom Weir | Balmaha | 2014 | Sean Hedges-Quinn | Statue | Bronze | | | | |

== Bridge of Allan ==
| Image | Title / subject | Location and coordinates | Date | Artist / designer | Type | Material | Dimensions | Designation | Wikidata | Notes |
|---|---|---|---|---|---|---|---|---|---|---|
| | War memorial | Pullar Memorial Park, Bridge of Allan | 1923 | John Stewart (architect) | Cenotaph | Stone | | | | |

== Doune ==
| Image | Title / subject | Location and coordinates | Date | Artist / designer | Type | Material | Dimensions | Designation | Wikidata | Notes |
|---|---|---|---|---|---|---|---|---|---|---|
| | Mercat cross | Doune | c.1620 | | Shaft on steps | | | Category A | | |
| | War memorial | George St., Doune | 1922 | | Pillar on pedestal | Stone | | | | |
| More images | David Stirling and the Special Air Service Regiment | Doune | 2002 | Angela Conner | Statue on pedestal | Bronze and stone | | | | |

== Dunblane ==
| Image | Title / subject | Location and coordinates | Date | Artist / designer | Type | Material | Dimensions | Designation | Wikidata | Notes |
|---|---|---|---|---|---|---|---|---|---|---|
| | War memorial | The Haugh, beside Allan Water, Dunblane Cathedral | 1921 | | Cenotaph | | | | | |

== Sheriffmuir ==
| Image | Title / subject | Location and coordinates | Date | Artist / designer | Type | Material | Dimensions | Designation | Wikidata | Notes |
|---|---|---|---|---|---|---|---|---|---|---|
| More images | Clan MacRae Memorial | Sheriffmuir, 2 miles east of Dunblane | 1915 | | Concave cairn | Stone | | Category B | Q17837835 | |
| | Battle of Sheriffmuir memorial | Sheriffmuir, 2 miles east of Dunblane | | | Cylindrical cairn with plaque | Stone | | | | |

== Stirling ==
| Image | Title / subject | Location and coordinates | Date | Artist / designer | Type | Material | Dimensions | Designation | Wikidata | Notes |
|---|---|---|---|---|---|---|---|---|---|---|
| More images | Wigtown Martyrs monument | Old Town Cemetery, Stirling | 1859 | Alexander Handyside Ritchie | Statue group | Marble | | | | Glass cupola by John Rochead added in 1867. |
| More images | Statue of Henry Campbell-Bannerman | Corn Exchange Road, Stirling | 1913 | Paul Raphael Montford | Statue on pedestal | Granite | | Category B | Q17842911 | |
| | Robert Burns | Dumbarton Road, Stirling | 1914 | Albert Hodge | Statue on pedestal with plaques | Bronze and stone | | | | |
| | Rob Roy | Stirling | | | | | | | | |
| | War memorial | Corn Exchange Road, Stirling | 1949 | George R Davidson | Column | | 7.3m high | | | |

=== Stirling Castle ===
| Image | Title / subject | Location and coordinates | Date | Artist / designer | Type | Material | Dimensions | Designation | Wikidata | Notes |
|---|---|---|---|---|---|---|---|---|---|---|
| More images | Boer War Memorial | Stirling Castle | 1907 | Hubert Paton | Statue on pedestal | Bronze and granite | | Category C | Q56646416 | |
| More images | Statue of Robert the Bruce | Stirling Castle | 1877 | George Cruikshank (designer), Andrew Currie (sculptor). | Statue on pedestal | Stone with metal elements | | Category C | | |
| | James V | Stirling Castle | | | Statue in niche | Stone | | | | |

== Strathblane ==
| Image | Title / subject | Location and coordinates | Date | Artist / designer | Type | Material | Dimensions | Designation | Wikidata | Notes |
|---|---|---|---|---|---|---|---|---|---|---|
| | War memorial | Glasgow Road, Strathblane | 1921 | | Cross on pedestal and steps | Stone | | | | |

== Thornhill ==
| Image | Title / subject | Location and coordinates | Date | Artist / designer | Type | Material | Dimensions | Designation | Wikidata | Notes |
|---|---|---|---|---|---|---|---|---|---|---|
| | War memorial | Thornhill | 1920 | | Cross on cenotaph | Stone | | | | |
