= Hume Nisbet =

Scottish-born novelist and painter

James Hume Nisbet (8 August 1849 – 4 June 1923) was a Scottish-born novelist and artist. Many of his thrillers are set in Australia.

== Youth ==
Nisbet was born in Stirling, Scotland, and received special artistic training, and was educated under the Rev. Dr. Culross (later of Bristol College) up to the age of fifteen.

He moved to Australia at sixteen and spent about seven years there, during which time he travelled to Tasmania, New Zealand, and the South Sea Islands, painting, sketching, writing poetry and stories, and making notes for future work. He spent one year of the period acquiring theatrical experience at the Theatre Royal, Melbourne, under the actor Richard Stewart.

== Painting ==
Nisbet returned to London in 1872, and spent some time in studying and copying pictures in the National Gallery and in South Kensington. At the end of the next year he went back to Scotland and devoted himself to art, with an occasional lapse into literature. For eight years he was art master of the Watt Institution and School of Art, Edinburgh. He speaks with bitterness about his lack of success as a painter in a volume called Where Art Begins, which he published in 1892.

Among his best-known paintings are "Eve's first Moonrise," "The Flying Dutchman," "The Dream of Sardanapalus," four pictures of "The Ancient Mariner," and "The Battle of Dunbar."

== Writing ==
Nisbet produced a large volume of writing. Many of Nisbet's volumes were of ghost stories. These include Paths of the Dead (1899), Stories Weird and Wonderful (1900), and The Haunted Station (1894) whose title story (about a haunted property or "station" in the Australian Outback) has often been reprinted.

Nisbet was a member of the Yorick Club, London, and a friend of Philip Mennell. He was the father of painter and illustrator Noel Laura Nisbet, known for her works inspired by fairy tales, legends, and allegorical themes. Nisbet died in Eastbourne, Sussex, England, on 4 June 1923.

== Bibliography ==
=== Novels ===
- The Land of the Hibiscus Blossom: A Yarn of the Papuan Gulf (1888)
- Doctor Bernard St. Vincent: A Sensational Romance of Sydney (1889)
- Ashes: A Tale of Two Spheres (1890)
- Bail Up!: A Romance of Bushrangers and Blacks (1890)
- The Black Drop (1891)
- The Savage Queen: A Romance of the Natives of Van Dieman's [sic] Land (1891)
- The "Jolly Roger". A Story of Sea Heroes and Pirates (1891)
- The Bushranger's Sweetheart : An Australian Romance (1892)
- The Divers: A Romance of Oceania (1892)
- Valdmer the Viking: A Romance of the Eleventh Century by Sea and Land (1893)
- The Queen's Desire (1893)
- A Bush Girl's Romance (1894)
- The Demon Spell (1894)
- A Desert Bride (1894)
- Her Loving Slave. A Romance of Sedgemoor (1894)
- The Great Secret: A Tale of To-morrow (1895)
- The Rebel Chief: A Romance of New Zealand (1896)
- My Love Noel (1896)
- The Swampers: A Romance of the Westralian Goldfields (1897)
- A Sweet Sinner (1897)
- In Sheep's Clothing: A Romance of Upper Queensland (1900)
- Children of Hermes: A Romance of Love and Crime (1901)
- A Losing Game: An Australian Tragedy (1901)
- A Dream of Freedom: Romance of South America (1902)
- A Colonial King (1905)

=== Collected works ===
- The Haunted Station and Other Stories (1894)
- Stories Weird and Wonderful (1900)
- Mistletoe Manor (1902)
