= Equestrian statue of Robert the Bruce, Bannockburn =

Statue in Scotland

Equestrian statue of Robert the Bruce
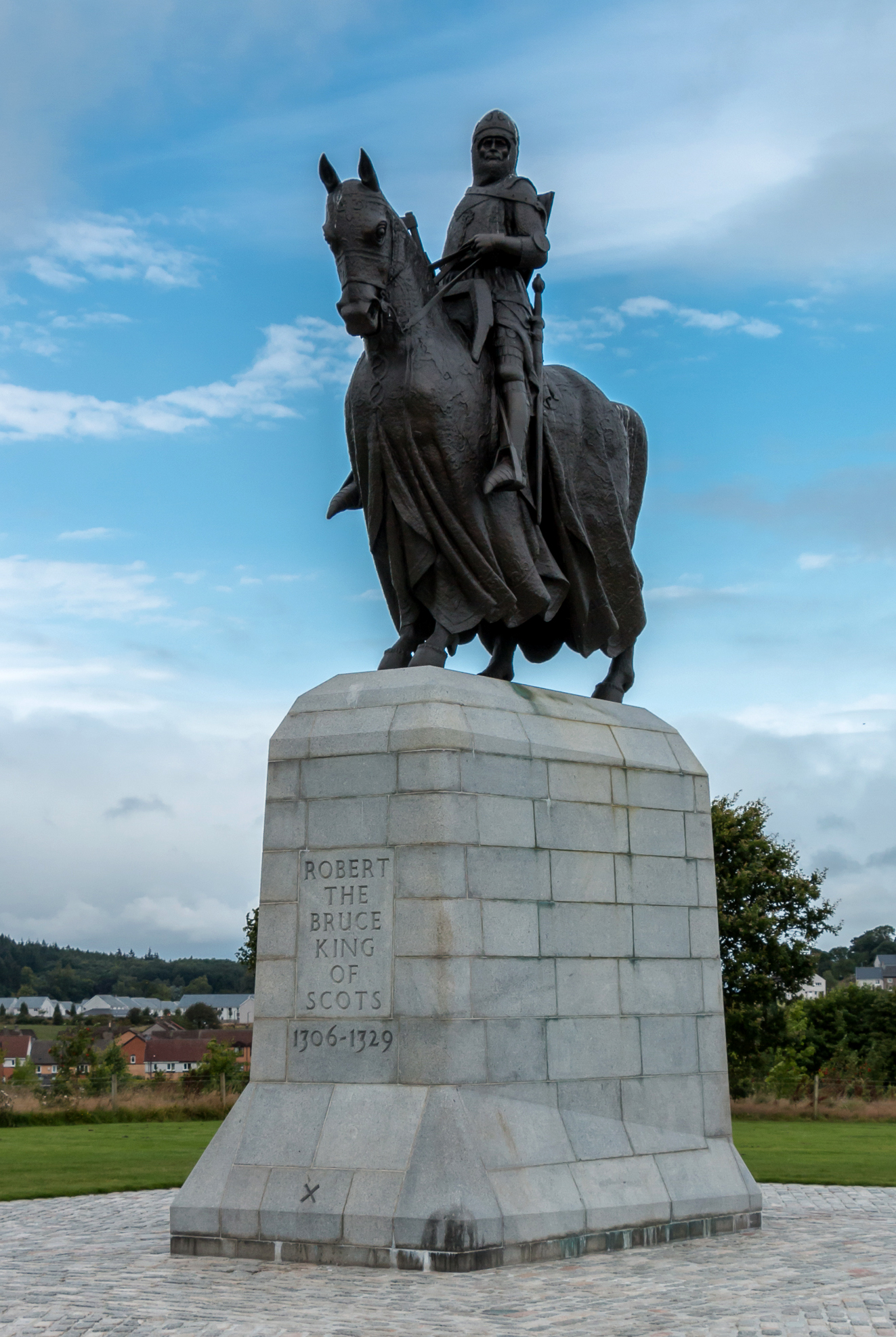
- The statue in 2014
- Artist: Pilkington Jackson
- Year: 1964
- Medium: Bronze sculpture
- Location: Bannockburn; 56°05′38″N 3°56′19″W

The equestrian statue of Robert the Bruce at the Bannockburn Visitor Centre, Bannockburn, Stirling, is a 1964 work by Pilkington Jackson.

== Description ==
The bronze sculpture depicts Robert the Bruce wielding an axe and on a war horse. The statue stands on a plinth that bears the inscription "ROBERT THE BRUCE KING OF SCOTS 1306–1329". It is located near the site of the Battle of Bannockburn. The statue is a A listed building.

== History ==
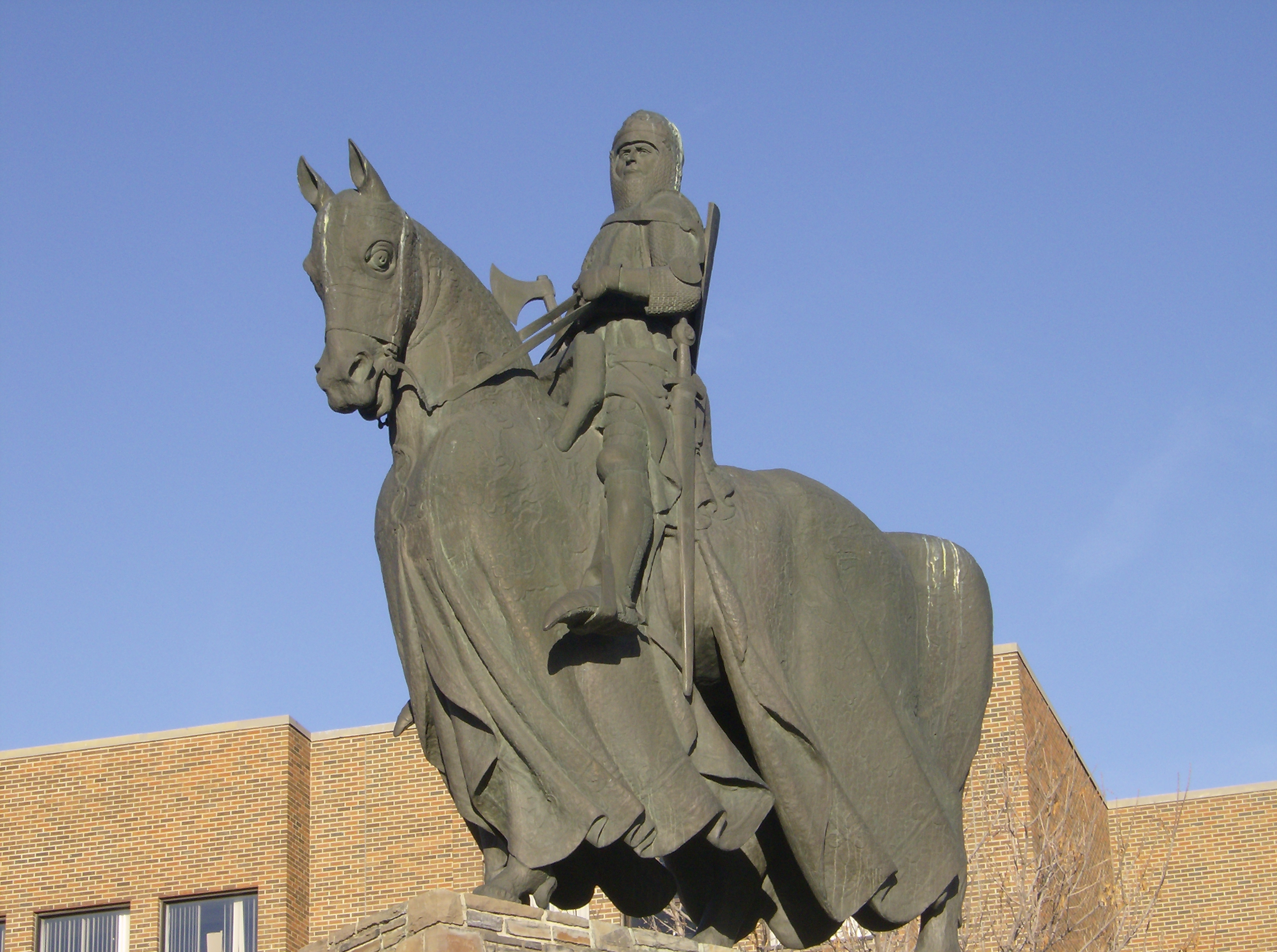
Replica statue in Calgary

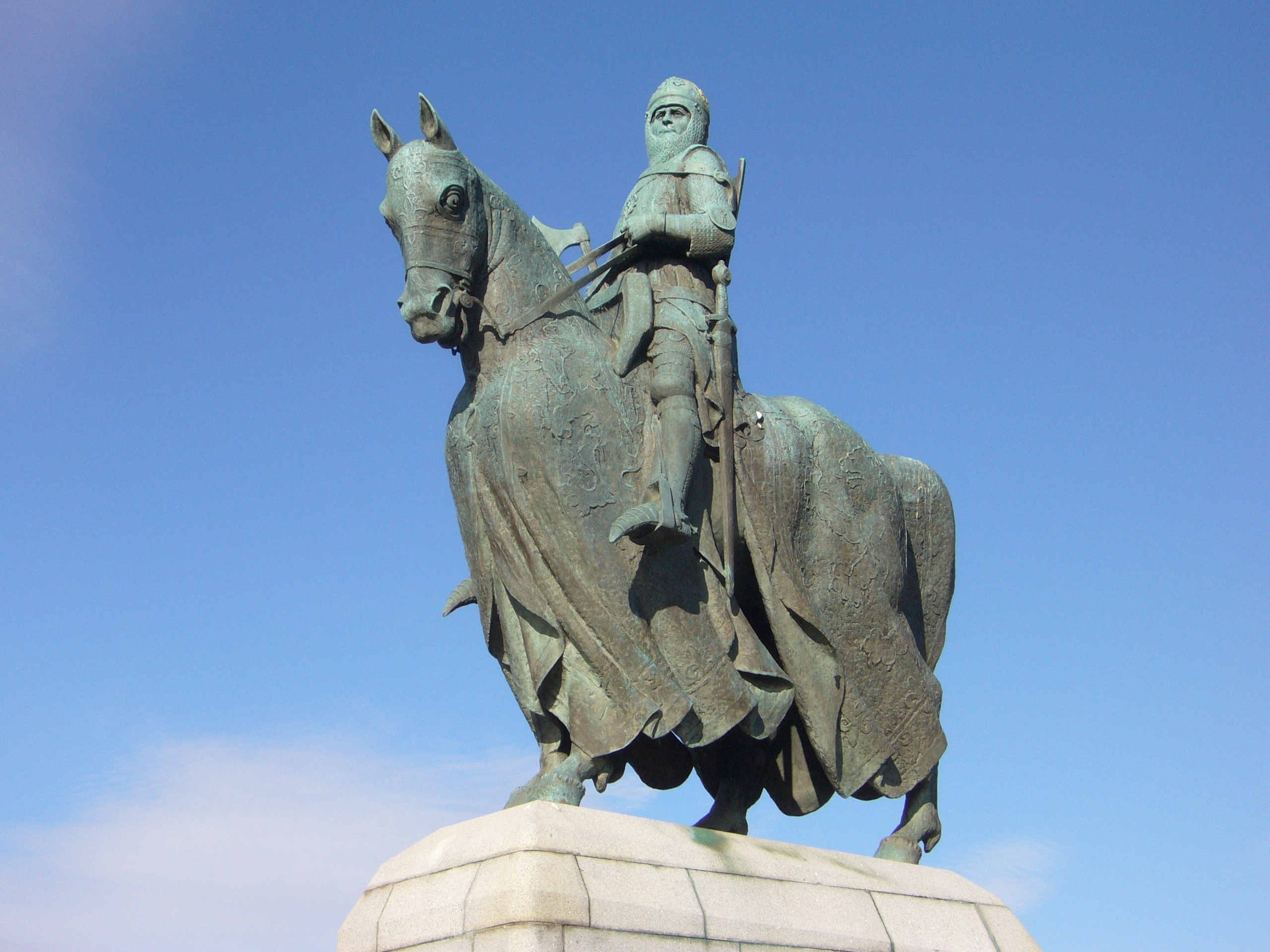
Statue pre-restoration, 2008

The statue was commissioned by the Earl of Elgin in 1964 to commemorate the 650th anniversary of the Battle of Bannockburn. It was sculpted by Pilkington Jackson using the measurements of Bruce's skull, re-discovered at Dunfermline Abbey in 1818, and cast in Cheltenham by H.H. Martyn & Co. The statue was unveiled by the Queen.

In 1966, a replica of the statue was placed outside the Alberta University of the Arts in Calgary, Alberta, Canada. The statue was funded by Canadian lawyer Eric Harvie.

From 2009 to 2020, the statue featured on the Clydesdale Bank £20 note.

In 2013, the statue was restored in preparation for the 700th anniversary of the Battle of Bannockburn in 2014. The statue which was cast in bronze was slowly turning green. Culture secretary Fiona Hyslop said "The Robert the Bruce statue is an iconic part of the Bannockburn site, and a poignant reminder of the battle".

On 11 June 2020, following the actions against memorials in Great Britain during the George Floyd protests, the statue was defaced with graffiti. The Scottish king was branded as a racist, despite not being involved in the slave trade. Stirling MP Alyn Smith said “I’ve been vocal in my support of #BlackLivesMatter and hope such counterproductive stupidity is an isolated incident.”

== See also ==
- Cultural depictions of Robert the Bruce
- List of public art in Stirling
- 1964 in art
