= Karantaba Tenda =

- Location in the Gambia
- Coordinates: 13°34′N 14°34′W
- Country: The Gambia
- Division: Central River Division
- District: Sami

Population (2009)
  - Total: 1,922 (est.)

Karantaba Tenda is a small town in north-eastern Gambia. It is located in Sami District in the Central River Division. As of 2009, it has an estimated population of 1922.

The village is near to the site of the historic British trading post Pisania.
