= A Natural History of the Dead =

Short story by Ernest Hemingway

- Short story by Ernest Hemingway
- Country: United States
- Language: English

Publication
- Published in: Winner Take Nothing
- Publication type: short story collection
- Publication date: 1932

"A Natural History of the Dead" is a short story by Ernest Hemingway. The story first appeared in Hemingway's 1932 novel Death in the Afternoon as the conclusion of Chapter 12. It was later included in the 1933 short story collection Winner Take Nothing.

The short story is influenced by Hemingway's time spent on the Italian Front during World War I as an ambulance driver with the Red Cross.

== Plot summary ==
The story parodies natural history by recounting events of WWI, specifically those involving death, the way a naturalist would examine nature. Naturalist Mungo Park is often referred to in that context. The story details the appearance of corpses on the battlefield, and includes several anecdotes regarding specific events and deaths. The final scene of the story involves a gravely injured man who is put among the dead while still alive, and the reactions of the men at the dressing post.
