= Thomas J. Clapperton =

Scottish sculptor

Thomas John Clapperton
- Born: 14 October 1879; Galashiels, Scotland
- Died: 15 February 1962 (aged 82); Upper Beeding, Sussex
- Education: Glasgow School of Art; Kennington School of Art; Royal Academy Schools
- Known for: Sculpture, public monuments

Thomas John Clapperton FRBS (14 October 1879 – 15 February 1962) was a Scottish sculptor, famous for the statue of Robert the Bruce at the entrance of Edinburgh Castle erected in 1929.

== Biography ==
Clapperton was born on 14 October 1879 in Galashiels in the Scottish Borders, the son of the photographer John William Clapperton. He studied at the Galashiels Mechanics Institute, then Glasgow School of Art from 1899 to 1901, then the Kennington School of Art in London and then the Royal Academy Schools in 1904 and 1905. In the latter he was student assistant to Sir Goscombe John. After further studies in Paris and Rome, he set up studios at Chelsea and St John's Wood, London, as a sculptor.

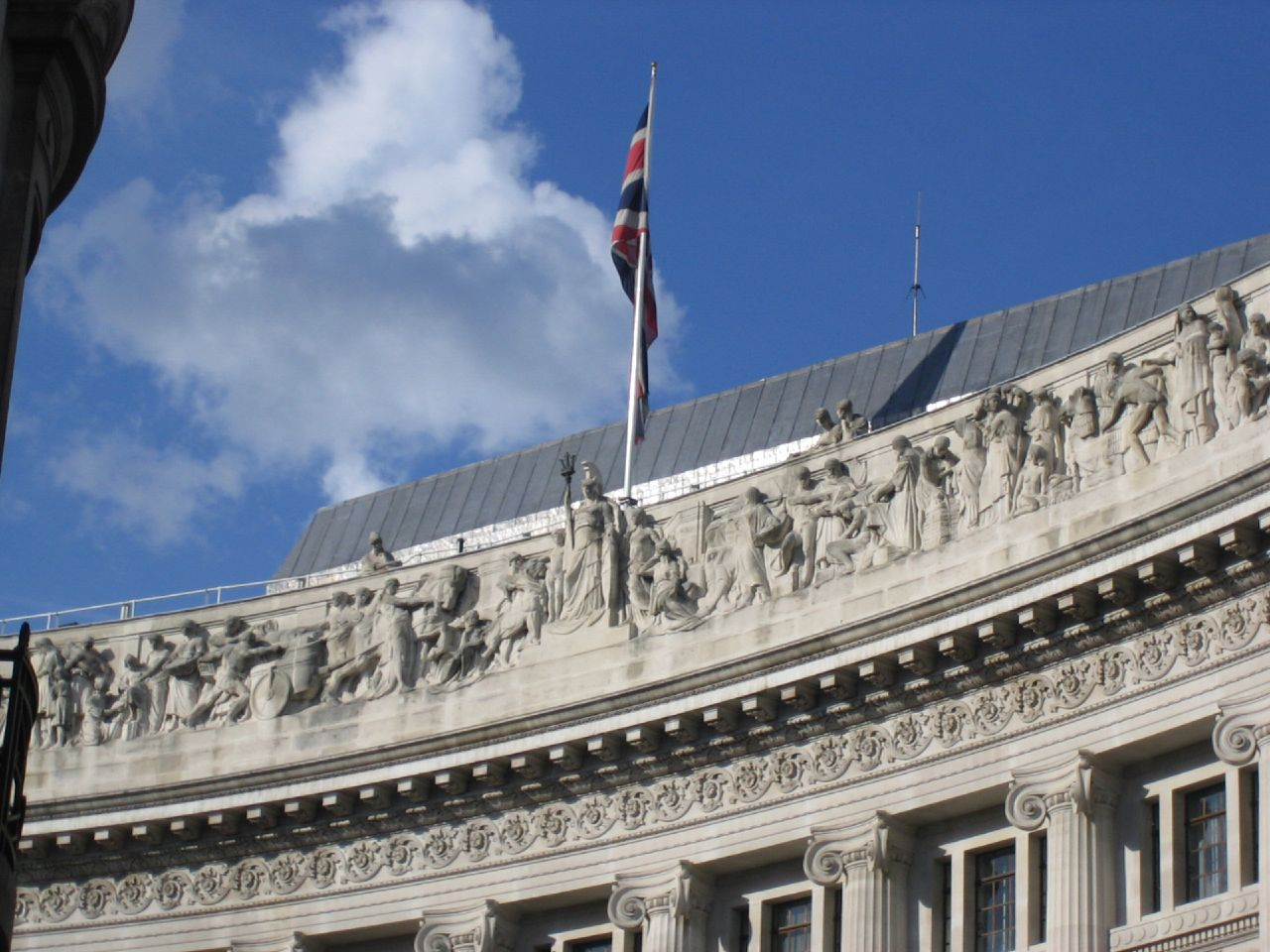
Frieze at 208–222 Regent Street, London

Although commissioned to design a monument to Mungo Park in Selkirk this was ultimately executed by the more experienced Andrew Currie. In the First World War he served in India. Clapperton's monuments are often of individual figures, rather than the large group war memorials of Goscombe John, under whom Clapperton had studied at the Royal Academy. In collaboration with C. L. J. Doman, he produced in 1926 the large frieze representing Britannia with the Wealth of East and West on the front of Liberty's department store in Regent Street, London. His work overseas includes a war memorial in New Zealand, a sculpture in Canada and a fountain in California.

In 1926, a bronze sculpture by Clapperton was commissioned by the mayor of Oamaru, Robert Milligan, for the Oamaru Botanic Gardens and was unveiled on 7 March 1927. Milligan was inspired by Sir George Frampton's 1913 Peter Pan statue in London's Kensington Gardens and wanted a similar sculpture for Oamaru. Milligan was referred to Clapperton since he had been a pupil of Frampton's. The sculpture is entitled 'Wonderland Statue' and was gifted by the mayor to his city. The work appears more ornate and intricate than the Peter Pan statue. It is reported that Harold Richmond so loved Clapperton's Wonderland Statue in the Oamaru Gardens as a child, that later as an adult he gifted two statues (sculpted by Cecil Thomas) to the Dunedin Botanic Garden. One statue is of Peter Pan, and the other is of Wendy and her brothers.

Clapperton was elected a Fellow of the Royal British Society of Sculptors in 1938. He died in Upper Beeding in Sussex on 15 February 1962.

== Public works ==
Image	Title / subject	Location and coordinates	Date	Type	Material	Dimensions	Designation	Wikidata	Notes
More images	Mungo Park	High Street, Selkirk, Scottish Borders	1859, plaques 1905	Plaques & supporting figures on monument	Bronze		Category B	Q17846790	Monument by Andrew Currie
	Learning	Pinnacle of the Mitchell Library, Glasgow	1909	Statue	Bronze		Category B	Q1801309	
More images	Fletcher Statue, Battle of Flodden Memorial	High Street, Selkirk, Scottish Borders	1913	Statue on pedestal	Bronze and granite		Category B	Q17846815	
	Learning, Shipping & Mining	National Museum Cardiff	1914-15	3 Architectural sculptures	Stone				
	War memorial	Station Road, Earlston, Scottish Borders	1921	Celtic cross on monolith with plaques	Granite and bronze	4.5m high			
More images	War memorial	Canonbie, Dumfries and Galloway	1921	Statue on pedestal	Bronze and granite	4.0m high	Category C	Q56614881	
More images	Border Reivers	Cornmill Square, Galashiels, Scottish Borders	1925	Equestrian statue on pedestal and steps	Bronze and stone		Category B	Q17853847	
More images	War memorial	Parish Church, Minto, Scottish Borders	1925	Statue on pedestal with plaques	Bronze and stone		Category B	Q17844315	
More images	War memorial	Oamaru, New Zealand	1926	Cenotaph with sculpture group	Stone and bronze		Category II	Q76908436	
More images	Wonderland / Peter Pan	Public Gardens, Oamaru, New Zealand	1926	Sculpture group	Bronze		Category II	Q66360690	
More images	Robert the Bruce	The Gatehouse, Edinburgh Castle	1929	Statue in niche	Bronze				
	James Buchan Brown known as J. B. Selkirk	Selkirk, Scottish Borders	1931	Plaque	Bronze		Category C	Q77771284	
More images	Walter Scott	Cornmill Square, Galashiels, Scottish Borders	1932	Bust on pedestal with plaque	Bronze and granite		Category C	Q56633764	
More images	Jimmie Guthrie	Walton Lodge Park, Hawick, Scottish Borders	1939	Statue on pedestal	Bronze and stone				
	Memorial to the 49th West Riding Reconnaissance	Wakefield Cathedral	1947						
	Springtime or Peter Pan	Glasgow Green, Glasgow	1949	Sculpture	Bronze				
