= Pisania (trading post) =

Pisania was a settlement in The Gambia. It was visited by the British explorers Mungo Park and Daniel Houghton on their expeditions into the interior of Africa. It has since become the town of Karantaba Tenda.

== History ==
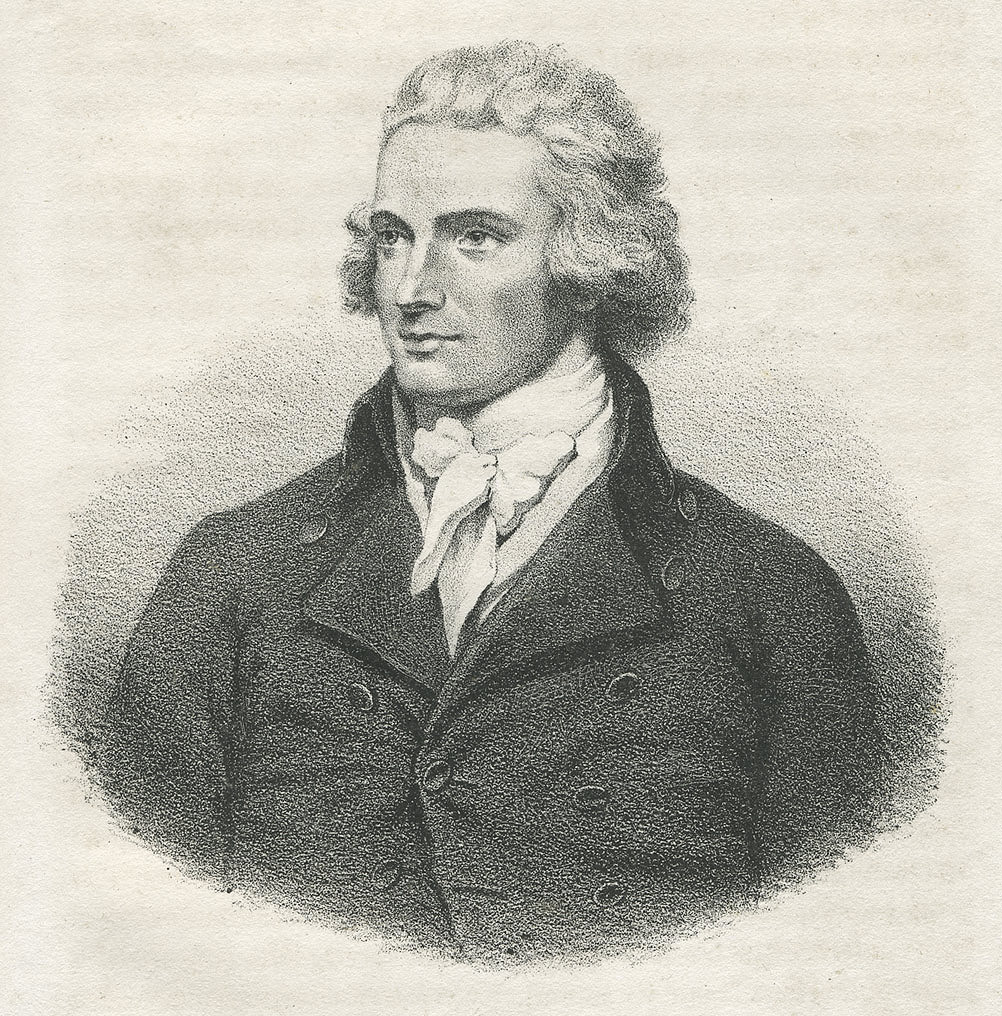
Mungo Park, who visited Pisania several times.

=== Foundation ===
In the late 18th century, British traders began independently establishing factories at settlements along the Gambia River. By 1786, a factory had been established north of MacCarthy Island, at a place named Pisania. This factory, and the surrounding settlement, were likely established by two brothers named Aynsley, one of whom, Robert, was likely captured by the French in 1779, but returned soon after. In 1791, the Aynsleys were joined by a surgeon named John Laidley.

=== Mungo Park ===
Mungo Park arrived in Pisania from Jufureh in July 1795. He was befriended by Laidley and stayed with him for six months. While in Pisania, he studied Mandinka and collected information on the neighbouring countries. He left Pisania on 1 December, but returned after his journey into the interior of Africa on 10 June 1797. Laidley had died earlier in the year in Barbados, while on his way home to England.

=== Abandonment ===
Robert Aynsley had a mixed-race son who had taken over the running of Pisania prior to 1818. He was forced to leave Pisania and travel to Tendaba as raids and conflict between kingdoms on the upper river became more prevalent. In his 1842 expedition, Governor Thomas Lewis Ingram passed by Pisania. He noted that the ruins of the factory were still visible from the river side, although at that point there were no inhabitants anymore.

== Sources ==
- Gray, J. M. (2015). A History of the Gambia. Cambridge: Cambridge University Press. ISBN 978-1-107-51196-5.
