= Statue of Robert the Bruce, Stirling Castle =

Statue in Scotland

Statue of Robert the Bruce
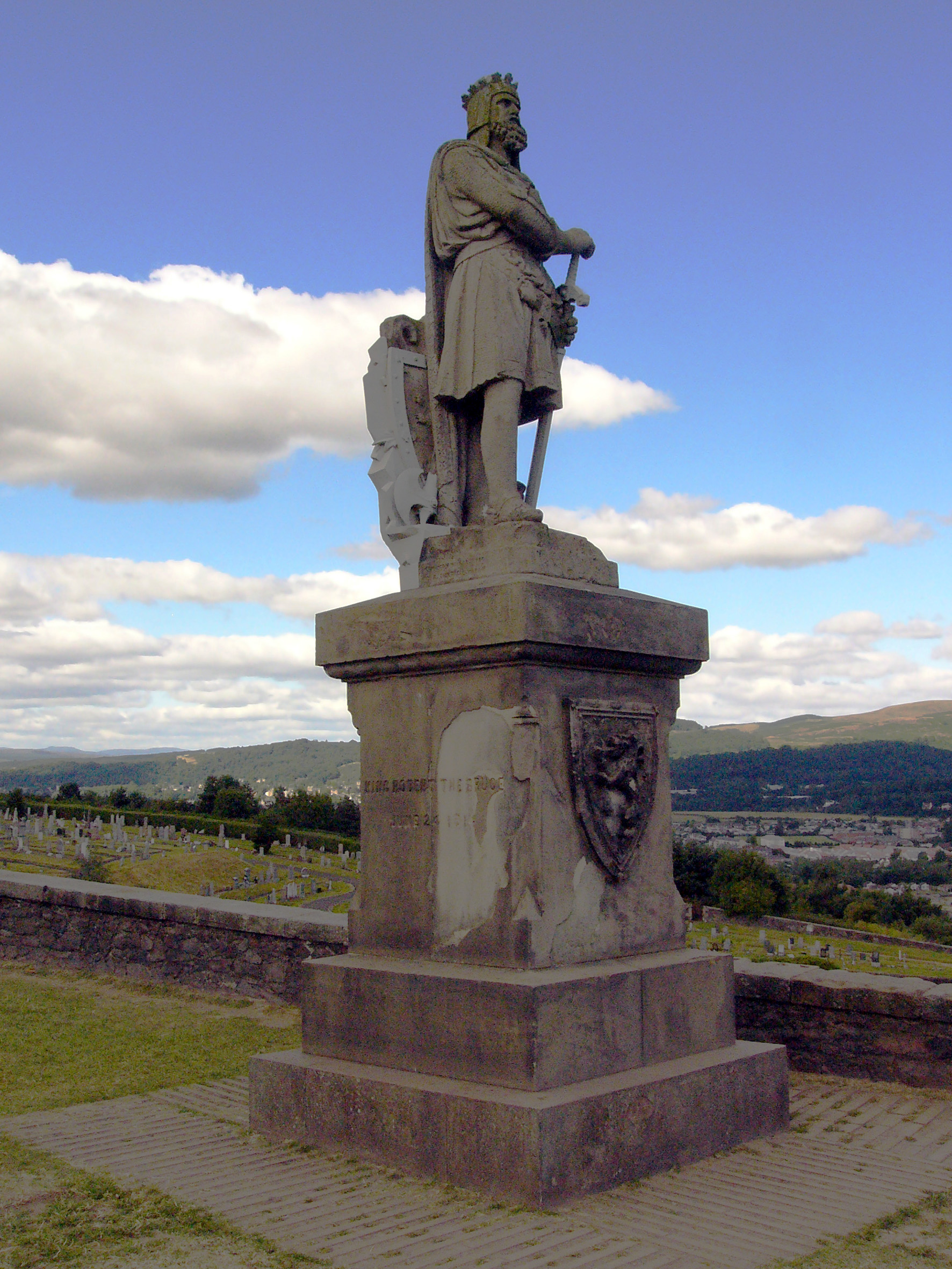
- The statue in 2005
- Artist: Andrew Currie
- Year: 1876
- Medium: Stone sculpture
- Location: Stirling; 56°07′23″N 3°56′45″W

The statue of Robert the Bruce on the esplanade at Stirling Castle, Stirling, is an 1876 work sculpted by Andrew Currie and designed by illustrator George Cruikshank. As of 2020, the statue is featured on the Clydesdale Bank £20 note.

== Description ==
The stone sculpture depicts Robert the Bruce in chain mail with his hand on the pommel of his sword. To the back side is his shield and axe. On the plinth is a shield with a lion rampant. The figure faces south, towards the location of the Battle of Bannockburn. The statue is a C listed building.

== See also ==
- Cultural depictions of Robert the Bruce
- List of public art in Stirling
- 1876 in art
