= Noel Laura Nisbet =

British painter (1887–1956)

- Born: 1887; Harrow, Middlesex, England
- Died: May 16, 1956; London, England
- Education: Clapham School of Art, Royal College of Art
- Known for: Painting, Illustration
- Movement: Pre-Raphaelite influence
- Awards: Three gold medals, Princess of Wales' Scholarship

Noel Laura Nisbet (1887 - May 16, 1956) was a British painter and illustrator known for her decorative and imaginative works often inspired by fairy tales, legends, and allegorical themes. She was sometimes referred to as "the last Pre-Raphaelite" due to the strong influence of the Pre-Raphaelite movement on her work. Nisbet's work can be found in several public collections, including the Russell-Cotes Art Gallery & Museum in Bournemouth and the Newport Museum and Art Gallery.

== Early life and education ==
Noel Ruth Laura Helen Nisbet was born in 1887 in Harrow, Middlesex. She was the youngest of six children born to Hume Nisbet (1849–1923), a painter, writer, and poet, and his first wife Helen, daughter of the Scottish sculptor Andrew Currie (1813–1891). Nisbet received her early education at the Convent of Notre Dame in Clapham Common. She then studied at the Clapham School of Art, where she won three gold medals, Bronze Medals, and a Princess of Wales Scholarship. She furthered her studies at the Royal College of Art, where she also won several awards.

== Career ==
Nisbet's artistic career began to flourish during World War I when she illustrated five books of fairy tales, legends, and stories from the classics. Her work was first exhibited at the Royal Academy in 1914, and she continued to exhibit there regularly until 1938, with a total of 24 works accepted over the years.

In 1926, Nisbet was elected to the Royal Institute of Watercolour Painters, and in 1945, she became a member of the British Watercolour Society. She exhibited extensively at various galleries, including the Walker Art Gallery in Liverpool, and in cities such as Glasgow, Bournemouth, Southport, Bristol, Brighton, and Derby.

Nisbet's work often featured romantic, medieval-inspired scenes, as well as allegorical and religious subjects. She was known for her three-stage method of producing large watercolours, which involved creating an advanced drawing, tracing it, and then transferring it to board for painting.

== Personal life ==
Nisbet married fellow artist Harry Bush (1883–1957). The couple lived in Merton Park, London, where they had two daughters, Hazel and Janet. In 1947, Nisbet suffered the first of several strokes that progressively incapacitated her. Despite this, she continued to work, even teaching herself to paint with her left hand when her right hand failed. Noel Laura Nisbet died on May 16, 1956.
