= Mungo Park (explorer) =

Scottish naturalist and explorer of the African continent (1771–1806)

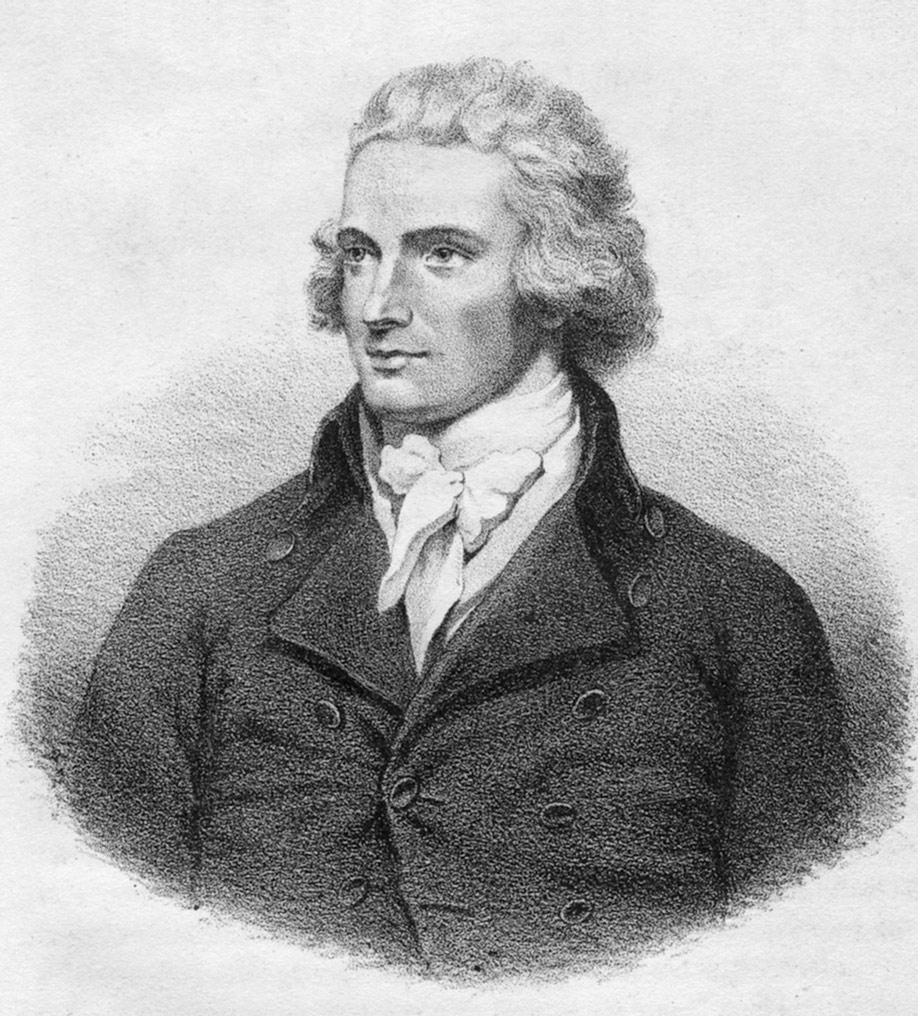
- Posthumous portrait (1859) by unknown artist
- Born: 10 September 1771; Yarrow, Selkirkshire, Scotland
- Died: 1806 (aged 35); Bussa, Nigeria
- Education: University of Edinburgh
- Known for: Exploration of West Africa
- Scientific career
- Fields: African explorer Surgeon's mate

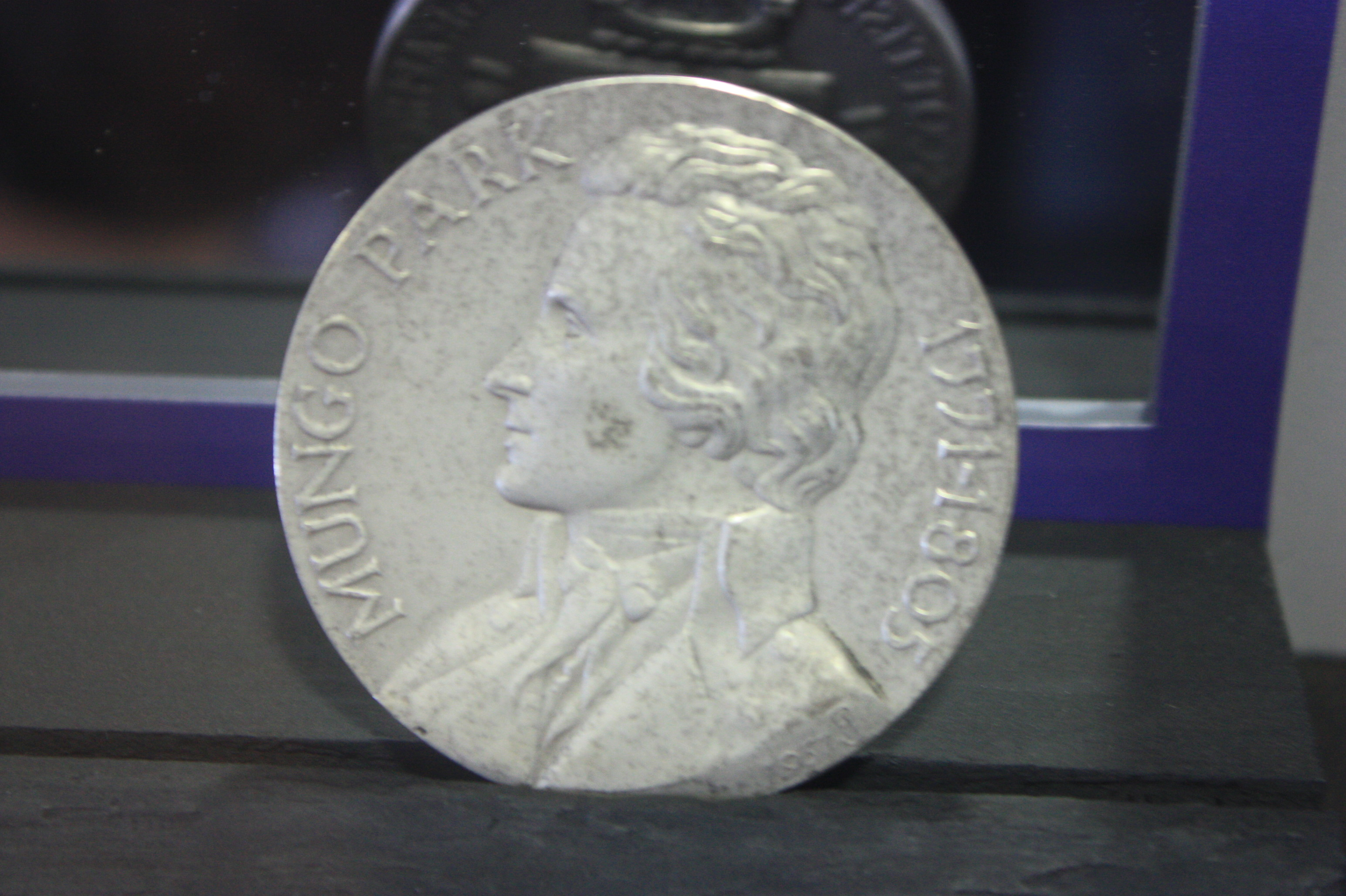
Mungo Park commemorative medal

Mungo Park (10 September 1771 – 1806) was a Scottish explorer known for his expeditions to West Africa, particularly along the Niger River. During his first expedition (1795–1797), undertaken on behalf of the African Association, he reached the Niger River and documented its eastward course. His account, Travels in the Interior Districts of Africa (1799), became widely read in Europe and contributed to European geographical knowledge of the region.

Park undertook a second expedition to the Niger in 1805. He died in 1806 near Bussa, Nigeria, in present-day Nigeria, while attempting to travel downstream along the river.

== Early life ==
Mungo Park was born 10 September 1771 in Selkirkshire, Scotland, at Foulshiels on the Yarrow Water, near Selkirk, on a tenant farm which his father, Mungo Park (1714–1793), rented from the Duke of Buccleuch. He was the seventh in a family of thirteen. Although tenant farmers, the Parks were relatively well-off. They were able to pay for Park to receive a good education, and Park's father died leaving property valued at £3,000 (equivalent to £217,000 in 2025). His parents had originally intended him for a ministry in the Church of Scotland.

He was educated at home before attending Selkirk grammar school. At the age of fourteen, he was apprenticed to Thomas Anderson, a surgeon in Selkirk. During his apprenticeship, Park became friends with Anderson's son Alexander and was introduced to Anderson's daughter Allison, who would later become his wife.

In October 1788, Park enrolled at the University of Edinburgh, attending for four sessions studying medicine and botany. Notably, during his time at university, he spent a year in the natural history course taught by Professor John Walker. After completing his studies, he spent a summer in the Scottish Highlands, engaged in botanical fieldwork with his brother-in-law, James Dickson, a gardener and seed merchant in Covent Garden. In 1788 Dickson along with Sir James Edward Smith and six other fellows founded the Linnean Society of London.

In 1792, Park completed his medical studies at University of Edinburgh. Through a recommendation by Joseph Banks he obtained the post of surgeon's mate on board the East India Company's ship Worcester. In February 1793 the Worcester sailed to Benkulen in Sumatra. Before departing, Park wrote to his friend Alexander Anderson in terms that reflect his Calvinist upbringing:

My hope is now approaching to a certainty. If I be deceived, may God alone put me right, for I would rather die in the delusion than wake to all the joys of earth. May the Holy Spirit dwell in your heart, my dear friend, and if I ever see my native land again, may I rather see the green sod on your grave than see you anything but a Christian.

— Lupton 1979, p. 14

On his return in 1794, Park gave a lecture to the Linnaean Society, describing eight new Sumatran fish. The paper was not published until three years later. He also presented Banks with various rare Sumatran plants.

== Travels into the interior of Africa ==
=== First journey ===
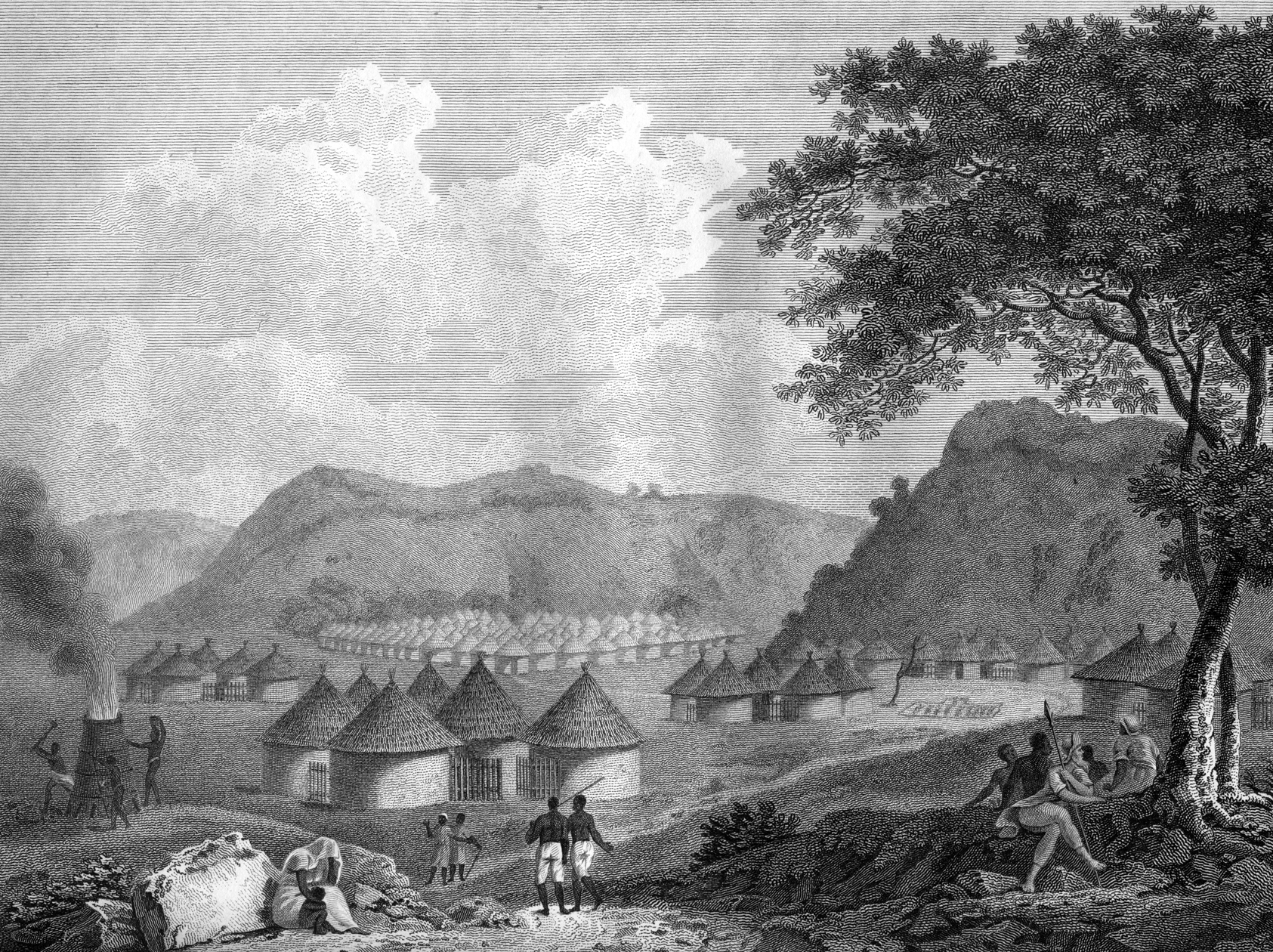
View of Kamalia in Mandingo country, Africa, from: Mungo Park, Travels in the Interior Districts of Africa

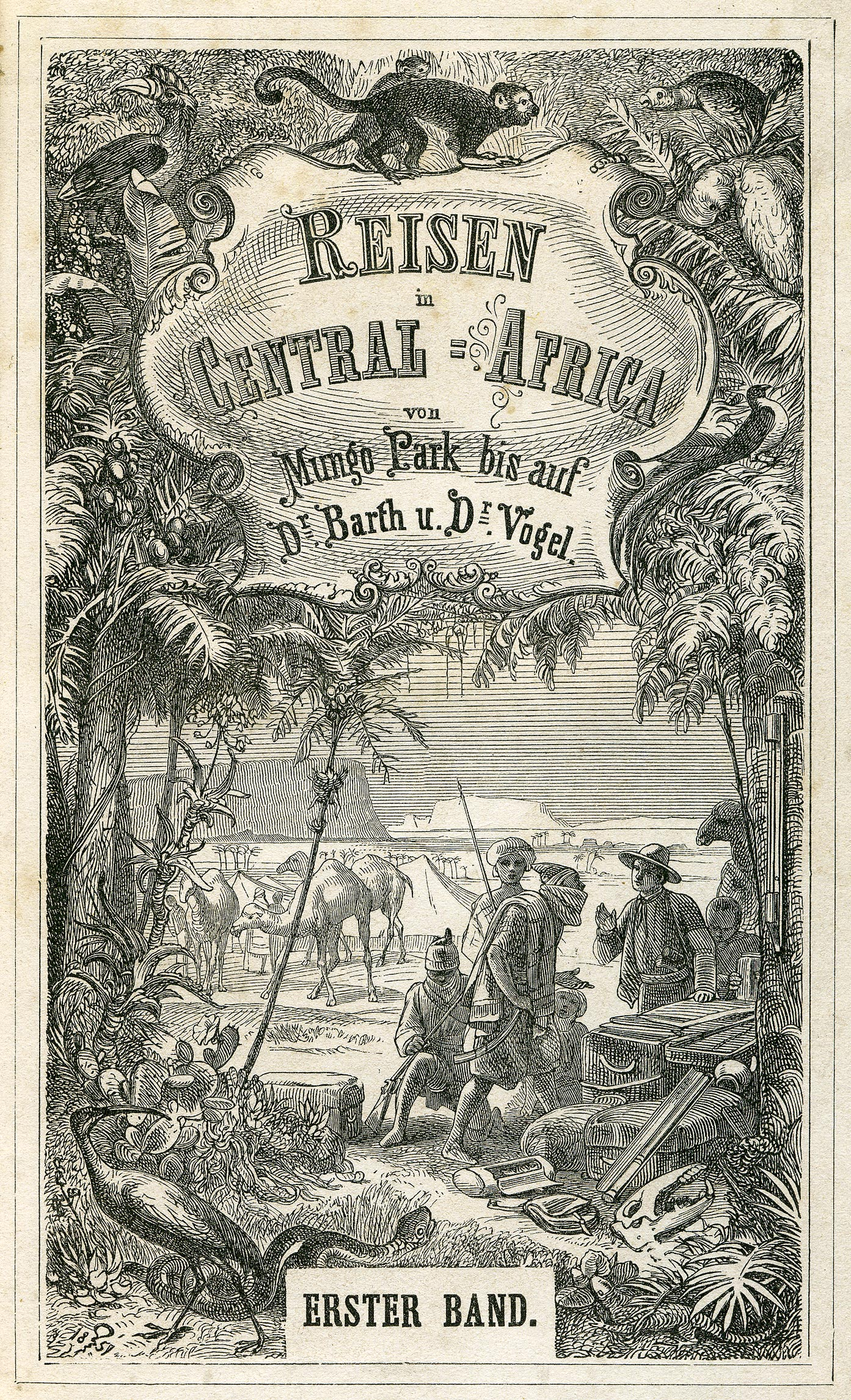
Park was one of the first European explorers of Central Africa, and was one of the first explorers mentioned in Reisen in Central-Afrika – von Mungo Park bis auf Dr. Barth u. Dr. Vogel (1859) (Travels in Central-Africa – from Mungo Park to Dr. Barth and Dr. Vogel)

On 26 September 1794, Mungo Park offered his services to the African Association, then looking for a successor to Major Daniel Houghton, who had been sent in 1790 to discover the course of the Niger River and had died in the Sahara, although his death was not confirmed for some years.Supported by Sir Joseph Banks, Park was selected.

On 22 May 1795, Park left Portsmouth, England, on the brig Endeavour, a vessel travelling to Gambia to trade for beeswax and ivory.

On 21 June 1795, he reached the Gambia River and ascended it 200 miles (300 km) to a British trading station named Pisania. On 2 December, accompanied by two local guides, he started for the unknown interior. He chose the route crossing the upper Senegal basin and through the semi-desert region of Kaarta. The journey was full of difficulties, and at Ludamar he was imprisoned by a Moorish chief for four months. On 1 July 1796, he escaped, alone and with nothing but his horse and a pocket compass, and on the 21st reached the long-sought Niger River at Ségou, being the first European to do so. He followed the river downstream 80 miles (130 km) to Silla, where he was obliged to turn back, lacking the resources to go further. Moreover, whilst travelling within Niger, many local inhabitants of the region would consistently think that he was himself a Moor, rather than European.

On his return journey, begun on 29 July, he took a route more to the south than that originally followed, keeping close to the Niger River as far as Bamako, thus tracing its course for some 300 miles (500 km). At Kamalia he fell ill, and owed his life to the kindness of a man in whose house he lived for seven months. Eventually he reached Pisania again on 10 June 1797. Unable to book passage directly to England from Bathurst, he boarded a slave ship bound for Charleston. Having learned the Mandinka language during his travels, he served as doctor to the slaves, many of whom died en route. The ship was eventually forced to dock in Antigua, from which he returned to Britain on 22 December. He had been thought dead, and his return home with news of his exploration of the Niger River evoked great public enthusiasm. An account of his journey was drawn up for the African Association by Bryan Edwards, and his own detailed narrative appeared in 1799 (Travels in the Interior of Africa).

Park was convinced that:

whatever difference there is between the negro and European, in the conformation of the nose, and the colour of the skin, there is none in the genuine sympathies and characteristic feelings of our common nature.

— Park 1799, p. 82

Park encountered a group of slaves when travelling through Mandinka country in or near modern-day Mali:

They were all very inquisitive, but they viewed me at first with looks of horror, and repeatedly asked if my countrymen were cannibals. They were very desirous to know what became of the slaves after they had crossed the salt water. I told them that they were employed in cultivating the land; but they would not believe me; and one of them putting his hand upon the ground, said with great simplicity, "have you really got such ground as this, to set your feet upon?" A deeply-rooted idea that the whites purchase Negroes for the purpose of devouring them, or of selling them to others that they may be devoured hereafter, naturally makes the slaves contemplate a journey towards the Coast with great terror, insomuch that the Slatees (Note: the black slave-merchants) are forced to keep them constantly in irons, and watch them very closely, to prevent their escape.

— Park 1799, p. 319

His book Travels in the Interior Districts of Africa became a best-seller because it detailed what he observed, what he survived, and the people he encountered. His dispassionate — if not scientific or objective — descriptions set a standard for future travel writers and gave Europeans a glimpse of Africa's humanity and complexity. Park introduced them to a vast continent unexplored by Europeans. If the African Association was the "beginning of the age of African exploration" then Mungo Park, its first successful explorer, set a standard for all who followed. After his death, European public and political interest in Africa grew. Perhaps the most lasting effect of Park's travels, though, was the influence on European colonial ambitions during the 19th century.

=== Mountains of Kong ===
Mungo Park is credited with the original report of the Mountains of Kong, a mountain range rumoured to be located in West Africa, beginning near the source of the Niger River and spanning the African continent from east to west. Geographer and cartographer James Rennell later published maps portraying the supposed mountain range. After decades of debate over range's existence, French officer and explorer Louis-Gustave Binger officially reported after his 1887-88 expedition that the Mountains of Kong did not exist. Though the range was thus proven mythical, maps depicting it continued to be published until the early 20th century.

=== Between journeys ===
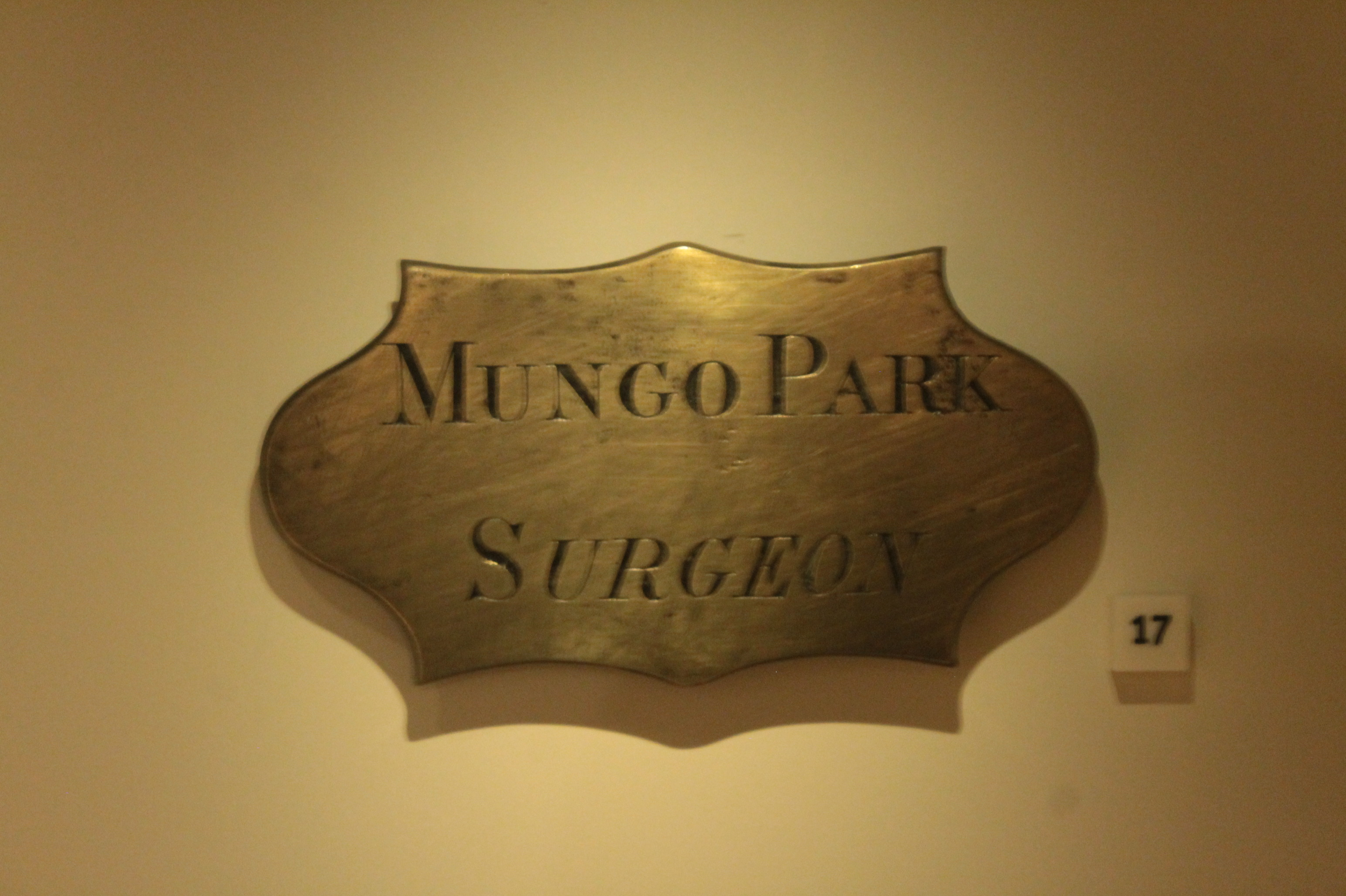
Mungo Park's doorplate from his house in Peebles, National Museum of Scotland

Settling at Foulshiels, in August 1799 Park married Allison, daughter of his apprenticeship master, Thomas Anderson. A project to go to New South Wales in some official capacity came to nothing, and in October 1801 Park moved to Peebles, where he practised as a physician.

=== Second journey ===
In the autumn of 1803, Park was invited by the government to lead another expedition to the Niger. Park, who chafed at the hardness and monotony of life at Peebles, accepted the offer, but the expedition was delayed. Part of the waiting time was occupied perfecting his Arabic; his teacher, Sidi Ambak Bubi, was a native of Mogador (now Essaouira in Morocco) whose behaviour both amused and alarmed the people of Peebles.

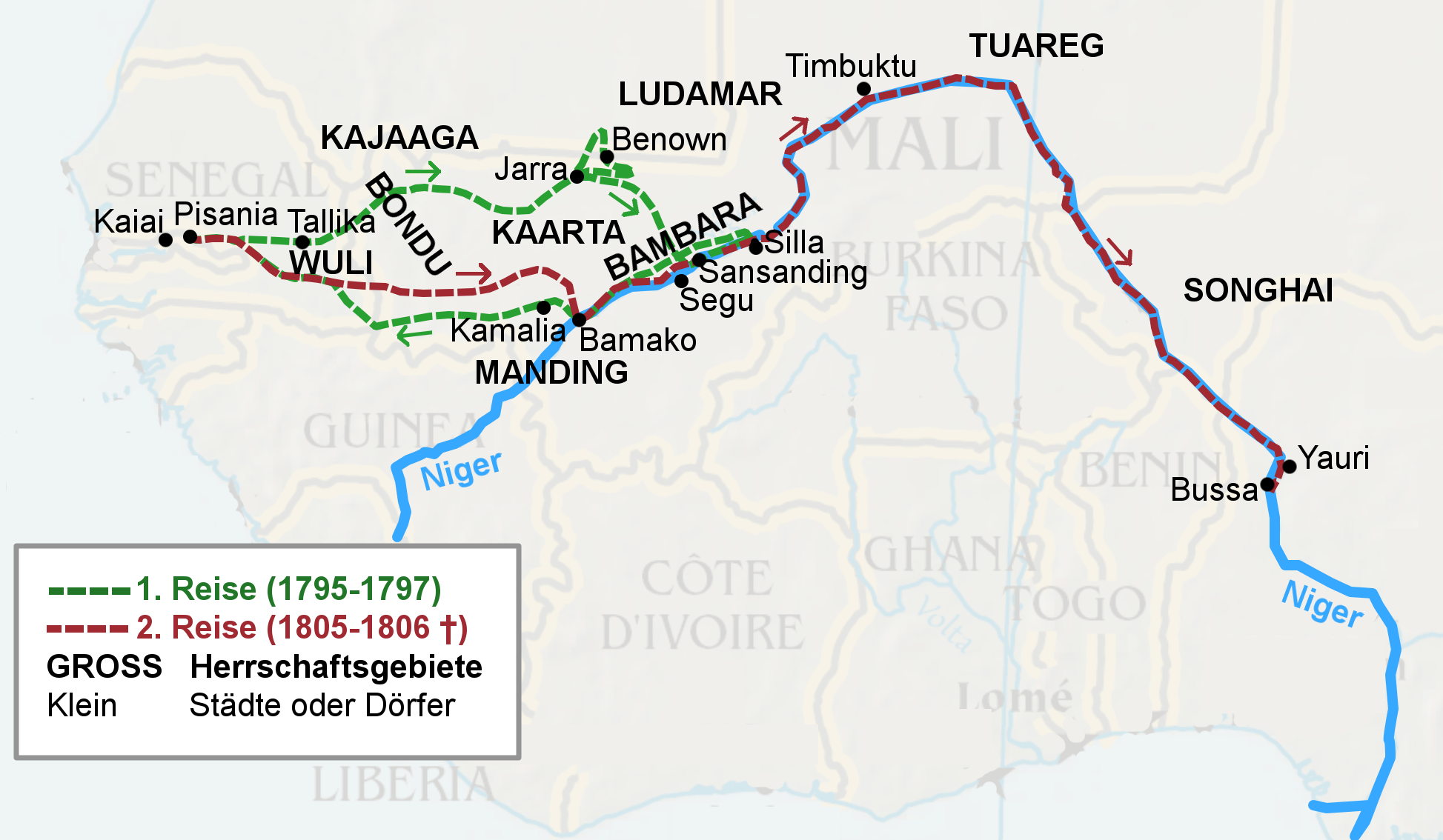
Map of Mungo Park's journeys

In May 1804, Park went back to Foulshiels, where he made the acquaintance of Walter Scott, then living nearby at Ashiesteil and with whom he soon became friendly. In September, Park was summoned to London to leave on the new expedition; he left Scott with the hopeful proverb on his lips, "Freits (omens) follow those that look to them."

Park had at that time adopted the theory that the Niger and the Congo were one, and in a memorandum drawn up before he left Britain he wrote: "My hopes of returning by the Congo are not altogether fanciful."

On 31 January 1805, he sailed from Portsmouth for Gambia, having been given a captain's commission as head of the government expedition. Alexander Anderson, his brother-in-law and second-in-command, had received a lieutenancy. George Scott, a fellow Borderer, was draughtsman, and the party included four or five artificers. At Gorée (then in British occupation) Park was joined by Lieutenant Martyn, R.A., thirty-five privates and two seamen.

The expedition got a late start into the rainy season and did not reach the Niger until mid-August, when only eleven Europeans were left alive; the rest had succumbed to fever or dysentery. From Bamako the journey to Ségou was made by canoe. Having received permission from the local ruler, Mansong Diarra, to proceed, at Sansanding, a little below Ségou, Park made ready for his journey down the still unknown part of the river. Helped by one soldier, the only one capable of work, Park converted two canoes into one tolerably good boat, 40 feet (12 m) long and 6 feet (2 m) broad. This he christened H.M. schooner Joliba (the native name for the Niger River), and in it, with the surviving members of his party, he set sail downstream on 19 November.

Anderson had died at Sansanding on 28 October, and in him Park had lost one of his few remaining valuable members. Those who embarked in the Joliba were Park, Martyn, three European soldiers (one mad), a guide and three slaves. Before his departure, Park gave to Isaaco, a Mandingo guide who had been with him thus far, letters to take back to Gambia for transmission to Britain.

The Muslim traders along this section of the Niger did not believe Park was exploring purely for intellectual curiosity but was scouting European trading routes, they saw Park as a threat to their trading dominance. They lobbied Mansong Diarra to have Park killed, and when Mansong did not, they lobbied tribes further down the river. Park understood the politics and adopted a policy of staying away from the shore towards the middle of the 2-to-3-mile-wide (3-to-5-kilometre) river while attacking anyone who came near. In the process he also avoided paying tolls/bribes to pass through each kingdom, earning the rage of local rulers, Moorish or not, who would send messengers ahead to the next tribe downriver that a dangerous interloper was coming their way. Furthermore, Park's policy of shoot first and not engaging with locals, in some cases slaughtering significant numbers of natives using superior firepower, made the Europeans something of a pariah. Park was running a gauntlet of hostile tribes in part of his own making.

To his wife, Park wrote of his intention not to stop nor land anywhere until he reached the coast, where he expected to arrive about the end of January 1806. These were the last communications received from Park, and nothing more was heard of the party until reports of disaster reached Gambia.

=== Death ===
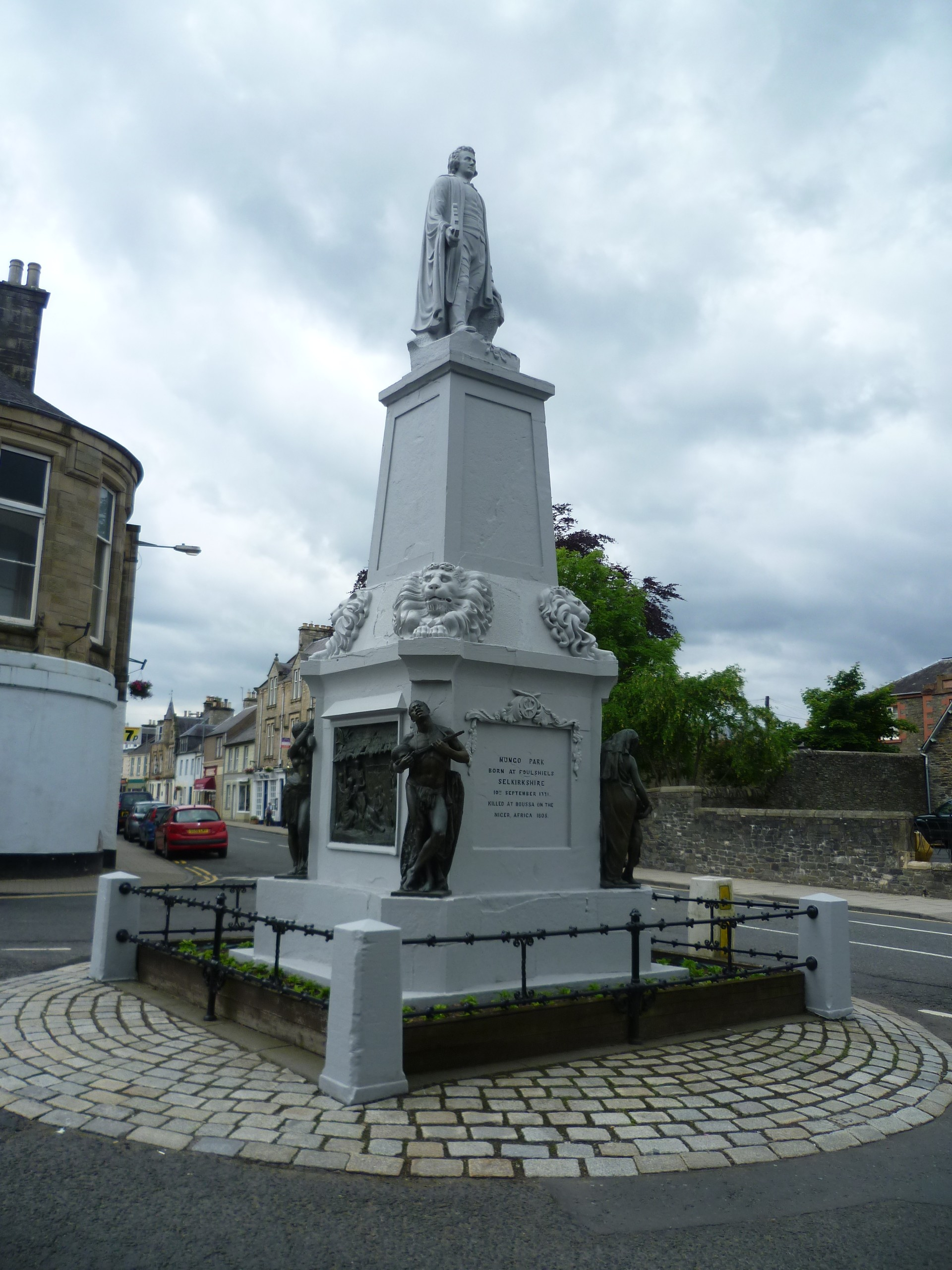
The Mungo Park Monument in Selkirk, Scotland by Andrew Currie

At length, the British government engaged Isaaco to go to the Niger to ascertain Park's fate. At Sansanding, Isaaco found Amadi Fatouma (Isaaco calls him Amaudy), the guide who had gone downstream with Park, and the substantial accuracy of the story he told was later confirmed by the investigations of Hugh Clapperton and Richard Lander.

Amadi Fatouma stated that Park's canoe had descended the river as far as Sibby without incident. After Sibby, three native canoes chased them and Park's party repulsed the pursuers with firearms. A similar incident occurred at Cabbara and again at Toomboucouton. At Gouroumo seven canoes pursued them. One of the party died of sickness leaving "four white men, myself [Amadi], and three slaves". Each person (including the slaves) had "15 musquets apiece, well loaded and always ready for action". After passing the residence of the king of Goloijigi, 60 canoes came after them which they "repulsed after killing many natives". Further along they encountered an army of the Poule nation and kept to the opposite bank to avoid an action. After a close encounter with a hippopotamus they continued past Caffo (3 canoe pursuers) to an island where Isaaco was taken prisoner. Park rescued him, and 20 canoes chased them. This time they merely asked Amadi for trinkets which Park supplied. At Gourmon they traded for provisions and were warned of an ambush ahead. They passed the army "being all Moors" and entered Haoussa, finally arriving at Yauri (which Amadi calls Yaour), where he (Fatouma) landed.

To this point of the journey of some 1,000 miles (1,600 km) Park, who had plenty of provisions, stuck to his resolution of keeping away from the natives. Below Djenné, came Timbuktu, and at various other places the natives came out in canoes and attacked his boat. These attacks were all repulsed, Park and his party having plenty of firearms and ammunition and the natives having none. The boat also escaped the many perils attendant on navigating an unknown stream strewn with many rapids; Park had built Joliba so that she drew only 1 foot (30 cm) of water.

At Haoussa, Amadi traded with the local chief. Amadi reports that Park gave him five silver rings, some powder and flints to give as a gift to the chief of the village. The following day Amadi visited the king where Amadi was accused of not having given the chief a present. Amadi was "put in irons". The king then sent an army to Boussa where there is a natural narrowing of the river commanded by high rock. But at the Bussa rapids, not far below Yauri, Park's boat became stuck on a rock and remained fast. On the bank were gathered hostile natives, who attacked the party with bow and arrow and throwing spears. Their position being untenable, Park, Martyn, and the two remaining soldiers sprang into the river and were drowned. The sole survivor was one of the slaves. After three months in irons, Amadi was released and talked with the surviving slave, from whom was obtained the story of the final scene.

=== Aftermath ===
Amadi paid a Peulh man to obtain Park's sword belt. Amadi then returned first to Sansanding and then to Segou. After, Amadi went to Dacha and told the king what had occurred. The king sent an army past "Tombouctou" (Timbuktu) to Sacha but decided that Haoussa was too far for a punitive expedition. Instead they went to Massina, a small "Paul" Peulh country where they took all the cattle and returned home. Amadi appears to have been part of this expedition: "We came altogether back to Sego" (Segou). Amadi then returned to Sansanding via Sego. Eventually the Peulh man obtained the sword belt and after a voyage of eight months met up with Amadi and gave him the belt. Isaaco met Amadi in Sego and having obtained the sword belt returned to Senegal.

Isaaco, and later Richard Lander, obtained some of Park's effects, but his journal was never recovered. In 1827 his second son, Thomas, landed on the Guinea coast, intending to make his way to Bussa, where he thought his father might be detained a prisoner; but after penetrating a little distance inland he died of fever. Park's widow, Allison, received a previously agreed upon £4,000 settlement from the African Association as a result of the death of Mungo Park. She died in 1840. Mungo Park's remains are believed to have been buried along the banks of the River Niger in Jebba, Nigeria.

With Park's death the mystery of the Niger remained unsolved. Park's theory that the Niger and Congo were the same river became the general opinion in the years after his death. However even while Park was alive, an amateur German geographer named Reichard proposed the Niger delta was the mouth of the river, but his theory was one of many and did not have much currency because the delta had so many small streams it did not appear to be from a great river. In 1821, James McQueen published a book, the result of 25 years of research, in which he correctly (it would later be seen) laid out the entire course of the Niger; however, like Reichard, his theories did not receive much notice. A number of failed expeditions were mounted, but the mystery would finally be solved 25 years after Park's death, in 1830. Richard Lander and his brother became the first Europeans to follow the course of the Niger from source to ocean.

His son Mungo Park (1800–1823) died in India at the age of 22, while in government service, and was buried at Trichinopoly.

== Medal ==
The Royal Scottish Geographical Society award the Mungo Park Medal annually in Park's honour.

== Memorial ==
A life-size statue was erected to Park on the High Street in Selkirk in 1859. The monument was sculpted by Andrew Currie. In 1905 the monument had bronze figures added on the corners and two bas-relief panels, all by Thomas J. Clapperton.

== Legacy ==
Park was the first European to provide a detailed account of West Africa and its people and their customs as well as the course of the Niger: filling in what had been an alarming blank on the maps up until then.

His contemporaries viewed him as their greatest explorer but later, in 1934 he is seen as a more contradictory figure, cool but impassioned, cowardly but courageous.

The most recent assessment includes an appreciation that although his geographical achievements may have fallen short, he should be credited with the commitment to his companions, offering succour to the dying as his expedition collapsed around him.

== In media ==
Circa 1836, Richard Adams Locke (author of the Great Moon Hoax) composed a fictional Lost Manuscript of Mungo Park, in which Park explores the interior of the hollow Earth.

Mungo Park is mentioned in Herman Melville's 1851 novel Moby-Dick (Chapter 5: Breakfast), and several times, parodically, in Ernest Hemingway's short story "A Natural History of the Dead".

The protagonist of the 1966 children's book Chike and the River by Chinua Achebe states that he feels "as proud as Mungo Park" at the sight of the Niger River.

Mungo Park appears as one of the two protagonists in T. C. Boyle's 1981 historical novel Water Music.

Tom Fremantle's 2005 travelogue The Road to Timbuktu: Down the Niger on the Trail of Mungo Park details Mungo Park's biography and retraces his travels.

English singer Ben Onono mentions Mungo Park in his song "Badagry Beach".

== Works ==
- Park, Mungo (1797). "Descriptions of eight new fishes from Sumatra. Read 4 November 1794". Transactions of the Linnean Society. 3: 33–38. doi:10.1111/j.1096-3642.1797.tb00553.x.
- — (1799). Travels in the Interior Districts of Africa: Performed Under the Direction and Patronage of the African Association, in the Years 1795, 1796, and 1797. London: W. Bulmer and Company.
- — (1815). The Journal of a Mission to the Interior of Africa, in the Year 1805: Together with other documents, official and private, relating to the same mission : to which is prefixed an account of the life of Mr. Park. London: John Murray.
- — (1816a). Travels in the Interior Districts of Africa: Performed in the Years 1795, 1796, and 1797. Vol. 1. London: John Murray.
- — (1816b). Travels in the Interior Districts of Africa: Performed in the Years 1795, 1796, and 1797. Vol. 2. London: John Murray.
- — (1903) [1799-1815]. Travels in the Interior Districts of Africa: Performed in the Years 1795, 1796 & 1797, with an Account of a Subsequent Mission to That Country in 1805. London: George Newnes.

== Taxon described by him ==
- See Category:Taxa named by Mungo Park

== See also ==
- Physician writer

== Sources ==
- Anonymous ("H.B.") (1835). The Life of Mungo Park. Edinburgh: Fraser.
- Bovill, E. W. (1968). The Niger Explored. London: Oxford University Press.
- Chisholm, Hugh, ed. (1911). "Park, Mungo". Encyclopædia Britannica. Vol. 20 (11th ed.). Cambridge University Press. pp. 826–827.
- Fyfe, C. (23 September 2004). "Park, Mungo (1771–1806), traveller in Africa". Oxford Dictionary of National Biography. Archived from the original on 22 October 2023.
- Gifford, William, ed. (April 1815). "Review of The Journal of a Mission to the Interior of Africa, in the Year 1805 by Mungo Park". The Quarterly Review. 13: 120–151.
- Holmes, Richard (2008). The Age of Wonder: How the Romantic Generation Discovered the Beauty and Terror of Science. HarperPress. ISBN 978-0-00-714952-0.
- Hudson, Peter (1991). Two Rivers: Travels in West Africa on the Trail of Mungo Park. London: Chapmans. ISBN 978-1-855-92528-1.
- Isaaco (1814). Thomson, Thomas (ed.). "Isaaco's journal of a voyage after Mr Mungo Park, to ascertain his life or death". Annals of Philosophy. IV (23). Robert Baldwin: 369–385. The Annals notes that Isaaco's account was "written originally in Arabic, from which it was translated into Joliffe [?], thence to French, and from French into English". The footnote ends: It appears to have been very badly translated, and is in many parts scarcely intelligible".
- Kryza, Frank T. (2006). The Race for Timbuktu: In Search of Africa's City of Gold. New York: HarperCollins. ISBN 0060560649.
- Lupton, Kenneth (1979). Mungo Park: The African Traveler. Oxford University Press. ISBN 978-0-19-211749-6.
- Maclachlan, T. Banks (1898). Mungo Park. Edinburgh: Oliphant, Anderson & Ferrier.
- Thomson, Joseph (1890). Mungo Park and the Niger. New York: Dodd, Mead and Co.
