= J. B. Selkirk =

Scottish poet and essayist (1832–1904)

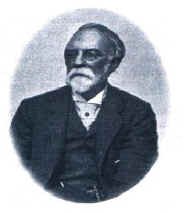
- James Brown of Selkirk
- Born: Brown; 1832; Galashiels
- Died: 25 December 1904 (aged 71–72); Selkirk
- Occupation: Poet
- Spouse: Agnes Brown Bucham
- Children: 9
- Writing career
- Pen name: J. B. Selkirk
- Website: www.walkaboutcrafts.com/worldtour/scotland/poetry/jbselkirk.htm

James Brown (J. B. Selkirk) (1832 – 25 December 1904) was a Scottish poet and essayist. Greatly admired by other great writers including Tennyson.

J. B. Selkirk was a distinguished poet and man of letters. His real name was actually James Brown. His would sign his works 'J. B. Selkirk (i.e. James Brown of Selkirk). He soon become better known as J. B. Selkirk than James Brown.

== Youth and schooling ==
Brown was born in Galashiels in 1832. He was the seventh of ten children born to Mr and Mrs Henry Brown. Shortly after his birth the family moved to 'Galahill' which overlooks part of the Borderland known as 'Scotland's Eden'. The family then moved to Selkirk when he was still an infant. His father, Henry Brown, was one of the pioneers of the woollen industry in the district - responsible for building the first part of Ettrick Mills. Together with his brother James, he founded the firm J & H Brown & Co. in 1835. Their father William was also associated with the venture and in 1837 the three men were created honorary burgesses of Selkirk in recognition of the benefits they had brought to the town and the people. J.B. was educated at Selkirk Grammar School and the Edinburgh Institution before joining his father's firm where he proved an excellent designer. From an early age he studied music and architecture. In addition to poetry, he received lessons from the late Arthur Piegal R.S.A.. and had a picture of St Mary's Loch hung at the exhibition of the Royal Scottish Academy.

== Works ==
His first love though was poetry. He wrote prose and verse for various papers and periodicals, his first efforts being printed in The Scotsman. Longham, Green & Co. London in 1869 also published a volume of his poems. A new and enlarged version was published in 1883 by Kegan Paul, Trench & Co. London and another by Blackwood in 1896. A fourth edition by R & R Clark Ltd, Edinburgh 1905 and a fifth edition in two volumes was published by James Lewis, Selkirk in 1911. He also contributed essays on poetry as well as poems to Blackwood's Magazine, Cornhill Magazine, Chambers's Edinburgh Journal and other periodicals. Some of his essays were published by Smith, Elder & Co, London in 1878 in a volume entitled Ethical and Aesthetica of Modern Poetry and he was also author of Bible Truths with Shakspearean Parallels published by Whittaker & Co., London in 1862 and of which two further editions were printed. His writings cover a fairly wide variety of themes - love, death, sorrow, regret, longing, religion, nature, philosophy and patriotism etc. as well as hymnology and political speeches. Undoubtedly the most popular of his poems is "Auld Selkirk Toon" the words of which were put to music by G. R. Colledge and adopted as one of the town's songs at Selkirk's great annual festival - the common riding.

== Marriage ==
In 1858 J.B. Selkirk married Agnes Brown Bucham, a daughter of Mr and Mrs Robert Bucham of Hardacres, Kelso. They lived at 'Cascade', a house overlooking the Tweed midway between Selkirk and Galashiels before moving to Thornfield, Selkirk which was built by himself in 1870. he also built a villa in Cannes which he named Yarrow. Agnes to whom he was totally devoted was his incentive to write. The influence of her strong character helped and upheld him and to her memory were written some of his finest yet saddest poems.

== Later life ==
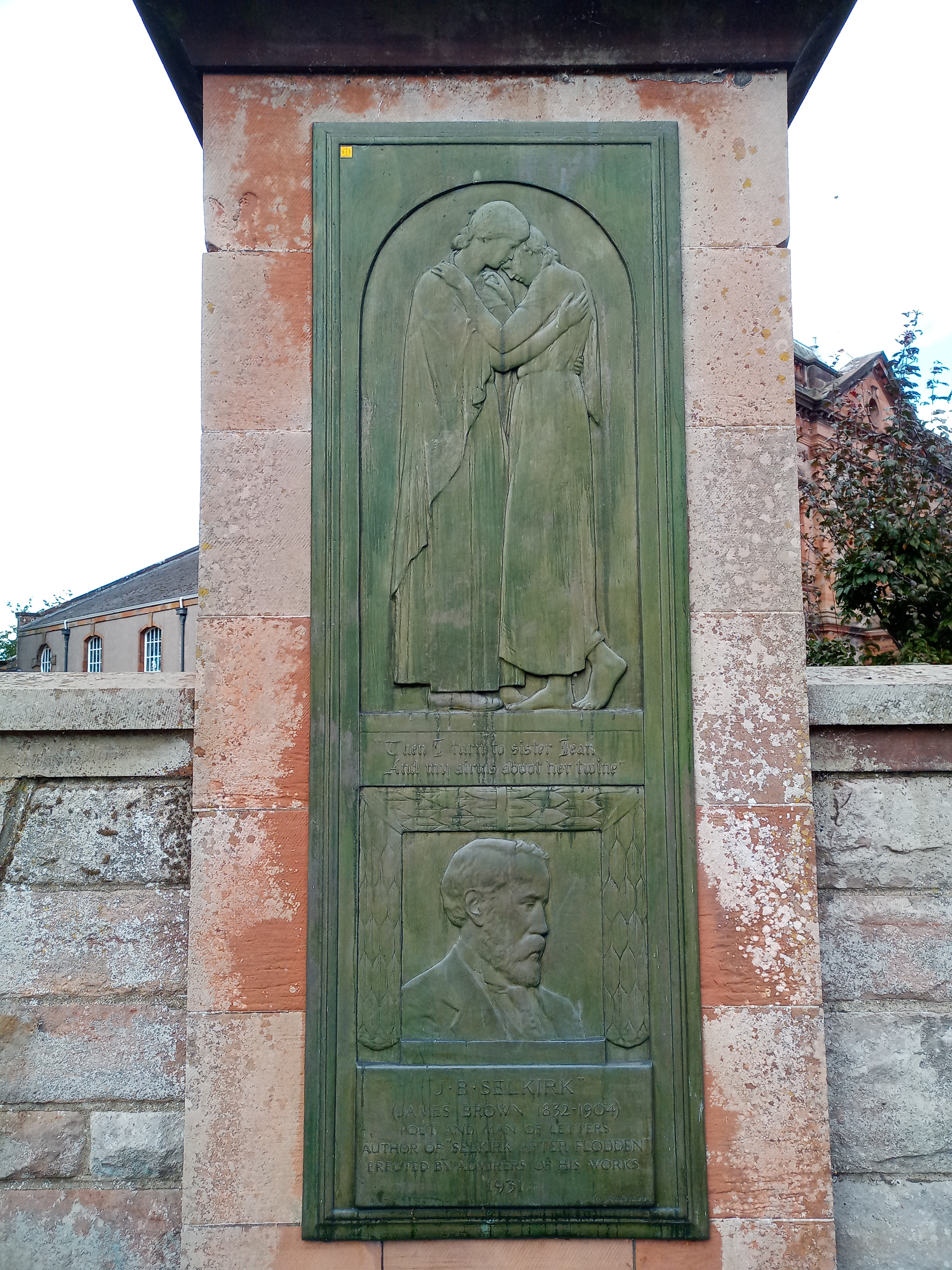
James Brown Selkirk's Plaque in Scotts Place in Selkirk

J.B. Selkirk was twice invited to become provost of Selkirk after the passing of the education act he was returned as member of the Selkirk school board. He was the last Deacon and the last surviving member in the year 1899 of the ancient cooperation of Selkirk weavers, who obtained custody of the English flag from Flodden field. He was also responsible for the preservation of the parchment and seal of the cooperation which dated back to 1600.

Agnes died in 1874 aged 37 after bearing him 9 children. the early death of his wife was the deterioration of J.B. Selkirk. Full of sadness he seemed unable to sustain effort in his writings.

For many years his health was very poor. Several years before his death he was a complete invalid. He died on Christmas Day 1904 his resting place is beside that of his wife in the old churchyard of his dearly loved ' Auld Selkirk Toon'. A memorial was erected in September 1931 in honour of J.B. Selkirk it was designed to express in bronze what J.B.Selkirk has epitomized in poetry.
