= Andrew Currie (sculptor) =

Scottish sculptor and antiquarian

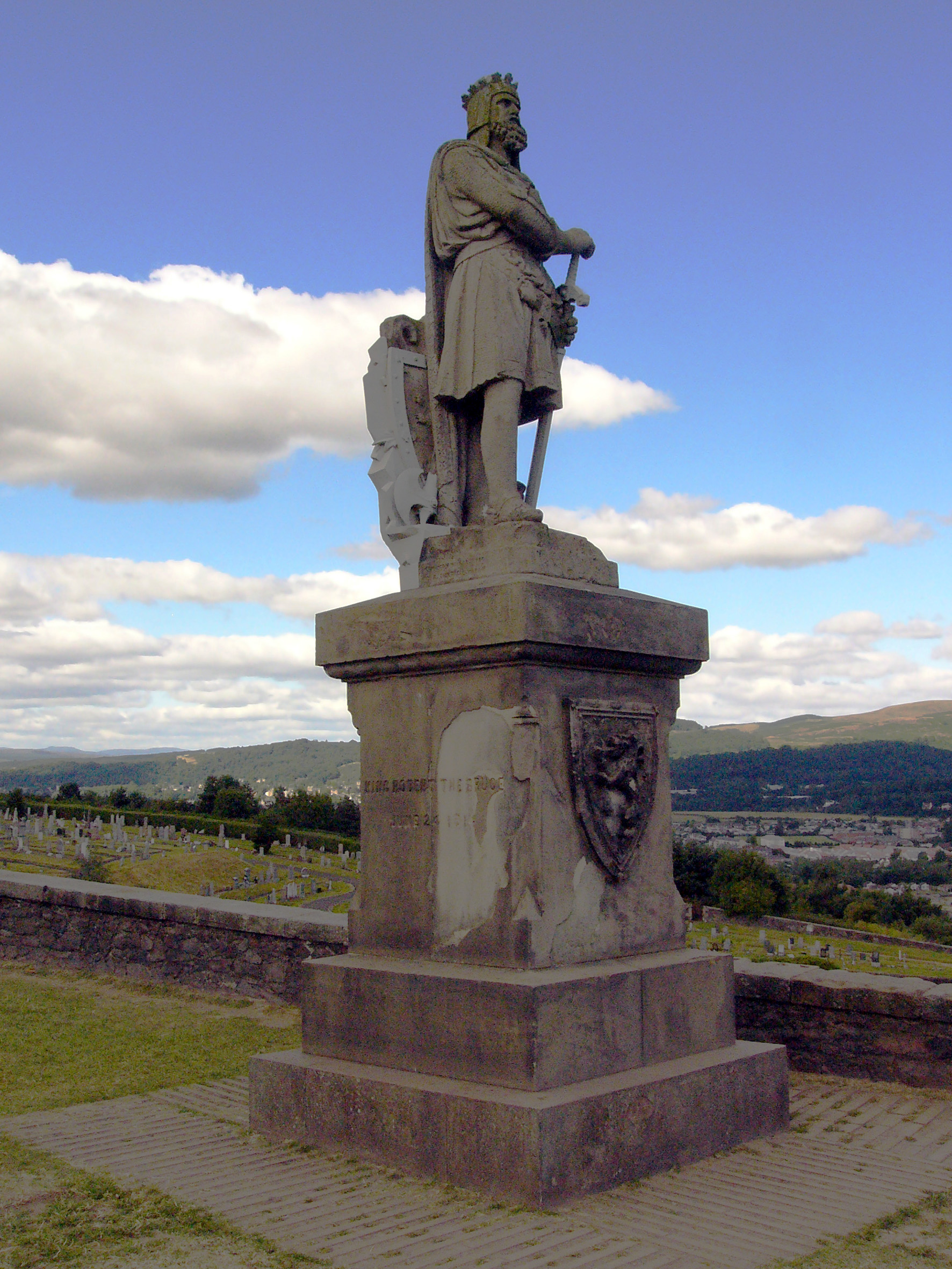
Robert the Bruce statue at Stirling Castle

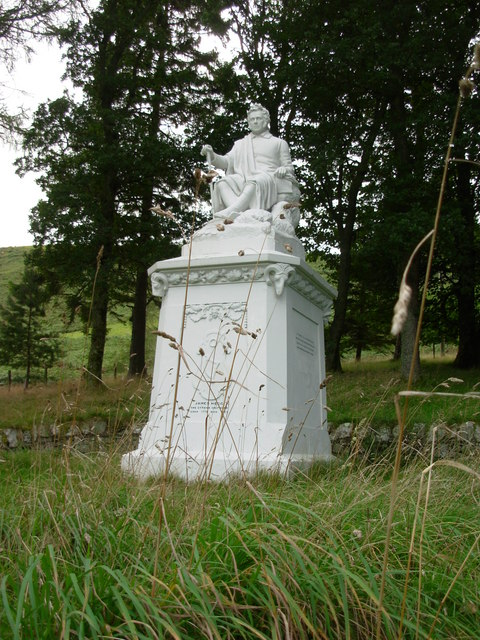
James Hogg monument at St Mary's Loch

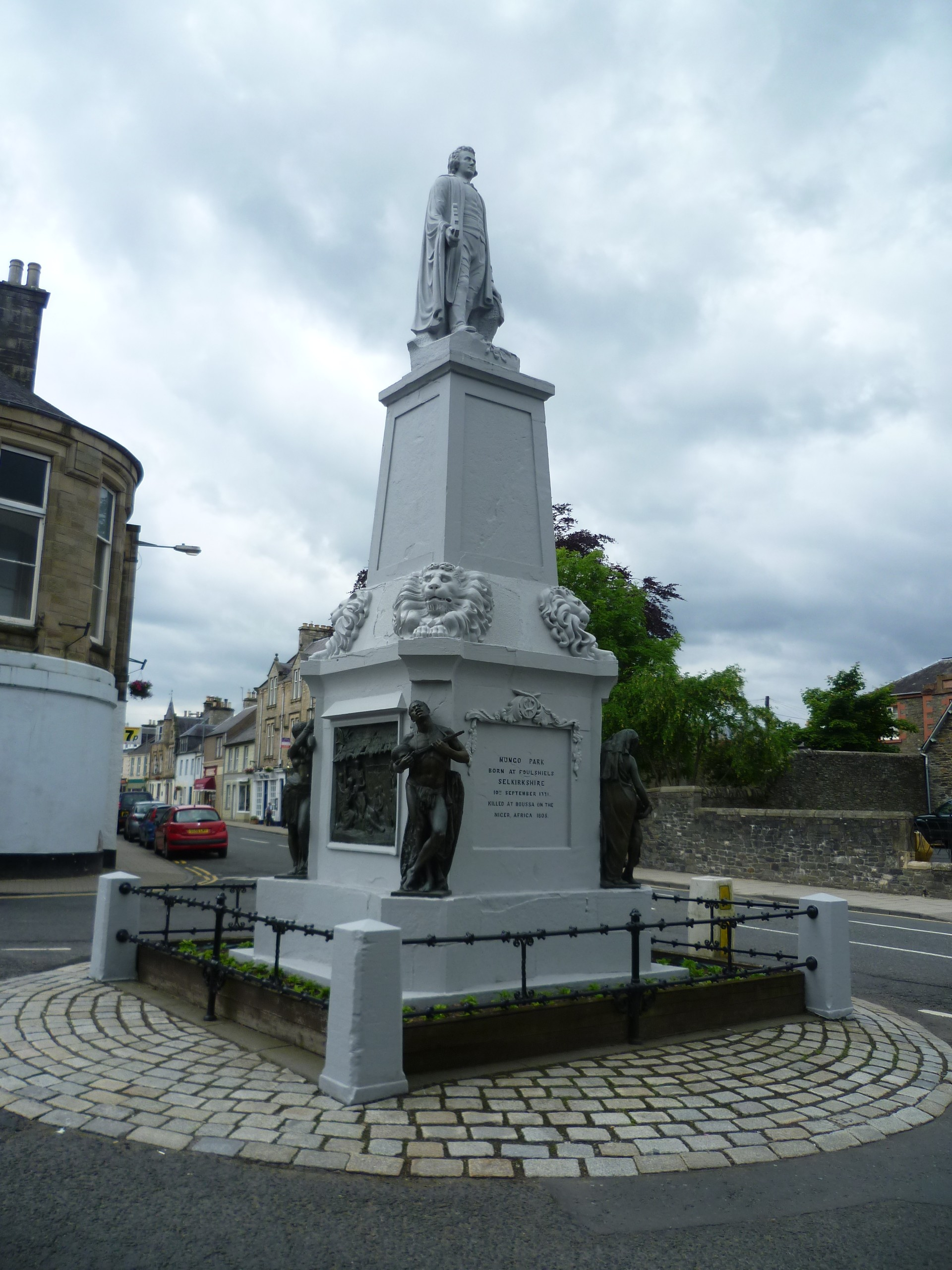
The Mungo Park Monument in Selkirk, Scotland by Andrew Currie

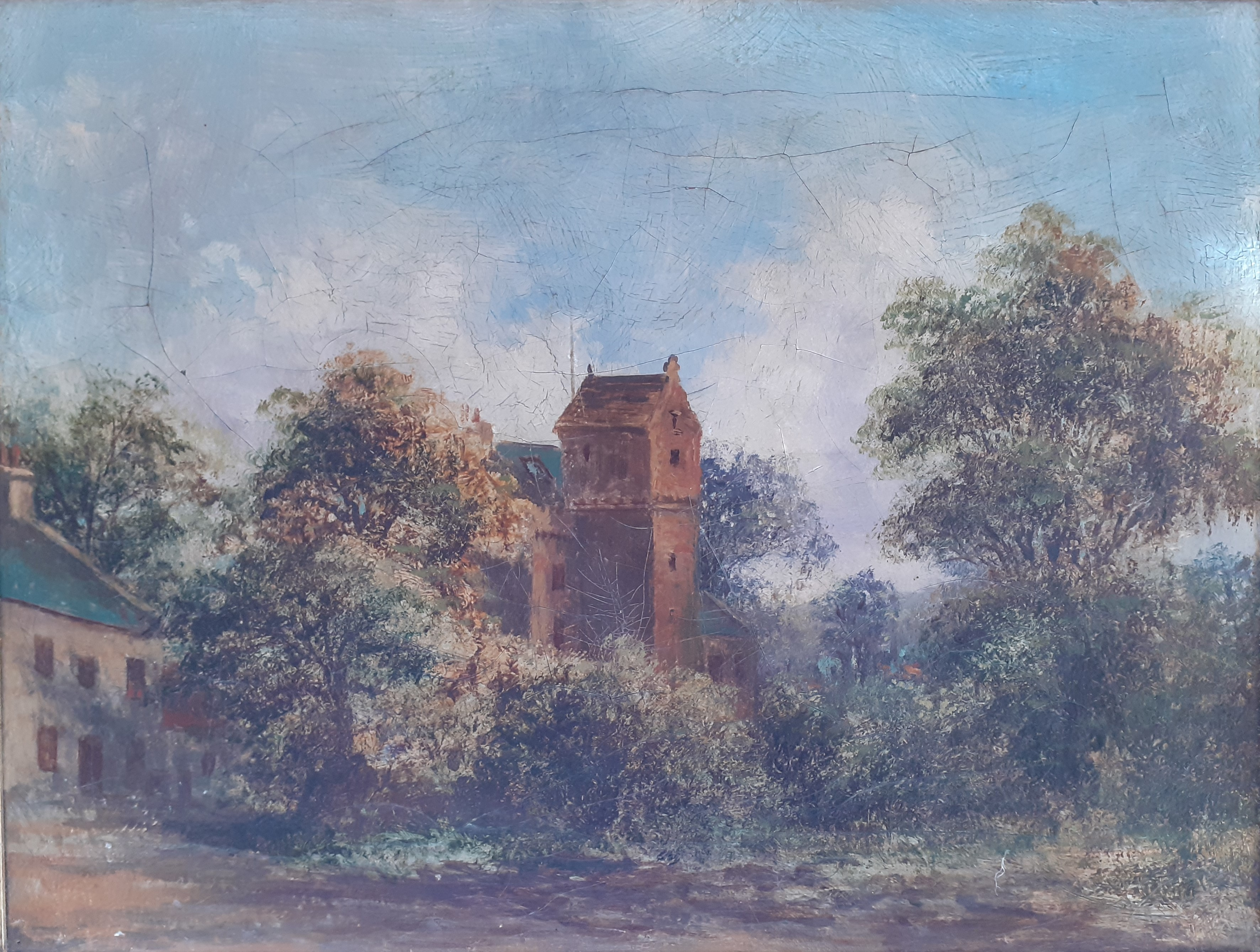
A painting by Andrew Currie of Darnick Tower, near Melrose, where he operated his workshop

Andrew Currie (1812–1891) was a Scottish sculptor and antiquarian. His most noted works are the statue of James Hogg at St Mary's Loch (1860) (sometimes called the Ettrick Shepherd), the statue of Robert the Bruce on the esplanade at Stirling Castle (1876), and the figures of Edie Ochiltree and Old Mortality on the Scott Monument.

== Life ==
Currie was born in the Ettrick Forest area, the son of a Howford sheep farmer, in 1812. He was apprenticed as a mill-wright in Denholm. He is known to have attended Yarrow church with James Hogg and knew him personally, adding greatly to the authenticity of his later statue to him.

After initially travelling south to London and working in the Chatham Dockyard Currie returned to Scotland in 1839 and continued to work as a mill-wright in Earlston until his forties when he began his career as a sculptor. He was aged 43 when he begin exhibiting at the Royal Scottish Academy. He exhibited from 1855 to 1877. Around 1857 he moved to Darnick, operating a workshop in the grounds of Darnick Tower. He was the grandfather of painter and illustrator Noel Laura Nisbet, known for her works inspired by fairy tales, legends, and allegorical themes.

Currie converted to Catholicism in 1864. He died in 1891 and is buried in Weirhill Cemetery in Melrose.

== Other known works ==
- Statue of Mungo Park in Selkirk (1859)
- Statue of Robert the Bruce, Stirling Castle Esplanade (1876)
- Edie Ochiltree, The Gaberlunzie man, (probably a practice-piece for the second Scott Monument figure), in the grounds of Scott's home, Abbotsford House.
- Girl with Flowers, Edinburgh City Art Centre (1882).
- Carved bookshelf, originally carved for Cowdenknowes House
- Fairy Flower Stand, (wood-carving) exhibited RSA 1855, current whereabouts unknown
- Side altar and pulpit, Our Lady and St Andrews Church, Galashiels
- Moss Trooper, Netherby Hall
- Fireplace and over-mantle exported to his brother, John Lang Currie, for his mansion in St Kilda, Melbourne
