= Statue of Bruce Lee =

Statue of Bruce Lee may refer to:

- Statue of Bruce Lee (Hong Kong)
- Statue of Bruce Lee (Los Angeles)
- Statue of Bruce Lee (Mostar)

== See also ==
- Bruce Statue (disambiguation)
