= Bruce Statue =

Bruce Statue may refer to:

- Statue of Bruce Lee (disambiguation)
  - Statue of Bruce Lee (Hong Kong)
  - Statue of Bruce Lee (Los Angeles)
  - Statue of Bruce Lee (Mostar)
- Statue of Robert the Bruce (disambiguation)
  - Equestrian statue of Robert the Bruce, Bannockburn
  - Statue of Robert the Bruce, Stirling Castle

== See also ==
- The Special Warfare Memorial Statue, known as Bronze Bruce
