= Los Angeles Aerial Rapid Transit =

Proposed aerial gondola

Overview
- Other name: LA ART
- Character: Urban
- Country: United States
- Termini: Los Angeles Union Station; Dodger Stadium
- No. of stations: 3
- Open: TBD
- Website: www.laart.la

Operation
- Trip duration: 7 minutes

The Los Angeles Aerial Rapid Transit Project is a proposed aerial gondola in Los Angeles, California, United States, connecting Union Station to the Dodger Stadium property with an intermediate station at Los Angeles State Historic Park. The aerial gondolas will also serve Elysian Park adjacent to the stadium.

== Background ==
Dodger Stadium was built where the former neighborhoods of Chavez Ravine once stood. Earthmovers reshaped the hills beginning in 1959 and the stadium overlooking downtown Los Angeles opened April 10, 1962 in the Elysian Park neighborhood of Los Angeles. The conditional use permit included a requirement that permanent transit to the stadium would be pursued.

The stadium is surrounded by 130 acres (53 ha) of parking lots. In 2008, Dodgers owner Frank McCourt wanted to transform the ballpark into a year-round destination for dining, shopping and recreation. The project description included a Dodger museum, shops, and restaurants. The project was not initiated but McCourt retained partial ownership in the sprawling surface parking lots that wrap the stadium when he sold the team and stadium.

Fans create parking headaches for Echo Park residents. Before a game, bumper to bumper traffic winds through the hilly streets to reach the stadium from several directions. On week days, rush hour increases the traffic crunch. The Los Angeles County Metropolitan Transportation Authority (Metro) has two Dodger Stadium Express bus routes that transport fans to and from the stadium for games. The Chinatown station is the nearest station of the Los Angeles Metro Rail system. From there, it is a little over a mile walk through the Chinatown neighborhood with a pedestrian bridge available at the north end of Yale Street over the 110 Freeway.

== History ==
Aerial Rapid Transit Technologies, LLC announced in 2018 a plan to construct a gondola system between Union Station and Dodger Stadium. With a seven-minute end-to-end ride, each cabin would hold 30 to 40 passengers. Proposed construction funding in part would be by former Dodgers owner Frank McCourt and other private sources. Operations would likely be largely funded by corporate sponsorships and tourist fares. Metro accepted the unsolicited proposal and became the lead agency for the Environmental Impact Report in October 2020. The company transferred the project to the nonprofit Zero Emissions Transit in August 2022. The nonprofit is run by a group called Climate Resolve that aims to reduce pollution related to climate change. Los Angeles mayor Eric Garcetti supported the project but Karen Bass took over that seat on the Metro board when she assumed the office of mayor on December 12, 2022.

The project has renewed fears of gentrification in the Chinatown community especially among the many elderly residents. An organization that would have a 195-foot tall tower (59 m) next to their headquarters claimed the proposal was a private tourist attraction and not a public transportation link. They lost their challenge in court in January 2023 when the judge cited evidence that there would be drop in private automobile trips to and from the stadium on an average game day. Researchers at the UCLA Mobility Lab found that the gondola would likely take roughly 608 cars off the road. They found that the gondola could reduce traffic on major roads around stadium on the night of a sold-out game.

Approval of the environmental impact report was delayed in January 2024 by Metro Board of Directors after City Councilmember Eunisses Hernandez introduced a motion for the council to suspend any actions. Besides the lack of a recent traffic study, she had concerns about the impacts on native wildlife, noise and light pollution, privacy of residents along the route, and accelerating gentrification. The Metro board support approval was subject to the several conditions.

== Route ==
A spokesperson from LA ART claimed the route runs mostly along public property and city streets and would not displace residents. The route connects to Union Station at Alameda Street which it follows before it runs along the perimeter of Los Angeles State Historic Park where a station will be built close to the Chinatown station on the A line. It continues along the Metro rail line alignment to an angle point where it heads up Bishops Road to the stadium, crossing the freeway near the Stadium Way crossing.
