= Chinatown station (Los Angeles Metro) =

Los Angeles Metro Rail station

Chinatown
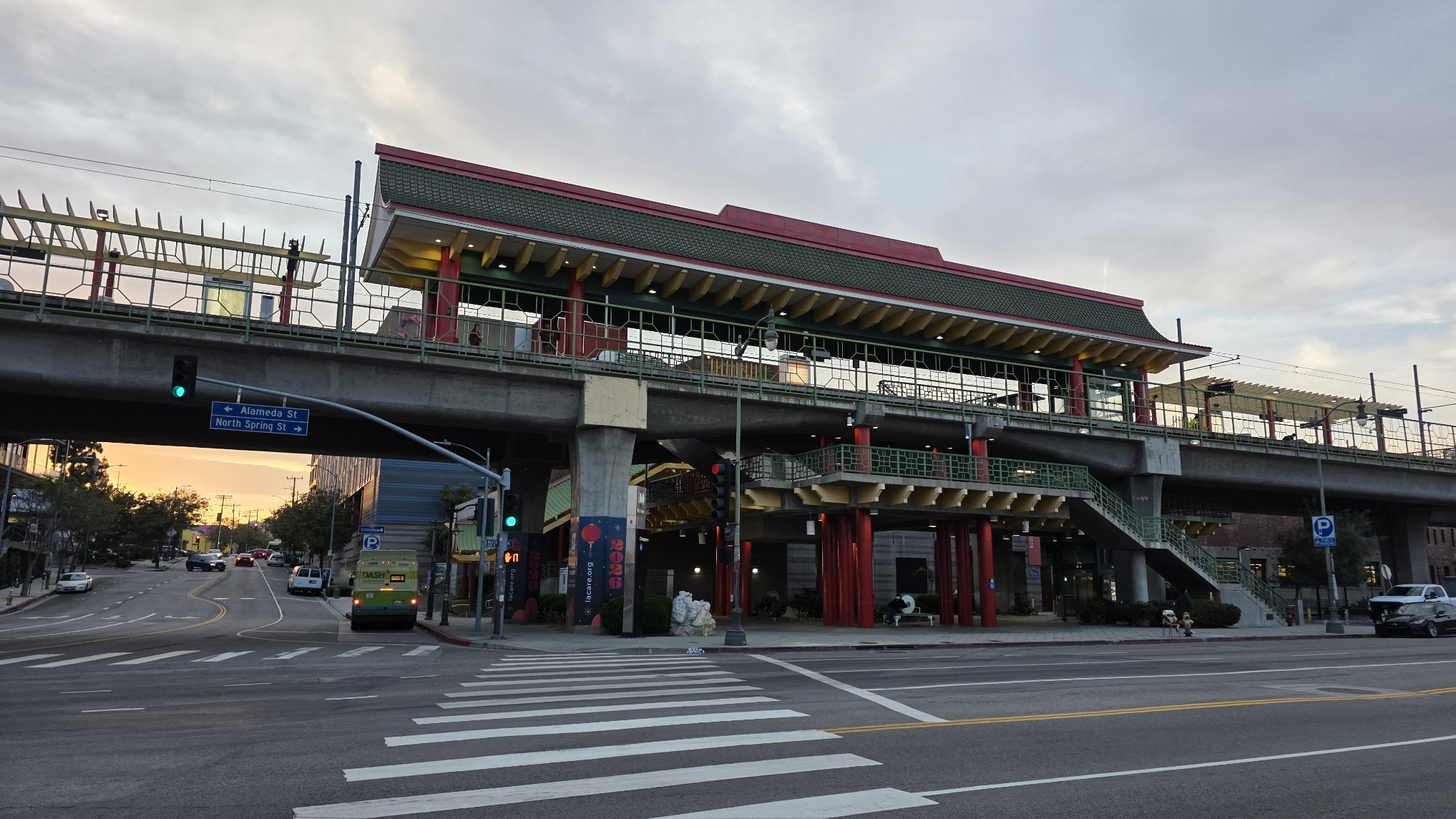
- Chinatown Station as viewed from North Spring Street/West College Street intersection, 2026

General information
- Location: 901 North Spring Street; Los Angeles, California
- Coordinates: 34.0635°N 118.2357°W
- Owner: Los Angeles County Metropolitan Transportation Authority
- Platforms: 1 island platform
- Tracks: 2
- Connections: Los Angeles Metro Bus; City of Santa Clarita Transit; LADOT Commuter Express; LADOT DASH

Construction
- Structure type: Elevated
- Cycle facilities: Metro Bike Share station and racks
- Accessible: Yes

History
- Opened: July 26, 2003

Passengers
- FY 2025: 1,180 (avg. wkdy boardings)

Services
Preceding station	Metro Rail	Following station
Union Station toward Long Beach	A Line	Lincoln/Cypress toward Pomona
Former services
Preceding station	Metro Rail	Following station
Union Station toward East Los Angeles	L Line	Lincoln/Cypress toward Azusa

Proposed services
Preceding station	Los Angeles Aerial Rapid Transit	Following station
Dodger Stadium Terminus	LA ART Proposed opening 2028	Union Station Terminus
Location

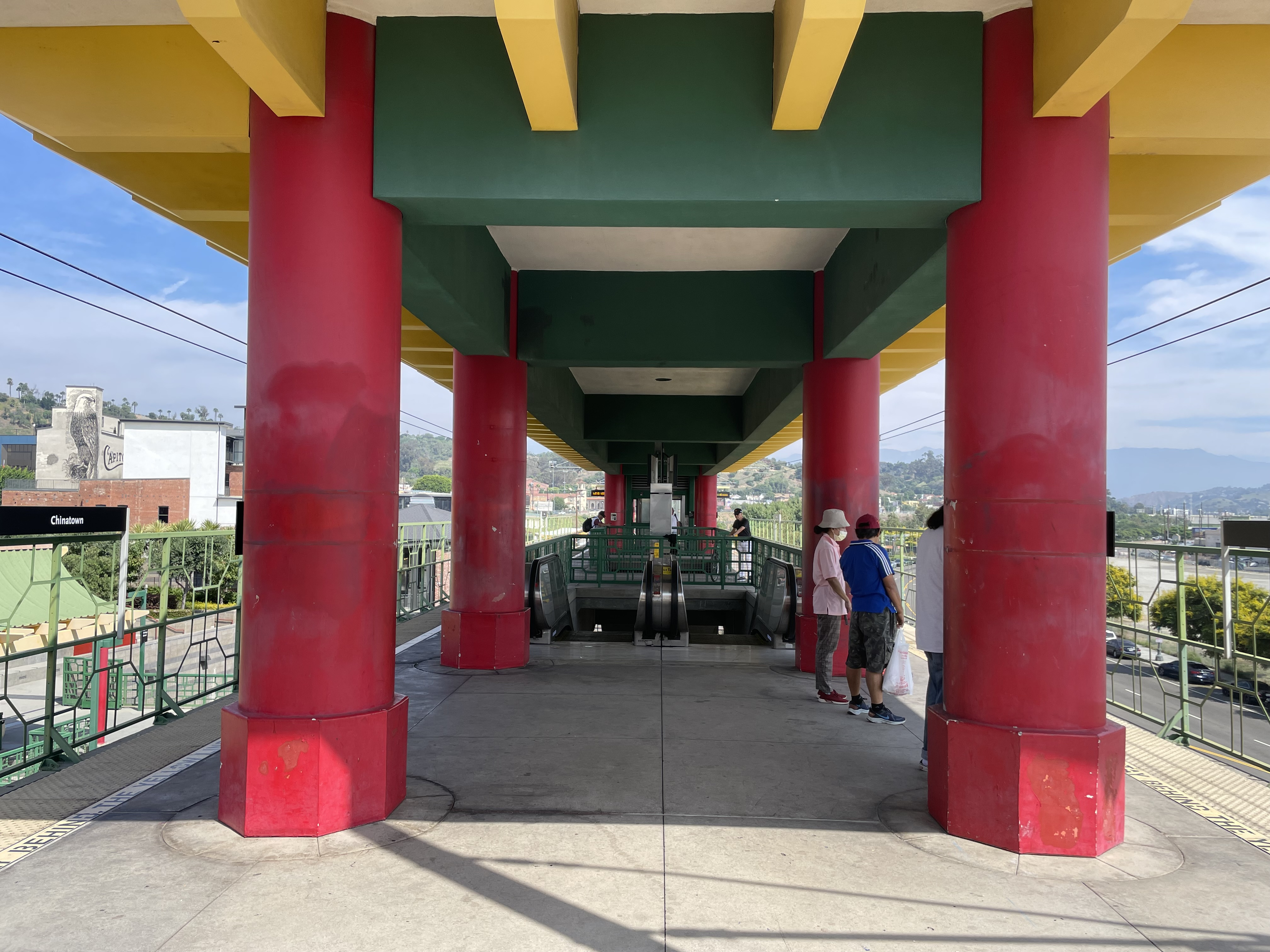
View from station platform.

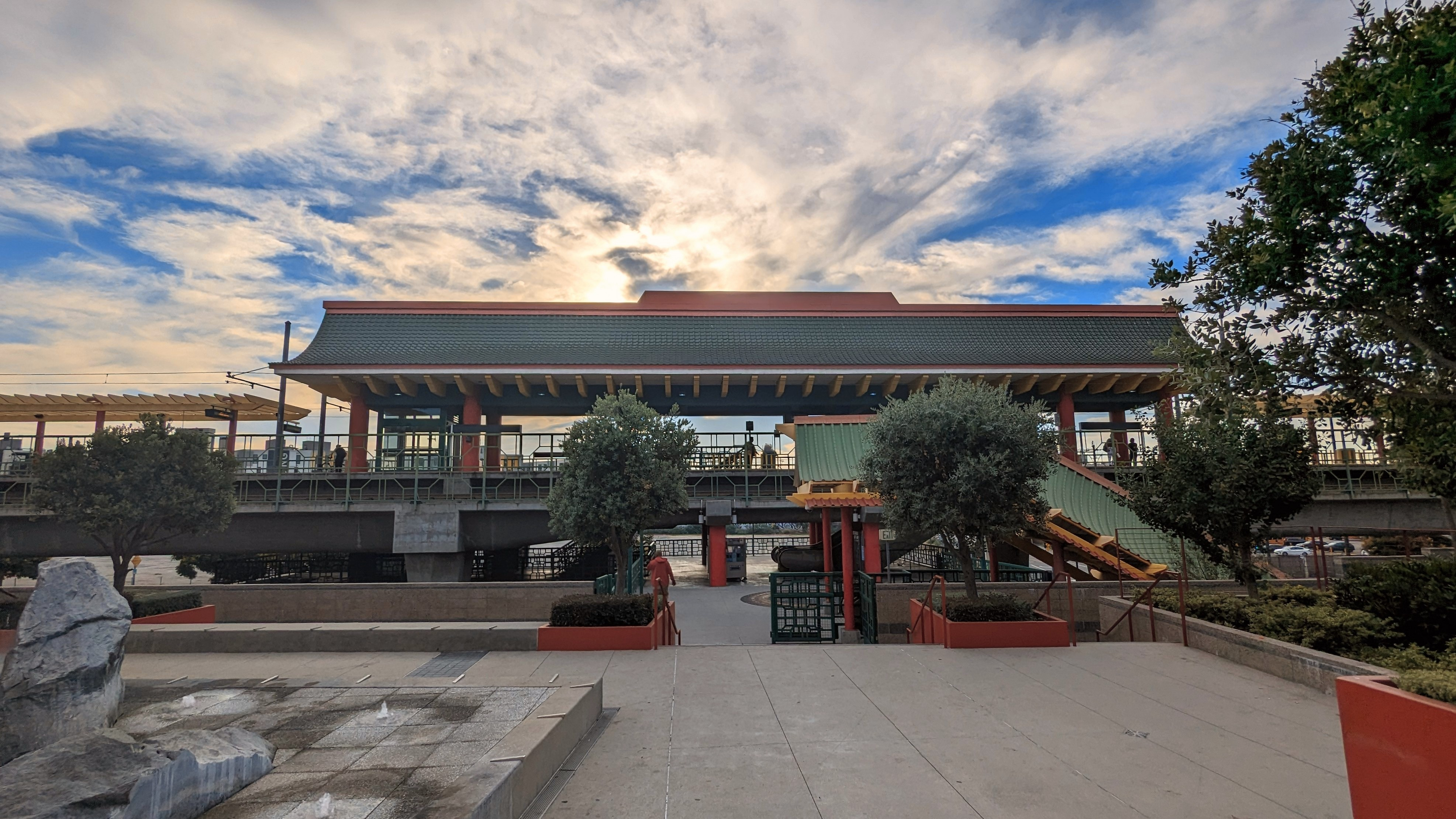
Facing east from the mezannine plaza.

Chinatown station is an elevated light rail station on the A Line of the Los Angeles Metro Rail system. It is located along Spring Street above College Street in the Chinatown neighborhood of Los Angeles, just north of Downtown Los Angeles. This station opened on July 26, 2003, as part of the original Gold Line, then known as the "Pasadena Metro Blue Line" project.

The Chinatown station is a short walk from North Broadway, a bustling street of Chinese-American restaurants and stores. Broadway is accessible through a flat walkway between the North Mezzanine and Blossom Plaza, which is lined with businesses and apartment buildings.

== Service ==
=== Hours and frequency ===
A Line service hours are from approximately 4:30 a.m. and 11:45 p.m. daily. Trains operate every 8 minutes during peak hours, Monday to Friday. Trains run every 10 minutes, during midday on weekdays and weekends, from 9:00 a.m. to 7:00 p.m. Night and early morning service is approximately every 20 minutes every day.

=== Connections ===
As of December 15, 2024, the following connections are available:

- City of Santa Clarita Transit: 794, 799
- LADOT Commuter Express: 409, 419
- LADOT DASH: B, Lincoln Heights/Chinatown
- Los Angeles Metro Bus: 76, 81, 90, 94

=== Station ===
Wheels of Change is a public Metro Art installation by Chusien Chang located at the Los Angeles Chinatown Metro Station, part of the LA Metro A Line (previously the Gold Line). Unveiled in 2003, the artwork explores themes of cultural diversity, historical recognition, and the philosophy of change inspired by the Chinese I-Ching (Book of Change).

The installation includes several striking elements: granite-inlaid I-Ching symbols and trigrams on the station’s mezzanine, aluminum benches adorned with symbols representing different cultural communities in Chinatown, and a prominent bronze Yong Bell gifted by Guangzhou, China. The artwork also pays tribute to Chinese immigrants who contributed to the development of the American railroad system, blending historical homage with modern artistic expression.

== Notable places nearby ==
The station is within walking distance of the following notable places:

- Chinese Historical Society of Southern California
- Dodger Stadium
- Los Angeles State Historic Park
- Thien Hau Temple
