= Chinatown, Los Angeles =

Neighborhood in Los Angeles, US

Chinatown
- Neighborhood
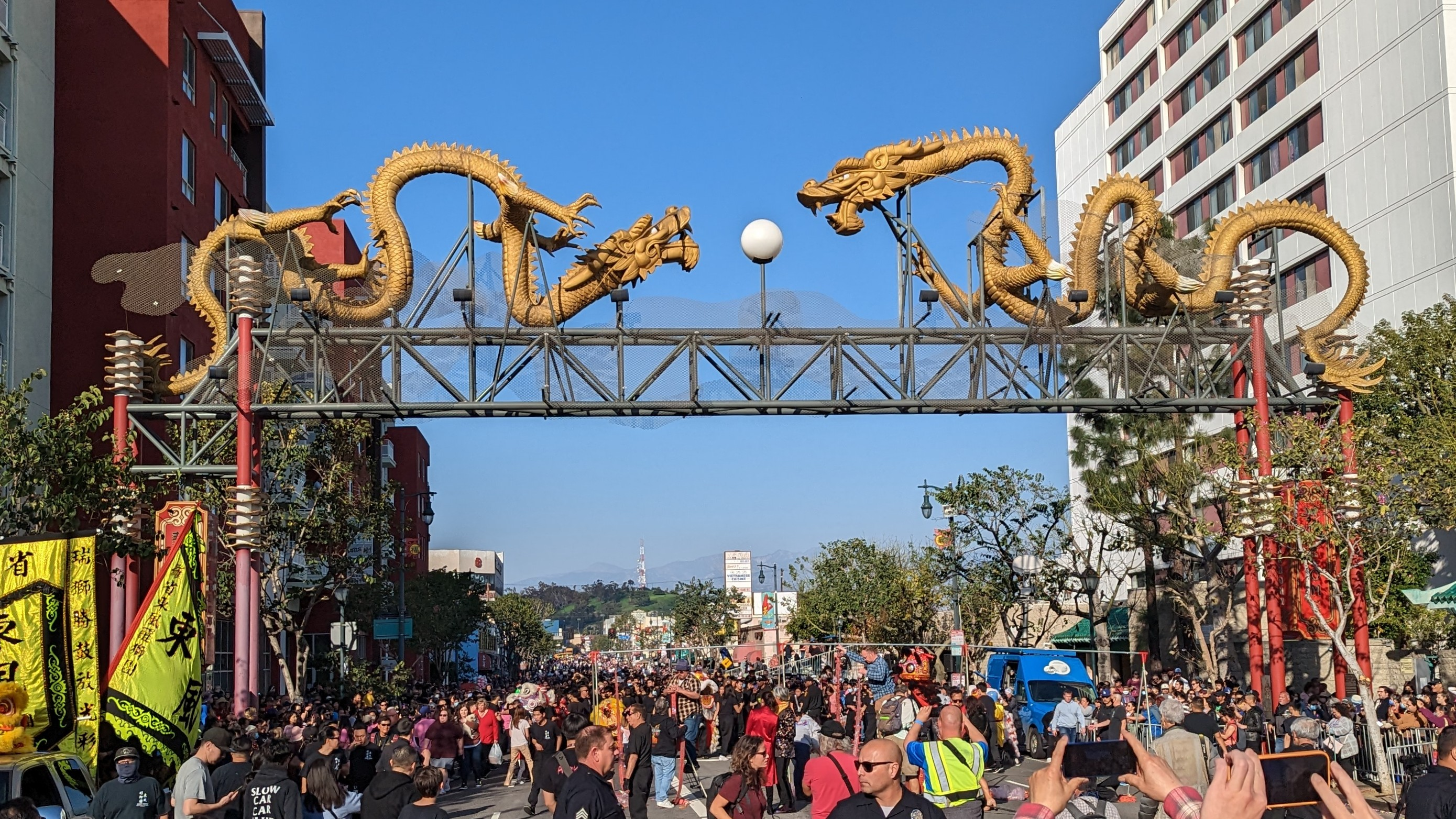
- Chinatown Gateway Monument, marking the entrance to Los Angeles' Chinatown

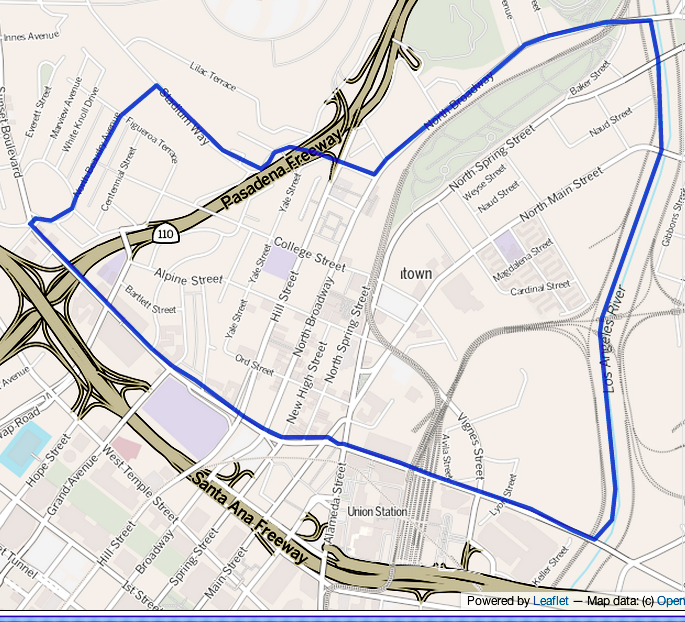
- Map of the Chinatown neighborhood of Los Angeles, as delineated by the Los Angeles Times

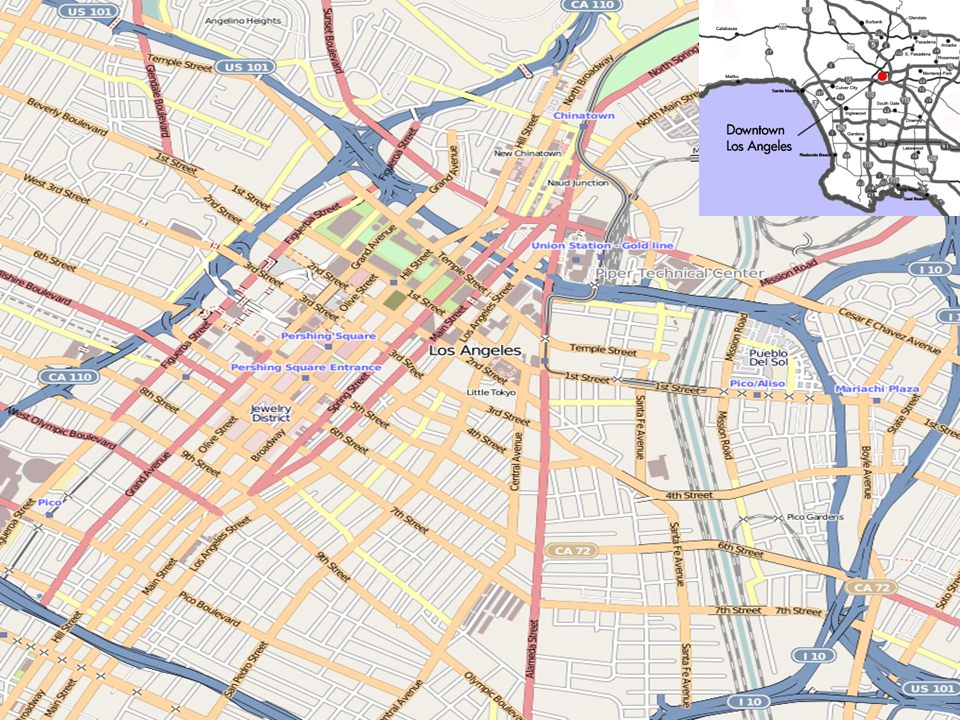
- Location within Downtown Los Angeles
- Coordinates: 34.062888°N 118.23789°W
- Country: United States
- State: California
- County: Los Angeles County
- City: Downtown Los Angeles
- Elevation: 308 ft (94 m)
- Time zone: UTC-8 (PST)
  - Summer (DST): UTC-7 (PDT)
- Zip codes: 90012
- Area codes: 213, 323

Chinatown is a neighborhood north of downtown Los Angeles, California, that became a commercial center for Chinese and other Asian businesses in Central Los Angeles in 1938. The area includes restaurants, shops, and art galleries, but also has a residential neighborhood with a low-income, aging population of about 7,800 residents.

The original Chinatown developed in the late 19th century, and was demolished to make room for Union Station, the city's major ground-transportation center. This neighborhood and commercial center, referred to as "New Chinatown," opened for business in 1938.

In 2026 the neighborhood was ranked the “coolest” in the United States by Time Out.

== Geography and climate ==
According to the Community Redevelopment Agency of the City of Los Angeles (CRA/LA), borders of (the current) Chinatown neighborhood are:

- on the north: Stadium Way and Dodger Stadium/Chavez Ravine, which the L.A. Times includes as part of the Elysian Park neighborhood;
  - in addition, there is a northern sliver along North Broadway between Radio Hill Gardens on the northwest and Los Angeles State Historic Park on the southeast
- to the west and northwest, Beaudry and Figueroa streets and the greater Echo Park neighborhood
- on the east,
  - according to CRA/LA: North Main Street, Los Angeles State Historic Park and industrial areas along the west bank of the Los Angeles River
  - according to the L.A. Times: the Los Angeles River and Lincoln Heights neighborhood
- on the south, Cesar Chavez Avenue and the Civic Center and Los Angeles Plaza historic districts of Downtown Los Angeles

Climate data for Chinatown, Los Angeles
| Month | Jan | Feb | Mar | Apr | May | Jun | Jul | Aug | Sep | Oct | Nov | Dec | Year |
|---|---|---|---|---|---|---|---|---|---|---|---|---|---|
| Mean daily maximum °F (°C) | 68 (20) | 70 (21) | 70 (21) | 74 (23) | 75 (24) | 80 (27) | 85 (29) | 86 (30) | 84 (29) | 80 (27) | 73 (23) | 69 (21) | 76 (24) |
| Mean daily minimum °F (°C) | 47 (8) | 49 (9) | 51 (11) | 53 (12) | 57 (14) | 61 (16) | 64 (18) | 65 (18) | 64 (18) | 59 (15) | 51 (11) | 47 (8) | 56 (13) |
| Average precipitation inches (mm) | 3.47 (88) | 3.81 (97) | 3.24 (82) | 0.85 (22) | 0.31 (7.9) | 0.07 (1.8) | 0.02 (0.51) | 0.14 (3.6) | 0.35 (8.9) | 0.39 (9.9) | 1.16 (29) | 1.98 (50) | 15.80 (401) |

== History ==
Chinatown, Los Angeles
- Points of interest
- Transit
- Parks
- Medical
1 Cathedral High School
2 Pacific Alliance Medical Center
3 (New Chinatown) Central Plaza
4 Chinatown station
5 Thien Hau Temple
6 Chinatown Gateway Monument
7 China City (1938, former site)
8 Philippe's
9 El Pueblo de Los Ángeles Historical Monument
10 Chinese American Museum, site of Old Chinatown

Chinatown can refer to one of three locations near downtown Los Angeles. What is now known as Old Chinatown refers to the original location on Alameda and Macy (1880s–1933). Old Chinatown was displaced by the construction of Union Station, and two competing Chinatowns were built in the late 1930s north of Old Chinatown to replace it: China City (1938–1948) and New Chinatown (1938–present). China City was rebuilt just one year after opening due to a suspicious fire, but another fire in 1948 put it out of business for good.

=== China City ===
China City was a short-lived China-themed district developed by Christine Sterling in 1938.

=== Little Italy ===
The neighborhood that has become Chinatown was formerly Sonoratown and then Little Italy. In the early 20th century, Italian immigrants settled in the area north of the Old Plaza. Many built businesses, including wineries (San Antonio Winery is still in existence). The Italian American Museum of Los Angeles in the El Pueblo de Los Ángeles Historical Monument opened in 2016.

=== New Chinatown ===
In the 1930s, under the efforts of Chinese-American community leader Peter Soo Hoo Sr., the design and operational concepts for a New Chinatown evolved through a collective community process, resulting in a blend of Chinese and American architecture. The neighborhood saw major development, especially as a tourist attraction, throughout the 1930s, with the development of the "Central Plaza," a Hollywoodized version of Shanghai, containing names such as Bamboo Lane, Gin Ling Way and Chung King Road (named after the city of Chongqing in mainland China). Chinatown was designed by Hollywood film set designers, and a "Chinese" movie prop was subsequently donated by film director Cecil B. DeMille to give Chinatown an exotic atmosphere.

During New Chinatown's first-anniversary celebration in 1939, a giant cake featured chop suey lettering. According to researcher Yu Li, Chinese Americans reclaimed the chop suey letterform as a symbol of ethnic pride, using it to challenge racist caricatures like Fu Manchu and reframe their cultural identity.

Central Plaza

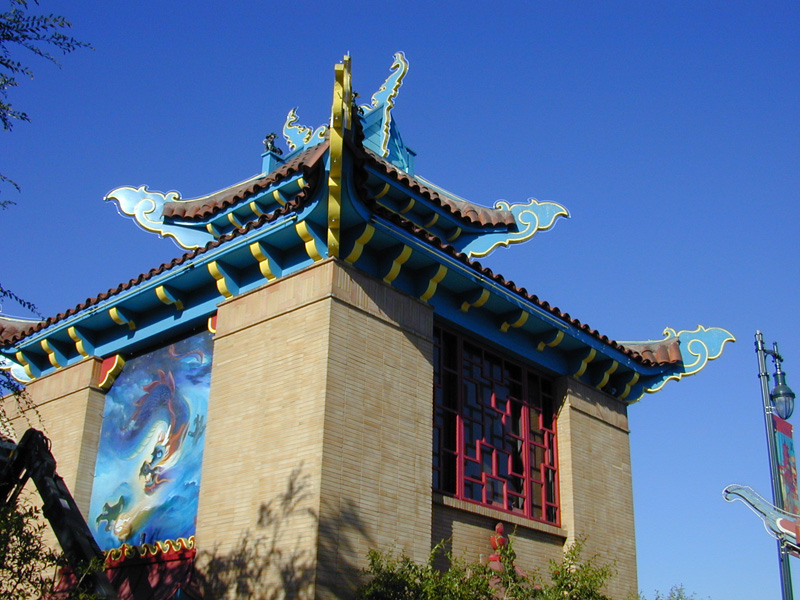
The dragon mural painted by Tyrus Wong and restored by Fu Ding Cheng (1984)

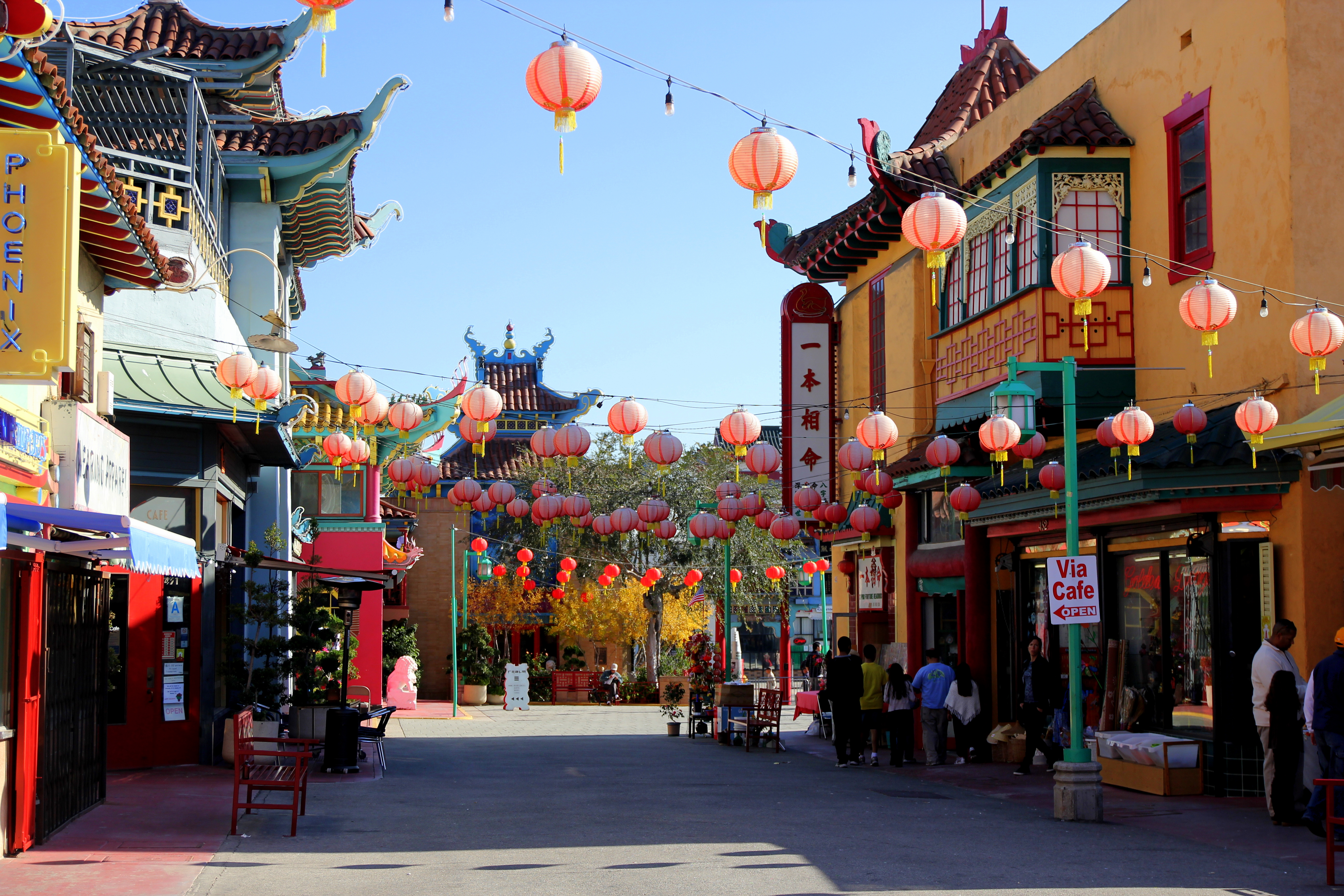
New Chinatown main plaza - Dec 2011

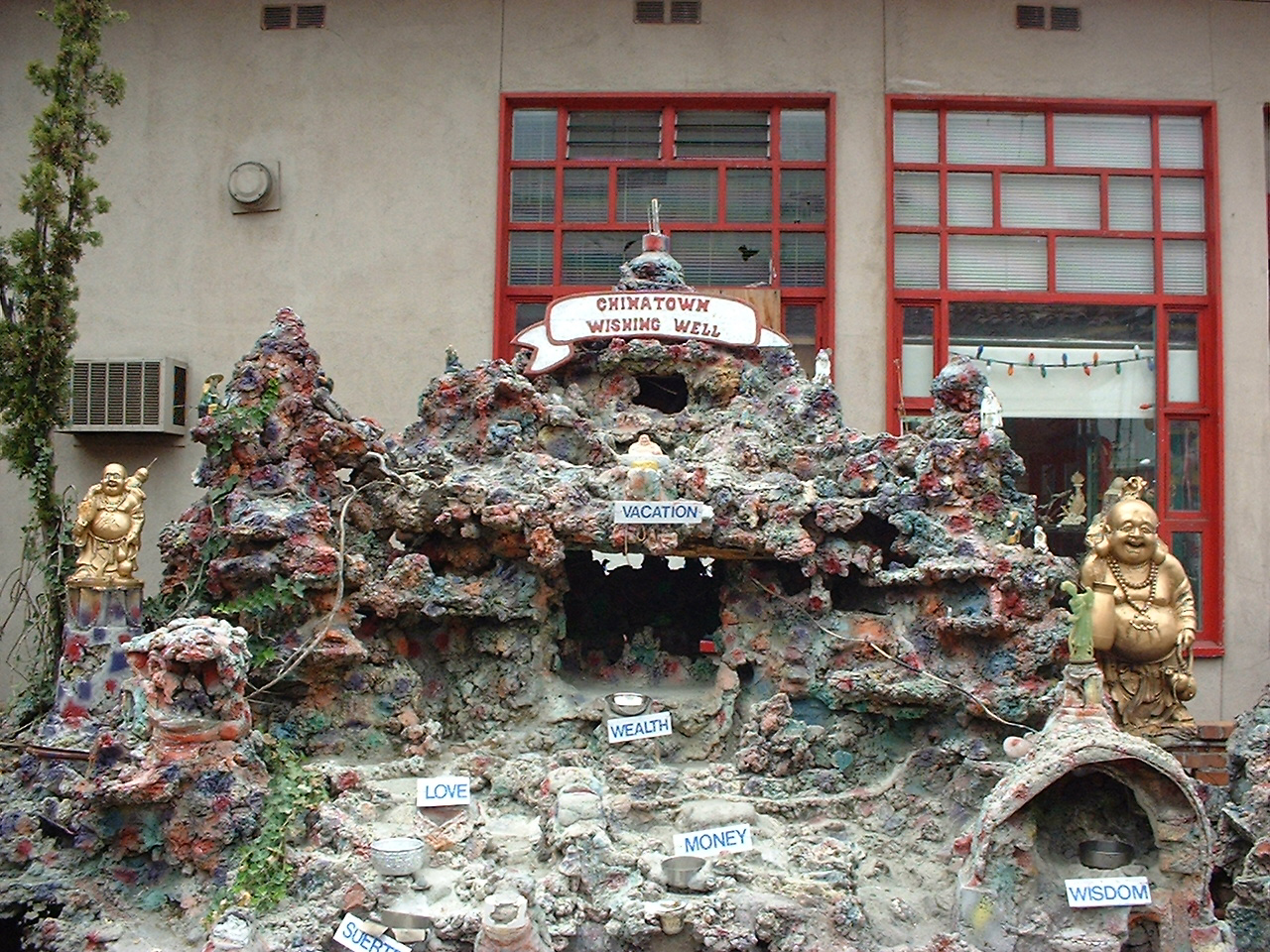
Wishing Well, 2001

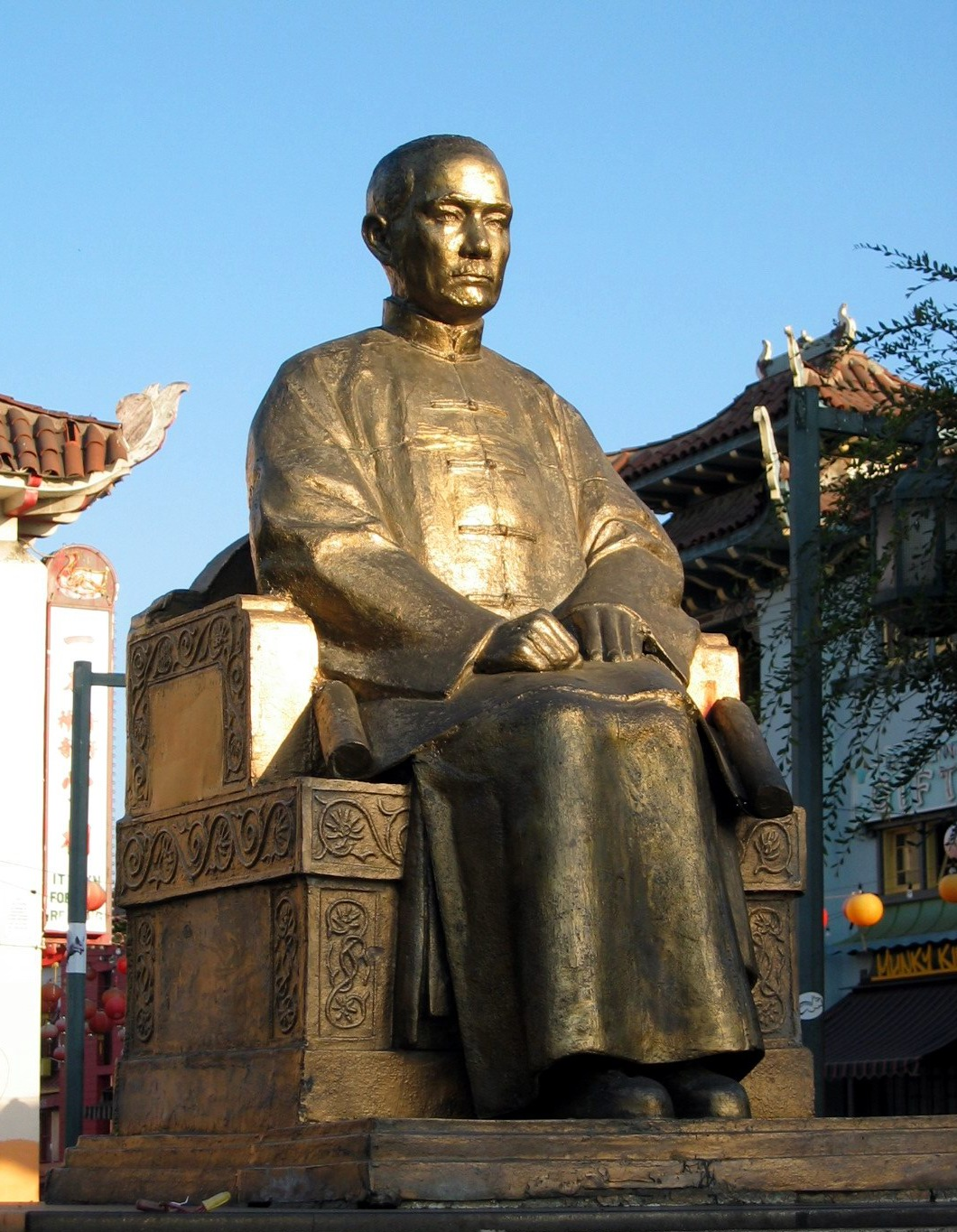
Statue of Sun Yat-sen

The Hop Sing Tong Society is situated in Central Plaza, as are several other Chinatown lodges and guilds. Near Broadway, Central Plaza contains a statue honoring Dr. Sun Yat-sen, the Chinese revolutionary leader who is considered the "founder of modern China". It was erected in the 1960s by the Chinese Consolidated Benevolent Association. A 7-foot tall statue of martial artist Bruce Lee was unveiled at Central Plaza on June 15, 2013.

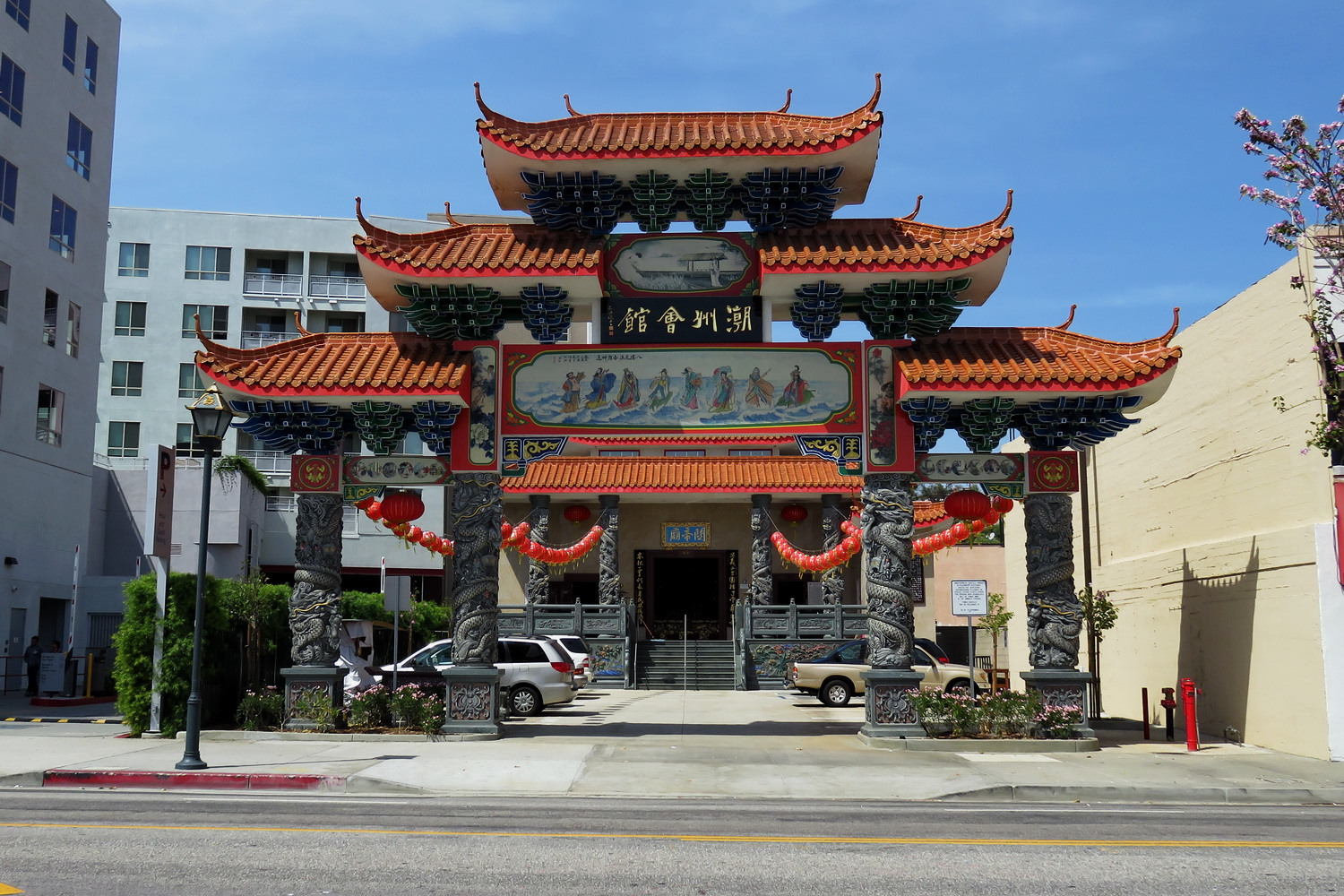
Gateway at Southern California Teo-Chew Association (2016)

During the 1980s, many buildings were constructed for new shopping centers and mini-malls, especially along Broadway. Metro Plaza Hotel was opened in the southwest corner of Chinatown in the early 1990s. A large Chinese gateway is located at Broadway and Cesar Chavez Avenue, funded by the local Teochew-speaking population.

In 1996, Academy Award-winning (for The Killing Fields) Cambodian refugee, physician, and actor Haing S. Ngor was shot and killed in Chinatown during an attempted robbery.

By 2000, many people had left the Chinatown for the City of Monterey Park, which is a part of the larger Chinese community in the San Gabriel Valley. In 2000 AsianWeek said that the Los Angeles Chinatown was "troubled."

On June 28, 2008, a celebration of the 1938 founding of New Chinatown was held with the L.A. Chinatown 70th Anniversary Party. "Though lacking the hustle and bustle of San Francisco's Chinatown, Los Angeles' version has charms of its own."

=== Revitalization with new development ===
The 2010s and 2020s have seen the completion of several large mixed-use and multifamily residential buildings like other neighborhoods in and around Downtown Los Angeles. Activists and city council members were concerned about rising rents and displacement of long time residents, many of them low-income, as these revitalization projects were approved. City officials and housing activists have debated how much affordable housing should be included amidst the market rate apartments and condominiums. Since 2019, the neighborhood has lacked a centrally located grocery store with a large selection, affordable prices and consistently high quality that opens early and closes late.

== Demographics ==
The 2020 U.S. census counted 7,798 residents, with a population density of 19,230 per square mile.

The ethnic breakdown in 2010: Asian, 68.8%; Latino, 14.7%; African American, 6.7%; Non-Hispanic White, 8.7%; mixed race, 0.8%; and others, 2.3%.

The median household income in 2010 dollars ($29,000), was the third-lowest in Los Angeles County, preceded by Watts ($28,200) and Downtown ($24,300). The percentage of households earning $20,000 or less (53.6%) was the third-largest in Los Angeles County, preceded by Downtown (57.4%) and University Park (56.6%). The average household size of 2.8 people was just about the city norm. Renters occupied 91% of the housing units, and home- or apartment owners the rest.

== Economy ==
=== Retail ===
Small, specialized grocery stores are important to the aging population but few remain as gentrification impacts the neighborhood. The Chinese-Vietnamese residents own many bazaars. The stores sell products such as soap, toys, clothes, music CDs at low prices. Several restaurants in Chinatown serve mainly Cantonese cuisine but there are also various Asian cuisine restaurants such as Teochew Chinese, Vietnamese, Indonesian, and Thai, which reflects the diverse character of Chinatown. Few boba cafes have opened in Chinatown, but a large number are to be found in the Chinese enclaves in the San Gabriel Valley.

Dynasty Center, Saigon Plaza, and the Chinatown Phuoc Loc Tho Center feature many Vietnamese-style bazaars with people engaged in bargain shopping for items such as clothing, toys, Chinese-language CDs, pets, household items, funerary products, and so on. Its entrepreneurs are ethnic Chinese from Vietnam.

There are over 20 art galleries to see, mostly featuring non-Chinese modern art, with works from up and coming artists in all types of media.

=== Restaurants ===
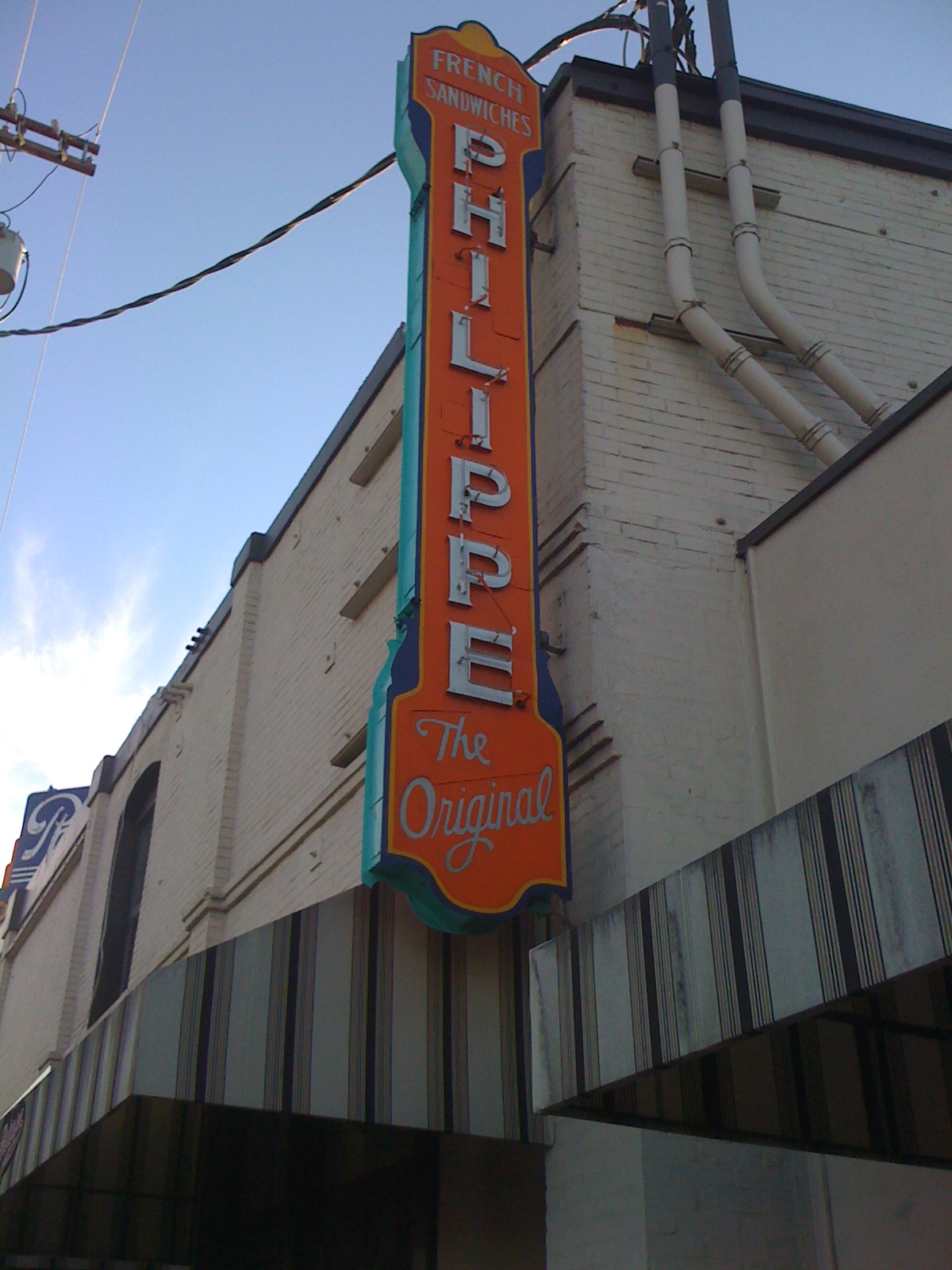
Philippe's sign, 2010

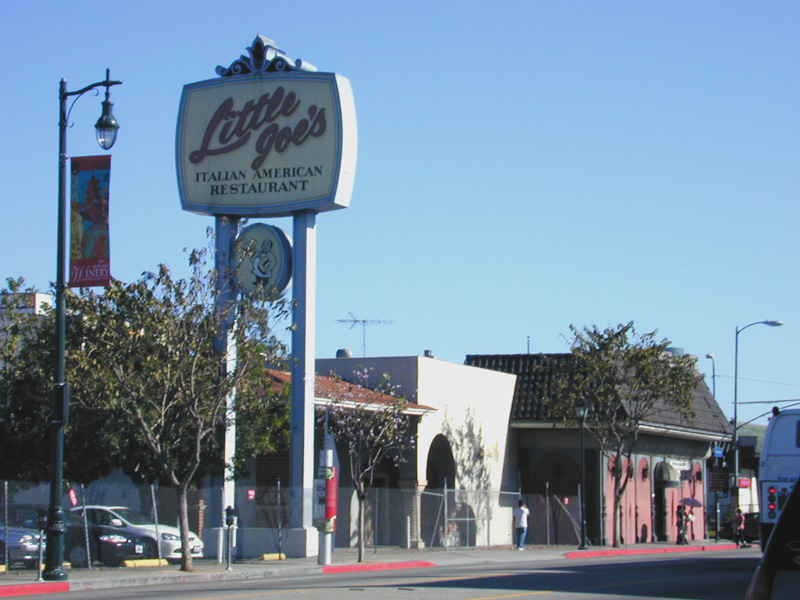
Little Joe's, 2008

Chinatown is in the process of becoming an entirely new place. Chinatown at the height of popularity was filled with bustling Chinese restaurants that included barbecue delicatessens with glass displays of roast duck and suckling pig and Cantonese seafood restaurants with dim sum. As the action in Chinese cuisine became centered in the San Gabriel Valley, there were also places that offered Vietnamese pho noodle soup and banh mi. As downtown revives, Chinatown has been sparked into life by cheap rents, the gallery boom in the 2000s and deep-rooted sense of community. Chinese bakeries and other shops continue to serve the area. Traditional Chinese restaurants that have remained are being joined by a variety of new restaurants as the opportunities Chinatown offers is recognized by additional restaurateurs. The area is better served by transit than many areas with Union Station so close by. Even though low-income seniors remain, college graduates can find their first apartment here and condos are becoming available for the affluent. This economic diversity encourages a diversity of places to serve the area.

Two of Chinatown's most historic restaurants highlight the history and diversity of this neighborhood. Philippe's, known as one of the creators of the French Dip, has been located on Alameda Street at the edge of Chinatown since 1951. Little Joe's was an Italian-American restaurant that pre-dated New Chinatown. Formerly located on the corner of Broadway and College Street, it closed in 1998 and the building was demolished in 2014. The interior was left unchanged and it has been used as a filming location.

== Parks and recreation ==
- Los Angeles State Historic Park, also known as the Cornfield, consists of a long open space between Spring Street and the tracks of the Metro A Line.
- Alpine Recreation Center, at 817 Yale Street, has a combined and multipurpose room with a capacity of 250. Two indoor gymnasiums have capacities of 450 each. There are also basketball courts (lighted/indoor/outdoor), a children's play area and volleyball courts (lighted).

== Nomenclature ==
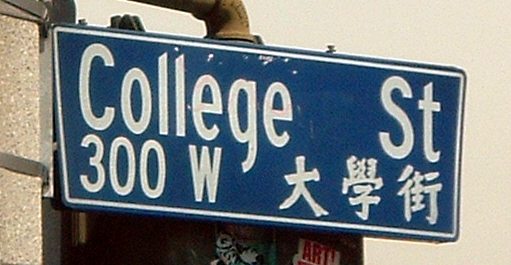
Chinese translation on a street sign at College Street and Broadway. This sign reads in Cantonese Dai hok gai and in Mandarin as Daxue Jie (大學 means college or university).

The words Los Angeles Chinatown are written and pronounced as follows as (traditional Chinese: 洛杉磯唐人街; simplified Chinese: 洛杉矶唐人街; pinyin: Luòshānjī Tángrénjiē; Cantonese Yale: Loksāamgēi Tòhngyàhngāai) in Cantonese, (traditional Chinese: 洛杉磯中國城; simplified Chinese: 洛杉矶中国城; pinyin: Luòshānjī Zhōngguóchéng; Cantonese Yale: Loksāamgēi Jūnggwoksìhng) in Mandarin Chinese or officially known as (simplified Chinese: 洛杉矶华埠; traditional Chinese: 洛杉磯華埠; pinyin: Luòshānjī Huábù; Cantonese Yale: Loksāamgēi Wàhfauh).

== Events ==
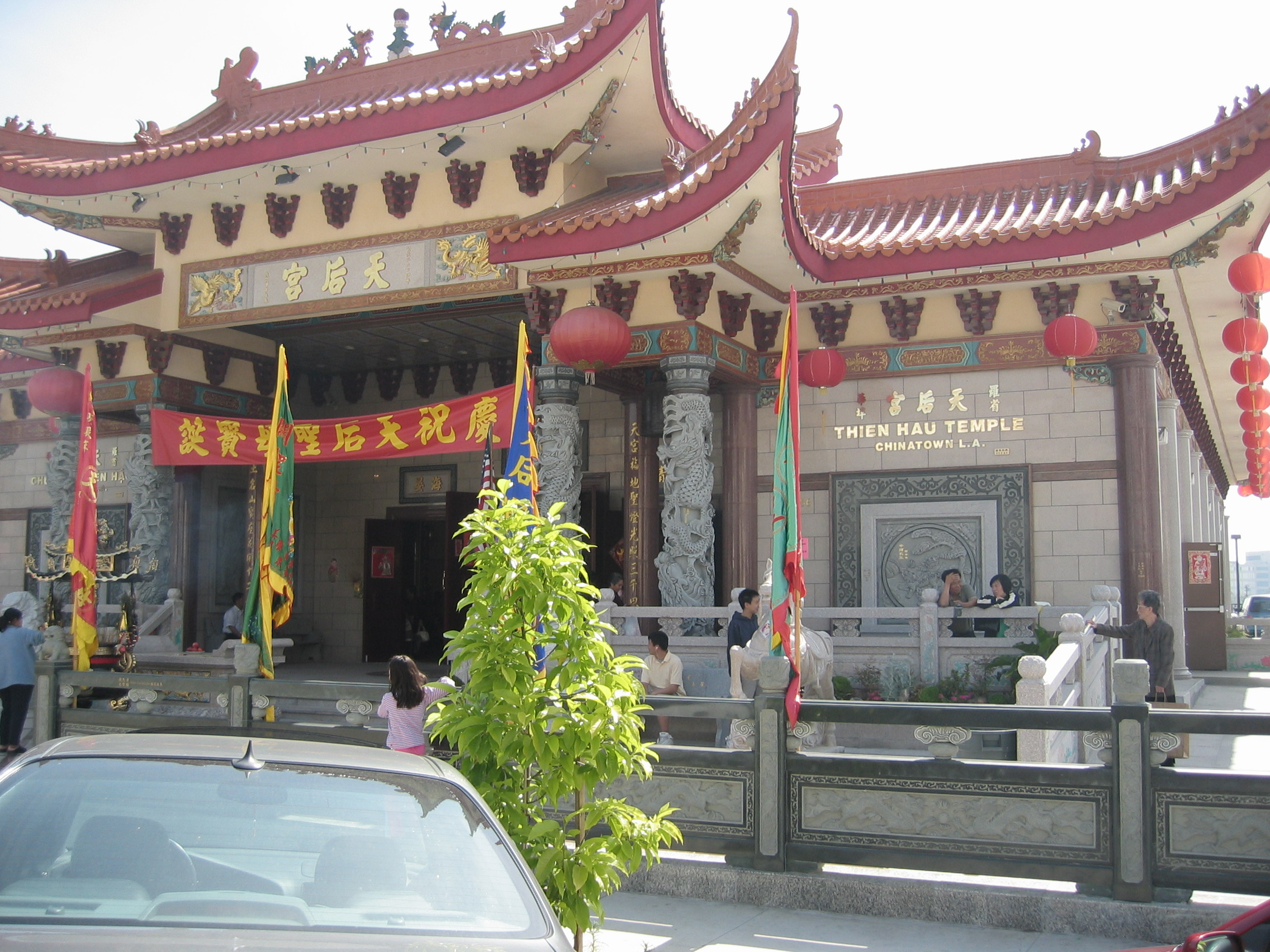
Thien Hau Temple, another popular attraction in LA Chinatown.

Events that have been held or are planned in Los Angeles's Chinatown include:

• Chinese New Year Parade

• Lantern festival at the Chinese American Museum

• The Firecracker Run and Fun Walk

• Mid-autumn Moon Festival

• Miss Los Angeles Chinatown Pageant

A midnight firecracker display occurs every Chinese New Year's Eve at Thien Hau Temple and Xuan Wu San Buddhist Association.

== Education ==
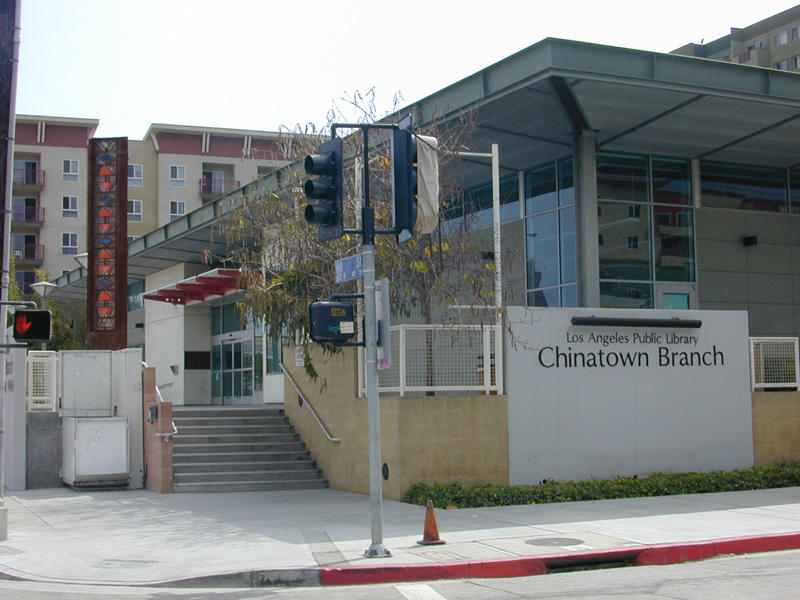
Chinatown Branch Library at Hill and Ord Streets

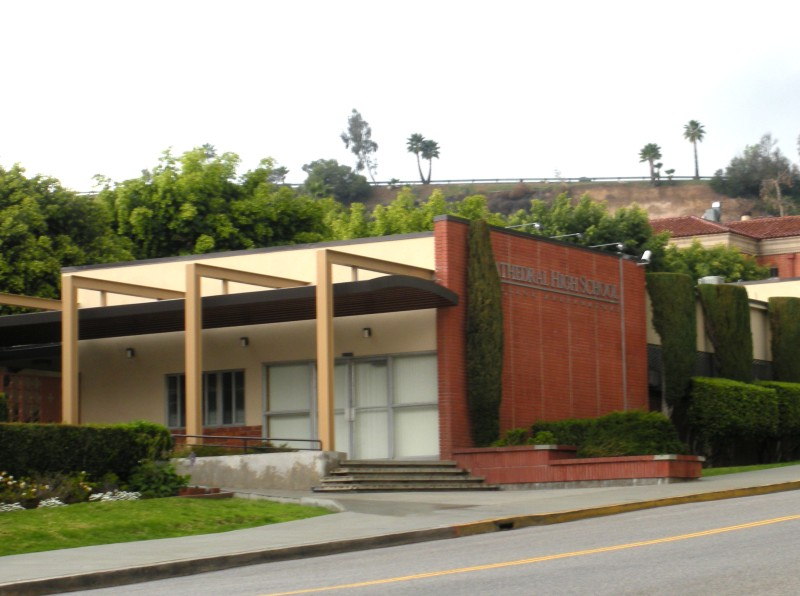
Cathedral High School, next to Dodger Stadium

According to U.S. Census data, 20.2% of Chinatown residents aged 25 and older possessed a four-year degree in 2023. There are three schools operating within Chinatown. They are:

- Endeavor College Preparatory Charter School, middle, 126 Bloom Street
- Castelar Street Elementary School, LAUSD, 840 Yale Street; second oldest school in the district
- Cathedral High School, a private Catholic boys' school, just down the hill from Dodger Stadium, is located on the north side of Chinatown.
- Evans Community Adult School - largest stand-alone ESL adult school in the nation

Los Angeles Public Library operates the Chinatown Branch.

== Transportation ==
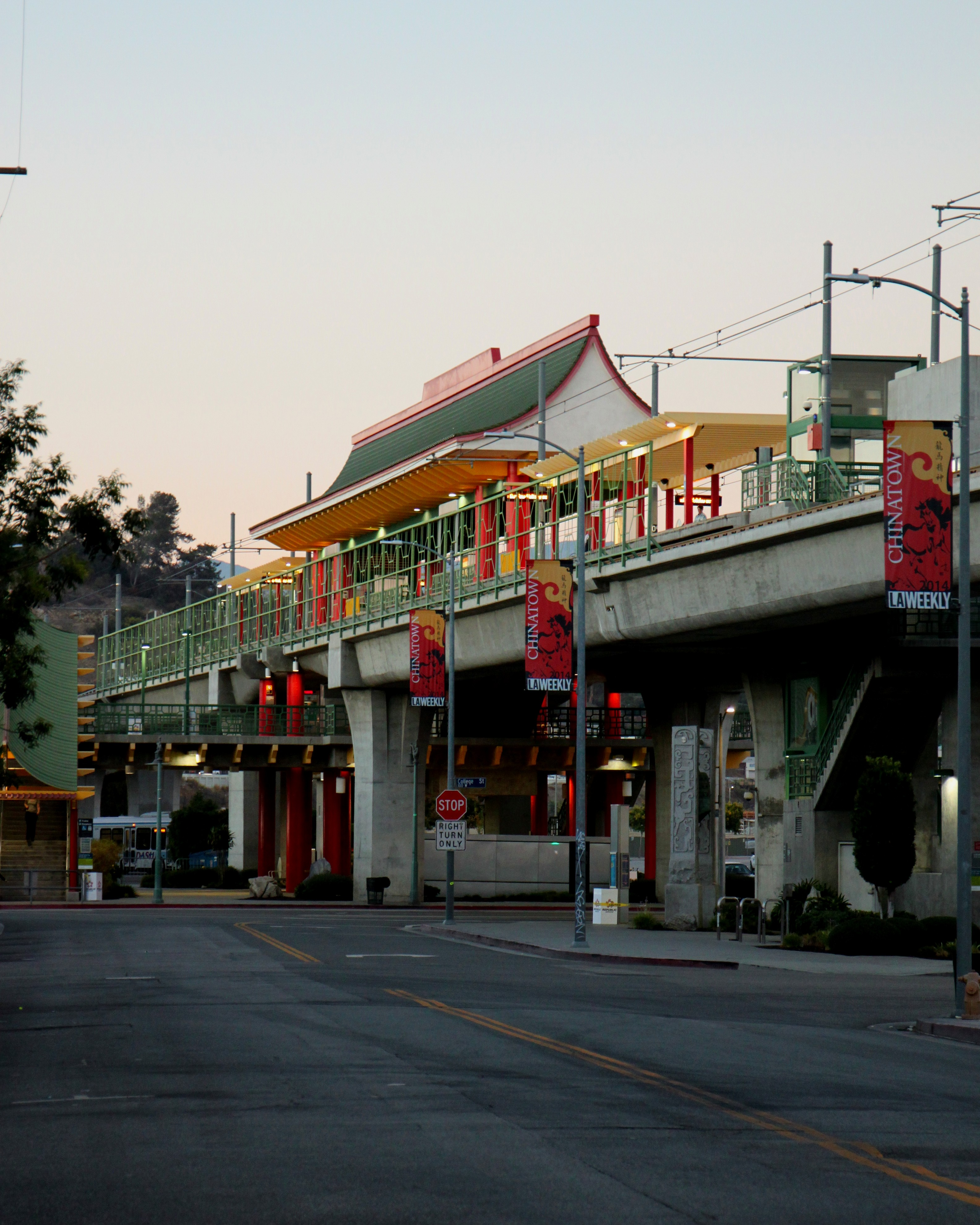
Chinatown station on the A Line (2014)

Chinatown is served by the A Line of the city's Metro Rail. The station was formerly serviced by the, now defunct, L Line; parts of Old Chinatown were uncovered during excavation for another portion of the L.A. subway (the Red Line connection to Union Station). The Metro Rail station in Chinatown has been described as a spectacular pagoda-themed facility and as a cliché of neo-pagoda architecture by Christopher Hawthorne, the Los Angeles Times architecture critic.

== Filming ==
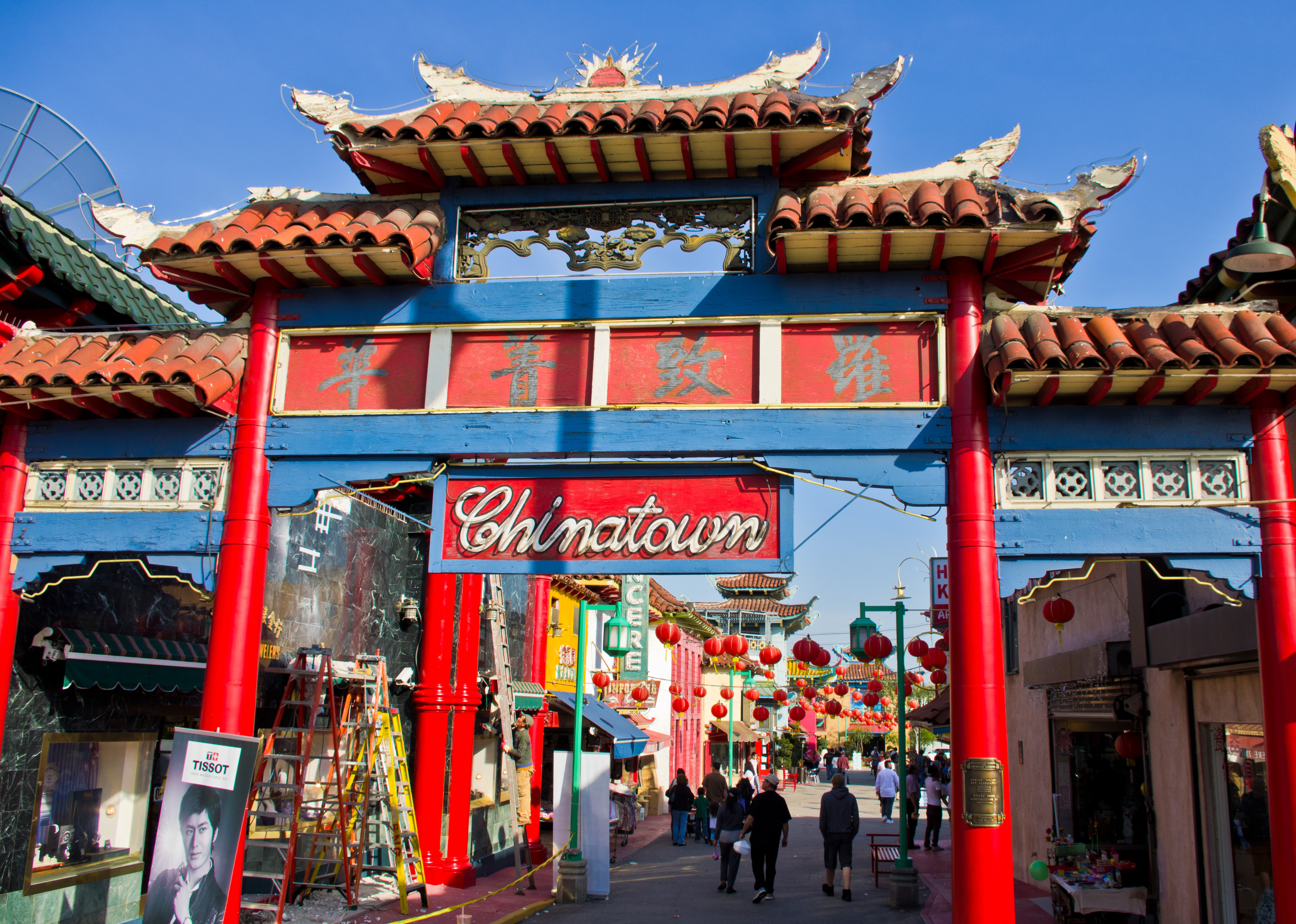
East Gate (top) and West Gate (bottom) in New Chinatown's Central Plaza

Chinatown has served as the setting for many Hollywood films. The conclusion of the film Chinatown was filmed on Spring Street. The movie Rush Hour was filmed on location in Chinatown.

Feature films

- Chinatown
- Rush Hour
- I Love You, Man
- Gangster Squad
- Lethal Weapon 4
- Beverly Hills Ninja
- Strange Days
- Hard to Kill
- Balls of Fury
- 15 Minutes

== Notable people ==
- Cayetano Apablasa (1847–1889), 19th Century property owner
- Helen Liu Fong (1927-2009), architect
- You Chung Hong (1898–1977), attorney, community leader
- Milton Quon, animator, artist and actor
- Bruce Lee (1940 – 1973), actor, whose statue is located at Central Plaza
- Haing S. Ngor (1940–1996), actor
- Yiu Hai Seto Quon (1899–1999), "Mama Quon," chef at Quon Bros. Grand Star Restaurant
- Lisa See, author
- Otto G. Weyse (ca. 1858–1893), liquor and wine dealer, member of the Los Angeles Common Council
- Tyrus Wong (1910–2016), artist
- Wilbur Woo (1915-2012), businessman and leader in the Chinese-American community

== See also ==
- Thien Hau Temple (天后宮) located in Los Angeles's Chinatown
- Chinese American Museum
- Chinese Historical Society of Southern California
- List of Chinatowns
- List of districts and neighborhoods of Los Angeles
- Sonoratown, Los Angeles
- Chinese massacre of 1871

== Sources ==
- American Chinatown: A People's History of Five Neighborhoods, Bonnie Tsui, 2009 ISBN 978-1-4165-5723-4.
- Ki Longfellow, China Blues, Eio Books 2012, ISBN 0-9759255-7-1. Contains detailed history of Chinese immigration to California and other historical information relating to Chinatown. Also, how the Chinese were treated in California.
