= Chinatown East and West Gates =

Gate in Los Angeles, California, U.S.

Chinatown East and West Gate
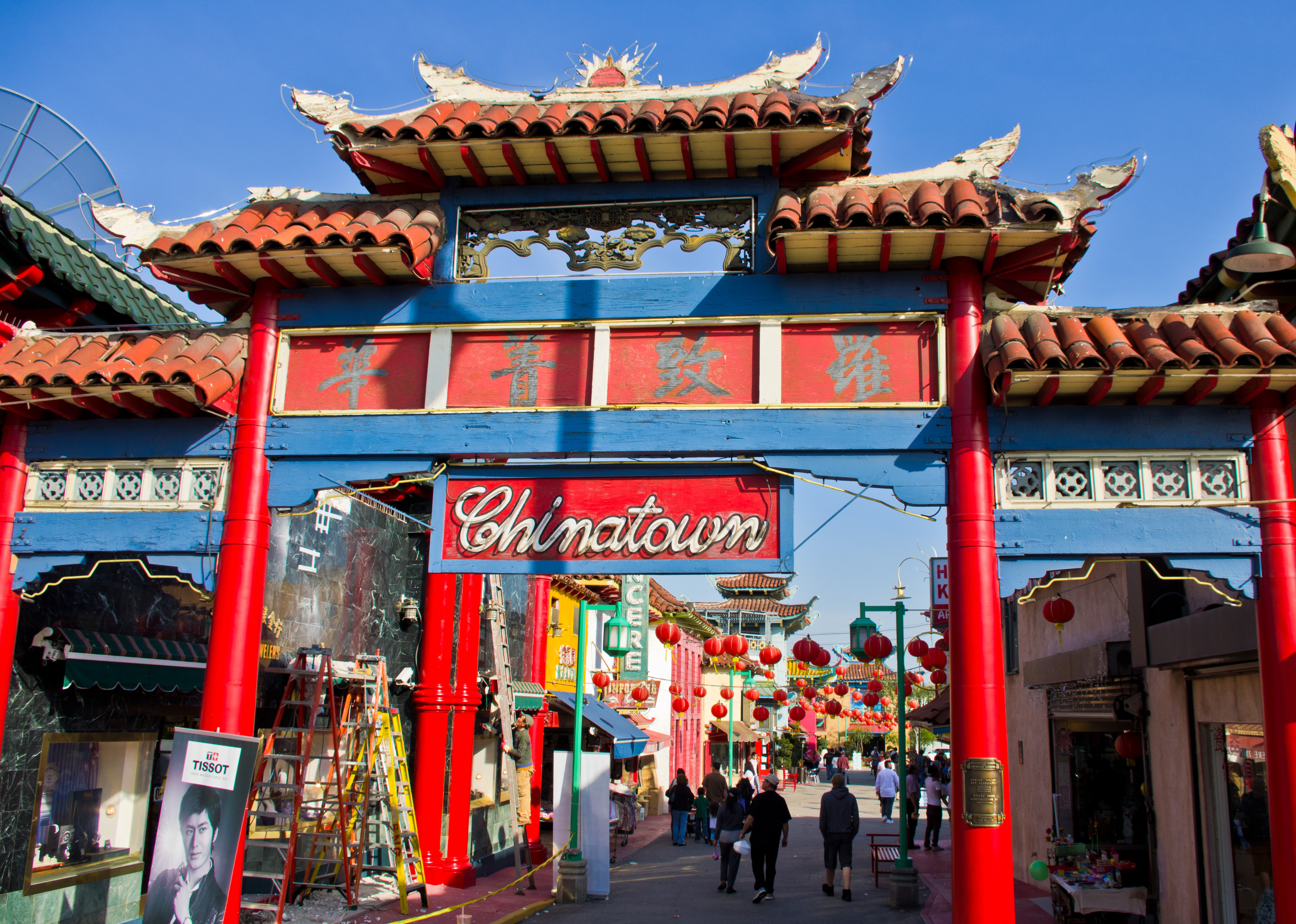
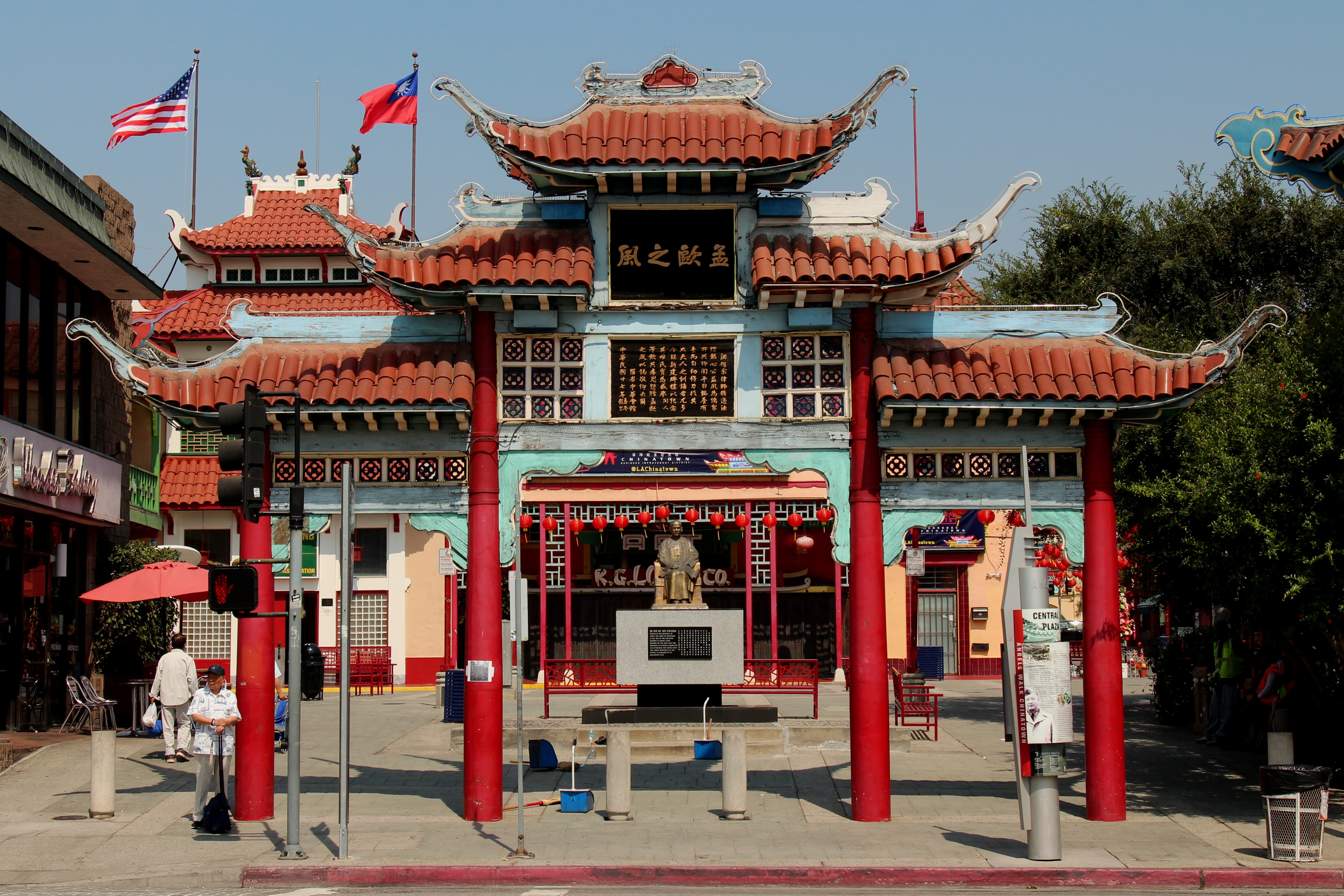
- West Gate (top) and East Gate (bottom)
- Interactive map of the Chinatown East and West Gate area

General information
- Location: Gin Ling Way, Los Angeles, California, U.S.
- Coordinates: 34°3′55.2″N 118°14′13.2″W
- Completed: 1938 (West Gate); 1939 (East Gate)

Design and construction
- Architects: Adrian Wilson, Erle Webster

Los Angeles Historic-Cultural Monument
- Designated: November 2, 2005
- Reference no.: 825 (West Gate); 826 (East Gate)

Chinatown East Gate (also known as Gate of Maternal Virtues and Broadway Gate) and Chinatown West Gate are historic entrance gates located in Los Angeles's Chinatown neighborhood in California. Built in the late 1930s, they were declared Los Angeles Historic-Cultural Monuments in 2005.

== History ==
Chinatown West Gate was unveiled at 954 N. Hill Street in 1938; Chinatown East Gate was unveiled at 945 N. Broadway one year later. The gates, located on each end of Gin Ling Way, mark the entrances to Central Plaza, the heart of Chinatown. East Gate was commissioned by Y. C. Hong to commemorate his mother; the gate is also known as Gate of Maternal Virtues and Broadway Gate. Both gates were built as part of the community's migration from Old Chinatown.

In 2005, Chinatown West and East Gates were designated Los Angeles Historic-Cultural Monuments No. 825 and 826, respectively.

== Design ==
The gates are traditional in design, equally elaborate, and feature 150 year old camphor wood from China. “Cooperate to Achieve”, the motto of Chinese Consul of 1938 T. K. Chang, is written in Chinese on the west gate. Both gates' red color is meant to symbolize good fortune and happiness.

A bronze tablet that commemorates Chinese-American contributions to California's growth was placed by California Governor Frank Merriam at West Gate, and two other plaques play tribute to architects Adrian Wilson and Erle Webster.

== See also ==
- Chinese architecture
- Chinatown Gateway Monument
- History of Chinese Americans in Los Angeles
- List of Los Angeles Historic-Cultural Monuments in Downtown Los Angeles
