= Chinatown Gateway Monument =

Gate in Los Angeles, California, U.S.

- The gate in 2012
- Year: 2001
- Location: Los Angeles, California, U.S.
- 34°3′32.2″N 118°14′24.1″W

Chinatown Gateway Monument is a gateway located at the south entrance to Los Angeles's Chinatown neighborhood in California. It spans Broadway just north of Cesar Chavez Avenue and features gold-painted Qing dynasty-styled twin dragons chasing a pearl, each dragon featuring five fingers on each hand, a symbol of the Emperor. The monument also contains aluminum mesh below the dragons, meant to resemble clouds.

The monument was designed by Rupert Mo and dedicated in 2001. In 2020, Wilder Shaw of Thrillist described it as "infamous".

== See also ==
- Chinatown East and West Gates
