= Yiu Hai Seto Quon =

Chinese-American chef and businesswoman

- Born: October 30, 1899
- Died: July 9, 1999 (aged 99)

Yiu Hai Seto Quon (October 30, 1899 – July 9, 1999), also known as "Mama Quon", was a Chinese-American chef, businesswoman, and community leader in the Chinatown neighborhood of Los Angeles.

== Early life ==
As a young woman in China, Yiu Hai Seto married Him Gin Quon, an American resident whose father Quon Soon Doon (關崇俊) owned a restaurant in the city's Chinatown neighborhood. She stayed in Guangdong, China after Him Gin Quon returned to California; their first daughter Katherine was born there in 1917. She and Katherine joined Him Gin Quon in Los Angeles in 1922.

== Career ==
Quon and her husband opened a restaurant with their sons Frank and Wallace, the Quon Brothers Grand Star Restaurant, in 1946. Mrs. Quon was the chef at the restaurant for many years, adapting Chinese dishes for both Chinese and American diners. She remained active in the kitchen and welcoming guests at Grand Star into her nineties, until a broken hip in 1997 left her too frail to continue.

In her later years, Yiu Hai Quon was often celebrated as a community fixture. In 1984, she featured in a photo exhibit of nine prominent Chinese-American women in Los Angeles, on view at the Kennedy Library at California State University at Los Angeles. She was one of three women honored by the Chinese Historical Society of Southern California in the fiftieth anniversary parade in Chinatown in 1988. And in 1994, she was one of four Chinese-American women spotlighted in a public art project by photographer Carol Nye.

== Personal life and legacy ==
The Quons were parents of nine children, seven daughters and two sons. Yiu Hai Seto Quon was widowed in 1965. She died in the summer of 1999, in Montebello, California; her age at death was variously reported as 99, 101, or 102 years. Her son Wallace Quon, her grandsons Tony Quon and Larry Jung, and her great-grandson Jason Fujimoto have all served on the board of the Los Angeles Chinatown Corporation.

The Grand Star is still in business in Chinatown, now as a bar and jazz club. Stories of Yiu Hai Seto Quon and the Grand Star restaurant are the focus of Natasha Uppal's 2004 short documentary, "One Night at the Grand Star".
