= Statue of Robert the Bruce =

Statue of Robert the Bruce may refer to:

- Equestrian statue of Robert the Bruce, Bannockburn, Stirling, Scotland
- Statue of Robert the Bruce, Stirling Castle, Stirling, Scotland

== See also ==
- Bruce Statue (disambiguation)
- Cultural depictions of Robert the Bruce
