= Little Joe's =

Little Joe's Italian American Restaurant
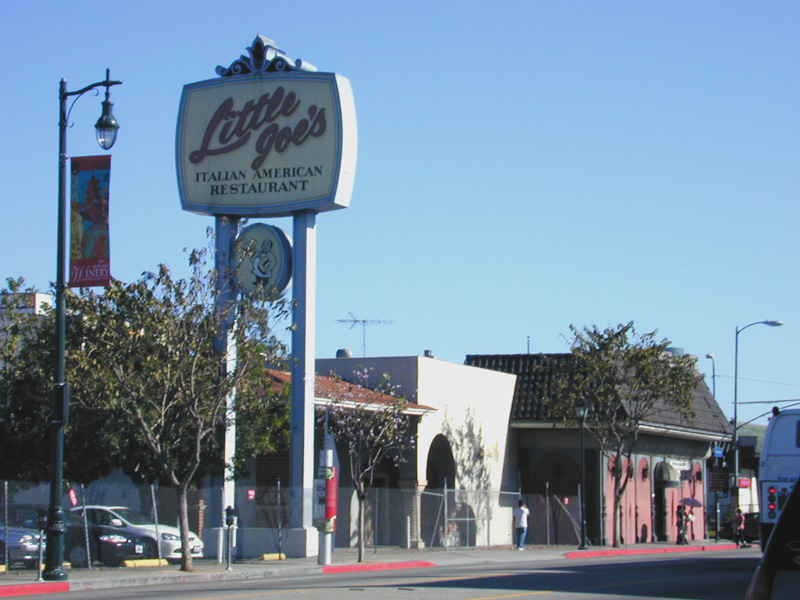
- The former Little Joe's Italian American Restaurant
- Interactive map of Little Joe's Italian American Restaurant

Restaurant information
- Established: 1928
- Closed: 1998
- Food type: Italian-American
- Location: 904 North Broadway, Los Angeles, Los Angeles, California, 90012, United States
- Coordinates: 34°3′51″N 118°14′13″W

Little Joe's Italian American Restaurant was a historic Italian-American restaurant which once stood in the Chinatown district of Los Angeles, California USA at the corner of Broadway and College Street. The area was once part of the city's Italian American enclave, which preceded Chinatown.

== History ==
Italian-born Charles Viotto started a grocery store at the corner of 5th and Hewitt streets. After marrying Charles Viotto's daughter, Mary, Robert Nuccio took over that store, and in 1895 renamed it The Italian-American Grocery Company.

In 1923, Robert Nuccio (the youngest of 12 children) took his children Chel and John back to Italy, to talk his family into moving to America. Before he left, he sold the grocery to his friends down the street, John Gadeschi and Joe Vivalda. They moved the grocery store to North Broadway in 1927.

When Union Station began construction, the Italian immigrants building it began coming by the grocery store for lunch and John started making sandwiches for them. The rough-hewn nature of the Italian laborers was keeping the ladies away from their shopping, so John and Joe opened a restaurant next door. Now the men could get their lunch without disturbing the women at their shopping.

When Italy sided with Axis powers in World War II, many Italian businesses changed their names; for example the Bank of Italy was renamed as the Bank of America. The Italian-American Grocery Company became Little Joe's, named after Joe Vivaldi. Little Joe's was not affiliated with any other restaurant of that same name.

When Gadeschi's daughter, Marion, married John Albert Nuccio - Robert's son - the Nuccio family was once again involved with the restaurant. John, who had been in law school at USC before the war, went to work for his father-in-law at the restaurant after serving in World War II.

The business remained under control of the Nuccio family until it closed in 1998. At the time of the closure, Little Joe's was operated by the third generation of Nuccio men: Steve, Bob and Jay. Jay went off on his own to open The Crazy Horse, a West Covina-based country-and-western bar and eatery. That left Steve and Bob to operate Little Joe's.

== Closure ==
The restaurant closed in December 1998. The owners, having waited in vain for a revitalization of Chinatown and Downtown as a nighttime dining destination, decided that it was time to retire. The revitalization of nearby Old Pasadena made it increasingly difficult for downtown establishments to compete for evening diners.

As part of the revitalization movement of Chinatown, plans were put in place to turn the site of the restaurant into a retail and residential hub with a large car parking structure. On December 2, 2013, Forest City Enterprises began demolishing Little Joe's to start the construction of a new $100 million real estate development, the Blossom Plaza project. The Plaza, in the works for over a decade, will feature a large-scale five story apartment building over ground level shops. Demolition of the long-abandoned restaurant was finally completed on January 17, 2014.

When excavation began on the site for the Plaza project, a 100-foot-long (30 m) section of the Zanja Madre was found and destroyed by rushed and careless work to clear the development site. The original water main for the early City of Los Angeles, it conveyed water from the Los Angeles River from near what is now Griffith Park for use by the early residents.
