= Statue of Sun Yat-sen (Los Angeles) =

Statue in Los Angeles, California, U.S.

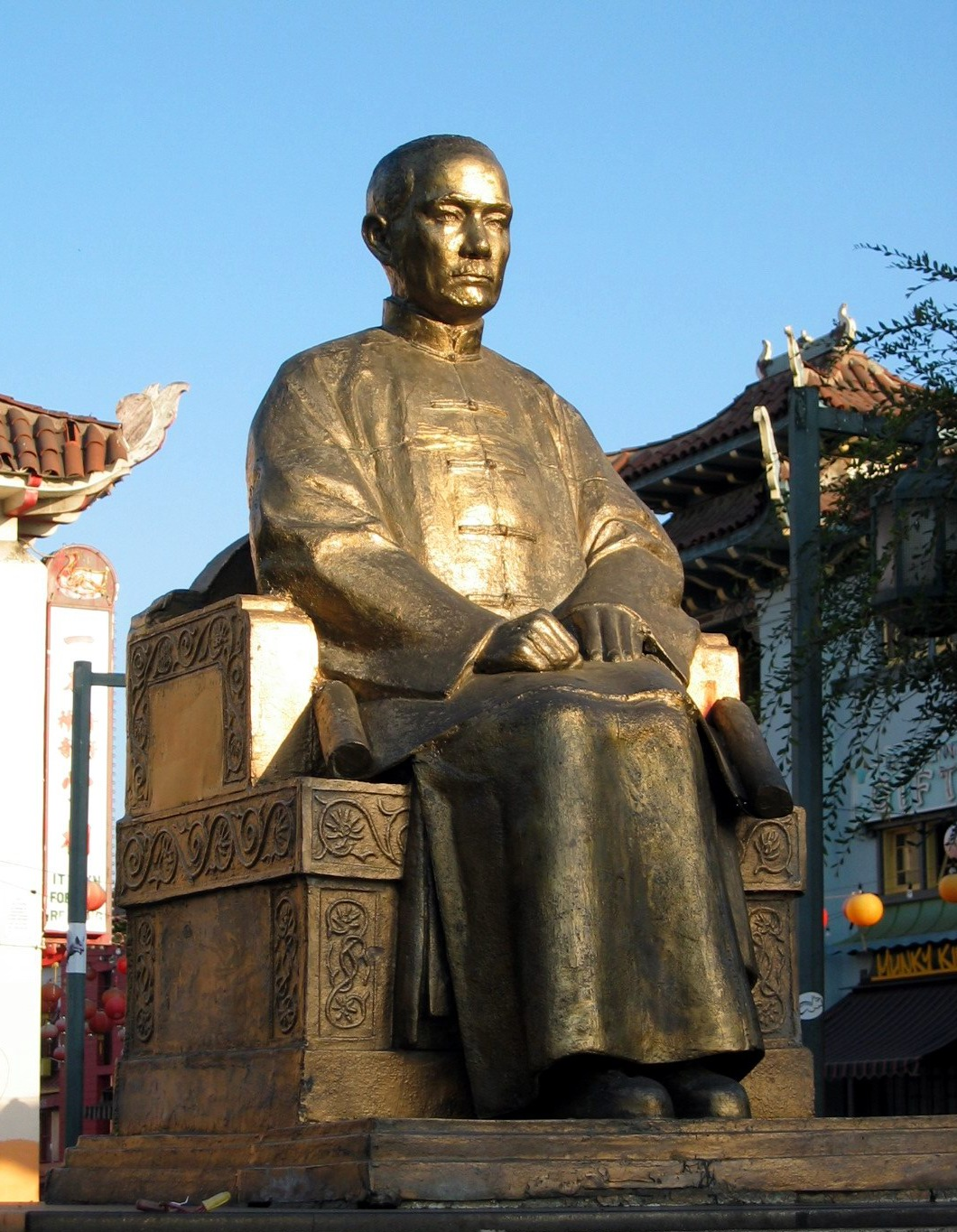
- Subject: Sun Yat-sen
- Location: Los Angeles, California, U.S.; 34°3′55.3″N 118°14′13.6″W

A statue of Sun Yat-sen is installed in Chinatown, Los Angeles, in the U.S. state of California.
