= Italian American Museum of Los Angeles =

Museum in Los Angeles, California

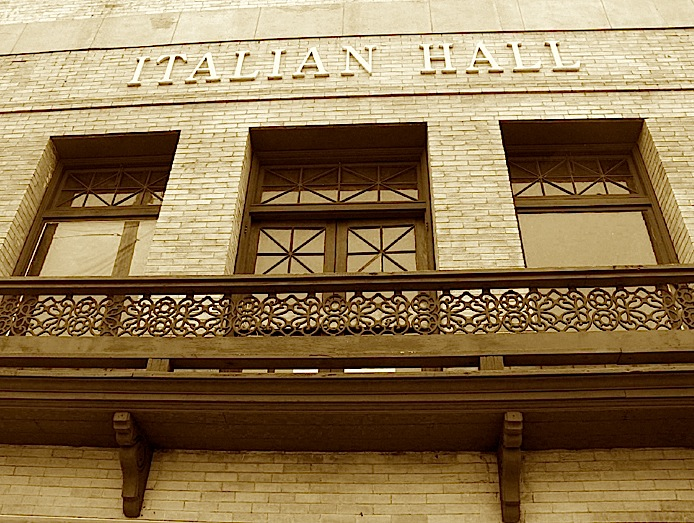
- Established: 1988
- Location: Los Angeles, California
- Coordinates: 34.056681°N 118.23809°W
- Type: Historical
- Website: www.italianhall.org

The Italian American Museum of Los Angeles (IAMLA) is a museum located in downtown Los Angeles, California, and is part of the El Pueblo de Los Ángeles Historical Monument. It is dedicated to the history, experience and continuing contributions of Italian Americans and Italians in Southern California and the United States, and is the first such museum in Southern California. The museum opened in 2016.

The 6,000 sq. ft. museum is located in downtown Los Angeles and features a permanent exhibition, as well as temporary exhibitions, arts and cultural programming, and educational resources.

== Location ==
The museum is located in the Italian Hall, a historic building listed on the National Register of Historic Places constructed in 1908 to serve as the cultural center for the Italian community. It is part of a site known as El Pueblo de Los Angeles Historical Monument, the birthplace of Los Angeles and home to some of the oldest structures in the city as well as museums, public art, and the Olvera Street Mexican marketplace. Today, the Italian Hall is the oldest surviving structure from Los Angeles' Little Italy, and the museum occupies a total of 6,000 square feet (560 m^{2}) inside it.

== History ==
The museum project was first conceived in 1988 soon after which a support group was formed to raise funds to develop a museum. In the project's first phase, nearly $2 million was raised to restore the Hall. The museum is funded by the Historic Italian Hall Foundation, a non-profit organization incorporated in 1993, the City of Los Angeles and private donors.

== Exhibits ==
The museum is interactive and documents the history and ongoing contributions of Italian Americans through exhibitions and a variety of programming. It features historical and art exhibitions, an oral history and a research archive. It has a permanent exhibition that explores the history of Italian Americans in the United States and is also presented online via the Google Cultural Institute.

Past exhibitions have included the following:

- Sunshine and Struggle: The Italian American Experience in Los Angeles, 1827-1927 (2009), which showcased hundreds of never-before-published photographs and historical artifacts pertaining to the Italian American presence in Los Angeles.
- The Sicilian Cart: History in Movement (2017), an exhibition of Sicilian carts in collaboration with the Museum of Sicilian Carts (MUSCA) of Sicily and Dolce & Gabbana.
- Italianità: Artists of the Italian Diaspora Examine Identity (2018), which featured a century of work from artists such as Joseph Stella.
- Leo Politi's Los Angeles: Works of Love and Protest (2019), an exhibitions on the work of Caldecott Medal-winning author and illustrator Leo Politi.
- Fantasy World: Italian Americans in Animation (2019 - 2020) presented the Italian American creators of cartoon characters and series such as The Flintstones, Tom and Jerry, Woody Woodpecker, and Archie.
- St. Joseph's Tables: Expressions of Devotion, Charity and Abundance (2020), an exhibition on the Saint Joseph's Day food altar custom.
- Woven Lives: Exploring Women's Needlework from the Italian Diaspora (2022) examined the evolution of needlework, tracing its origins in Italy and examining its significance in Italian and Italian American life.
- A Real Boy: the Many Lives of Pinocchio (2023) explored the cultural origins, adaptations, and appeal of Pinocchio.
- Louis Prima: Rediscovering a Musical Icon (2023–2024) surveyed the life and legacy of Louis Prima, an Italian American jazzman, songwriter, and performer.

== Awards and other recognition ==
The museum won the Award of Merit for California from the American Association for State and Local History in 2017.

== Events ==
Each year, the museum sponsors the annual fundraiser Taste of Italy Los Angeles.
