= Statue of Bruce Lee (Los Angeles) =

Statue in Los Angeles, California, U.S.

Bruce Lee statue
- The statue in 2015
- Interactive map of Bruce Lee statue
- Location: Chinatown, Los Angeles
- Coordinates: 34.065109°N 118.237426°W
- Material: Bronze
- Height: 7 ft (2.1 m)
- Opening date: June 15, 2013
- Dedicated to: Bruce Lee

A statue of Bruce Lee is located in Chinatown, Los Angeles, commemorating the martial artist of the same name.

== History ==
The 7-foot bronze sculpture of Bruce Lee was created by an unknown artist in Guangzhou, China and depicts Lee in a martial arts stance and holding nunchucks. It was transported to Los Angeles, California after a five-year effort by Lee's daughter Shannon, and is the only statue of her late father in the United States. Its unveiling occurred on June 15, 2013 to a crowd of hundreds, including ground-breaking Asian American actor James Hong. It was permanently installed on a commemorative pedestal and unveiled on September 28, 2018 at a ceremony attended by Shannon Lee and California State Senator Kevin de Leon. Its permanent installation will not occur until the erection of spectator seating and a concrete plinth.

Although born in San Francisco’s Chinatown, Lee opened a martial arts school in Los Angeles' Chinatown and was a fixture there during the filming of the 1960s television series The Green Hornet. The statue is located near the pedestrian intersection of Sun Mun Way and Jung Jing Road in Chinatown's Central Plaza, not far from the life-size 1961 bronze statue of Sun Yat-Sen. Weighing in at about 1,595 pounds (723.47 kg), the Bruce Lee statue has become a cultural mecca for Lee's fans, who are regularly seen taking selfies while poised in martial arts stances.

== See also ==
- List of public art in Los Angeles
- Statue of Bruce Lee (Hong Kong)
- Statue of Bruce Lee, Mostar
