= Thien Hau Temple (Los Angeles) =

Chinese temple in Los Angeles, California

- 天后宮
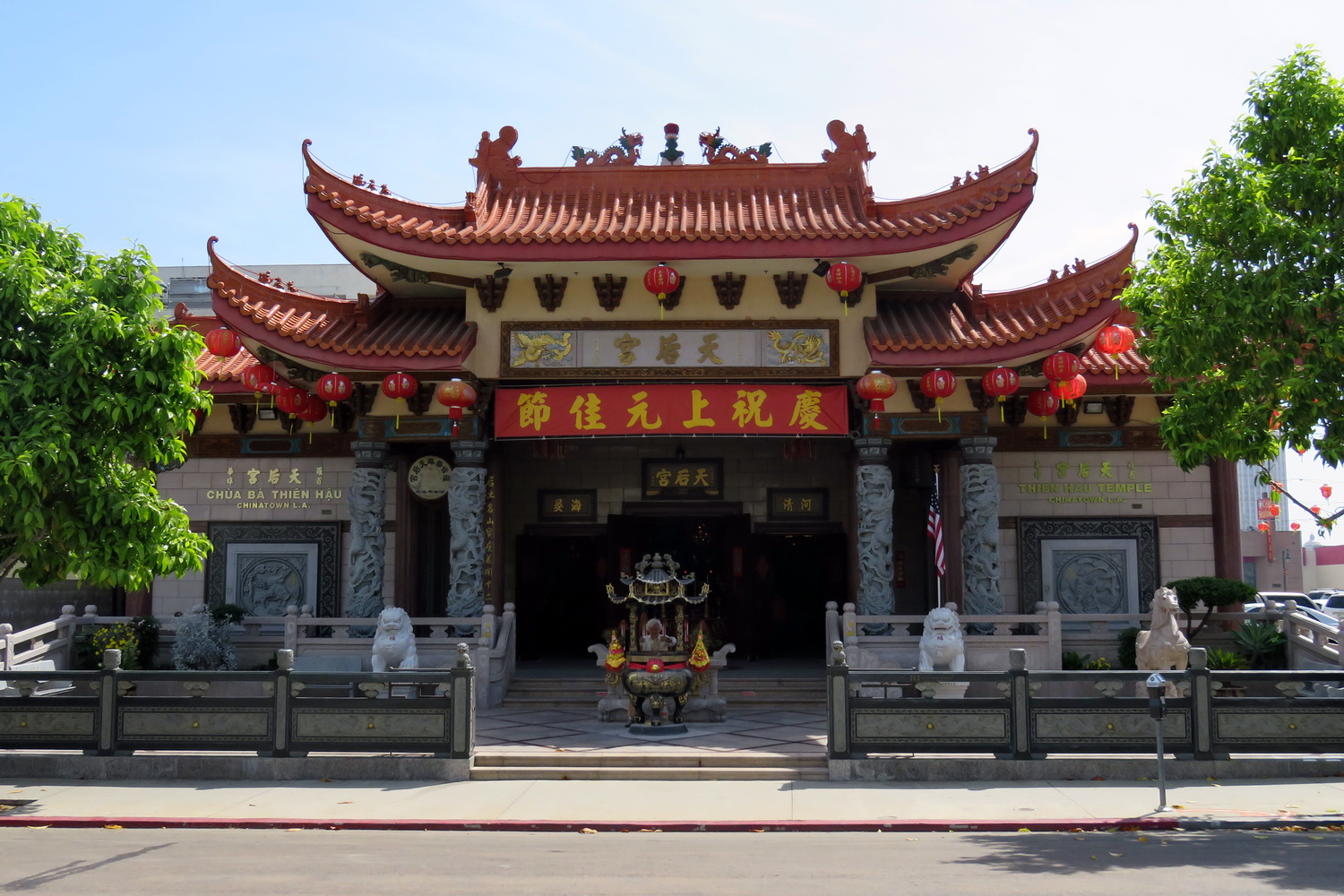
- Thien Hau Temple

- Location within the Los Angeles metropolitan area

Religion
- Deity: Mazu

Location
- Country: United States
- Interactive map of Thien Hau Temple
- Coordinates: 34.0626°N 118.2407°W

Thien Hau Temple

Chinese name
- Traditional Chinese: 羅省華埠天后宮
- Simplified Chinese: 罗省华埠天后宮
- Literal meaning: Heavenly Empress Palace of Los Angeles Chinatown
Transcriptions
Standard Mandarin
- Hanyu Pinyin: Luóshěng Huábù Tiān hòu gōng
- Wade–Giles: lo-sheng hua-pu t'ien hou kung
Southern Min
- Teochew Peng'im: lo5 sên2 hua5 bou1 tiêng1 hao6 gêng2

Vietnamese name
- Vietnamese alphabet: Chùa Bà Thiên Hậu
- Chữ Hán: 天后宫

The Thien Hau Temple is a Chinese temple located in Los Angeles's Chinatown in California, dedicated to the ocean goddess Mazu. It is one of the more popular areas for worship and tourism among Asian residents in the Los Angeles area. In addition to Mazu, the temple also venerates the martial deity of justice, Guan Sheng Di Jun (關聖帝君) and the wealth deity Fu De Zheng Shen (福德正神).

== History ==
The temple is affiliated with the Camau Association of America, a local benevolent, cultural and religious association primarily serving the local Teochew Chinese–Vietnamese refugees from Cà Mau province, Vietnam. The group also supports Chinese, Vietnamese, and Thai Chinese communities.

The original building of the temple was a former Italian Christian church located within what was formerly Little Italy, the building was purchased and remodeled by the Camau Association in the 1980s. The three main images of Mazu, Guan Yu, and Fu De were imported from Vietnam and dedicated in 1990. Under a strong faith-based community in and outside of Chinatown, the temple was able to raise a great deal of donated money with which to build a larger temple hall. Construction of the new temple was completed and dedicated in September 2005, a memorial hall for the enshrinement of ancestors was consecrated the following month.

== Services ==
Thien Hau Temple is usually festive on the commemoration days of various deities, especially Mazu.

On the eve of Chinese New Year, members from various communities gather to receive blessings and to burn incense in worship of the Deities. Lion dance will be performed and firecrackers are popped in order to ward off any evil spirits. Representatives from over 25 family associations headquartered in Chinatown and other communities are present to light the firecrackers at the stroke of midnight. Since the temple is located within the heart of Chinatown, the temple is often seen as the local "Times Square" to celebrate the Chinese New Year. Many people come to the temple especially during the first week after New Year to receive a blessing for the year. On the concluding day of the New Year celebrations, people come to the temple to pray and beckon Mazu for blessings and protection for the rest of the year.

In recent years, a large number of non-Asian visitors have equaled the number of Asian visitors and congregants who assemble at the temple during the New Year celebration.

On weekends and the 1st and 15th day of the lunar calendar, food is provided to the general public for free (with the option to give a donation to the temple). The temple also holds a Zhong Yuan Festival ceremony in the summer.

In 2020, all services for that year were cancelled for the first time in the temple's history due to the COVID-19 pandemic. The temple reopened to the public on a limited basis in early 2021 under new safety guidelines.
