= Statue of Bruce Lee (Hong Kong) =

Statue in Hong Kong

Bruce Lee statue
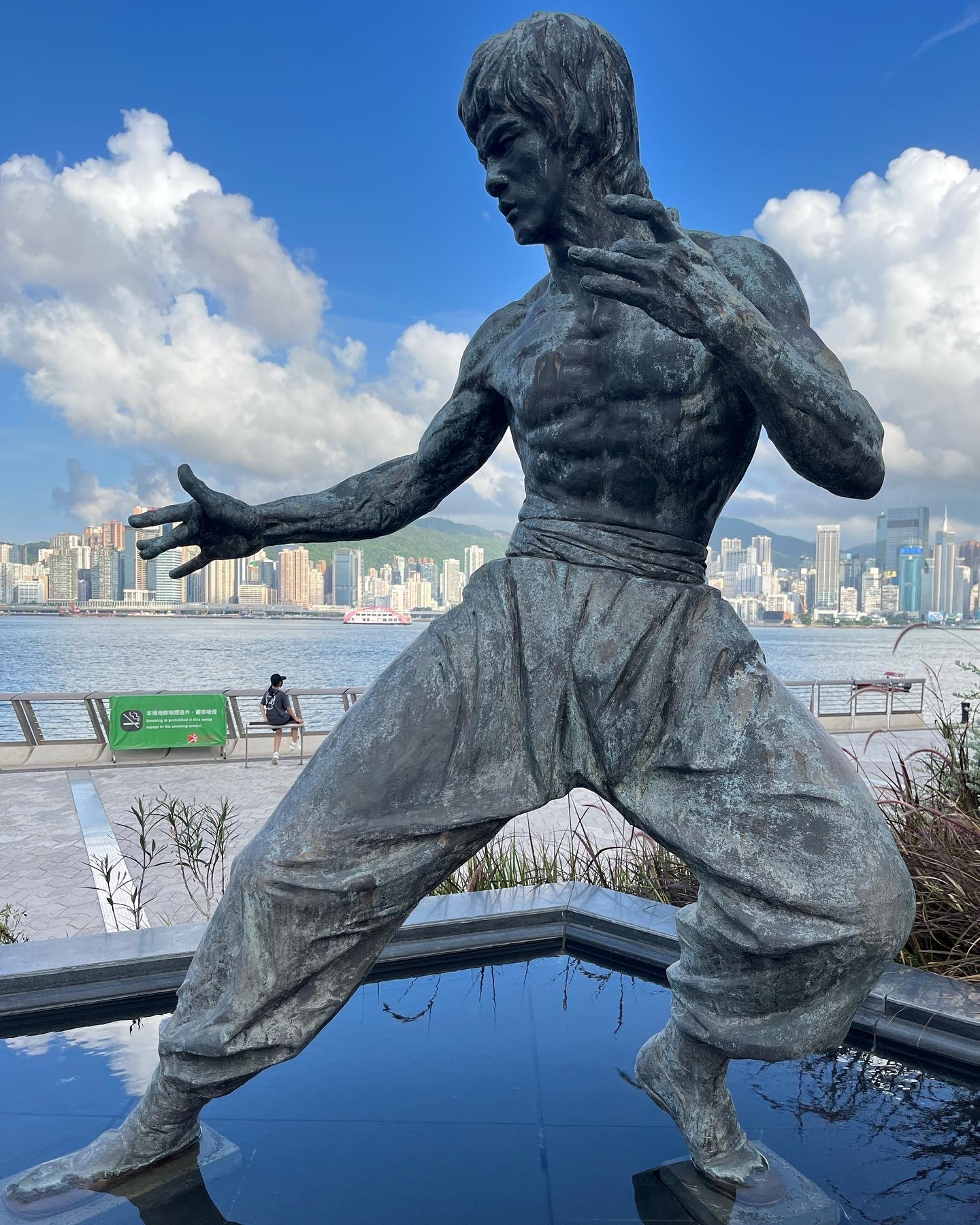
- Bruce Lee's statue in Hong Kong in 2023
- Interactive map of Bruce Lee statue
- Location: Avenue of Stars, Tsim Sha Tsui, Hong Kong
- Coordinates: 22.2938754°N 114.1755487°E
- Material: Bronze
- Completion date: 27 November 2005
- Dedicated to: Bruce Lee

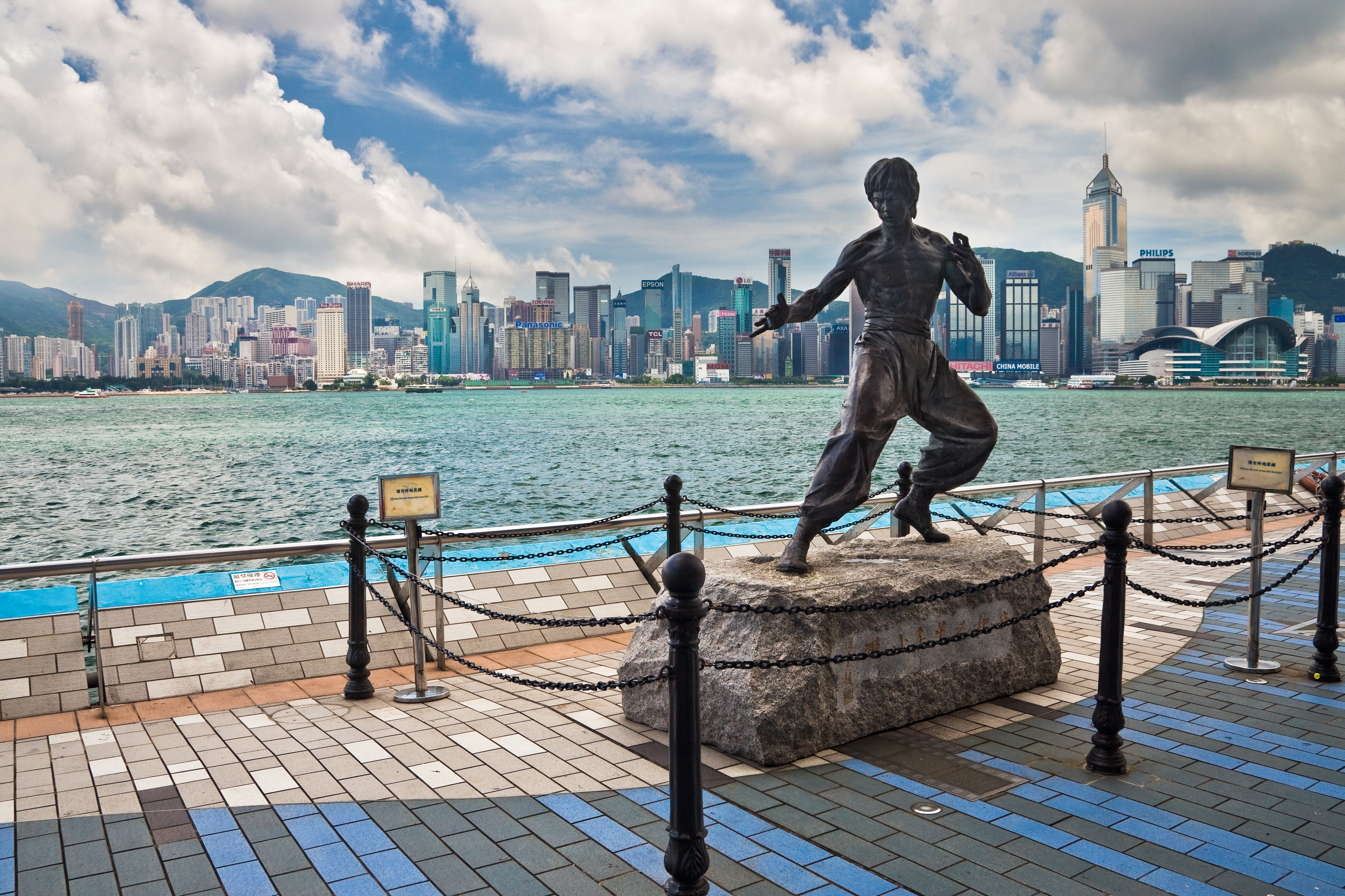
The statue in 2009, seen on the Avenue of Stars

The Bruce Lee statue in Hong Kong is a bronze memorial statue of the martial artist Bruce Lee, who died on 20 July 1973 at the age of 32, created by sculptor Cao Chong-en, and located on the Avenue of Stars attraction near the waterfront at Tsim Sha Tsui.

== History ==
The Hong Kong Bruce Lee Club raised US$100,000 for a statue to be erected after pleas to the government to honour his legacy. A 2.5 m (8.2 ft) bronze statue by artist Cao Chong-en was erected along the Avenue of Stars attraction near the waterfront at Tsim Sha Tsui. It shows a classic 'ready to strike' Bruce Lee pose, as seen in the 1972 movie Fist of Fury. Hew Kuan-yau, a member of the Bruce Lee Fan Club Committee, said, "We want the people to know about the legend of Bruce Lee." The statue was unveiled by Bruce Lee's brother Robert Lee on 27 November 2005, celebrating what would have been Bruce's 65th birthday.

The statue was featured on the tenth leg of the American reality TV show The Amazing Race 17, the tenth leg of The Amazing Race Norge 1, and the third leg of The Amazing Race Canada 2. It was also featured in a Bengali detective movie Tintorettor Jishu at the end of the movie when Feluda and his team pays their respects to the legend.

== See also ==
- Statue of Bruce Lee (Los Angeles)
- Statue of Bruce Lee (Mostar)
