= Statue of Bruce Lee, Mostar =

Statue in Mostar, Bosnia and Herzegovina

Bruce Lee statue
- Interactive map of Bruce Lee statue
- Location: City park of Zrinjski, Mostar
- Coordinates: 43.3428°N 17.8042°E
- Designer: Ivan Fijolić
- Completion date: 26 November 2005
- Dedicated to: Bruce Lee

A statue of Bruce Lee was unveiled on 26 November 2005, in the city of Mostar, Bosnia and Herzegovina, by sculptor Ivan Fijolić. Located in Zrinjevac City Park, the life-sized statue stood 1.68 m (5 ft 6 in) tall, shorter than Bruce Lee's actual height of 1.72 m (5 ft 8 in), and was a symbol of solidarity in the ethnically-divided city until it was stolen in a heist on March 4, 2024, and was subsequently found albeit cut in pieces.

== History ==
The statue was the first public monument to Bruce Lee unveiled in the world, with a statue in Hong Kong being revealed one day later, marking what would have been the Hong Kong American star's 65th birthday.

The project of the statue was spearheaded by Mostar Urban Movement, a youth group headed by Nino Raspudić and Veselin Gatalo, who saw the statue as "an attempt to question symbols, old and new, by mixing up high grandeur with mass culture and kung fu." In a city that had been torn in war by ethnic divisions, the dynamic movie star was a symbol of "loyalty, skill, friendship, and justice." Lee was "far [enough] away from us that nobody can ask what he did during World War II" and "part of our idea of universal justice–that the good guys can win". Lee, although an American of Chinese descent and famous martial arts actor, represented at least one thing that could bridge the divide between Mostar residents: "One thing we all have in common is Bruce Lee."

The unveiling ceremony of the statue saw the attendance of local Bruce Lee fans, representatives of the German government, which had bankrolled the project, as well as Chinese officials. Martial arts is popular among the youth population in Herzegovina, especially competitive mixed martial arts where Croatian Mirko Filipović is an international star.

Shortly afterward, the sculpture was vandalized, removed for repairs, and brought back at the end of May 2013. Both Bosniaks and Croats had complained that the statue was a provocation because they thought it was pointed towards their side of the city in a fighting stance, so its creators rotated the statue to face a neutral direction.

On March 3, 2024, the statue was stolen in a heist, and remained missing until it was found by police six days later. The suspect had cut it into pieces and planned on selling it as scrap metal.

== See also ==
- Statue of Bruce Lee (Hong Kong)
- Statue of Bruce Lee (Los Angeles)
- Rocky statue in Žitište
