= Walnut Valley (disambiguation) =

Walnut Valley is a valley in California.

Walnut Valley may also refer to:

- Walnut Valley Festival, a music festival in Kansas
- Walnut Valley (Highgate, Virginia), a historic farmstead
