= L67 =

L67 may refer to:

- L67 Supercharged, a Buick V6 engine : see Buick V6 engine#L67 Supercharged
- HMIS Indus (L67) (pennant number L67, later U67), a 1934 Royal Indian Navy Grimsby class sloop
- HMS Bedouin (F67) (pennant number L67, later F67), a World War II British Royal Navy Tribal-class destroyer
- HMS Border (L67), the original name of Hunt III class destroyer Greek destroyer Adrias
- a bus service from Barcelona to Esparreguera and serving also El Papiol
- Rialto Municipal Airport FAA LID
