= Sonny Everett =

American aviator and broadcaster

M. A. "Sonny" Everett is an American aviator, author and broadcaster, including color commentary announcing of airshows and special events. Sonny's broadcasting career began in 1960 as a summer high school job at WCRV in Warren County, NJ. His first airshow announcing duties came in 1963 at North Philadelphia Airport (PNE) at the age of 17.

Combining his broadcast abilities with an inherent knowledge of aviation, Sonny became the USA's foremost color-commentator of airshows and aviation events throughout the Seventie's, Eightie's and Ninetie's. As background, he produced the famous Bicentennial barnstorming troupe called "Air Show America", featuring aviation notables Bill Barber, "Big Ed" Mahler (Mennen Special) and then newcomer Leo Loudenslager in a two-hour choreographed-to-music airshow re-creating those of Hollywood combined with the reality of the 1920s–1930s. Sonny remains in demand for airshows and aviation events.

Sonny authored the coffee-table book Fliers, published in 1987, a photo-history of airshows from the barnstormer days through modern times. He has often been a guest on numerous TV and radio talk shows, and serves as an expert commentator on aviation safety matters.

Sonny appeared several times on TV's Mike Douglas Show and was featured in a principal acting role in the films Cloud Dancer (1980) starring David Carradine and Oscar-winner Jennifer O'Neill, and stunt performer in Moving Violations (1986) starring Sally Kellerman and Robert Conrad.

As a pilot Sonny has accrued several thousand flying hours in over 60 types of aircraft, from gliders to cropdusters to widebody Boeing jetliners. He has served on the ALPA Air Safety & Accident Investigation committee and developed audio/visual training programs for pilots during a 30-year career with USAirways (formerly Allegheny Airlines).

As of April 2010, Sonny contributes to and announces for charitable special events and can be heard on WZCC radio in the Ocala-Gainesville market (#82). Sonny resides in Citrus County, FLA and devotes much of his time to music and writing for a variety of aviation journals.

In 2015, Sonny Everett was inducted into the Air Show Hall of Fame of the International Council of Air Shows Foundation.
