= Cloud Dancer =

- 1980 theatrical poster for the US
- Directed by: Barry Brown
- Written by: Barry Brown; William Goodhart; Daniel Tamkus
- Produced by: Barry Brown; Dick Reed; Scott M. Siegler; Melvin Simon
- Starring: David Carradine; Jennifer O'Neill; Joseph Bottoms
- Cinematography: Travers Hill
- Edited by: Marshall M. Borden; Allan Holzman
- Music by: Fred Karlin
- Production company: Modern Film Effects
- Distributed by: Blossom Pictures
- Release date: January 1, 1980 (US)
- Running time: 104 min.
- Country: United States
- Language: English

Cloud Dancer is a 1980 aviation drama film directed by Barry Brown. The film stars David Carradine, Jennifer O'Neill and Joseph Bottoms. Cloud Dancer follows a competition aerobatics pilot throughout his show season.

== Plot ==
Brad Randolph is the world champion aerobatics pilot but now, in his early 40s, he faces many challenges to maintain his position. He begins to have nosebleeds during his competitions, is diagnosed with hypertension, and the doctor recommends he not expose himself to strong G-forces anymore.

Intertwined with Brad's professional struggles is his relationship with photojournalist Helen St. Clair, who suddenly reappears after a year. He makes clear to her his intention of not getting married due to his dangerous profession and above all, of not having children, without explaining why. Helen is wary of telling him that while she was away she gave birth to his son. Brad's problems are compounded by the presence of a young competitor, Tom Loomis, whom Brad himself had encouraged to try aerobatics and quit drug smuggling.

So, Brad faces difficult decisions. There are some vicious drug dealers using a fighter airplane to ground down drug-smuggling planes to take their cargo, will he do something about it? Will he continue to compete despite his failing health and the death of a colleague due to G-LOC, something he risks himself? And, what will happen with Helen?

== Cast ==
- David Carradine as Brad Randolph
- Brice Dill as Brad Randolph Jr
- Jennifer O'Neill as Helen St. Clair
- Joseph Bottoms as Tom Loomis
- Colleen Camp as Cindy
- Albert Salmi as Ozzie Randolph
- Salome Jens as Jean Randolph
- Norman Alden as Dr. Putnam
- Nina Van Pallandt as Caroline Sheldon
- James T. Callahan as Walt Lawson
- Hoyt Axton as Brad's mechanic
- Woodrow Chambliss as Curtis Pitts

== Production ==
Director Barry Brown met aerobatic pilot Tom Poberezny in England, during the 1970 FAI World Aerobatic Championships, where he had the idea for the plot. It took several years for him to get financing and resolve the technical problems of filming with cameras that could withstand more than 3 g for actual competition-level maneuvers.

The film had a budget reported as of $3.5 million dollars, crediting the cooperation of organizations like the Experimental Aircraft Association, Piper Aircraft, Goodyear, and Narco Avionics. (Note: Narco [sic] Avionics is listed by bloomberg.com as founded in 1980, for the manufacturing of search and navigation equipment (Sub-Industry, Aerospace & Defense), and located in Fort Washington, PA.)

Director Barry Brown, who also produced the film, co-wrote the story, and designed the aerial sequences, is a pilot and aeronautic engineer. Therefore, he wanted to ensure a film on aerobatic flying was authentic. Cloud Dancer's stunts were performed in real airplanes by real pilots, without the use of models or the still rare CGI. Two Pitts biplanes were specially built by Aerotek-Pitts in Afton, Wyoming, to include lightweight built-in cameras, able to resist up to 12 g, invented by Brown. The camera mounts were built into the primary structure of the airplanes: a tripod mount on the top wing, another on the handhold of the top wing of the S-2, wing mounts, side fuselage mounts, a tail mount, and one between the cockpits of the S-2 for close-ups of the rear seat occupant. These airplanes alone flew 160 hours for the filming. The shooting of the movie was in April 1978.

The technical advisor and chief pilot for Cloud Dancer was the former world champion aerobatic pilot, Tom Poberezny, who appears in the film as himself; together with Charlie Hillard, also named in the film, they made most of the flying for the film. The third member of the "Red Devils" Aerobatic Team, Gene Soucy, is also named in the film. Crowd scenes were shot at actual air shows in the Phoenix area, specifically, the ones at Falcon Field ("First Annual Arizona Festival of Flight," April 2), Chandler (April 5), and Deer Valley ("Festival of Flight," April 8–9). The film counted with the appearance of famed air show announcer Sonny Everett as himself.

The movie also had the participation of pilots Leo Loudenslager, and Jimmy Leeward, this one piloting his own Mustang P-51. The film is dedicated to pilot Walt Tubb, who cameoed as a chief judge, and died a few months after the filming (coincidentally while performing the same maneuver he did in the movie that causes the death of one of the characters) and to another twelve "fallen airmen whose example made Cloud Dancer possible."

The cast was subjected to actual flying conditions, so their reactions are authentic. The scene in which Brad Randolph takes Helen St. Clair for her first aerobatic ride was the first time actress Jennifer O'Neill had that experience. It is reported that actor Joseph Bottoms became so fascinated with flying that he gained his pilot's license, and went solo during production in a Decathlon. As for David Carradine, he learned to taxi a Pitts, and during the many acrobatic maneuvers in which he flew in the back seat of the airplane to film his acting and facial distortions, he endured severe airsickness. It is also reported he became a proficient pilot. (Note: David Carradine's version of the filming: "My next epic turned out to be Cloud Dancer, a movie about aerobatic flying, essentially gymnastics in an airplane. The writer/director, Barry Brown, wanted me very badly. He told me I wouldn't have to fly the plane. I told him that sounded boring and I wasn't interested. He said, incredulously, "You mean you want to do your own flying?" I said, "Yeah, that would make it more interesting." Barry had originally placed the movie with Warner Bros. but they wouldn't believe he could shoot the aerial footage for real. They wanted to fake it all on a sound stage. Barry wanted to show the effects of gravity on my face, which is considerable. Without the effects, it just wouldn't be realistic. He put me together with some of the best aerobatic pilots on the planet, notably Art Scholl, the absolute master of them all, and then Tom Poperesney [sic], a member of the Red Devils, the greatest of the prop plane synchronized teams. I also got to go up with The Blue Angels, the Navy jet team. Almost all of these guys have since died in their planes, an occupational hazard. During the difficult maneuvers you black out. Usually you come to in a few seconds, but it only takes one time that you don't and you're history. I went through the course very quickly. It got easier once I stopped throwing up.")

It took two years of editions and re-editions for Cloud Dancer to find distribution.

=== Aircraft ===
The aircraft featured in Cloud Dancer included a single-seat S-1S and a two-seat S-2A Pitts Specials as the airplanes piloted by the leading characters through most of the movie. The three Pitts Specials of the "Red Devils" Aerobatic Team are seen on the ground. Also, a Mustang P-51 is the fighter plane that appears in pursuit of a Piper PA-28R-201T Turbo Arrow III in a climactic scene. Other aircraft included were Christen Eagle, and Piper PA-350 Navajo.

Airplanes seen in the background are: Stearman PT-17 Kaydet, Cessna 140, Cessna 172M, Raytheon A 36 Bonanza, Lake LA-4 Buccaneer. Also, there can be seen a Ford Trimotor 5-AT, two Boeing B-17, and the Douglas A-4F Skyhawk of the Blue Angels, the United States Navy's aerobatic team.

=== Music ===
Emmy Award winner composer Fred Karlin provided the film score plus three original songs: Sainted Angel, Cloud Dancer, and It's So Easy, the first two with lyrics by Academy Award and Grammy Award winner Norman Gimbel. The songs were performed by Gene Cotton, in duet with Mary MacGregor in It's So Easy.

Singer-songwriter Hoyt Axton, who played the role of Brad's mechanic, wrote and sang You Taught Me How to Cry, and Talkin' Lady Mechanic Blues, the second one co-written with guitar maker and musician S.L. Mossman, who cameoed in the film as Mechanic Nº2. Mark Dawson contributed his song The Heart You Break (May Be Your Own). (Note: Not to be confused with Patsy Cline's song of a similar title. The movie's ending credits list Mark Dawson as the author of the words and music, same as does Library of Congress entry nºEU679257 from Catalog of Copyright Entries: Third series. (May 18, 1976), which gives the copyrights (and the copyrights of another six songs of his authorship) to Lady Jane Music, Hoyt Axton's owned label, which released that song in Axton's album Free Sailin. Mark M. Dawson is not to be confused with the others Mark Dawson who have Wikipedia biographies.)

David Carradine wrote and sang Man.

== Release and reception ==
Cloud Dancer was first released on January 1, 1980, but had its worldwide premiere in Milwaukee on May 29, 1980.

Reviews and critiques of the movie address its weak and formulaic plot, while praising the cinematography and realistic depiction of the aerobatics discipline.

Leonard Maltin in his Movie Guide gave the film two and a half stars of four, and wrote: "Uneven tale of aerobatic-obsessed Carradine and his relationship with O'Neill. Nice–if too many–flying sequences, hokey melodramatics."

The TV Guide review says: "Although Carradine's quietly anti-heroic ways are intriguing, the filmmakers' main interest is in the never-ending aerial sequences, which are indeed beautiful to watch but fail to advance the plot or embellish the emotional tension with meaning."

Andy Webb from The Movie Scene gave the film three of five stars, and wrote: "(...) "Cloud Dancer" has some of the most spectacular flying cinematography that you end up forgiving it many of its inadequacies because when we are in a plane it blows you away."

Aviation historian Stephen Pendo wrote: "Although the film featured a number of the world's best aerobatic pilots, including Charlie Hillard and Tom Poberezny, a substantial budget, numerous flying sequences, and planes that included a P-51 and a Pitts S-1, the picture was so bad that it never went into wide distribution. Here is a classic example of how good stunt flying cannot save an otherwise poor film."

Justin B. "Jack" Cox, editor-in-chief of Sport Aviation magazine, wrote: "Movie-goers will, of course, instantly recognize the plot. You saw it a hundred times in the glory days of the Old Westerns… the aging sheriff with a reputation as a fast gun, fighting to keep his job from a sharp young deputy as he battles both the bad guys and his girl who wants him to turn in his badge and accept the job as foreman at the Bar X. Cloud Dancer has its hero strapping on a Pitts instead of a six gun… should be great stuff for those of us who grew up (and old) with John Wayne."

Cloud Dancer is well regarded among aviators. (Note: In this model aircraft website forum, aficionados qualify the film as "airplane [porn.]")

Pilot and aviation researcher Simon D. Beck wrote: "A muddled script with a weak narrative is made up for by excellent, innovative aerobatic sequences with a good variety of light aircraft types that capture the art of flying better than most films in this genre."

Executive editor of Flying Magazine Berl Bechner wrote: "There is a movie about to be released that has mediocre acting, a disjointed plot and some of the worst dialogue that you might ever find in a movie theater.
See it anyway.
Cloud Dancer contains flying sequences that are among the most dramatic and exciting you'll ever see on film."

This film continues to inspire people to pursue careers in aerobatics, like Michael Goulian and Elias Corey, and is listed by the specialized public among the films that best depict aviation.

== Home media ==
Cloud Dancer was released in VHS tape in 1991 by Starmaker/Anchor Bay, and in Betamax by Prism Entertainment.
