= Proper noun =

Grammatical concept

A proper noun is a noun that identifies a single entity and is used to refer to that entity (Africa; Jupiter; Sarah; Microsoft) as distinguished from a common noun, which is a noun that refers to a class of entities (continent, planet, person, corporation) and may be used when referring to instances of a specific class (a continent, another planet, these persons, our corporation). Some proper nouns occur in plural form (optionally or exclusively), and then they refer to groups of entities considered as unique (the Hendersons, the Everglades, the Azores, the Pleiades). Proper nouns can also occur in secondary applications, for example modifying nouns (the Mozart experience; his Azores adventure), or in the role of common nouns (he's no Pavarotti; a few would-be Napoleons). The detailed definition of the term is problematic and, to an extent, governed by convention.

A distinction is normally made in current linguistics between proper nouns and proper names. By this strict distinction, because the term noun is used for a class of single words (tree, beauty), only single-word proper names are proper nouns: Peter and Africa are both proper names and proper nouns; but Peter the Great and South Africa, while they are proper names, are not proper nouns. The term common name is not much used to contrast with proper name, but some linguists have used it for that purpose. While proper names are sometimes called simply names, this term is often used more broadly: "An earlier name for tungsten was wolfram." Words derived from proper names are occasionally called proper adjectives (or proper adverbs, and so on), but not in mainstream linguistic theory. Not every noun phrase that refers to a unique entity is a proper name. For example, chastity is a common noun even though chastity is considered a unique abstract entity (constrasted with the personal name Chastity, which is a proper name).

Few proper names have only one possible referent: there are many places named New Haven; Jupiter may refer to a planet, a god, a ship, a city in Florida, or as part of the name of a symphony ("the Jupiter Symphony"); at least one person has been named Mata Hari, as well as a racehorse, several songs, several films, and other objects; there are towns and people named Toyota, as well as the company. In English, proper names in their primary application cannot normally be modified by articles or another determiner, although some may be taken to include the article the, as in the Netherlands, the Roaring Forties, or the Rolling Stones. A proper name may appear to have a descriptive meaning, even though it does not (the Rolling Stones are not stones and do not roll; a woman named Rose is not a flower). If it once had a descriptive meaning, it may no longer be descriptive; a location previously referred to as "the new town" may now have the proper name Newtown though it is no longer new and is now a city rather than a town.

In English and many other languages, proper names and words derived from them are associated with capitalization, but the details are complex and vary from language to language (French lundi, Canada, un homme canadien, un Canadien; English Monday, Canada, a Canadian man, a Canadian; Italian lunedì, Canada, un uomo canadese, un canadese). The study of proper names is sometimes called onomastics or onomatology, while a rigorous analysis of the semantics of proper names is a matter for philosophy of language.

Occasionally, what would otherwise be regarded as a proper noun is used as a common noun, in which case a plural form and a determiner are possible. Examples are in cases of ellipsis (the three Kennedys = the three members of the Kennedy family) and metaphor (the new Gandhi, likening a person to Mahatma Gandhi).

== Proper names ==
Current linguistics makes a distinction between proper nouns and proper names (Note: The distinction is recognized in the Oxford English Dictionary entry "proper, adj., n., and adv." The relevant lemmas within the entry: "proper noun n. Grammar a noun that designates an individual person, place, organization, animal, ship, etc., and is usually written with an initial capital letter; cf. proper name n. ..."; "proper name n. ... a name, consisting of a proper noun or noun phrase including a proper noun, that designates an individual person, place, organization, tame animal, ship, etc., and is usually written with an initial capital letter. ...". See also the Oxford Modern English Grammar and The Cambridge Grammar of the English Language. In a section of The Cambridge Grammar of the English Language headed "The distinction between proper names and proper nouns", Huddleston and Pullum write: "In their primary use proper names normally refer to the particular entities that they name: in this use they have the syntactic status of NPs. ...Proper nouns, by contrast, are word-level units belonging to the category noun. ... Proper nouns are nouns which are specialised to the function of heading proper names.") but this distinction is not universally observed and sometimes it is observed but not rigorously. (Note: The author distinguishes the two terms (including in separate index entries), but elsewhere in the text he conflates them. This conflation runs counter to the accepted definition of noun as denoting a class of single words, as opposed to phrases as higher-level elements of clauses and sentences—a definition that he himself gives (on p. 627, for example).) When the distinction is made, proper nouns are limited to single words only (possibly with the), while proper names include all proper nouns (in their primary applications) as well as noun phrases such as the United Kingdom, North Carolina, Royal Air Force, and the White House. (Note: The authors give as an example the proper name New Zealand, which includes the proper noun Zealand as its head.) Proper names can have a common noun or a proper noun as their head; the United Kingdom is a proper name with the common noun kingdom as its head, and North Carolina is headed by the proper noun Carolina. Especially as titles of works, but also as nicknames and the like, some proper names contain no noun and are not formed as noun phrases (the 1979 film Being There; Hi De Ho as a nickname for Cab Calloway and as the title of a 1947 film about him).

Proper names are also referred to (by linguists) as naming expressions. Sometimes they are called simply names; but that term is also used more broadly (as in "chair is the name for something we sit on"); common name is sometimes used, to make a distinction from proper name.

Common nouns (like agency, boulevard, city, day, edition) are frequently used as components of proper names. In such cases the common noun may determine the kind of entity, and a modifier determines the unique entity itself:

- The 16th robotic probe to land on the planet was assigned to study the north pole, and the 17th probe the south pole.

(common-noun senses throughout)

- When Probe 17 overflew the South Pole, it passed directly over the place where Captain Scott's expedition ended.

(in this sentence, Probe 17 is the proper name of a vessel, and South Pole is a proper name referring to Earth's south pole)

- Sanjay lives on the beach road.

(the road that runs along the beach)

- Sanjay lives on Beach Road.

(as a proper name, Beach Road may have nothing to do with the beach; it may be any distance from the waterfront)

- My university has a school of medicine.

(no indication of the name of the university or its medical school)

- The John A. Burns School of Medicine is located at the University of Hawaii at Manoa.

Proper nouns, and all proper names, differ from common nouns grammatically in English. They may take titles, such as Mr Harris or Senator Harris. Otherwise, they normally only take modifiers that add emotive coloring, such as old Mrs Fletcher, poor Charles, or historic York; in a formal style, this may include the, as in the inimitable Henry Higgins. They may also take the in the manner of common nouns in order to establish the context in which they are unique: the young Mr Hamilton (not the old one), the Dr Brown I know; or as proper nouns to define an aspect of the referent: the young Einstein (Einstein when he was young). The indefinite article a may similarly be used to establish a new referent: the column was written by a [or one] Mary Price. Proper names based on noun phrases differ grammatically from common noun phrases. They are fixed expressions, and cannot be modified internally: beautiful King's College is acceptable, but not King's famous College.

As with proper nouns, so with proper names more generally: they may only be unique within the appropriate context. India has a ministry of home affairs (a common-noun phrase) called the Ministry of Home Affairs (its proper name); within the context of India, this identifies a unique organization. However, other countries may also have ministries of home affairs called "the Ministry of Home Affairs", but each refers to a unique object, so each is a proper name. Similarly, "Beach Road" is a unique road, though other towns may have their own roads named "Beach Road" as well. This is simply a matter of the pragmatics of naming, and of whether a naming convention provides identifiers that are unique; and this depends on the scope given by context.

=== Proper names and the definite article ===
Because they are used to refer to an individual entity, proper names are by their very nature definite; so many regard a definite article as redundant, and personal names (like John) are used without an article or other determiner. However, some proper names are normally used with the definite article. Grammarians divide over whether the definite article becomes part of the proper name in these cases, or precedes the proper name. The Cambridge Grammar of the English Language terms these weak proper names, in contrast with the more typical strong proper names, which are normally used without an article.

Entities with proper names that use the definite article include geographical features (the Mediterranean, the Thames), buildings (the Parthenon), institutions (the House of Commons), cities and districts (The Hague, the Bronx), works of literature (the Bible), newspapers and magazines (The Times, The Economist, the New Statesman), and events (the '45, the Holocaust). In standard use, plural proper names take the definite article (the Himalayas, the Hebrides). Among the few exceptions are the names of certain bands (Heavy Metal Kids, L.A. Guns, Manic Street Preachers).

However, if adjectives are used, they are placed after the definite article ("the mighty Yangtze"). When such proper nouns are grouped together, sometimes only a single definite article will be used at the head ("the Nile, Congo, and Niger"). And in certain contexts, it is grammatically permissible or even mandatory to drop the article.

The definite article is not used in the presence of preceding possessives ("Da Vinci's Mona Lisa", "our United Kingdom"), demonstratives ("life in these United States", "that spectacular Alhambra"), interrogatives ("whose Mediterranean: Rome's or Carthage's?"), or words like "no" or "another" ("that dump is no Taj Mahal", "neo-Nazis want another Holocaust").

An indefinite article phrase voids the use of the definite article ("a restored Sistine Chapel", "a Philippines free from colonial masters").

The definite article is omitted when such a proper noun is used attributively ("Hague residents are concerned ...", "... eight pints of Thames water ..."). If a definite article is present, it is for the noun, not the attributive ("the Amazon jungle", "the Bay of Pigs debacle").

Nouns of address with a proper name also have the article dropped ("jump that shark, Fonz!", "O Pacific Ocean, be pacific for us as we sail on you", "Go, Bears!", "U-S-A! U-S-A!").

Only a single definite article is used where the construction might seem to require two ("the '~~The~~ Matterhorn' at Disneyland is not the actual mountain of that name"). In a grouping, a single definite article at the start may be understood to cover for the others ("the Germany of Hitler, British Empire of Churchill, United States of Roosevelt, and Soviet Union of Stalin").

Headlines, which often simplify grammar for space or punchiness, frequently omit both definite and indefinite articles.

Definite articles used in the title of a map might be omitted in labels within the map itself (Maldives, Sahara, Arctic Ocean, Andes, Elbe; though typically The Wash, The Gambia). It is also customary to drop the definite article in tables (of nations or territories with population, area, and economy, or of rivers by length).

=== Variants ===
Proper names often have a number of variants, for instance a formal variant (David, the United States of America) and an informal variant (Dave, the United States).

== Capitalization ==
In languages that use alphabetic scripts and that distinguish lower and upper case, there is usually an association between proper names and capitalization. In German, all nouns are capitalized, but other words are also capitalized in proper names (not including composition titles), for instance: der Große Bär (the Great Bear, Ursa Major). For proper names, as for several other kinds of words and phrases, the details are complex, and vary sharply from language to language. For example, expressions for days of the week and months of the year are capitalized in English, but not in Spanish, French, Swedish, or Finnish, though they might still be considered proper names. Languages differ in whether most elements of multiword proper names are capitalized (American English has House of Representatives, in which lexical words are capitalized) or only the initial element (as in Slovenian Državni zbor, "National Assembly"). In Czech, multiword settlement names are capitalized throughout, but non-settlement names are only capitalized in the initial element, though with many exceptions.

=== History of capitalization ===
European alphabetic scripts only developed a distinction between upper case and lower case in medieval times so in the alphabetic scripts of ancient Greek and Latin proper names were not systematically marked. They are marked with modern capitalization, however, in many modern editions of ancient texts.

In past centuries, orthographic practices in English varied widely. Capitalization was much less standardized than today. Documents from the 18th century show some writers capitalizing all nouns, and others capitalizing certain nouns based on varying ideas of their importance in the discussion. Historical documents from the early United States show some examples of this process: the end (but not the beginning) of the Declaration of Independence (1776) and all of the Constitution (1787) show nearly all nouns capitalized; the Bill of Rights (1789) capitalizes a few common nouns but not most of them; and the Thirteenth Constitutional Amendment (1865) capitalizes only proper nouns.

In Danish, from the 17th century until the orthographic reform of 1948, all nouns were capitalized.

=== Modern English capitalization of proper nouns ===
In modern English orthography, it is the norm for recognized proper names to be capitalized. The few clear exceptions include summer and winter (contrast July and Christmas). It is also standard that most capitalizing of common nouns is considered incorrect, except when the capitalization is simply a matter of text styling, as at the start of a sentence or in titles and other headings. See Letter case § Title case.

Although these rules have been standardized, there are enough gray areas that it can often be unclear both whether an item qualifies as a proper name and whether it should be capitalized: "the Cuban missile crisis" is often capitalized ("Cuban Missile Crisis") and often not, regardless of its syntactic status or its function in discourse. Most style guides give decisive recommendations on capitalization, but not all of them go into detail on how to decide in these gray areas if words are proper nouns or not and should be capitalized or not. (Note: Such guides include AMA Manual of Style and Associated Press Stylebook. The major US guide is The Chicago Manual of Style; the major British one is New Hart's Rules. According to both of these, proper names are generally capitalized, but some apparent exceptions are made, and many nouns and noun phrases that are not presented as proper names include capitalization. For example, Scientific Style and Format: The CSE Manual for Authors, Editors, and Publishers (8th edition, 2014) does not appeal to proper names in discussion of trademarks ("Aspirin", for applicable countries; 9.7.7) or biological taxa ("The Liliaceae are very diverse"; 22.3.1.4), except to mention that component proper nouns are capitalized normally ("Capitalize other parts of a virus name only if they are proper nouns: ... Sandfly fever Naples virus"; 22.3.5.2). The guides vary in their recommendations. Valentine et al. (1996) cite dictionaries and grammars in an effort to settle the scope of the term proper name, but decide (against the majority) not to include expressions for days of the week or months of the year. They cite as evidence the fact that French does not capitalize these.)

Words or phrases that are neither proper nouns nor derived from proper nouns are often capitalized in present-day English: Dr, Baptist, Congregationalism, His and He in reference to the Abrahamic deity (God). For some such words, capitalization is optional or dependent on context: northerner or Northerner; aboriginal trees but Aboriginal land rights in Australia. When the comes at the start of a proper name, as in the White House, it is not normally capitalized unless it is a formal part of a title (of a book, film, or other artistic creation, as in The Keys to the Kingdom).

Nouns and noun phrases that are not proper may be uniformly capitalized to indicate that they are definitive and regimented in their application (compare brand names, discussed below). Mountain Bluebird does not identify a unique individual, and it is not a proper name but a so-called common name (somewhat misleadingly, because this is not intended as a contrast with the term proper name). Such capitalization indicates that the term is a conventional designation for exactly that species (Sialia currucoides), not for just any bluebird that happens to live in the mountains. (Note: "This list [... a check-list, from the American Ornithologists' Union] makes sure that each capitalized common name corresponds to one and only one scientific name and each scientific name corresponds to one and only capitalized common name.")

Words or phrases derived from proper names are generally capitalized, even when they are not themselves proper names. Londoner is capitalized because it derives from the proper name London, but it is not itself a proper name (it can be limited: the Londoner, some Londoners). Similarly, African, Africanize, and Africanism are not proper names, but are capitalized because Africa is a proper name. Adjectives, verbs, adverbs, and derived common nouns that are capitalized (Swiss in Swiss cheese; Anglicize; Calvinistically; Petrarchism) are sometimes loosely called proper adjectives (and so on), but not in mainstream linguistics. Which of these items are capitalized may be merely conventional. Abrahamic, Buddhist, Hollywoodize, Freudianism, and Reagonomics are capitalized; quixotic, bowdlerize, mesmerism, and pasteurization are not; aeolian and alpinism may be capitalized or not.

Some words or some homonyms (depending on how a body of study defines "word") have one meaning when capitalized and another when not. Sometimes the capitalized variant is a proper noun (the Moon; dedicated to God; Smith's apprentice) and the other variant is not (the third moon of Saturn; a Greek god; the smith's apprentice). Sometimes neither is a proper noun (a swede in the soup; a Swede who came to see me). Such words that vary according to case are sometimes called capitonyms (although only rarely: this term is scarcely used in linguistic theory and does not appear in the Oxford English Dictionary).

=== Brand names ===
In most alphabetic languages, proprietary terms that are nouns or noun phrases are capitalized whether or not they count as proper names. Not all brand names are proper names, and not all proper names are brand names.

- Microsoft is a proper name, referring to a specific company. But if Microsoft is given a non-standard secondary application, in the role of a common noun, these usages are accepted: "The Microsofts of this world"; "That's not the Microsoft I know!"; "The company aspired to be another Microsoft."
- Chevrolet is similarly a proper name referring to a specific company. But unlike Microsoft, it is also used in the role of a common noun to refer to products of the named company: "He drove a Chevrolet" (a particular vehicle); "The Chevrolets of the 1960s" (classes of vehicles). In these uses, Chevrolet does not function as a proper name.
- Corvette (referring to a car produced by the company Chevrolet) is not a proper name: (Note: The authors use Cortina (manufactured by the company Ford) as an example of a "tradename but not a proper name".) it can be pluralized (French and English Corvettes); and it can take a definite article or other determiner or modifier: "the Corvette", "la Corvette"; "my Corvette", "ma Corvette"; "another new Corvette", "une autre nouvelle Corvette". Similarly, Chevrolet Corvette is not a proper name: "We owned three Chevrolet Corvettes." It contrasts with the uncapitalized corvette, a kind of warship.

== Alternative marking of proper names ==
In non-alphabetic scripts, proper names are sometimes marked by other means.

In Egyptian hieroglyphs, parts of a royal name were enclosed in a cartouche: an oval with a line at one end.

In Chinese script, a proper name mark (a kind of underline) has sometimes been used to indicate a proper name. In the standard Pinyin system of romanization for Mandarin Chinese, capitalization is used to mark proper names, with some complexities because of different Chinese classifications of nominal types, (Note: The authors distinguish proper nouns, common nouns, abstract nouns, material nouns, and collective nouns.) and even different notions of such broad categories as word and phrase.

Sanskrit and other languages written in the Devanagari script, along with many other languages using alphabetic or syllabic scripts, do not distinguish upper and lower case and do not mark proper names systematically.

== Acquisition and cognition ==
There is evidence from brain disorders such as aphasia that proper names and common names are processed differently by the brain.

There also appear to be differences in language acquisition. Although Japanese does not distinguish overtly between common and proper names, two-year-old children learning Japanese distinguished between expressions for categories into which objects fall (common) and expressions referring to individuals (proper). When a previously unknown label was applied to an unfamiliar object, the children assumed that the label designated the class of object, regardless of whether the object was animate or inanimate. But if the object already had an established name, there was a difference between inanimate objects and animals:

- for inanimate objects, the children tended to interpret the new label as a sub-class, but
- for animals they tended to interpret the label as a name for the individual animal (i.e. a proper name).

In English, children employ different strategies depending on the type of referent but also rely on syntactic cues, such as the presence or absence of the determiner "the" to differentiate between common and proper nouns when first learned.

== See also ==
- Name
- Proper name (philosophy)

== Bibliography ==
- Aarts, Bas (2011). Oxford Modern English Grammar. Oxford: Oxford University Press. ISBN 978-0-19-165047-5.
- Iverson, Cheryl, ed. (2007). AMA Manual of Style (10th ed.). Oxford University Press. ISBN 978-0-19-517633-9.
- Anderson, John Mathieson (2007). The Grammar of Names. Oxford University Press. ISBN 978-0-19-929741-2.
- Associated Press Stylebook (42nd ed.). The Associated Press, Basic Books. 2007. ISBN 978-0-465-00489-8.
- Binyong, Yin; Felley, Mary (1990). Chinese Romanization: Pronunciation and Orthography. Beijing: Sinolingua. ISBN 978-7-80052-148-5.
- Chalker, Sylvia (1992). "Proper noun". In McArthur, Tom (ed.). The Oxford Companion to the English Language. Oxford: Oxford University Press. ISBN 978-0-19-214183-5.
- Collier, Mark; Manley, Bill (2003). How to Read Egyptian Hieroglyphs. University of California Press. ISBN 978-0-520-23949-4.
- Dunn, Jon Lloyd; Alderfer, Jonathan K. (2006). National Geographic Field Guide to the Birds of North America. National Geographic Books. ISBN 978-0-7922-5314-3.
- Greenbaum, Sidney (1996). The Oxford English Grammar. Oxford University Press. ISBN 978-0-19-861250-6.
- Huddleston, Rodney; Pullum, Geoffrey (2002). The Cambridge Grammar of the English Language. Cambridge; New York: Cambridge University Press. ISBN 0-521-43146-8.
- Imai, Mutsumi; Haryu, Etsuko (2001). "Learning Proper Nouns and Common Nouns without Clues from Syntax". Child Development. 72 (3). Wiley: 787–802. doi:10.1111/1467-8624.00315. ISSN 0009-3920. PMID 11405582.
- Jespersen, Otto (2013) [First published 1996]. The Philosophy of Grammar. Routledge. ISBN 978-1-135-66575-3.
- Katz, Nancy; Baker, Erica; Macnamara, John (1974). "What's in a name? A study of how children learn common and proper names". Child Development. 45 (2). Wiley: 469–473. doi:10.2307/1127970. ISSN 0009-3920. JSTOR 1127970.
- Leech, Geoffrey (2006). A Glossary of English Grammar. Edinburgh University Press. ISBN 978-0-7486-1729-6.
- Lester, Mark; Beason, Larry (2005). The McGraw-Hill Handbook of English Grammar and Usage. New York: McGraw-Hill. ISBN 0-07-144133-6.
- Neufeldt, Virginia (1991). Webster's new world dictionary of American English. 3rd college edition. New York: Prentice Hall. 013949314X.
- Packard, Jerome L. (2000). The Morphology of Chinese: A Linguistic and Cognitive Approach. Cambridge, UK: Cambridge University Press. ISBN 978-1-139-43166-8.
- Pei, Mario A.; Gaynor, Frank (1954). A dictionary of linguistics. OxfordNew York: Philosophical Library.
- Po-Ching, Yip; Rimmington, Don (2006). Chinese: An Essential Grammar (2nd ed.). Oxford: Taylor & Francis (Routledge). ISBN 978-0-203-96979-3.
- Quinn, Charles (2005). A Nature Guide to the Southwest Tahoe Basin. self-published. ISBN 978-0-9708895-4-6.
- Quirk, Randolph; Greenbaum, Sidney; Leech, Geoffrey; Svartvik, Jan (1985). A Comprehensive Grammar of the English Language. Harlow: Longman. ISBN 978-0-582-51734-9.
- Robsona, Jo; Marshalla, Jane; Pringa, Tim; Montagua, Ann; Chiatb, Shula (2004). "Processing proper nouns in aphasia: Evidence from assessment and therapy". Aphasiology. 18 (10). Taylor & Francis: 917–935. doi:10.1080/02687030444000462. S2CID 144541071.
- Valentine, Tim; Brennen, Tim; Brédart, Serge (2002) [First published 1996]. The Cognitive Psychology of Proper Names: On the Importance of Being Ernest. Oxford: Taylor & Francis. ISBN 978-1-134-77956-7.
- Van Langendonck, Willy, Theory and Typology of Proper Names
- Merriam-Webster's Collegiate Dictionary (1993; 10th ed.). Springfield, Massachusetts: Merriam-Webster. ISBN 978-0-87779-707-4.
- Online Dictionary of Language Terminology [ODTL]. Steeves, Jon (ed.). http://www.odlt.org.
- The American Heritage Dictionary of the English Language (2000; 4th ed.). Boston and New York: Houghton Mifflin. ISBN 978-0-395-82517-4.
