= Mata Hari (disambiguation) =

Mata Hari (1876–1917) was a Dutch exotic dancer executed for espionage during World War I.

Mata Hari or Matahari may also refer to:

== Film and television ==
- Mata Hari (1927 film), a German film starring Magda Sonja
- Mata Hari (1931 film), starring Greta Garbo in the title role
- Mata Hari (1985 film), produced by Golan-Globus
- Mata Hari (unfinished film), a project begun in the 1970s by David Carradine
- Mata Hari, Agent H21, a 1964 French-Italian spy film
- Mata Hari (TV series), a 2017 program jointly produced by Ukrainian Star Media company and Channel One Russia

== Music and musicals ==
- Mata Hari (1967 musical), a 1967 musical by Jerome Coopersmith, Martin Charnin and Edward Thomas
- Mata Hari (Wildhorn musical), a 2016 musical by Frank Wildhorn, Jack Murphy and Ivan Mechell
- "Mata Hari" (Ofra Haza song), 1995 song by Israeli singer Ofra Haza
- "Mata Hari" (Anne-Karine Strøm song), the Norwegian entry in the Eurovision Song Contest 1976
- "Mata Hari" (Samira Efendi song), the Azerbaijani entry in the Eurovision Song Contest 2021

== Businesses ==
- Matahari Books, a Malaysian publishing company
- Matahari (department store), a major department store chain in Indonesia

== Other uses ==
- Mata Hari (horse), an American Thoroughbred racehorse
- Mata Hari (pinball), a 1977 pinball machine
- Mata Hari (video game), a 2008 adventure game for Windows
