= Art Scholl =

American acrobatic pilot, aerial cameraman, flight instructor and educator

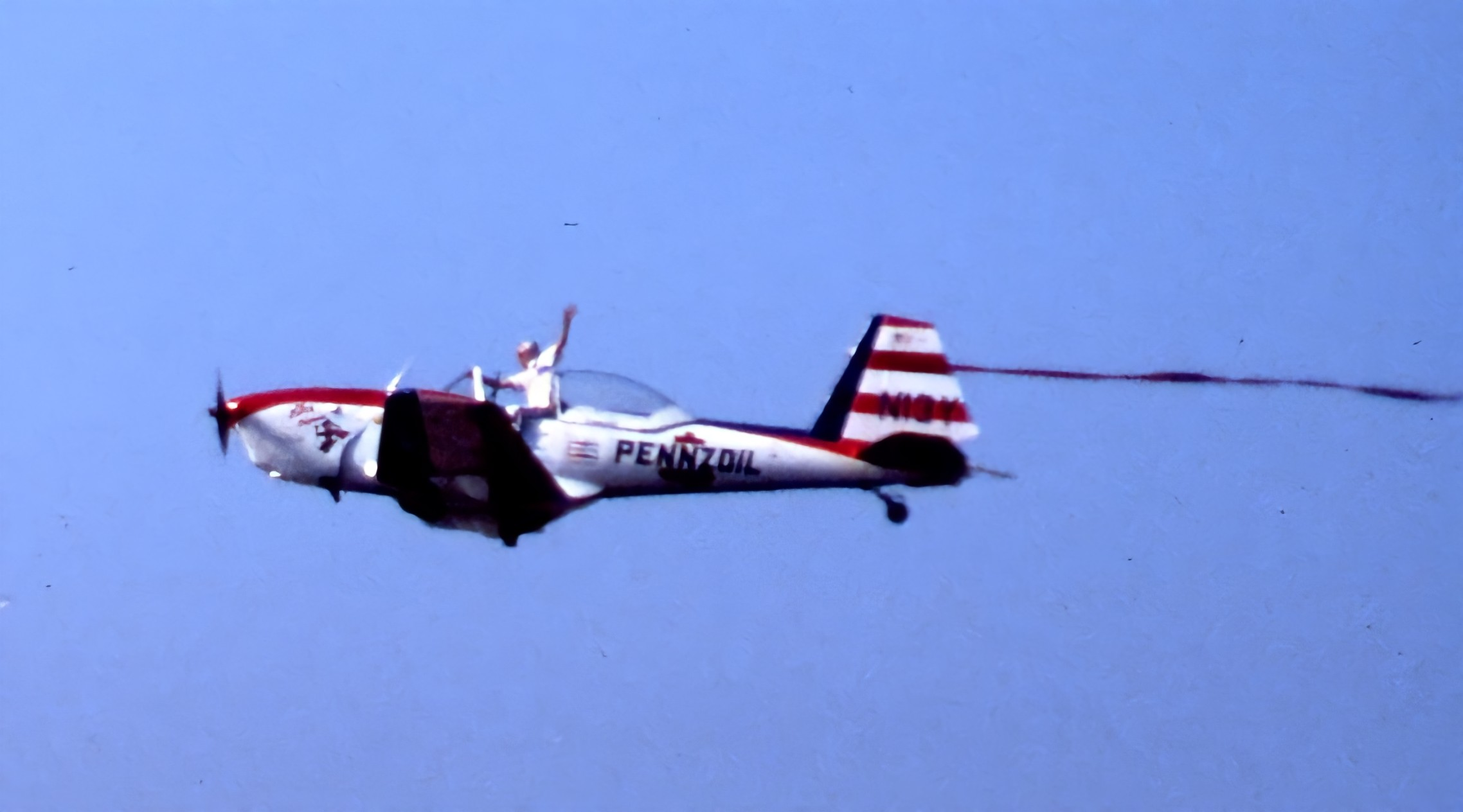
- Art Scholl in his Super Chipmunk N13Y at a 1984 California airshow
- Born: Arthur Everett Scholl; December 24, 1931; Milwaukee, Wisconsin, U.S.
- Died: September 16, 1985 (aged 53); Pacific Ocean
- Cause of death: Plane crash (failed to recover from an intentional spin)
- Resting place: Pacific Ocean
- Other name: Art Scholl
- Occupation: Commercial aerobatic pilot
- Years active: 1950–1985
- Known for: Aerobatics, stunt flying and air displays
- Spouse: Judy Scholl
- Children: 2

Arthur Everett Scholl (December 24, 1931 – September 16, 1985) was an American aerobatic pilot, aerial cameraman, flight instructor and educator based in Riverside, Southern California. He died during the filming of Top Gun when his Pitts S-2 camera plane failed to recover from a spin and plunged into the Pacific Ocean.

== Work ==
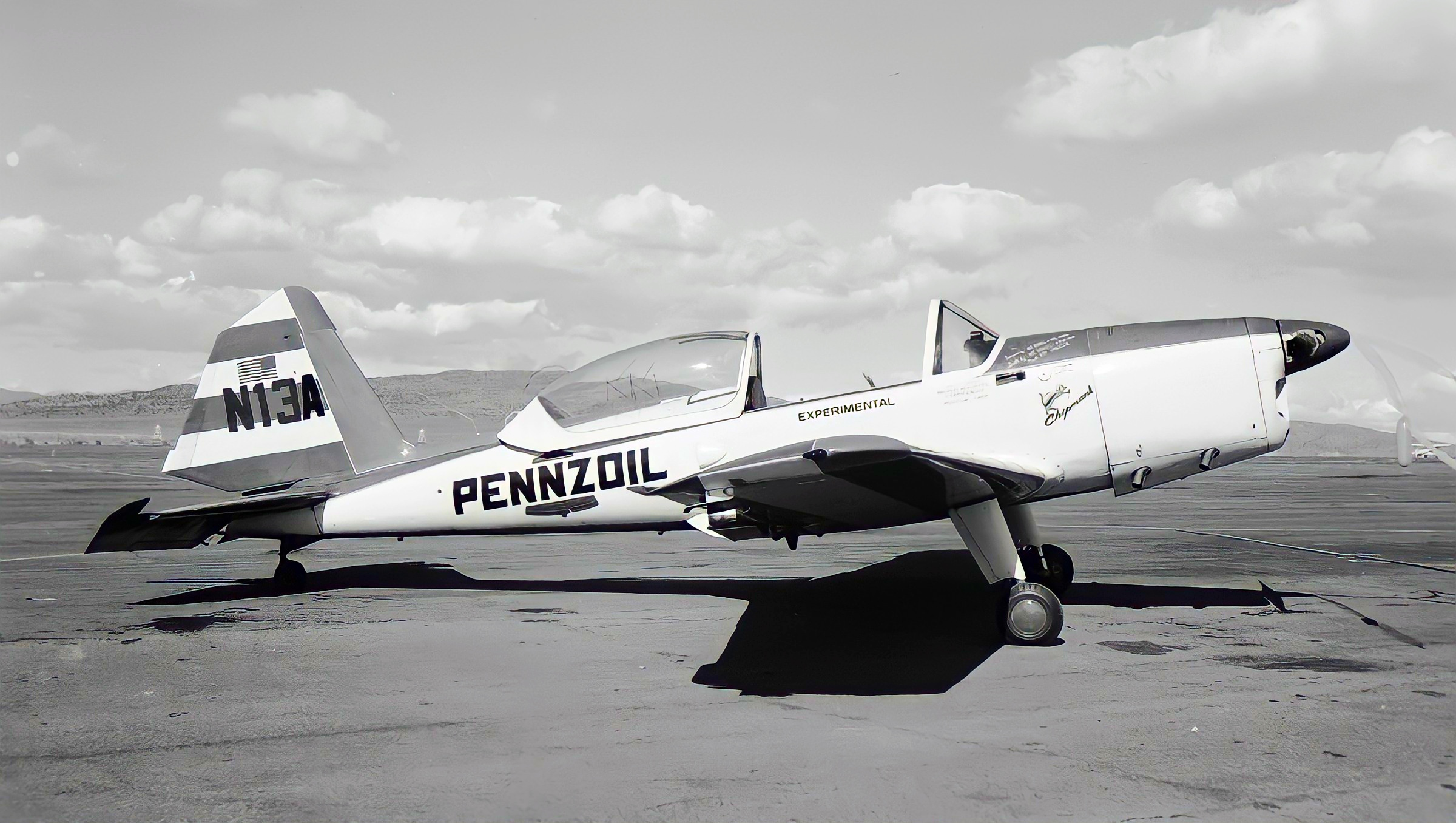
Art Scholl's Super Chipmunk aircraft at the Reno Air Races 1968.

Scholl came to California from Milwaukee as a young man, entered Mt. San Antonio College and eventually California State University, San Jose, where he earned a degree in aeronautics. After receiving a master's degree at California State University, Los Angeles, he taught aeronautics in San Bernardino.

After 18 years, he decided he was stagnating and quit to become a full-time stunt pilot.

Scholl performed across the United States and internationally from the late 1950s to the mid-1980s. In the mid-1960s he was a professor and head of the Department of Aeronautics at San Bernardino Valley College and an experienced pilot of midget air racers. He flew a pair of modified de Havilland Canada DHC-1 Chipmunk aircraft, renamed "Super Chipmunks" (FAA registration numbers N13A, N13Y) (Note: Art Scholl's Super Chipmunk N13A was sold in April 1972 to J. Reid Garrison, FBO operator at the Oconee Airport in Clemson, South Carolina, and moved to the Anderson Municipal Airport in Anderson, South Carolina, when Garrison relocated his business there in the 1980s. Super Chipmunk N13Y went to the National Air and Space Museum in Washington, D.C., in 1987.) and occasionally a third aircraft N1804Q, before an estimated audience of 80 million people over 20 years and appeared in more than 200 motion picture features, documentaries and television commercials. The aircraft were recognizable for their red, white and blue livery and Pennzoil corporate sponsorship.

Scholl held four FAA certificates. He was an Airline Transport Pilot in multi-engine land and sea planes, with commercial privileges in airplane single engine land and airplane single engine sea, helicopters, and gliders. He held certificates as both a flight instructor and ground instructor. In addition, he was also a certificated airframe and power plant mechanic with an inspection authorization. In 1976 Scholl earned a Ph.D. in Aviation Management. He taught aeronautics at San Bernardino Valley College for 18 years, eventually becoming head of the department.

Scholl founded an aerobatics school and maintenance facility at Flabob Airport in Riverside, California. He converted it to a full-service fixed-base operation (FBO) when he moved it to Rialto Municipal Airport, then known as Miro Field, in Rialto, California in 1978. (Note: David Carradine names Art Scholl as one of his instructors in his preparation for his role as an aerobatic pilot in Cloud Dancer (1980).) He produced several highly successful air shows at Miro Field, attracting hundreds of thousands of spectators. Miro Field had once been renamed Art Scholl Memorial Field in his memory. Scholl's company, Art Scholl Aviation, relocated back to Flabob Airport shortly before the airport at Rialto closed in 2014.

Scholl's signature aircraft were his two Super Chipmunks; he bought his first one in 1963 and his second one in 1968. His skill as a licensed aircraft mechanic helped Scholl in modifying the aircraft extensively; clipping its wings, adding retractable landing gear, converting them to single-seat, adding an autopilot and a much bigger engine. At the height of his popularity as an air show performer in the 1970s, Scholl flew two Super Chipmunks, basing one on the East Coast and one on the West Coast. His Super Chipmunk was licensed to various model manufacturers for both flying and static models; collectors now actively seek the Cox control line model. Although less widely recognized, Scholl also owned and flew a Pitts S-2A in the same red, white, and blue livery. Another Art Scholl signature was his dog, "Aileron", who occasionally flew in the Super Chipmunk's cockpit with Scholl in his air show performances. Aileron was hugely popular with the crowds.

Scholl's aerial camera work appeared in many commercials, television shows and films, including The Right Stuff, The Great Waldo Pepper, Blue Thunder, Vega$, The A-Team, CHiPs, Iron Eagle, and Top Gun, his final work in a motion picture. Top Gun in its last line of credit states "This film is dedicated to the memory of Art Scholl."

Scholl was a member of the five-person aerobatic team representing the United States in international competition from 1963 through 1972. He flew competition at Moscow in 1966; Magdeburg, East Germany, 1968; Hullavington, England, 1970, and Salon de Provence, France. In 1974, he won the U.S. National Aerobatic Championship in a Pitts S-2A.

== Personal life ==
Scholl's wife, Judy, helped run his business and manage his performances.

Bob Hoover, the World War II fighter pilot, former test pilot and fellow aerobatic pilot, was a close friend of Scholl. Hoover was often at Scholl's Rialto facility, where he also maintained a hangar for his aircraft.

Scholl died during the filming of Top Gun when his Pitts S-2 camera plane failed to recover from a spin and plunged into the Pacific Ocean. He had entered the spin intentionally in order to capture it on film using on-board cameras. Observers watched the plane continue to spin as it descended past the planned recovery altitude. Scholl's last words over the radio were "I have a problem‚ I have a real problem,” after which the plane impacted the ocean about 5 miles (8.0 km) off the coast, near Carlsbad, California. The exact cause of the crash was never determined. Neither the aircraft nor Scholl's body were ever recovered.

== Filmography ==
| Year | Title | Role | Notes |
|---|---|---|---|
| 1973 | Jonathan Livingston Seagull | Pilot; aerobatic aircraft | |
| 1973 | Never Look Back | UCLA aeronautics professor | |
| 1975 | The Great Waldo Pepper | Red Baron | Uncredited; Also stunts |
| 1976 | To Fly! | Stunt Pilot | IMAX film |
| 1980 | Where the Buffalo Roam | Light Plane Pilot #1 | |
| 1980 | Herbie Goes Bananas | Stunt player | |
| 1981 | CHiPs | Bomb Run S5 E1 | |
| 1982 | Flyers | Stunt Pilot | IMAX film |
| 1983 | The Right Stuff | Stunt Pilot | |
| 1983 | To Be or Not to Be | Stunt Pilot | |
| 1984 | Flashpoint | Stunt Pilot | |
| 1984 | Impulse | Pilot | |
| 1985 | Prime Risk | Flight Instructor | |
| 1985 | Explorers | Stunt Pilot | |
| 1985 | The Man with One Red Shoe | Helicopter Pilot | |
| 1986 | Top Gun | Stunt Pilot | Uncredited * film dedicated to him |
| 1986 | Iron Eagle | Special aerial stunts | Final film |

== See also ==
- List of people who disappeared mysteriously at sea
