= Stuart Mossman =

- Born: Stuart L. Mossman; May 13, 1942; Hinsdale, Illinois
- Died: March 2, 1999 (aged 56) Winfield, Kansas
- Occupations: Guitar Makers, singer-songwriter, entrepreneur
- Years active: 1968–1984 Business = S. L. Mossman Guitars

Stuart Mossman (May 13, 1942 – March 2, 1999) was an American guitar maker, entertainer and entrepreneur who built 6,000 guitars from 1968 to 1984 that were played by several professional guitarists, including John Denver, Eric Clapton, Albert Lee, Doc Watson, Hank Snow, Cat Stevens and Merle Travis. Mossman's work is seen as the foundation for today's generations of Luthiers who build guitars from fine tone woods.

== Background ==
Mossman was born in Hinsdale, Illinois, on May 13, 1942. He began making nylon-string guitars in 1961 and spent several years designing 40 to 50 prototypes in his garage in Winfield, Kansas. Mossman took his first steel-string flat top to legendary acoustic singer-songwriter Doc Watson and asked for his "brutal" opinion. Watson gave it to him, and Mossman took his advice and applied it to his next design. He took another guitar to Watson at the 1969 Philadelphia Folk Festival, where, this time, the guitarist used it on stage, and reportedly told Mossman it was the "second best guitar he'd ever played." In 1970 Mossman moved his operations to Strother Field just outside Winfield and it was there that he established S.L. Mossman Guitars. Using old-world building techniques, top-quality woods, and a proprietary bracing structure, Mossman guitars entered series production in the early 1970s.

== S.L. Mossman Guitars ==
Mossman felt that the boom in folk music during the 1960s/70s pushed a popular demand for acoustic instruments. While Gibson, Martin and Guild were increasing production, imports from the Pacific rim countries were beginning to exploit the lower end of the market. He had a strong disdain towards the use of plywood and insisted on solid-wood construction for the production of his guitars. In an early catalog for Mossman guitars he stated: "The vile abomination is currently being perpetrated on the unsuspecting guitar-playing public on a grand scale. There are so many of these plywood things on the market at this writing that there is a possibility you may not have even heard a real guitar. We at Mossman considered plywood briefly one day, and unanimously decided that plywood makes the best cement forms available. We do not now, nor will we ever, stoop to the level of plywood construction and we apologize for our contemporaries who have lowered the station of our craft by using laminated backs and sides."

Since the Mossman shop was small enough for Mossman to oversee every model, he was able to offer a variety of custom options for his customers which included an extra-wide neck, 12 strings and custom inlay and engravings. Also, customers were able to order a specific type of voicing for their guitars described in the catalog as "overbalanced bass, overbalanced treble, or balanced bass and treble." One of the unique features on the Mossman guitars are their thin neck arrangements, which were carved by a worker at the factory who played banjo and preferred the feel and playability of "lower-profile necks."

Despite the fact that he lost a lot of business in comparison to competing companies like Martin Guitars, who also used high-quality tone woods and manufactured more than 20 times the number of guitars made in a day by Mossman. Mossman never wanted to produce guitars on a mass scale.

The company gained recognition by 1974 and was producing up to eight to ten guitars a day, each one personally inspected by Mossman himself.

== Guitar models ==
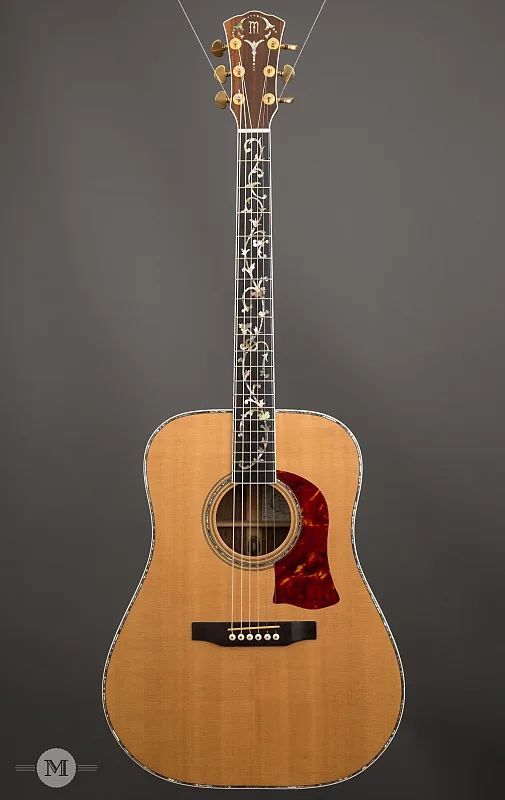
1976 Mossman Golden Era

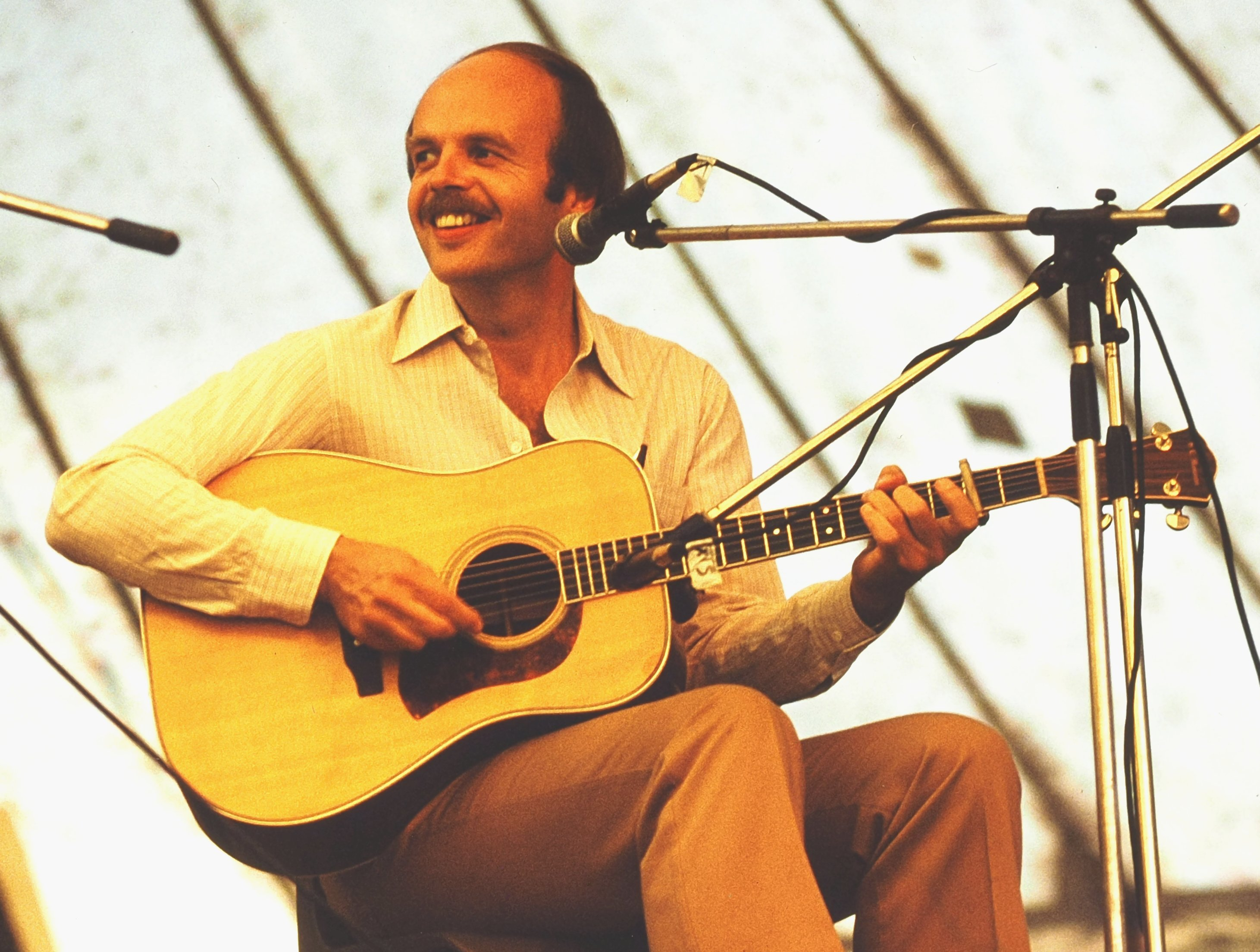
Dan Crary photographed in 1981 with his Mossman Great Plains model guitar

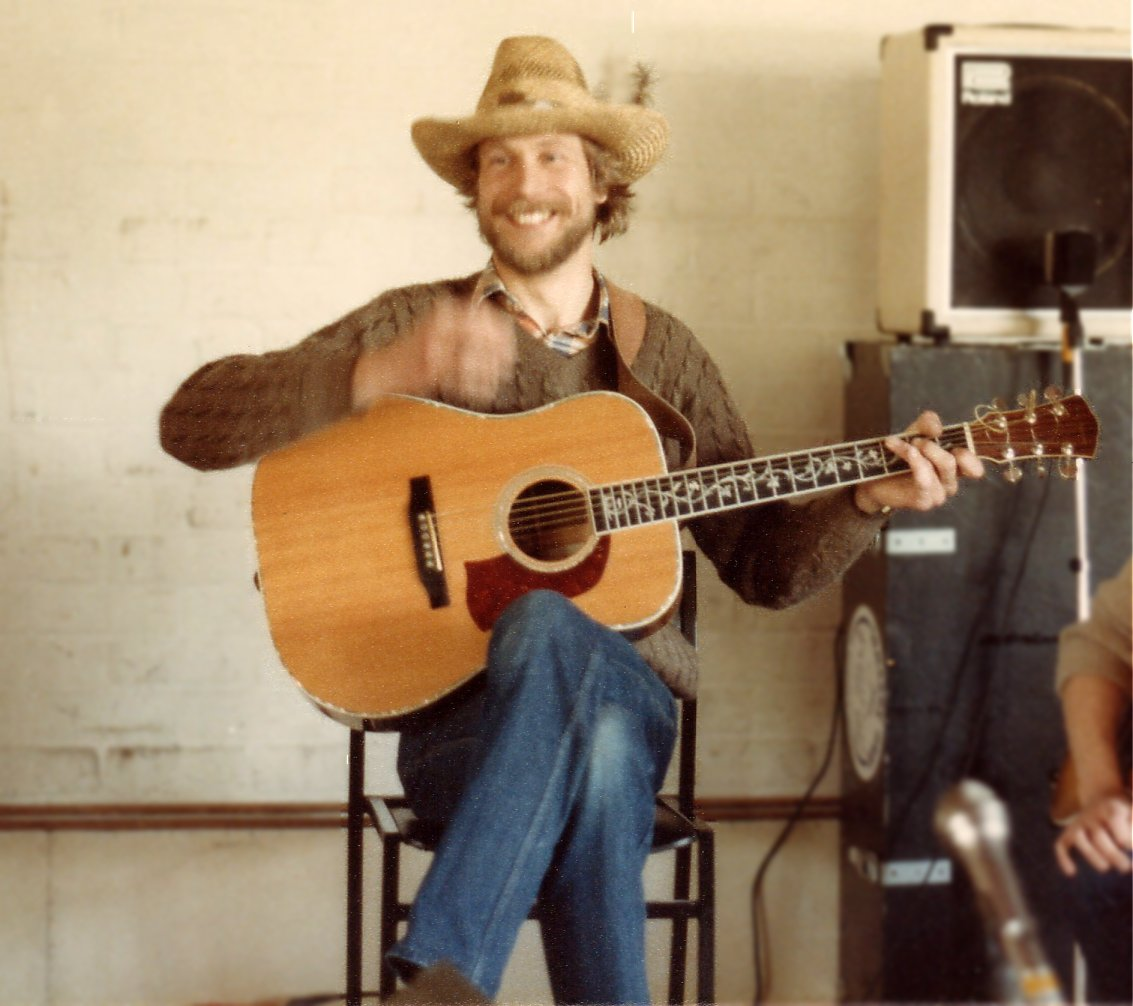
Chris Moreton (U.K. bluegrass guitarist) on stage at Edale Festival, 1984 with his Mossman Golden Era guitar

Tennessee Flat Top Honduras mahogany back and sides, sitka spruce top, mahogany neck, ivoroid binding around box, rosewood fingerboard with mother of pearl dot inlay, rosewood bridge, rosewood peghead overlay, ebony bridge pins with ivoroid dots, herringbone back center marquetry, nickel plated rotomatic tuning pegs, rosewood butt inlay, rosewood heel cap, Ivory nut and saddle.

Flint Hills East Indian rosewood back and sides, sitka spruce top, mahogany neck, ivoroid binding around box, ebony fingerboard with abalone snowflake inlay, ebony bridge pins, ebony bridge pins with mother of pearl dots, rosewood peghead overlay, nickel plated rotomatic tuning pegs, marquis herringbone back center inlay, rosewood butt inlay, rosewood heel cap, ivory nut and saddle.

Great Plains Brazilian rosewood back and sides, select spruce top, mahogany neck, ivoroid binding around box, ebony fingerboard with abalone snowflake inlay, ebony bridge pins, ebony bridge pins with mother of pearl dots, rosewood peghead overlay, Nickel plated rotomatic tuning pegs, marquis herringbone back center inlay, Rosewood butt inlay, rosewood heel cap, ivory nut and saddle.

Golden Era Brazilian rosewood back and sides, German spruce top, ivoroid binding around box, mahogany neck, abalone inlay around top and sound hole, abalone vine inlay on fingerboard, ebony fingerboard, rosewood peghead overlay, ebony bridge, ivory bridge pins with abalone dots, abalone back strip inlay, gold plated rotomatic tuning pegs, ebony butt inlay, ebony heel cap, Ivoroid bound fingerboard, ivoroid bound peghead, ivory nut, ivory saddle, and an intricate abalone vine inlay up the length of the fingerboard.

Golden Era Custom This was Mossman's top line instrument and it featured select Brazilian rosewood back and sides, German spruce top, ivoroid binding around box, walnut neck, abalone inlay around top and sound hole, abalone floral inlay on fingerboard, ebony fingerboard, walnut burl peghead overlay, ebony bridge, ivory bridge pins with abalone dots, abalone back strip inlay, gold plated rotomatic tuning pegs, ebony butt inlay, ebony heel cap, Ivoroid bound fingerboard, Ivoroid bound peghead, Ivory nut and saddle.

SPECIFICATIONS

All Mossman guitars include the following features: light weight spruce struts and braces, adjustable steel truss rod in neck, rotomatic tuning pegs (12:1 ratio), rosewood or ebony wedge butt inlay, ivoroid position dot markers on edge of fingerboard, (ebony dots on models with ivoroid bound fingerboard), nickel-silver frets, satin lacquer finish hand rubbed to a deep gloss, ivoroid binding around box ivory nut and saddle.

== Factory Fire ==
In 1975 a fire erupted in the finishing area, which contained a number of flammable chemicals, resulting in the loss of one of the company's buildings that was used for manufacturing and the assembly line. No injuries or deaths were sustained during the course of the fire, and only a few guitars were incinerated; however, the complete supply of rare Brazilian rosewood was destroyed. Mossman had secured a loan from a government-backed Small Business Administration before the fire, so the money was used to rebuild and expand the production facilities.

== C.G. Conn Company ==
The same year as the factory fire Mossman closed a deal with the C.G. Conn Company and produced 1,200 guitars for distribution. The guitars were stored in a warehouse in Nevada where the finish suffered damage.

The cost of the subsequent dispute over responsibility for the loss of guitars between Mossman and Conn resulted in Mossman dismissing most of his staff. By the late 1970s Mossman guitars had only a few employees producing a modest number of instruments a month. Subsequently, the model line was reduced, resulting in heavy financial losses for the company.

== Health concerns ==
In 1983 Mossman decided to sell the company after suffering from serious respiratory problems. Mossman began to feel that his breathing was being affected by years of inhaling 'sawdust, lacquer fumes and ablaone shell fragments'. Mossman stated:

It is with a great deal of sadness that I must write this letter, for it closes a chapter of nearly 20 years in my guitar making life. Unfortunately, due to carelessness in the early years regarding safety precautions in the finish room (for the first five years, I didn't even wear a mask), I have developed sensitivity to glues and lacquers, and my doctor has recommended that I pursue other interests. I would like to take this opportunity to thank you for your support-not only for my efforts, but on behalf of many other small companies-and to express my sincere appreciation to your readers for electing me 'Best Luthier' once and 'Runner Up' several times. Working for awards is not why one strives for higher achievement, but they are a delightful acknowledgment. I would also like to make special thanks to both Dan Crary and John Denver for their use of our instruments and the personal interest in us-a kindness that cannot be replaced. And last and most important, I would like to thank the owners of Mossman guitars everywhere. Without them, I could never have turned a dream into reality. It is my hope that the collectors' items they own give them years of joy.

One of Mossman's employees, Scott Baxendale, offered to buy the Mossman name, inventory and equipment to continue the production of Mossman guitars. Before turning over the company to Baxendale, however, Mossman designed 25 guitars using the finest wood that had been set aside for years. These "final 25" have become a tale of popular folklore as Mossman dedicated a lifetime of experience and the most selective woods to create the instruments.

After Mossman signed over the rights to his company, Baxendale owned and operated S.L. Mossman guitars until it was sold to John Kinsey and Bob Casey in 1989. The company relocated to Sulphur Springs, Texas, where it continues to manufacture custom-made guitars today. 'We bought the company because of the history and reputation that Mossman had established and because we felt it was a real opportunity," stated Kinsey.

== Death ==
Mossman spent the remaining years after his retirement at his home in Winfield, Kansas, with his wife and two daughters. Mossman frequently volunteered and performed at festivals and elementary schools, influencing younger audiences towards folk and bluegrass music.

Mossman died on March 2, 1999, from cardiac arrest. He was 56 years old.

His work and legacy continue to be recognized today through his guitars, musical contributions and appearances in films.

== Walnut Valley Music Festival ==
Mossman is attributed as one of the founding members of the Walnut Valley Music Festival in Winfield, Kansas. The festival hosts a variety of contests, art and musical performances that celebrates the diversity and art of bluegrass and folk music. Some notable performers who have frequented the festival are Jimmy Driftwood, Art Eskeridge, Glenda Bickell, Mance Lipscomb, Johnny Vandiver & Jo Wright, Harry Weldon, Poor Bill Miller, Doc Watson, Merle Watson, Charles Cloud, Shannon Singers, Very & Ray, Pat and Victoria Garvey and the Revelators.

== Filmography ==
The actors David, Keith and Robert Carradine all owned and adored Mossman guitars and even found Mossman cameo roles in their films such as Cloud Dancer, The Long Riders and the television movie Murder Ordained.

Keith Carradine's Oscar- and Golden Globe-winning song, "I'm Easy", which appeared in the 1975 Robert Altman film, Nashville was performed on his custom-made S.L. Mossman guitar. The same guitar was featured throughout the film as Carradine's character, who is a renowned folk singer, performs with it.

== Stuart Mossman: A Modern Stradivari ==
Stuart Mossman: A Modern Stradivari, directed by Barry Brown, premiered at the 25th Santa Barbara International Film Festival, in February 2010 to a sold-out audience. In attendance at the screening were Mossman's wife, and his daughters who thanked the director and audience for the interests and support for their father. The film also screened at the Tallgrass Film Festival in Wichita in October 2010.

The documentary chronicles Mossman's life through testimonials from Mossman's employees, fans, and friends who recount his work, influence and their time shared with the luthier. One scene in the film showcases the world's largest collective of Mossman guitar players gathered at the Smithsonian Memorial to Mossman, in Winfield, Kansas which commemorates his contribution to the guitar and music industries.

The film features the Carradine brothers, David, Keith and Bobby performing on their custom-built Mossman guitars. They all divulge stories of how they became supporters of Mossman and his art. According to imdb "The story is spoken by those who lived it, directly to the audience with unfiltered emotion-told with purposeful simplicity." Mossman had appeared with David Carradine in Cloud Dancer (1980), which Brown also directed, and with all three of the Carradine brothers mentioned in The Long Riders (1980). The film is also noted as David Carradine's final onscreen performance and the end of the movie attributes to both him and Mossman as Carradine's brother Bobby and his son perform on their Mossman guitars at David Carradine's gravesite.
