= Walnut Valley Festival =

Annual acoustic music festival in Kansas, US

Coordinates: 37°14′15″N 97°00′33″W

Walnut Valley Festival (Winfield)
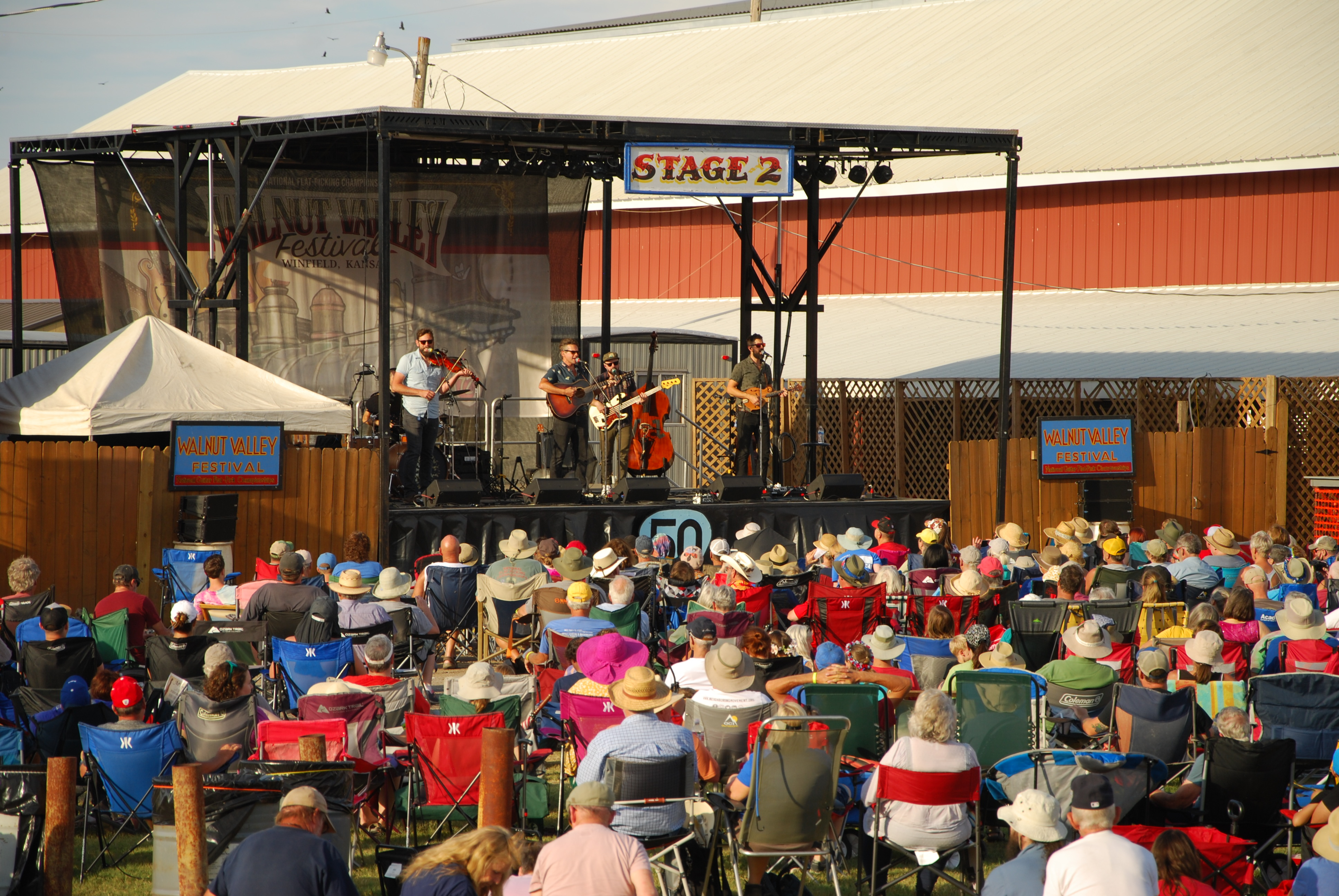
- Stage II at 50th Walnut Valley Festival (2023)
- Genre: Bluegrass music
- Location: Winfield, Kansas
- Years active: 1972-present
- Website: wvfest.com

The Walnut Valley Festival is an acoustic music festival held annually at Winfield, Kansas, United States. The main genre of music is bluegrass, but a wide variety of other acoustic styles are represented. The festival is held on the Wednesday through Sunday which includes the third Saturday of September. It is located at the fairgrounds along the Walnut River and U.S. Route 160 highway in western Winfield.

== History ==
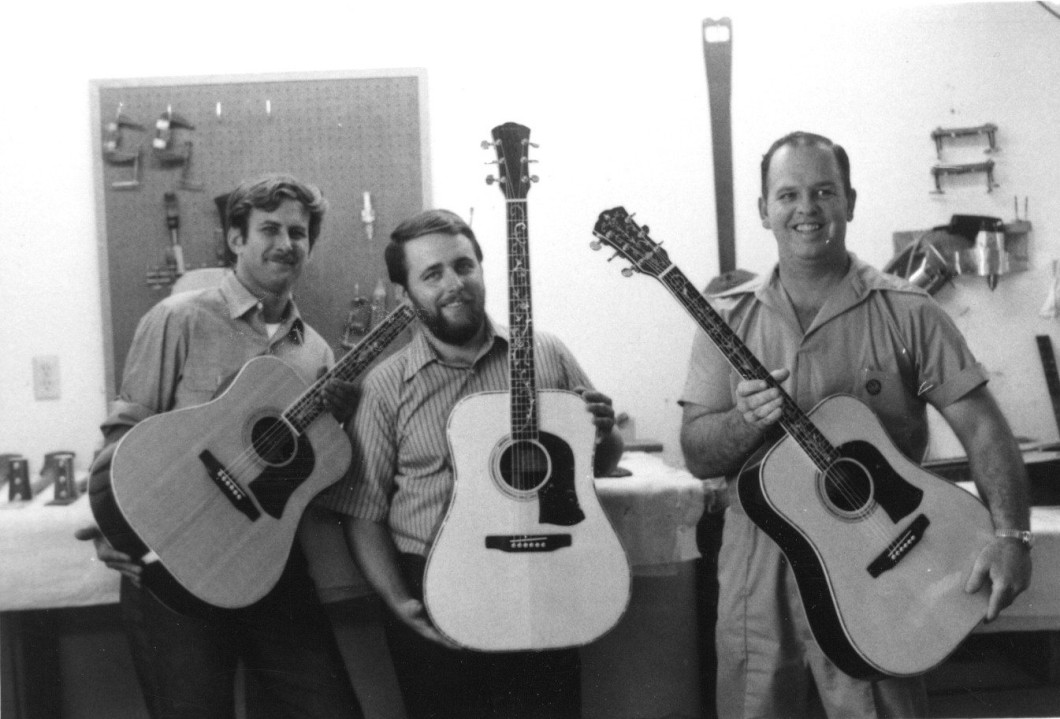
Walnut Valley Festival founders Stuart Mossman, Joe Muret, Bob Redford (left to right)

The first official "Walnut Valley Festival" was held in September 1972 and was organized by a trio of founders--Stuart Mossman, Joe Muret, & Bob Redford. The festival featured a two-day flat-picking contest.

In 1999 the International Bluegrass Music Association named the Walnut Valley Festival as its first "Bluegrass Event of the Year" award winner. The Festival celebrated 50 years in 2022, and that year presented about 200 hours of music on four stages (designated Stages I, II, III and IV) over a long weekend, headlined by nationally- and internationally-known performers.

== Contests ==
The flagship contest is the National Flat-pick Guitar Championship. Other contests include the National Mandolin Championship, the National Bluegrass Banjo Championship, the National Hammer Dulcimer Championship, the National Mountain Dulcimer Championship, the International Autoharp Championship, the International Fingerstyle Guitar Championship, and an Old Time Fiddle contest. The instrument contests routinely see winners from across the US and abroad.

== Camping and jamming ==
There are typically 11,000-15,000 people in attendance, and campers include visitors from many different states and countries. Campsites are not preselected, and campers often line up well in advance of the festival to claim a choice campsite during the "Land Rush".

Attendees often bring musical instruments, and the event is known for the many and varied campground jam sessions throughout the festival. Campground stages operate well into the night, and include Stage 5, Stage 6, Stage 7, Stage 8, Finetime Stage and Stage 11 (songwriters stage). Performers sometimes appear on campground stages or join jams after finishing their sets on the official stages.

Many bands that began as "Jam Bands" in the campgrounds have been invited to perform at the festival, including Driven, Haymakers, Old Sound, Steelwind, Pretend Friend, Walnut River String Band, the Matchsellers, and the Weda Skirts.

== Notable entertainers ==
The list of entertainers who have appeared on WVF stages includes Jimmy Driftwood, Doc Watson, Merle Watson, Lester Flatt, Mark O'Connor, Alison Krauss, Byron Berline, Dan Crary, Norman Blake, John Hartford, Tom Chapin, Merle Travis, Mike Cross, New Grass Revival, Hot Rize, Nickel Creek, Dixie Chicks, Tony Rice, Red Clay Ramblers, Gamble Rogers, Bryan Bowers, John McCutcheon, Tom Paxton, The Steel Wheels, The Wilders, Billy Strings, Bela Fleck, Tim O'Brien, Sierra Hull, David Grisman.

== See also ==
- List of bluegrass music festivals
- List of festivals in the United States
- Kansas State Fair, starts the Friday that follows Labor Day in September, held for 10 days
