= David Carradine =

American actor (1936–2009)

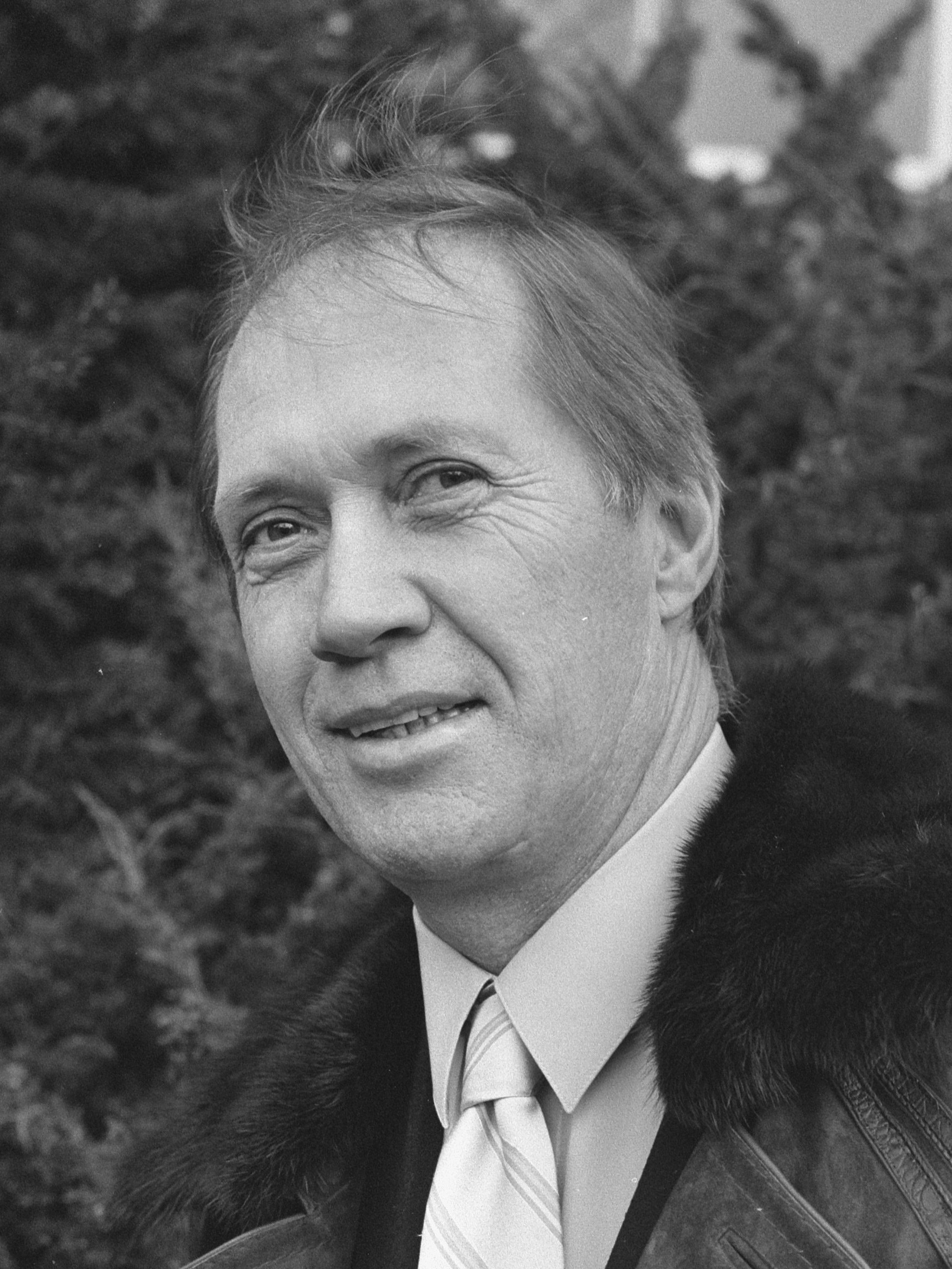
- Carradine in 1987
- Born: John Arthur Carradine Jr. December 8, 1936; Los Angeles, California, U.S.
- Died: June 3, 2009 (aged 72); Bangkok, Thailand
- Resting place: Forest Lawn Memorial Park, Hollywood Hills
- Occupations: Actor; director; producer
- Years active: 1963–2009
- Works: Filmography
- Spouses: Donna Lee Becht (m. 1960; div. 1968); Linda Gilbert (m. 1977; div. 1983); Gail Jensen (m. 1986; div. 1997); Marina Anderson (m. 1998; div. 2001); Annie Bierman (m. 2004)
- Partner: Barbara Hershey (1968–1975)
- Children: 3
- Father: John Carradine
- Relatives: Keith Carradine (half-brother); Robert Carradine (half-brother); Ever Carradine (niece); Martha Plimpton (niece)
- Family: Carradine
- Website: david-carradine.com

John Arthur "David" Carradine Jr. (/ˈkærədiːn/ KARR-ə-deen; December 8, 1936 – June 3, 2009) was an American actor and director, whose career included over 200 major and minor roles in film, television and on stage. He was widely known to television audiences as the star of the series Kung Fu (1972–1975), playing Kwai Chang Caine, a peace-loving Shaolin monk traveling through the American Old West.

A member of the Carradine family of actors, he got his break playing Atahuallpa in the 1965 Broadway production of The Royal Hunt of the Sun. He became known for his B movie and martial arts roles, particularly as Big Bill Shelly in Martin Scorsese's Boxcar Bertha (1972), Frankenstein in Death Race 2000 (1975), the titular character in Cannonball (1976), Kaz Oshay in Deathsport (1978), Detective Shepherd in Q – The Winged Serpent (1982), and Rawley Wilkes in Lone Wolf McQuade (1983). He portrayed Woody Guthrie in the biopic Bound for Glory (1976), which earned him a Golden Globe nomination for Best Actor – Motion Picture Drama. He also received Golden Globe nominations for Kung Fu and for the television miniseries North and South (1985), as well as an Emmy Award nomination, also for Kung Fu.

Carradine experienced a resurgence after playing the title character in Quentin Tarantino's Kill Bill duology (2003–2004). The role of Bill earned him his fourth Golden Globe nomination and he won the Saturn Award for Best Supporting Actor. On April 1, 1997, Carradine received a star on the Hollywood Walk of Fame.

Throughout his life, Carradine was arrested and prosecuted for a variety of offenses, which often involved substance abuse. On June 4, 2009, he was found dead in a hotel room in Bangkok, Thailand, hanging from a rope tied around his neck and genitals. The cause of death was determined to be accidental death by autoerotic asphyxiation. Films that featured Carradine continued to be released after his death.

In addition to his acting career, Carradine was a director and musician. Influenced by his Kung Fu role, he studied martial arts, particularly Shaolin quan. In 2014, Carradine was posthumously inducted into the Martial Arts History Museum Hall of Fame.

== Early life ==
Carradine was born John Arthur Carradine Jr. in Hollywood, California, the eldest child of actor John Carradine and his wife Ardanelle Abigail (née McCool) Carradine. He had four half-brothers including Keith Carradine and Robert Carradine, and was an uncle of Ever Carradine and Martha Plimpton, all of whom are also actors. Primarily of Irish descent, he was a great-grandson of the Methodist evangelical author Beverly Carradine. Called "Jack" by his family, Carradine had a turbulent childhood. His parents divorced and repeatedly remarried; he was born during his mother's second marriage of three, and his father's first of four. At the time of Carradine's parents' marriage, his mother already had a son by her first husband, whom John Carradine adopted. John Carradine had planned to have a large family, but later he discovered his wife had gotten two abortions without his knowledge, and afterward a miscarriage rendered her unable to carry a baby to term.

Against this backdrop of marital discord, Carradine almost died by suicide by hanging at the age of five. He said the incident followed his discovery that he and his elder half-brother had different biological fathers. Carradine added, "My father saved me, and then confiscated my comic book collection and burned it—which was scarcely the point." After three years of marriage, Ardenelle filed for divorce from John, but they remained married for five more years. They divorced in 1944, when Carradine was seven. His father left California to avoid court action in the alimony settlement. After the couple had a series of court battles over child custody and alimony, which at one point landed John in jail, Carradine joined his father in New York City; by this time, his father had remarried. On December 25, 1947, Carradine appeared in a live telecast adaptation of A Christmas Carol, with his father in the role of Ebenezer Scrooge. For the next few years, Carradine spent time in boarding schools, foster homes, and reform school. He also often accompanied his father to summer theater throughout the Northeast. Carradine spent time in Massachusetts, and a winter milking cows on a farm in Vermont.

=== Oakland ===
Eventually, Carradine returned to California, where he graduated from Oakland High School. He attended Oakland Junior College (now Laney College) for a year before transferring to San Francisco State College, where he studied drama and music theory, and wrote music for the drama department's annual revues while juggling menial jobs, a fledgling stage acting career, and his studies. After he dropped out of college, Carradine spent some time with the "beatniks" of San Francisco's North Beach and southern California's Venice. During this time he collected unemployment insurance and sold coupons for baby pictures. He was also prosecuted for disturbing the peace.

=== Army service ===
Despite an attempt to dodge the draft, in 1960, Carradine was inducted into the United States Army, where he drew pictures for training aids. That Christmas he married his high school sweetheart, Donna Lee Becht. While stationed at Fort Eustis, Virginia, he helped establish a theater company that became known as the "entertainment unit". He met fellow inductee Larry Cohen, who later cast him in Q, The Winged Serpent. He also faced court-martial for shoplifting. In 1962, Donna gave birth to their daughter, Calista, who became an actress. Carradine was honorably discharged after two years of active duty.

== Film and television career ==
=== Early television and film appearances ===
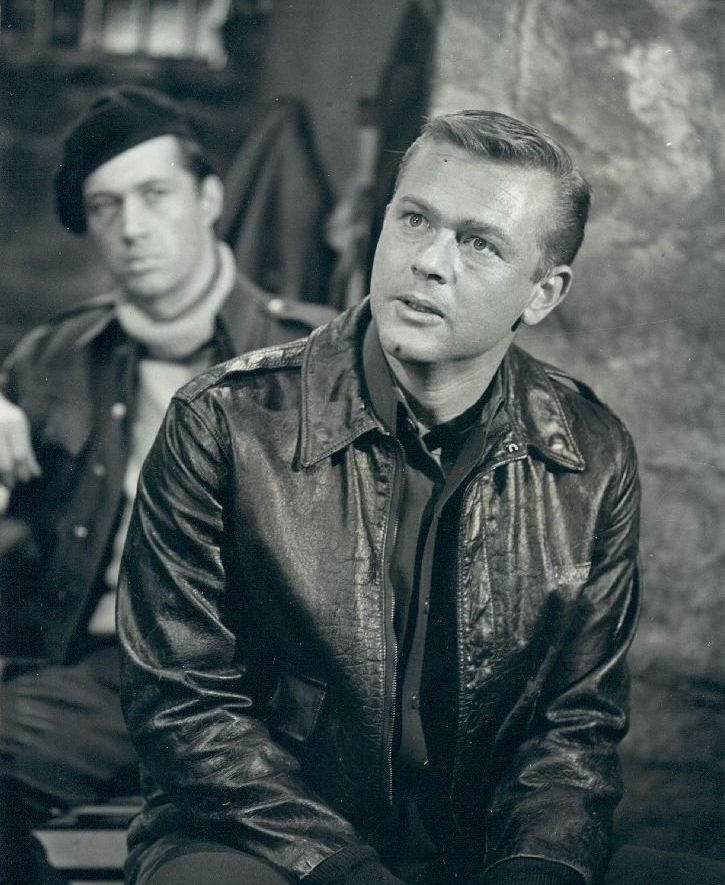
David Carradine (left) and Martin Milner in the Chrysler Theatre presentation "The War and Eric Kurtz" (1965)

Upon leaving the Army, Carradine became serious about acting. He was advised to change his name to avoid confusion with his famous father. In an interview from 2005, Carradine says his father encouraged him going into acting: "The first thing I ever did outside of school, which was a production of Romeo & Juliet, he came up from Hollywood to San Francisco to see it. And right after he just sort of opened up to me with all this advice. He became very proud of me."

In 1963, he made his television debut on an episode of Armstrong Circle Theatre, "Secret Document X256" followed by several other television roles. In 1964 Carradine got a contract with Universal. The studio gave him his feature film debut in Taggart (1964), a Western based on a Louis L'Amour novel.

In May 1964, Carradine joined the cast of the Broadway play The Deputy by Rolf Hochhuth, replacing Jeremy Brett. When the play ended he was still under contract to Universal, and resumed TV work. He spent a lot of time playing, in his words, "greenhorns in Westerns and villains in thrillers". Carradine guest-starred in The Trials of O'Brien in episodes that were cut together and released theatrically as Too Many Thieves (1967), and Coronet Blue.

=== The Royal Hunt of the Sun ===
Carradine's first big break came with his second Broadway part in The Royal Hunt of the Sun, a play by Peter Shaffer about the destruction of the Inca civilization by conquistador Francisco Pizarro. Carradine played Atahuallpa opposite Christopher Plummer as Pizarro. The play premiered in October 1965 and was a solid hit, running for 261 performances. Carradine said of this performance, "Many of the important roles that I got later on were because the guy who was going to hire me was in that audience and had his mind blown." For that part, Carradine won a Theatre World Award for Best Debut Performance in 1965. He was also named as one of Theatre World's Promising Personalities from Broadway and Off Broadway. (The play was filmed in 1968 with Plummer taking Carradine's part.)

=== Shane and supporting actor roles ===
Carradine left the production of Royal Hunt of the Sun in May 1966 to take up an offer to star in the TV series Shane, a 1966 Western based upon a 1949 novel of the same name. Carradine played the title role opposite Jill Ireland. "I know I have some kind of vision that most actors and directors don't have", he said, "so it becomes a duty to exercise that vision. It's a responsibility, a mission." The show only lasted 17 episodes, despite good reviews. Carradine said his career was "rescued" when he was cast in Johnny Belinda (1967). He was in demand as a supporting actor, mostly in Westerns: The Violent Ones (1967), Heaven with a Gun (1969), Young Billy Young (1969) for Burt Kennedy, The Good Guys and the Bad Guys (1969) with Kennedy, The McMasters (1970), and Macho Callahan (1970). He was unhappy playing villains and told his agent he wanted to stop, which led to his not working in Hollywood for a year. He was cast in a musical, The Ballad of Johnny Pot, but fired two days before opening night on Broadway. In 1972, he co-starred as "Big" Bill Shelly in one of Martin Scorsese's earliest films, Boxcar Bertha, which starred Barbara Hershey, his partner at the time. This was one of several Roger Corman productions in which he appeared. It was also one of a handful of acting collaborations he did with his father. He made his feature directorial debut with the film You and Me, starring alongside Hershey and his brothers Keith and Robert. It was shot in 1972, between making the Kung Fu pilot and the series, but released in 1975.

=== Kung Fu ===
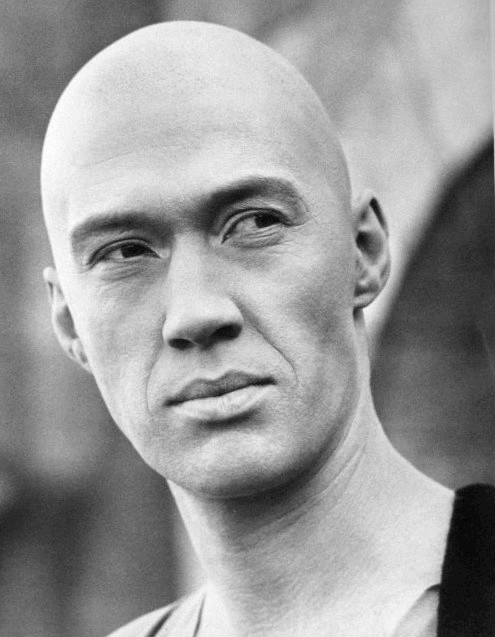
Carradine as Caine

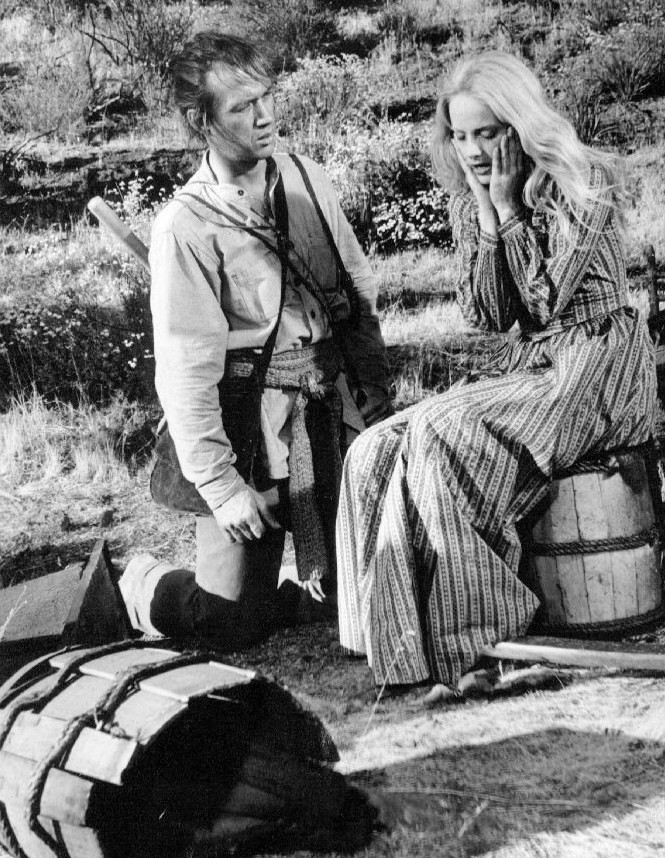
With guest star Sondra Locke, 1974

For three seasons, Carradine starred as the half-Chinese/half-white American Shaolin monk Kwai Chang Caine in the ABC hit TV series Kung Fu (1972–1975). The role was nominated for an Emmy and a Golden Globe Award. Along with Bruce Lee films, Kung Fu helped popularize the martial arts and Eastern philosophy in the west. Carradine's character also brought the term "grasshopper" (referring to an apprentice) into popular culture.

Although the choice of a non-Asian to play the role of Kwai Chang Caine stirred controversy, the show provided steady employment for a number of Asian-American actors. In addition to Keye Luke and Philip Ahn, who held leading roles in the cast as Caine's Shaolin masters, Robert Ito, James Hong, Benson Fong, Richard Loo, and Victor Sen Yung frequently appeared in the series. A second controversy was over whose idea the series had been. Bruce Lee's widow claimed he had come up with the idea of a wandering monk in the Old West, but Ed Spielman, the series' creator, insisted that the concept was his own idea from years before Lee became a star. In an interview from 2005 Carradine disputed Bruce Lee's claim: "That's mythology. I think the way that story started was that they got it mixed up with The Silent Flute. Not sure how that happened." In his authoritative biography Bruce Lee: A Life, Matthew Polly clarifies the issue of Bruce Lee's involvement, concluding that the claim was the result of his not being cast for the leading role, and that he had no participation in the creation of the series.

Kung Fu ended due to several factors. It has been said that Carradine left the show after sustaining injuries that made it impossible for him to continue. While Carradine mentioned it when talking about his work in film, other causes involved were Carradine's burnout, changes in the writing and shooting that altered the show's quality, and changes in the time slot, which led to audience decline. Finally, the main reason was Carradine's decision to quit to pursue a career as a film actor and filmmaker. Also, the bad publicity from a 1974 peyote-related incident involving Carradine affected the ratings; Radames Pera described it as sabotage, which Carradine himself acknowledged had been detrimental to the series. Carradine's annual salary on the show was reportedly $100,000.

=== Film stardom ===
Immediately after Kung Fu, Carradine accepted the role of the racecar driver Frankenstein in Death Race 2000 (1975), he said, to "kill the image of Caine and launch a movie career." The role had originally been offered to Peter Fonda, who was not available. The film, directed by Paul Bartel and produced by Roger Corman, became a cult classic for New World Pictures. Carradine got 10% of the profits and made significant money from it. Carradine was tapped to play Duke Leto Atreides in Alejandro Jodorowsky's aborted Dune adaptation in the late 1970s. In 1976, he earned critical praise for his portrayal of folksinger Woody Guthrie in Hal Ashby's Bound for Glory, for which he won a National Board of Review Award for Best Actor and was nominated for a Golden Globe Award and New York Film Critics Circle Award. Carradine worked very closely with his friend, singer-songwriter-guitarist Guthrie Thomas, on the film. Thomas assisted Carradine in the guitar style of the period and the songs that had been chosen to be in the film.

In 1978, Carradine starred in Deathsport, an unofficial sequel to Death Race 2000. When Bruce Lee died in 1973, he left an unreleased script he developed with James Coburn and Stirling Silliphant, The Silent Flute. The script became Circle of Iron (1978), and in the film, Carradine played the four roles originally intended for Lee. Carradine considered this among his best work.

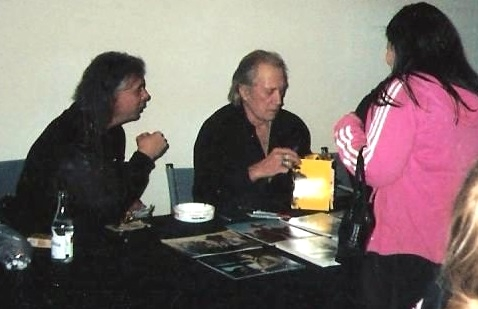
Carradine signing autographs in Malmö, Sweden in May 2005

=== Directing work and 1980s-90s career ===
Carradine returned to the director's chair with Americana (1981), which he also starred in, produced and edited. The film took ten years to complete due to difficulty in financing. It featured several of his friends and family members in supporting roles. It won the People's Choice Award at the Director's Fortnight at Cannes, but failed to achieve critical support or adequate distribution. He also directed the unreleased Mata Hari, an epic that starred his daughter, Calista.

In 1984, Carradine starred in the movie The Warrior and the Sorceress, one of several sword-and-sorcery, direct-to-video movies produced in Argentina by Roger Corman.

Carradine attracted notice in 1985 when he appeared in a major supporting role in North and South, a miniseries about the American Civil War, as the evil and abusive Justin LaMotte. He was nominated for a Golden Globe for Best Supporting Actor for his performance.

Carradine reprised his role as Caine in Kung Fu: The Movie (1986) for TV, which he also produced. It was the acting debut of Bruce Lee's son, Brandon Lee.

He remained in demand as the star for cheaper action films, including straight-to-video, throughout the 80s and 90s.

In a 2005 interview, Carradine talks about a period in his career in which he worked as much as he could. Psychotronic Magazine gave him an award for the "Most Working Actor in the Universe". Carradine commented that he received it "because I did nineteen movies in eighteen months. And they actually missed a couple!" He further stated, "That whole era of independent movies died. They clotted the market. I didn't know how to get out of that, so I did [the second series of Kung Fu]".

=== Kung Fu: The Legend Continues ===
Carradine played the part of the grandson and namesake of the original Kwai Chang Caine in Kung Fu: The Legend Continues, a new TV series that ran from 1993 to 1997, and consisted of 88 episodes. Carradine also worked as a producer and directed one episode. In 1997, Carradine was awarded a star on the Hollywood Walk of Fame. The presenters played an April Fool's Day prank on him by first unveiling a star bearing the name of his brother, Robert.

In the early 2000s Carradine was increasingly becoming a support actor in films.

=== Kill Bill ===
Carradine enjoyed a revival of his fame when he was cast in Quentin Tarantino's Kill Bill films, Kill Bill: Volume 1 (2003) and Kill Bill: Volume 2 (2004). Scott Mantz of The Mediadrome said of his performance, "Carradine practically steals every scene he's in with confident gusto, and he gives a soulful performance that should all but ensure a spot on next year's Oscar ballot." Roger Ebert and Richard Roeper both had Kill Bill Vol. 2 on their top ten list for Academy Awards predictions. Although the films received no notice from the Academy, Carradine did receive a Golden Globe nomination and a Saturn Award for Best Supporting Actor for his portrayal of Bill.

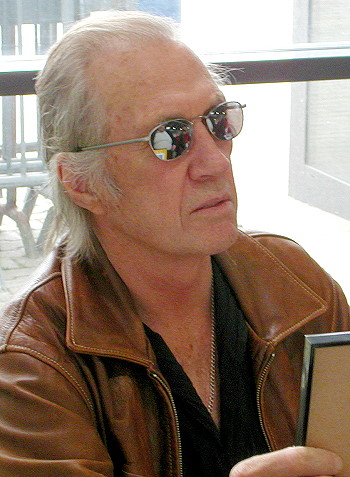
Carradine in 2005

=== Posthumous releases ===
Carradine still had approximately a dozen films in post-production at the time of his death in 2009. Most of these roles were cameos or small parts in independent, direct-to-DVD productions.

Carradine appeared in a minor role in Yuen Woo-ping's Chinese kung fu epic True Legend; they had first met while filming Kill Bill. Yuen eulogized Carradine on the True Legend website, describing him as a "good friend". Yuen said of Carradine:

He is among the first Hollywood actors to perform Chinese martial arts on the big screen. In real life he is also a genuine kung fu fan, and knows tai chi, qi gong and Chinese medicine. Same as I, people shall always remember his role as Caine, the grasshopper, in Kung Fu, in the '70s, which was a really unforgettable performance. I feel both great honour and regret that True Legend is one of David Carradine's last works.

His final released film was the cult independent film Night of the Templar (2013), directed by his friend Paul Sampson.

Carradine co-produced a full-length documentary about luthier Stuart Mossman, which has been identified as the actor's last film appearance. The Legend of Stuart Mossman: A Modern Stradivari, directed by Barry Brown, premiered at the Santa Barbara International Film Festival, in February 2010.

== Martial artist ==
Carradine knew nothing of the practice of kung fu at the time he was cast in the role of Kwai Chang Caine; instead, he relied on his experience as a dancer for the part. He also had experience in sword fighting, boxing, and street fighting on which to draw. For the first half of the original series, David Chow provided technical assistance with kung fu, followed by Kam Yuen, who became Carradine's martial arts instructor. He never considered himself a master of the art, but rather an "evangelist" of kung fu. By 2003, he had acquired enough expertise in martial arts to produce and star in several instructional videos on tai chi and Qigong. In 2005, Carradine visited the Shaolin Monastery in Henan, China, as part of the extra features for the third season of the Kung Fu DVDs. During his visit, the abbot, Shi Yǒngxìn, said that he recognized Carradine's important contribution to the promotion of the Shaolin Monastery and kung fu culture, to which Carradine replied, "I am happy to serve."

== Music career ==
In addition to his acting career, Carradine was a musician. He sang and played the piano, the guitar, and the flute, among other instruments. In 1970, Carradine played one half of a flower power beatnik duo in the season 4 Ironside episode, "The Quincunx", performing the songs "I Stepped on a Flower", "Lonesome Stranger", and "Sorrow of the Singing Tree". He recorded an album titled Grasshopper, which was released in 1975. His musical talents were often integrated into his screen performances. He performed several of Woody Guthrie's songs for the film Bound for Glory. For the Kung Fu series, he made flutes out of bamboo that he had planted on the Warner Brothers lot. He later made several flutes for the film Circle of Iron, one of which he later played in Kill Bill. Carradine wrote and performed the theme songs for at least two films that he starred in, Americana and Sonny Boy. The first line from the Sonny Boy theme, "Paint", which he wrote while filming Americana in 1973, is engraved on his headstone. He wrote and performed several songs for American Reel (2003) and wrote the score for You and Me. He and his brother, Robert, also performed with a band, the Cosmic Rescue Team (also known as Soul Dogs). The band performed primarily in small venues and at charity benefits.

== Personal life and death ==
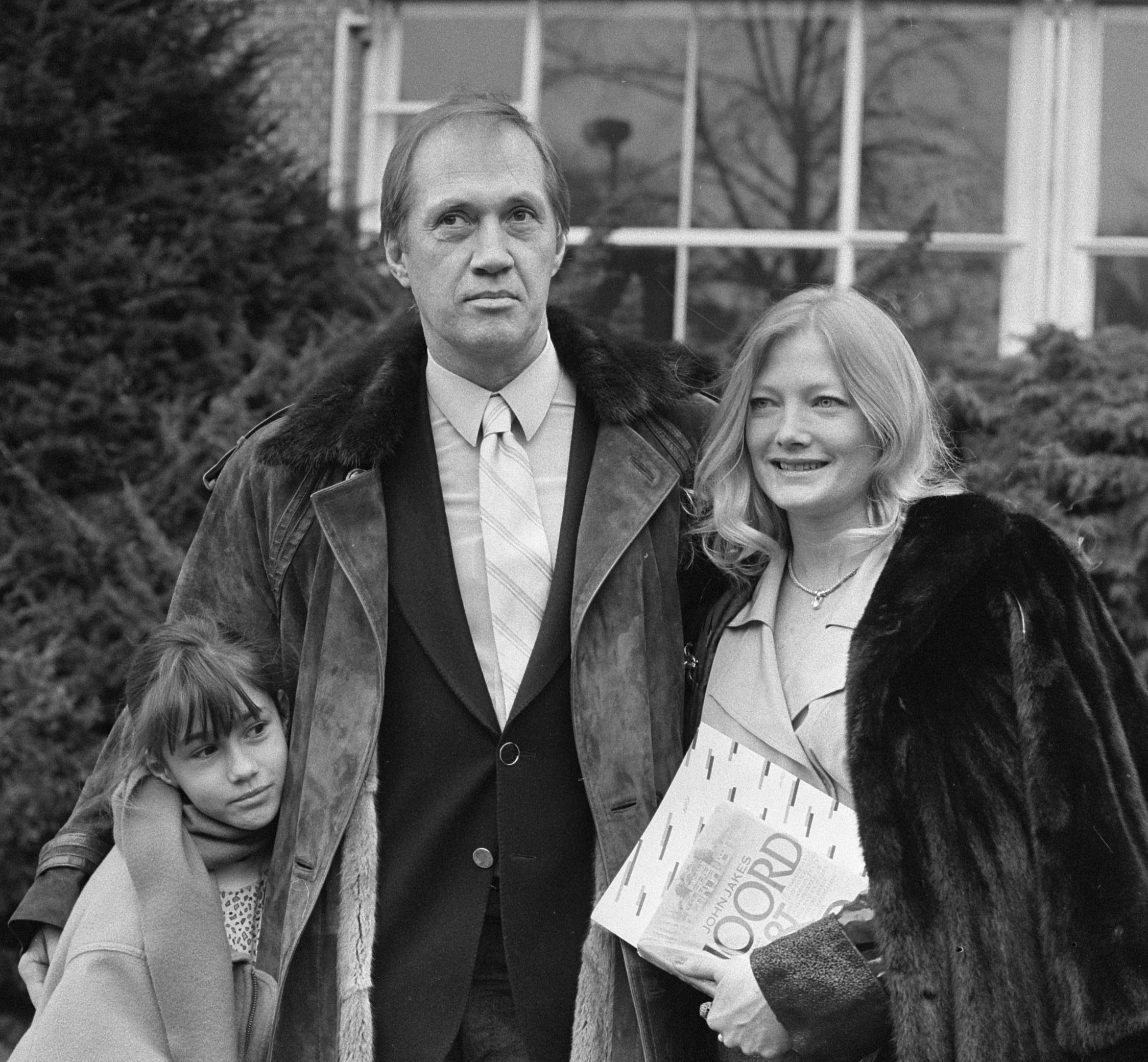
Carradine and his daughter with wife Gail in 1987

Shortly after being drafted into the U.S. Army in 1960, Carradine proposed to Donna Lee Becht whom he had met when they were students at Oakland High School; they married on Christmas Day that year. She lived with him off-base when he was stationed at Fort Eustis in Virginia. She gave birth to their daughter who became an actress.. After Carradine's discharge, the family lived in New York while Carradine established his acting career, appearing on Broadway in The Deputy and Royal Hunt of the Sun. The marriage dissolved in 1968, whereupon Carradine left New York and headed back to California to continue his television and film careers.

In 1968, Carradine met actress Barbara Hershey while the two of them were working on Heaven with a Gun. The pair lived together until 1975. They appeared in other films together, including Martin Scorsese's Boxcar Bertha. In 1972, they appeared together in a nude Playboy spread, recreating some sex scenes from Boxcar Bertha. That year, Hershey gave birth to their son. The couple's relationship fell apart around the time of Carradine's 1974 burglary arrest, when Carradine began an affair with Season Hubley, who had guest-starred on Kung Fu. Carradine was engaged to Hubley for a time, but they never married.

In February 1977, Carradine married his second wife Linda (née Linda Anne Gilbert) in a civil ceremony in Munich, Germany, after filming The Serpent's Egg. Gilbert was previously married to Roger McGuinn of The Byrds. They had a daughter. Carradine's second marriage ended in divorce, as did the two that followed: he was married to Gail Jensen from 1986 to 1997, and to Marina Anderson from 1998 to 2001.

On December 26, 2004, Carradine married his fifth wife, widow Annie Bierman (née Anne Kirstie Fraser; born in 1960) at the seaside Malibu home of his friend Michael Madsen. Vicki Roberts, his attorney and a longtime friend of his wife's, performed the ceremony. With this marriage he acquired three stepdaughters as well as a stepson. In one of his final interviews, Carradine stated that at 71, he was still "in excellent shape", attributing it to a good diet and having a youthful circle of friends. "Everybody that I know is at least 10 or 20 years younger than I am. My wife Annie is 24 years younger than I am. My daughter asks why I don't hang with women my age and I say, 'Most of the women my age are a lot older than me!'"

=== Arrests and prosecutions ===
In the late 1950s, while living in San Francisco, Carradine was arrested for assaulting a police officer. He pleaded guilty to a lesser charge of disturbing the peace. While in the Army, he faced court-martial on more than one occasion for shoplifting. After he became an established actor and had changed his name to David, he was arrested in 1967 for possession of marijuana.

In 1974, at the height of his popularity in Kung Fu, Carradine was arrested again, this time for attempted burglary and malicious mischief. While under the influence of peyote, Carradine began wandering nude around his Laurel Canyon neighborhood. He broke into a neighbor's home, smashing a window and cutting his arm, and accosted two young women, allegedly assaulting one while asking her if she was a witch. Carradine pleaded no contest to the mischief charge and was given probation. He was never charged with assault, but the young woman sued him for $1.1 million and was awarded $20,000.

In 1980, while in South Africa filming Safari 3000 (also known as Rally), which co-starred Stockard Channing, Carradine was arrested for possession of marijuana. He was convicted and given a suspended sentence. He claimed that he had been framed by the apartheid government, as he had been seen dancing with Tina Turner.

During the 1980s, Carradine was arrested at least twice for driving under the influence of alcohol, once in 1984 and again in 1989. In the second case, Carradine pleaded no contest. Of this incident, the Los Angeles Times reported: "Legal experts say Carradine was handed a harsher-than-average sentence, even for a second-time offender: three years' summary probation, 48 hours in jail, 100 hours of community service, 30 days' work picking up trash for the California Department of Transportation, attendance at a drunk driving awareness meeting and completion of an alcohol rehabilitation program."

In 1994, in Toronto, filming Kung Fu: The Legend Continues, Carradine was arrested for kicking in a door at the SkyDome while attending a Rolling Stones concert. He later claimed that he was trying to avoid being swarmed by fans.

=== Death ===
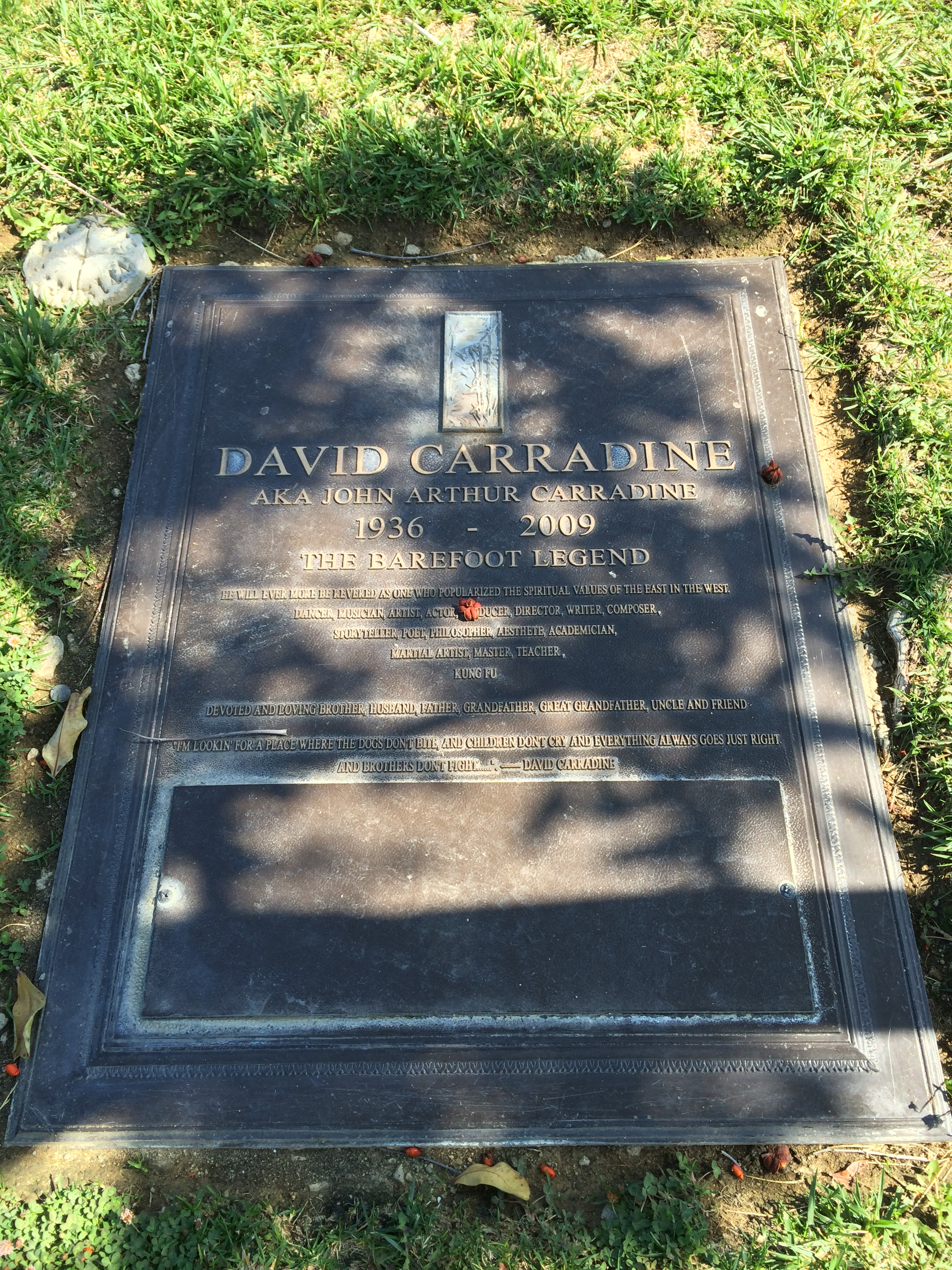
Grave of David Carradine at Forest Lawn Hollywood Hills

Carradine arrived in Bangkok, Thailand, on May 31, 2009, to shoot the film Stretch. He was last seen alive on June 3, but he could not be contacted after he failed to appear for a meal with the film crew.

On June 4, Carradine was found dead in his room at the Swissôtel Nai Lert Park Hotel, at the age of 72. Lieutenant Teerapop Luanseng and Lieutenant Colonel Pirom Jantrapirom said that Carradine was found naked and had hanged himself in the room's closet with a curtain cord. Police said he had been dead for at least 12 hours and found no sign of struggle. Thai police suggested the death might have been from accidental suffocation, since there was no suicide note and he was found with a rope tied to both his neck and his genitals. His funeral was held on June 13. On July 1, 2009, Michael Baden, the medical examiner hired by Carradine's family to conduct his autopsy, stated that the actor died from asphyxiation, and that the way Carradine's body was bound allowed him to rule out suicide.

== Awards and honors ==
- 1966: Winner – Theatre World Award, for The Royal Hunt of the Sun
- 1973: Nominee – Primetime Emmy Award. Outstanding Continued Performance by an Actor in a Leading Role (Drama Series – Continuing), for Kung Fu
- 1974: Nominee – Golden Globe Awards. Best Television Actor – Drama Series, for Kung Fu
- 1974: Winner – TP de Oro, Spain. Mejor actor extranjero (Best Foreign Actor), for Kung Fu
- 1974: Nominee – TP de Oro, Spain. Personaje más popular (Most Popular Character), for Kung Fu
- 1976: Winner – National Board of Review Award. Best Actor, for Bound for Glory
- 1976: Nominee – New York Film Critics Circle Award. Best Actor, for Bound for Glory
- 1977: Nominee – Golden Globe Awards. Best Actor – Motion Picture Drama, for Bound for Glory
- 1986: Nominee – Golden Globe Awards. Best Supporting Actor – Television, for North and South
- 1997: Honoree – Gold Star on the Hollywood Walk of Fame, Television
- 1998: Honoree – Golden Boot Award (along with brothers Keith and Robert)
- 2004: Winner – The Golden Schmoes award. Best Supporting Actor, for Kill Bill (V2)
- 2004: Honoree – Capri, Hollywood International Film Festival, Capri Legend Award.
- 2005: Winner – Saturn Award. Best Supporting Actor, for Kill Bill: Volume 2
- 2005: Nominee – Golden Globe Awards. Best Supporting Actor – Motion Picture, for Kill Bill (Vol.2)
- 2005: Winner – EW.com Award – Annual prize bestowed on deserving Golden Globe nominees, for Kill Bill – Vol.2
- 2005: Nominee – 31º People's Choice Awards. Favorite Villain Movie Star, for Bill in Kill Bill – Vol. 2.
- 2005: Nominee – Gold Derby award. Supporting Actor, for Bill in Kill Bill, Volume 2
- 2005: Nominee – Satellite Award, Best Supporting Actor – Drama, for Kill Bill: Volume 2
- 2005: Nominee – Online Film & Television Association, OFTA Awards. Best Supporting Actor, for Kill Bill, Vol. 2
- 2005: Nominee – Online Film Critics Society Awards 2004. Best Supporting Actor, for Kill Bill: Volume 2
- 2005: Winner – Action on Film International Film Festival, Lifetime Achievement Award – First annual recipient
- 2005: Nominee – Albo d'oro, Italian Online Movie Awards (IOMA). Miglior attore non protagonista (Best Supporting Actor), per Kill Bill volume 2
- 2008: Honoree – Bronze plaque on the Walk of Western Stars
- 2010: Mención especial del jurado (Special Mention by the Jury) – Fancine – Festival de Cine Fantástico de la Universidad de Málaga (Málaga International Week of Fantastic Cinema), for Kandisha
- 2013: Honoree – Hollywood Museum, Exhibition "The Barefoot Legend: David Carradine – a Contemporary Renaissance Man"
- 2014: Inductee – Martial Arts History Museum, Hall of Fame

== Bibliography ==
- The Spirit of Shaolin. Boston: Tuttle Publishing. 1991. ISBN 0-8048-1751-0. (See Shaolin Kung Fu)
- David Carradine's Tai Chi Workout. London: Boxtree. 1994. ISBN 1-85283-475-7. Co-authored with David Nakahara.
- Endless Highway. Boston: Tuttle Publishing. 1995. ISBN 1-885203-20-9. (Autobiography)
- David Carradine's Tai Chi Workout. New York: Henry Holt and Company. 1995. ISBN 0-8050-3767-5. Co-authored with David Nakahara.
- David Carradine's Introduction to Chi Kung. New York: Henry Holt and Company. 1997. ISBN 0-8050-5100-7. Co-authored with David Nakahara. (Alternate transliteration is Qigong)
- "The Barefoot Chronicles". David-Carradine.com. Archived from the original on July 13, 2016. Compilation of 19 articles published as a regular section in the magazine Inside Kung Fu, from November 2003 onwards.
- The Kill Bill Diary: The Making of a Tarantino Classic as Seen Through the Eyes of a Screen Legend. New York: Harper Publishing. 2006. ISBN 0-06-082346-1.

== Discography ==
- You And Me (vinyl single). Billy. c. 1973.
- Jim Helms, David Carradine, Keye Luke, Philip Ahn, Radames Pera (1973). Kung Fu – Music & Dialogue From The Warner Bros. T.V. Series (vinyl album). United States: Warner Bros. Records.
- Grasshopper (vinyl album). United Kingdom: Jet Records. 1975.
- Around (vinyl single). United Kingdom: Jet Records. 1975.
- Cosmic Joke (vinyl single). United Kingdom: Jet Records. 1976.
- Woody Guthrie, Leonard Rosenman, David Carradine (1976). Bound For Glory – Original Motion Picture Score (vinyl album). Canada: United Artists Records.
- Jesus Christ (vinyl single). Germany: United Artists Record. 1976.
- David Carradine, Gail Jensen, Michael Shanklin (1983). Señor Problemas (Troublemaker) (vinyl single). Argentina: MICSA.
- David Carradine, Michael Shanklin, Tamila Jensen, Gail Jensen (1985). Walk the Floor (vinyl single). United States: Coop Records.
- David Carradine's Mata Hari Suite. Music for The Film (CD). United States: ZumaGold. c. 1990.
- David Carradine As Is (CD). United States: Panartist. 2001.
