= Mata Hari (unfinished film) =

Film directed by David Carradine

Mata Hari is an American feature film about Mata Hari directed by David Carradine. It starred his daughter Calista Carradine. He started filming it in the 1970s but it had never been finished. It was his second directorial effort after You and Me.

Interest in the project was revived when Richard Linklater shot Boyhood over a long period of time. A documentary of the same name, directed by Joe Beshenkovsky and James Smith, features footage of the film and deals with the relationship between David and Calista during the making of it. It was released in 2025 at the 82nd Venice International Film Festival, where it won the Best Documentary on Cinema award.

== Cast ==
- Calista Carradine
- David Carradine
- John Barrymore

== Production ==
Carradine later said he got the idea to make the film when he was living with Barbara Hershey. A Dutch director wrote a film for her and they want to make it in Holland. While there, Carradine started steeping himself in the Mata Hari story. He originally intended it to be a vehicle for Hershey but then they broke up.

Carradine became interested in the project again when his daughter expressed interest in being it. He decided to shoot the film over the years, so Calista could age. He hired a writer and started filming it in 1977 when Calista was 15. He said at the time he expected it to take 17 years to finish. He said it was about "Mata Hari the dancer, Mata Hari the liar, Mata Hari the spy, Mata Hari the free spirit."

They went to India for two weeks with about 12,000 feet of film stock and shot some footage. After that, they would film for about two weeks a year every year. In 1979 he said he had shot seven hours of footage. "I'm really excited about it," he said. "It's the high point of my life these days."

In 1981, he said "the film will probably not exist at a single level of reality. It may be three movies."

In 1989, he said "She's always loved it... It was created for her and at certain times in her life it's been the most important thing in her life. We shoot one or two weeks every year and I edit it in my spare time and write it in my spare time. The writing stays just a little ahead of what we're shooting. The original end date was 1992. We might make that, but we might stretch it out a little longer."

In 2004, he said "I'm just about done with the first film. Maybe one more scene to do."

== See also ==
- List of films with longest production time
