= Rialto Municipal Airport =

Former general aviation airport in Rialto, California

Rialto Municipal Airport Miro Field
- IATA: none; ICAO: none; FAA LID: L67

Summary
- Airport type: Public
- Operator: City of Rialto
- Location: Rialto, California
- Elevation AMSL: 1,455 ft (443 m)
- Coordinates: 34°07′46″N 117°24′06″W
- Interactive map of Rialto Municipal Airport

Runways
| Direction | Length | | Surface |
| Direction | ft | m | Surface |
|---|---|---|---|
| 6/24 | 4,500 | 1,372 | Asphalt |
| 17/35 | 2,650 | 808 | Asphalt |
- Officially closed on September 18, 2014

Transient parking in front of the Art Scholl Aviation building

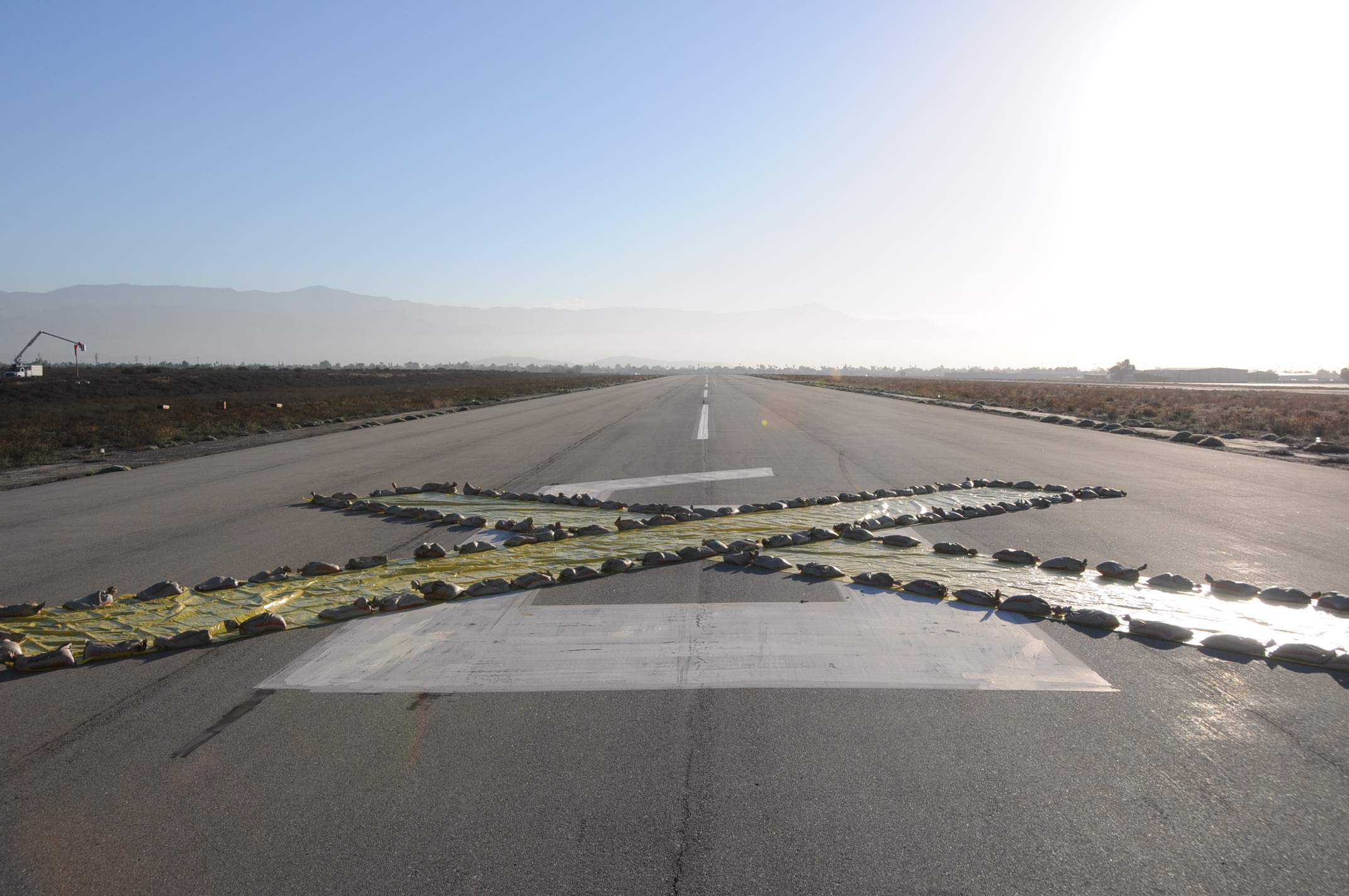
Rialto Airport, closed

Rialto Municipal Airport (FAA LID: L67), originally Miro Field, was a general aviation airport three miles (5 km) northwest of Rialto, in San Bernardino County, California, United States.

It was used by private aircraft; no airlines flew into this airport. It was about 12 miles northeast of Ontario International Airport and ten miles west of San Bernardino International Airport. The airport did not have a control tower and averaged 82 operations a day.

An FBO with a flight school and a separate helicopter flight school operated at the airport. There were several aviation related businesses. Warbirds West Air Museum is relocating its warbird collection to the big hangar at the center of the field. The airport cafe is attached to the WWAM hangar. There was an air ambulance business in the southeast part of the airport.

Despite its size compared to nearby airfields (Upland Cable Airport, Corona Municipal Airport, El Monte Municipal Airport, Redlands Municipal Airport and Hemet-Ryan Airport), Rialto was a relatively quiet airport. This led the city of Rialto to approve the closing of the airport by 2009/2010 for redevelopment, driven by real estate developers. The airport was expected to close by January or February 2015, once the San Bernardino County Sheriff's Department Aviation Division relocated to the San Bernardino International Airport. Development of Renaissance Marketplace was planned to begin as soon as the airport closed and the runways were removed. On September 18, 2014, the airport officially closed to air traffic; half of the former airport property showed as developed as of March 21, 2024 satellite imagery; all pavement had been removed and very little evidence of runways and taxiways remain.

== History ==
The land which became Rialto Airport, about 40 acres (16 ha), was purchased by Sam Miro in 1944. In 1966 the City of Rialto obtained the property while bringing the area to 60 acres (24 ha).

In 1978 Art Scholl Aviation, founded by Art Scholl, relocated to Rialto Airport from nearby Flabob Airport in Riverside.

Since 1984 the City of Rialto accepted more than US$15 million in federal aid for airport improvement and land purchases.

On September 18, 2014, the airport was officially closed.

== Facilities ==
Rialto Municipal Airport covered 600 acres (240 ha) and had two asphalt runways: 6/24 was 4,500 by 100 feet (1,372 m × 30 m) and 17/35 was 2,650 by 50 feet (808 m × 15 m).
