= Walnut Valley (Highgate, Virginia) =

Historic house in Virginia, United States

- U.S. National Register of Historic Places
- Virginia Landmarks Register
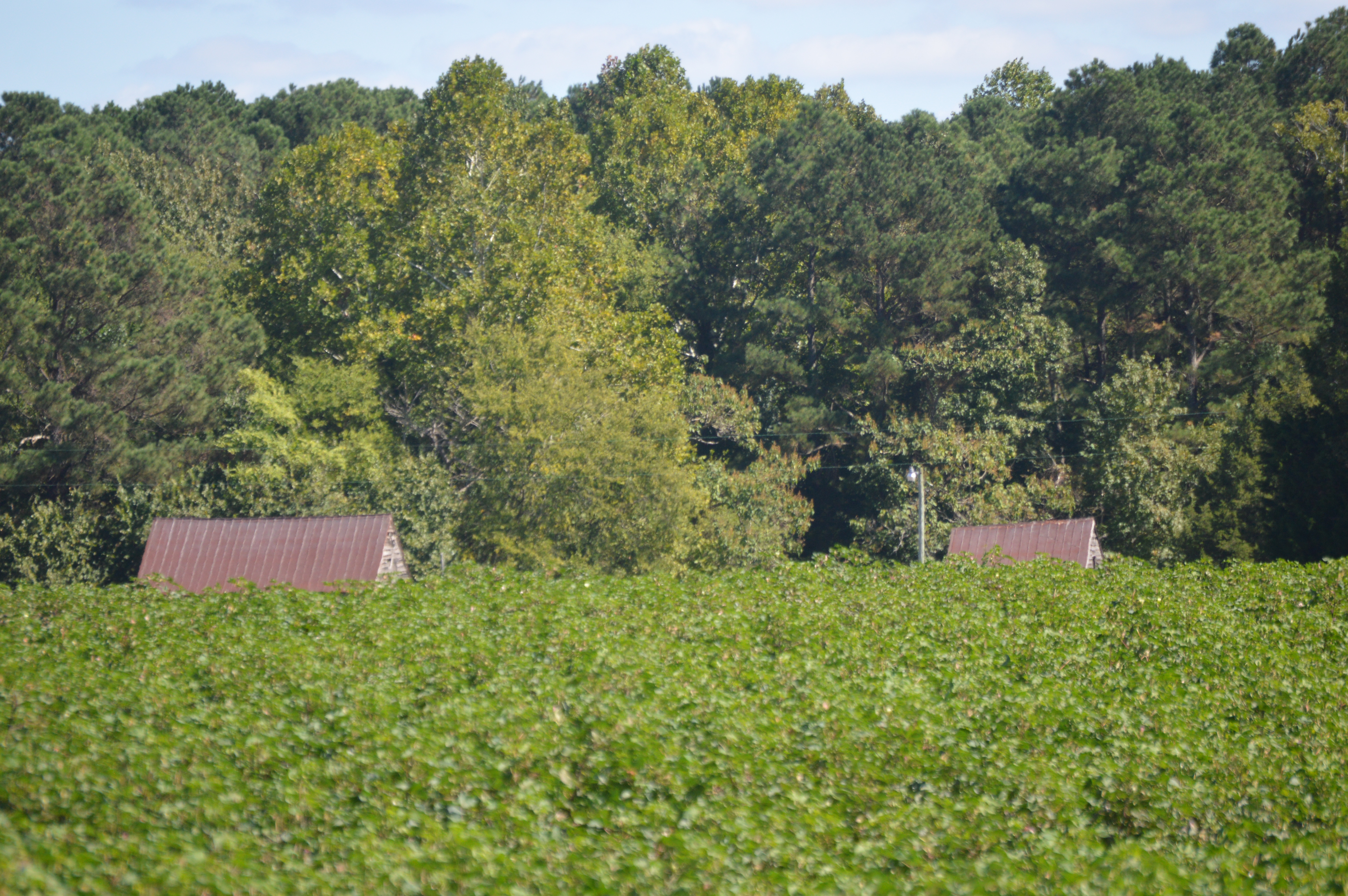
- Fields and buildings at the site

- Location within Virginia Location within the United States
- Location: Southeastern corner of Highgate and Chippokes Farm Rds, near Highgate, Virginia
- Coordinates: 37°07′15″N 76°44′33″W
- Area: 262.91 acres (106.40 ha)
- Built: c. 1770, 1816
- Architectural style: Postmedieval English, Federal
- NRHP reference No.: 13000649
- VLR No.: 090-0023

Significant dates
- Added to NRHP: August 27, 2013
- Designated VLR: June 19, 2013

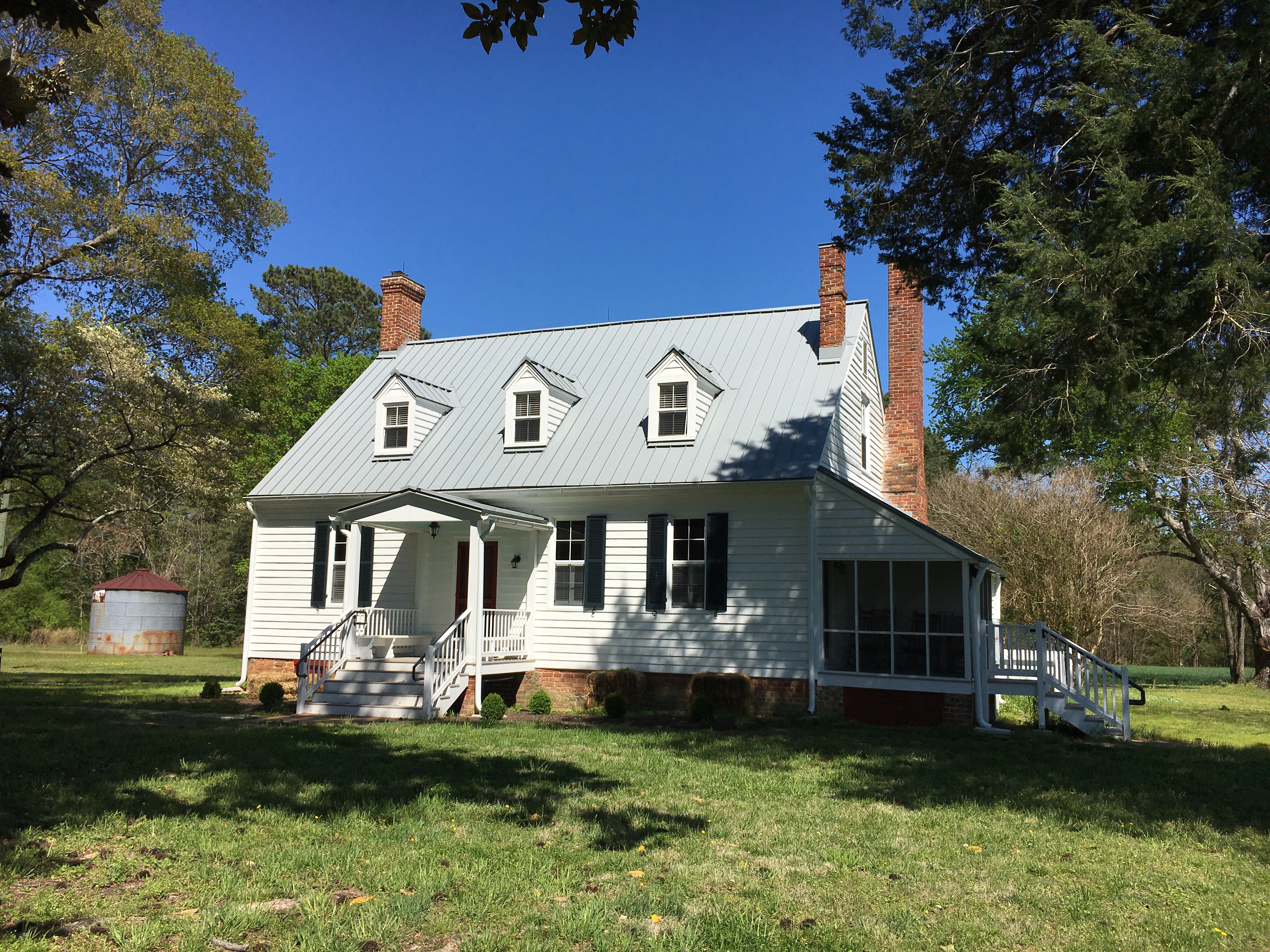
The circa 1770 Walnut Valley House, likely built by Robert Jones.

Walnut Valley is a historic plantation house and archaeological site located near Highgate, Surry County, Virginia. The property includes a plantation house (c. 1770), a frame slave quarter (1816), a frame kitchen (1816), seven contributing 19th- and 20th-century agricultural and domestic outbuildings and structures, and an archaeological site. The house is a 1 1/2-story, four-bay, double-pile, side-gabled frame house on a brick foundation. It measures 40 feet, 4 inches, by 30 feet, 5 inches and features Federal style decorative elements. The one-story, two-bay frame slave quarter measures 14 feet by 16 feet, and is clad in weatherboard. The contributing outbuildings include a late-19th century storehouse and a granary, well house, silo, and three chicken houses. The property was conveyed to the Commonwealth of Virginia for the Virginia Department of Conservation and Recreation on January 14, 2004. It is now contained within Chippokes Plantation State Park.

It was listed on the National Register of Historic Places in 2013.

== History ==
Walnut Valley Plantation was established in 1636 when William Newsum, Jr. was granted 550 acres of land in Surry County, Virginia. Newsum was an English colonist who had paid for eleven other colonists to travel to Virginia, a practice which carried the promise of land from the English Crown. For each person whose passage was paid, the colonist who paid for it would receive 50 acres of land. Out of the eleven people Newsum brought to Virginia, he is known to have married three (possibly four) of them. These women were Penelope Ramsey, Sarah Fisher, Elizabeth Wilson, and Gertrude. Gertrude was Newsum's final wife, outliving him.

Newsum may have left Walnut Valley to William Batte, a non-relative, in order to pay off debts. Batte sold the plantation to Ralph Jones in 1657.

An unrelated Jones, James Jones, had come to own Walnut Valley by 1704. The house was built by James' son or grandson, both named Richard Jones, around 1770. In 1806, Richard Jones, Jr. died without heir, and instead left the plantation to his unrelated overseer, William Jones. William, by a strange coincidence, was a distant relative of William Batte, and would own Walnut Valley for the next three decades.

The 1810 census recorded fourteen enslaved individuals at Walnut Valley Plantation. The remaining slave quarter and detached kitchen were added by William Jones in 1816, during a period of growth for the farm. Jones' operation included oxen, mules, cows, sheep, pigs, chickens, ducks, and turkeys. The surrounding fields were planted in cotton, corn, and peas, and cordwood provided late-season income. Like many plantations in Surry County, Walnut Valley also produced peach and apple brandy, and featured orchards, a cider press, apple mill, and distillery. Under Jones' management, Walnut Valley exploded in productivity, due in large part to the enslaved labor force he maintained. By Jones' death in 1833, thirty enslaved workers toiled on his plantation.

Jones' son, Bolling Green Jones, inherited the plantation, as well as guardianship of his two younger siblings, William C. and Minerva. Their mother, Ann, had died sometime in the decade previous. Bolling Jones continued his father's agricultural practices, notably amending the soil with lime in the form of marl from nearby fossil deposits. This improved crop yield by 25-100%, making Bolling Jones a wealthy man. He added seven more enslaved laborers to his workforce, valued at over $20,000 (~$531,695 in 2024) when Bolling died in 1855.

Bolling Jones' widow, Henrietta Edwards Jones, was left in control of Walnut Valley, with the provision that after her death the property would be conveyed to Bolling's two younger siblings. Minerva and William, however, felt that if they waited out the rest of their sister-in-law's natural life, their inheritance would depreciate. For this reason, the two petitioned the court of Surry County to allow them to take ownership of Henrietta's property, and in 1858 they were successful. Minerva and her husband, Blair Pegram, bought out William's share, and the Pegrams took up residence at Walnut Valley. Nothing is known of what became of Henrietta Jones.

The Pegrams experienced the Civil War while living at Walnut Valley. Despite this, archaeological evidence found during renovations in 2017 indicates that they were still able to purchase new dishes and furniture during the war years. After the war, the Pegrams' wealth, largely tied up in human chattel, drastically decreased. The fact that Blair Pegram had paid for his share of the house using Confederate currency caused legal issues well into the 1880s. Sometime between 1865 and 1870, the east chimney caught fire and fell away from the house. The Pegrams extended the house five feet and replaced the original chimney with a haphazardly-constructed, small, square chimney intended for use with a coal stove. By 1904, maintaining Walnut Valley had become too much of a financial strain, and Minerva Pegram leased the property to a tenant farmer named George Washington Mitchell.

Mitchell, his wife Francis, and their descendants continued to occupy Walnut Valley through many changes in ownership. In 1916, Minerva Pegram died, leaving the property to her daughters, May Jones and Carrie Warren. By 1920, both women had died, leaving ownership of Walnut Valley to Carrie's son, Walker Pegram Warren. Warren and his wife, Violet, also owned neighboring Bacon's Castle and resided in Smithfield, Virginia. During their ownership, Walnut Valley's main products were peanuts and hogs. Three generations of the Mitchell family farmed and lived at Walnut Valley during the Warrens' half-century of ownership. When the Warrens died with no heirs in a car accident in 1972, Walnut Valley was sold at auction.

W.W. Reasor of the Reasor Corporation, a Virginia Beach development company, bought the plantation. Despite rumored plans to construct houses on the parcel, Reasor continued to lease the land to the Mitchells until his death in 1999. His widow, Lucy Reasor, donated Walnut Valley Plantation to the State of Virginia in 2004, when it joined Chippokes Plantation State Park, with which it had shared a border. Descendants of the Mitchell family continued to farm the land until 2016.

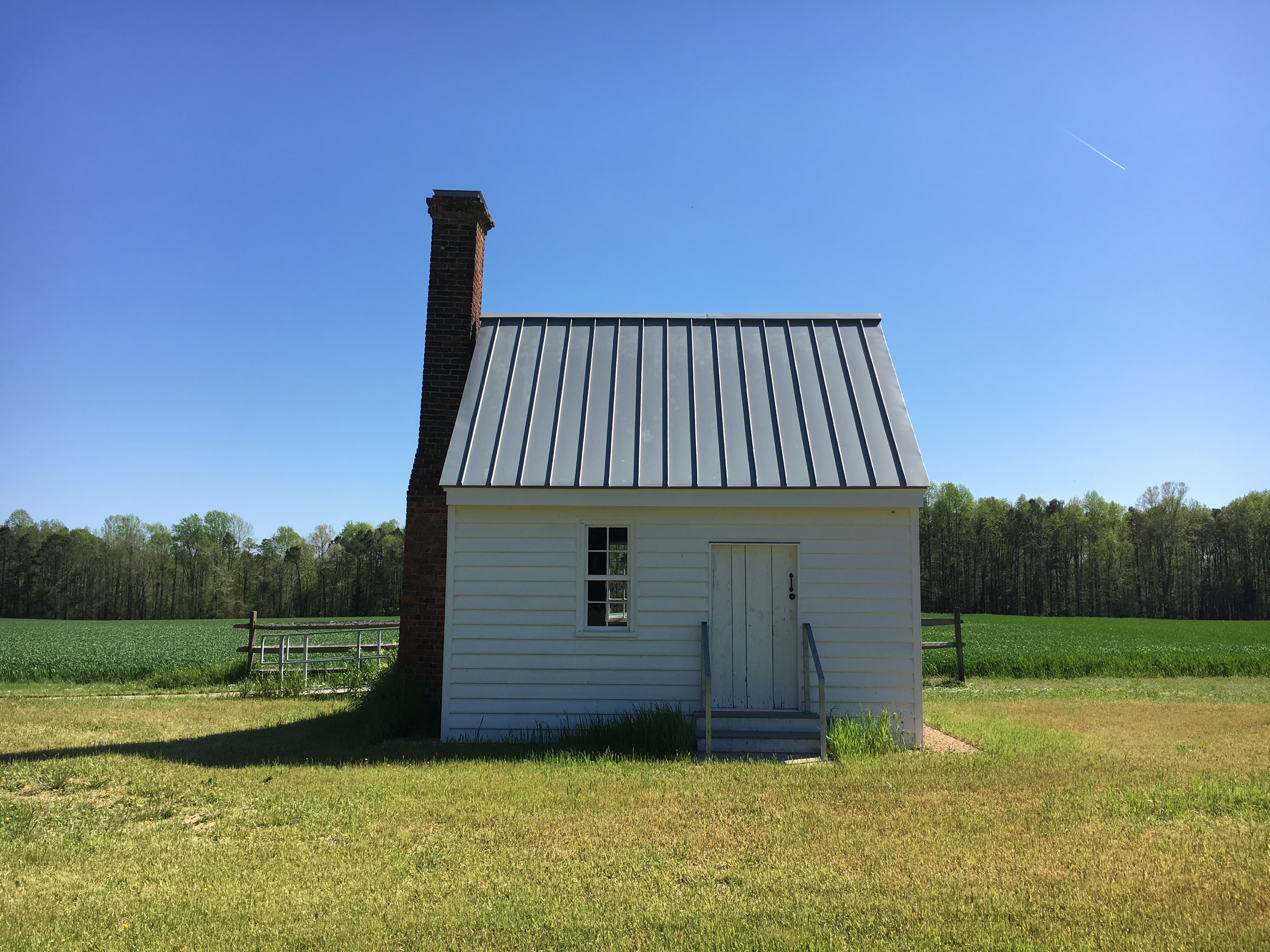
The 1816 Walnut Valley slave quarter, one of the oldest remaining slave quarters in Virginia.

Today, Walnut Valley Plantation and its two 1816 outbuildings (the slave quarter and the detached kitchen) have been carefully restored. The Walnut Valley House is now overnight accommodations available for rental through the park. It is fully accessible for persons with disabilities, as are the restored outbuildings.
