= Barry Brown (director) =

American film director (born 1934)

Barry K. Brown (born October 22, 1934) is an American film director. He directed 1970's The Way We Live Now (on which he was also film editor, cinematographer and producer), 1980's Cloud Dancer (on which he was also producer and co-story writer), A Benefit Celebration: A Tribute to Angela Lansbury (TV special, 1996), and the 2010 documentary Stuart Mossman: A Modern Stradivari. Brown's father is radio producer Himan Brown.
