= Kung Fu: The Movie =

1986 American television film

- Genre: Adventure; Western
- Written by: Durrell Royce Crays
- Directed by: Richard Lang
- Starring: David Carradine
- Music by: Lalo Schifrin
- Country of origin: United States
- Original language: English

Production
- Executive producer: Paul R. Picard
- Producer: Skip Ward
- Production locations: Stage 26, Warner Brothers Burbank Studios - 4000 Warner Boulevard, Burbank, California; Walt Disney's Golden Oak Ranch - 19802 Placerita Canyon Road, Newhall, California; Warner Brothers Ranch, Verdugo Ave. and Pass Avenue, Burbank, California
- Cinematography: Robert Seaman
- Editor: Skip Schoolnik
- Running time: 93 minutes
- Production companies: Lou Step Productions; Warner Bros. Television

Original release
- Network: CBS
- Release: February 1, 1986

Related
- Kung Fu (1972–75); Kung Fu: The Next Generation (1987); Kung Fu: The Legend Continues (1993–97)

Kung Fu: The Movie is a 1986 made-for-television film and the first in a series of sequels which continued the story of the Shaolin monk, Kwai Chang Caine, first introduced in the 1972–1975 television series Kung Fu. David Carradine reprises the role of Caine. The role of his son, Chung Wang, is portrayed by Brandon Lee in his acting debut. The film aired on Brandon's 21st birthday on February 1, 1986. The role of Master Po is also reprised by Keye Luke and The Manchu is portrayed by Mako (Makoto Iwamatsu/岩松松村 信). In the film, the show's hero, Kwai Chang Caine (Carradine), is forced to fight his hitherto unknown son, Chung Wang (Lee).

== Plot ==
1885 (roughly ten years after the timeline set by the series), a place between San Francisco and Sacramento. A mysterious Manchu man arrives in town, with his young companion Chung Wang, who is both his valet and, while being under a magical spell, a killer at his service. The Manchu is looking for a Shaolin priest with a price on his head: Kwai Chang Caine.

Caine, now with graying hair, is leading a quiet life working as a laborer at a warehouse, shielding his countrymen from the cruel foreman, when he gets involved in a crime investigation. The young American missionary Reverend Lawrence Perkins, back from China and apparently insane, gained entrance to a local opium den where he was murdered by the Manchu man. In the course of a general raid of Chinese people led by the vicious Deputy Wyatt, Caine is brought to the open and the missionary's body is found. Caine's knowledge of Chinese drugs and weapons that signal the death was a murder and not caused by "the poppy" attracts the attention of Sheriff Mills, who uses his expertise in the investigation, but also makes of him a suspect.

Mrs. Sarah Perkins, the missionary's widow, pleads for Caine's help in finding the real cause of her husband's death. Caine starts to investigate while helping the Asian-American family whose lodging he shares, and the Manchu's young servant stalks him wherever he goes until Caine goes outside and confronts him.

After a talk in which Chung Wang delivers him sad news about the Shaolin temple and demands to be taught kung fu, Caine invites him to share his lodging, offers him a job at the warehouse, and tries to teach the young man some humility before teaching him kung fu. This lasts until the next day when the young disciple gets into a violent fight with the warehouse's foreman and when stopped by Caine, scorns his master's pacifism. Caine dismisses him. Later, Caine sees Master Po in a vision, confirming the news from China and warning him of danger in a cemetery.

The Manchu's search has put other people on Caine's trail for the reward. Ching, the opium den's host, sets a trap for him using Mrs. Perkins as bait, which results in her flight, both Ching's accidental death and of a henchman of his in the ensuing fight, and Caine's flight. Deputy Wyatt finds on Ching's body Caine's Wanted poster. Later, Mrs. Perkins arrives at his father-in-law's trading company, where she is rendered unconscious by the Manchu man's henchmen. When Caine arrives, the Manchu identifies himself as the father of the Emperor's Nephew whom Caine killed in China, and reveals to him that Chung Wang is his son, fathered shortly before fleeing from China (Kung Fu, s3e15). Having retaken Chung Wang under his control, the Manchu commands him to kill Caine. After an epic fight, Caine escapes and rescues Mrs. Perkins from the Manchu's henchmen, only for him to get arrested by Deputy Wyatt.

At the prison, Sheriff Mills visits Caine, who puts him on the trail to discover a web of corruption related to opium trade. The Sheriff promises to do his best to free Caine if he can prove him innocent. The Manchu also visits Caine; he summons him to a final fight at the local Chinese cemetery on the same date his son died. If Caine doesn't show up, Chung Wang will pay for it with his life. When the Sheriff discovers the proof of the illegal trade, Deputy Wyatt murders him.

At the trial, Caine is accused of Ching and the henchman's deaths, Reverend Perkins' murder; and his situation as a wanted man in China is pointed at. He is found guilty and sentenced to death. Mr. John Martin Perkins III has decided to send his daughter-in-law to China to have his son buried there, and he talks with Deputy Wyatt about their mutual Manchu friend. Caine escapes from prison and takes Mrs. Perkins to a Perkins Trading Company warehouse to see the proof of the opium trade, demonstrating her father-in-law's involvement. Mrs. Perkins goes to denounce the crime to a Federal Marshall, who happens to be also involved in the plot, so, no action is taken. There is nobody else to ask for help: Caine and Mrs. Perkins (who is developing feelings for him) continue the investigation together.

That night, they are watching over a building where the Manchu is testing a flamethrower when Caine is seen on the street by some of his henchmen. A fight ensues, resulting in a henchman burnt to a crisp. Amidst the generalized panic of the passersby, Deputy Wyatt takes Mrs. Perkins, supposedly, to a safe place. In reality, it is a kidnapping to attract Caine to his demise at a warehouse rigged with Manchu spear-throwing devices. In the following fight between Caine, the flying spears, and the corrupt law officer, both the Deputy and Mrs. Perkins are killed.

The next day, at the Chinese cemetery-park where Caine has buried the noble lady, he sees Master Po in a vision admonishing him to seek his inner strength. Then, the final confrontation takes place. In the course of the battle, neither Chung Wang's martial ability nor the Manchu's flamethrower nor his swords and magical powers combined are enough to overcome Caine's kung fu mystical powers. It is revealed to Chung Wang that Caine is his father. Afterward, sitting peacefully in the park, playing his flute and watching Master Po smiling at them, Caine teaches his son to hear the grasshopper that is at his feet. Then, father and son walk together to fight against the opium trade ring.

== Cast ==
- David Carradine as Kwai Chang Caine
- Mako as The Manchu
- Brandon Lee as Chung Wang
- Roy Jenson as Warehouse Foreman
- Paul Rudd as Reverend Lawrence Perkins
- Michael Paul Chan as Ching
- Luke Askew as Sheriff Mills
- William Lucking as Deputy Wyatt
- Kerrie Keane as Mrs. Sarah Perkins
- Martin Landau as John Martin Perkins III
- Benson Fong as The Old One
- Ellen Geer as The Old One's Wife
- Jim Haynie as Federal Marshal
- Keye Luke as Master Po

== Production ==
The feature-length television movie had David Carradine returning as the lead Kwai Chang Caine. The casting of Caine's son took place in 1985, while working as a script reader in Los Angeles. Brandon, the son of martial arts movie star Bruce Lee, was approached by casting director Lynn Stalmaster for the role of Chung Wang and successfully auditioned for his first credited acting role in Kung Fu: The Movie. Brandon's common collaborator Jeff Imada, who worked on the set said that due to the martial arts nature of the film it had no appeal to him, who wanted to be introduced as an actor and not Bruce Lee's son, however he was talked into doing it. Brandon later said that he felt there was some justice in being cast for this role in his first feature, since the TV show's pilot had been conceived for his father.

Kung Fu: The Movie first aired on CBS on February 1, 1986, Lee's 21st birthday.
