= Kung Fu: The Next Generation =

Episode of CBS Summer Playhouse

- Written by: Danny Bilson; Paul De Meo
- Directed by: Tony Wharmby
- Starring: Brandon Lee; David Darlow
- Country of origin: United States
- Original language: English

Production
- Producers: Danny Bilson; Paul De Meo
- Cinematography: Brianne Murphy
- Running time: 60 minutes
- Production companies: Pet Fly Productions; Warner Bros. Television

Original release
- Network: CBS
- Release: June 19, 1987

Related
- Kung Fu; Kung Fu: The Movie; Kung Fu: The Legend Continues

Kung Fu: The Next Generation is a 1987 television pilot which was intended to be a follow-up to the 1972–75 television series, Kung Fu. It was the second follow-up to the series after Kung Fu: The Movie (1986). It tells the story in present-day of the great-grandson of the Shaolin monk (who is also named Kwai Chang Caine after his great-grandfather) played by David Darlow and his son Johnny Caine, portrayed by Brandon Lee. The main supporting cast includes Miguel Ferrer as Mic, Paula Kelly as Lt. Lois S. Poole, and Dominic Barto as Carl Levin.

The pilot was not picked up for a series but in 1987 it aired on CBS Summer Playhouse, a series that aired unsold television pilots. In the 1990s, another follow-up to the series titled Kung Fu: The Legend Continues aired which maintained canon with the original series, while diseregarding the earlier TV movie and the pilot.

== Plot ==
In Los Angeles, Kwai Chang Caine (Darlow) leads a quiet and ascetic life in a house without locks, devoted to the "family business" of serving the community and teaching kung fu that he inherited, together with his name, from the lineage started by his great-grandfather.

One night, friends Johnny (Lee) and Mic (Ferrer) are committing a robbery of antiques. Johnny is determined this will be his last time. Mic inadvertently triggers a silent alarm. When they get out, a guard points at them with his gun. Mic flees. At that juncture, Johnny reluctantly uses his martial arts ability to fight the guard and attempts to reach his motorcycle, but Mic does not wait and escapes. The police arrives, and arrest Johnny.

The next day, Lt. Lois Poole (Kelly) calls Caine Sr. to tell him his son Johnny got arrested. At the police station, Caine Sr. wonders how he failed his son, whom he hasn't seen in over a year. Lt. Poole presents him a proposal: as everyone is aware of his service to the community, Caine Jr. will be released under his custody until trial. Meanwhile, Johnny refuses to snitch on Mic, as the police are looking for the someone who is using young men to commit crimes.

During their walk toward Caine Sr.'s home, the father and the son argue: Johnny refuses to be called Kwai Chang and doesn't want to have anything to do with the "family business;" while his father accuses him of using the knowledge and training he gave him for evil deeds. That same night, Mic arrives surreptitiously at Johnny's room to deliver him his share from the robbery's earnings, and begs for Johnny's help in another robbery which he desperately needs to pay his debts, which Johnny refuses.

The following day, Caine Sr. is giving a kung fu class and invites Johnny to do a demonstration. Johnny angrily attacks his father, who defeats him in front of all the students. That night, in an attempt to connect with his son, Caine Sr. takes him on a visit to a ghost town, where their ancestor Kwai Chang Caine (the main character from the original series) lived. They talk about how Kwai Chang arrived there, became the respected "wise man of the town". When they are leaving, Johnny looks back and sees the ghostly figure of Kwai Chang at his house's door. However, as soon as they return home, Johnny phones Mic secretly and accepts to participate in the next robbery, except that this time he wants to be a partner instead of just getting a share of the earnings.

The robbery happens to be the decoupling of a train wagon. To his dismay, Johnny finds out that they are stealing guns. The thieves escape unnoticed. When Johnny wakes up the next day, very late, his father announces he will be out for the day, helping someone. Johnny uses the opportunity to reunite with Mic and go to see the crime boss (Barto) for whom they work, to propose to him becoming partners. At the warehouse where all the stolen goods are stored, the boss suspects Johnny is a traitor. They search him and find out that he is carrying a tape recorder. The criminals are about to execute Johnny when Caine Sr. appears. A fight ensues, in which the Caines overcome the criminals. Afterward, while the police are taking everybody in custody, Caine Sr. welcomes Johnny in the "family business", and Lt. Poole announces that the charges against Johnny will be reduced, and maybe dropped.

== Cast ==
- David Darlow as Kwai Chang Caine
- Brandon Lee as Kwai Chang "Johnny" Caine
- Miguel Ferrer as Mic
- Paula Kelly as Lt. Lois S. Poole
- Dominic Barto as Carl Levin

== Reception ==
Faye Zuckerman of El Paso Times criticized the pilot for its acting and screenplay, noting that "the hour-long show is just plain boring." Meanwhile, David Bianculli of The Philadelphia Inquirer wrote that the series "isn't even a near-miss".
