= CBS Summer Playhouse =

American anthology television series

- Opening title
- Genre: Anthology
- Directed by: Paul Bogart; James Burrows; Martha Coolidge; Joseph Sargent; Luis Valdez
- Presented by: Daphne Maxwell Reid (1987); Tim Reid (1987)
- Country of origin: United States
- Original language: English
- No. of seasons: 3
- No. of episodes: 46

Production
- Camera setup: Single-camera
- Running time: 45–48 minutes

Original release
- Network: CBS
- Release: June 12, 1987 – August 22, 1989

CBS Summer Playhouse is an American anthology series that ran from June 12, 1987, to August 22, 1989, on CBS. It aired unsold television pilots during the summer season.

== Overview ==
Tim Reid and Daphne Maxwell Reid acted as hosts during the first season, introducing each pilot. Viewers were also encouraged to call a 1-800 number at the end of each episode, to voice their preference. However, the "winning" pilot chosen by the viewers was never picked up as a series.

The series was revamped during the second and third seasons, and featured no hosts or viewer voting.

== Reception ==
David Bianculli of The Philadelphia Inquirer criticized the anthology series, writing that it "may be the most inaccurate title ever given to a TV program". Bianculli cited two aspects, that the show premiered just before summer began in 1987 and that none of the episodes originated from theatrical playhouses.

== Episodes ==
=== Series overview ===
Season	Episodes	Originally released	
Season	Episodes	First released	Last released
1	19	June 12, 1987	September 18, 1987
2	18	June 21, 1988	September 6, 1988
3	10	June 20, 1989	August 22, 1989

=== Season 1 (1987) ===
No. overall	No. in season	Title	Original release date	Rating/share (households)
1	1	"The Saint in Manhattan"	June 12, 1987	7.4/16
In this revival of The Saint, Andrew Clarke starred as Simon Templar. His restlessness upon returning to New York is relieved and his interest is aroused after receiving a note from an old flame. She's Margot (Liliana Komorowska), a ballerina performing at Lincoln Center who's being threatened.
2	2	"Kung Fu: The Next Generation"	June 19, 1987	8.6/18
A modern-day descendant of Caine (David Darlow) hopes to turn his estranged son (Brandon Lee) away from a life of crime in this revival of Kung Fu.
3	3	"Changing Patterns"	June 26, 1987	7.8/17
Two housewives trying to enter the fashion industry (Valerie Perrine and Brenda Vaccaro) can't find a store willing to buy their designs.
4	4	"Mickey and Nora"	June 26, 1987	7.8/17
An ex-CIA agent (Ted Wass) can't convince anyone that he's no longer a spy. Co-starring Barbara Treutelaar as Nora.
5	5	"Puppetman"	July 3, 1987	5.2/12
A children's show puppeteer (Fred Newman) is torn between spending time with his visiting 5-year-old son and saving his show in this Muppet sitcom from Jim Henson.
6	6	"Sawdust"	July 3, 1987	5.2/12
A bored accountant (James Eckhouse) buys a run-down circus and has a go at running it himself, much to the displeasure of his wife and children.
7	7	"Barrington"	July 9, 1987	7.9/18
A small-town New England police chief (Matt Salinger) is assigned to keep his eye on a government-protected witness (Robert Beltran) whose cover may have been blown.
8	8	"Doctors Wilde"	July 17, 1987	7.4/17
Life's a zoo for husband-and-wife veterinarians (Joseph Bottoms and Jennifer Hetrick) who treat wild animals in their home.
9	9	"Mabel and Max"	July 31, 1987	7.9/18
New York actress Mabel (Geraldine Fitzgerald), who has not worked since a heart attack, opens her home to an aspiring young actress (Mary B. Ward) and becomes her acting coach.
10	10	"King of the Building"	July 31, 1987	7.9/18
A doorman on Park Avenue (Richard Lewis) gets involved in the lives of his tenants.
11	11	"The Time of Their Lives"	August 7, 1987	8.2/18
A recent widower (James Widdoes) asks his ex-vaudevillian father (Buddy Ebsen) to help him raise his four daughters.
12	12	"Infiltrator"	August 14, 1987	7.0/15
A scientist (Scott Bakula) experimenting with teleporter technology manages to merge himself with an experimental probe that is designed to adapt automatically to any threat. The scientist is then recruited by a secret government agency to go on missions. As the probe technology adapts itself to higher and higher threat levels, the scientist becomes less and less human.
13	13	"Reno and Yolanda"	August 28, 1987	7.1/14
Comedy about a ballroom-dancing couple (Louis Giambalvo and Suzie Plakson) who teach in an Atlantic City hotel.
14	14	"Day to Day"	August 28, 1987	7.1/14
While planning their parents' anniversary party, three sisters (Linda Purl, Deborah Harmon and Noelle Parker) catch up on their lives.
15	15	"Sirens"	September 4, 1987	7.8/17
Comedy about two female police officers (Dinah Manoff and Loretta Devine).
16	16	"In the Lion's Den"	September 4, 1987	7.8/17
A former game-show producer (Wendy Crewson) finds herself producing a kiddie puppet show. Directed by James Burrows.
17	17	"Travelin' Man"	September 11, 1987	5.5/11
A burned-out Boston surgeon (James Naughton) decides to hit the road and reconnect with his father (Richard Farnsworth) and daughter, both of whom from he has been estranged.
18	18	"Kingpins"	September 18, 1987	5.4/10
A father (Dorian Harewood) and daughter (Marie-Alise Recasner) run a bowling alley.
19	19	"Sons of Gunz"	September 18, 1987	5.4/10
Comedy about a New Jersey auto dealer (Kenneth McMillan) and his four sons. Actor Robert Firth portrayed his philandering son Charley.

=== Season 2 (1988) ===
No. overall	No. in season	Title	Original release date	U.S. viewers (millions)	Rating/share (households)
20	1	"My Africa"	June 21, 1988	N/A	7.9/15
In 1952, a divorced doctor (Carl Weintraub) brings his children to live with him in Africa after their mother's death.
21	2	"Real Life"	June 28, 1988	N/A	5.7/11
Charlotte Brown's comedy about homemaking from the viewpoints of a blue-collar worker's wife and an ex-career woman.
22	3	"Old Money"	June 28, 1988	N/A	5.7/11
Comedy about a fabulously wealthy family, and the servants who work for them. Cast includes John Dye, Conchata Ferrell and Lori Loughlin.
23	4	"The Pretenders"	July 5, 1988	N/A	6.4/12
An FBI agent (Amanda Pays) finds herself teamed up with the twin brother of her former partner and boyfriend to solve his murder.
24	5	"Baby on Board"	July 12, 1988	N/A	7.5/14
A successful career couple in their forties (Lawrence Pressman and Jane Galloway) adjusts to the pressures of a new baby. Directed by David Steinberg.
25	6	"Dr. Paradise"	July 12, 1988	N/A	7.5/14
Comedy about a health resort located on a small tropical island, and the staff that works there. Cast includes Frank Langella and Sally Kellerman.
26	7	"The Johnsons Are Home"	July 19, 1988	N/A	5.0/10
Off the wall family finds their version of domestic bliss in Minneapolis.
27	8	"Limited Partners"	July 19, 1988	N/A	5.0/10
Two pals (Joe Flaherty and Kevin Meaney) try to get rich quick by buying a busted burger joint, and serving only British fast food.
28	9	"Silent Whisper"	July 26, 1988	8.0	6.5/12
A San Francisco police detective is rendered voiceless and vows revenge when his family is murdered by a serial killer.
29	10	"Fort Figueroa"	August 2, 1988	8.2	6.4/12
A farming family from the mid-west inherits an apartment building in East LA. Cast includes Charles Haid.
30	11	"Whattley by the Bay"	August 9, 1988	8.5	6.4/13
A big-city newspaper editor decides to return home to the town where he grew up.
31	12	"Sniff"	August 9, 1988	8.5	6.4/13
An unsuccessful reporter (Robert Wuhl) finds his luck changing when he becomes the owner of a talented dog.
32	13	"Off Duty"	August 16, 1988	6.9	5.0/10
Comedy set in a bar frequented by cops and ex-cops. Cast includes Eileen Brennan, Taurean Blacque, Tony Lo Bianco and Lisa Blount.
33	14	"Roughhouse"	August 16, 1988	6.9	5.0/10
Two would-be carpenters try to finish a custom house by morning.
34	15	"Mad Avenue"	August 23, 1988	7.9	5.6/11
Drama about the 'frantic professional and personal' lives of the staff at a national advertising agency.
35	16	"Further Adventures"	August 30, 1988	8.3	5.6/10
Two photographers (David Bowe and John Scott Clough) accompany a Princess (Ada Maris) around the world in search of her missing parents.
36	17	"Tickets, Please"	September 6, 1988	4.3	3.5/6
A sitcom focusing on patrons of a bar car on one of New York City's commuter railways. Cast includes Cleavon Little, Bill Macy, Marcia Strassman and Harold Gould. Shown as one of the last features on CBS Summer Playhouse.
37	18	"Some Kinda Woman"	September 6, 1988	4.3	3.5/6
Opposites Attract as a free-spirited woman meets a conservative stockbroker. Directed by Bill Bixby, cast includes Morgan Fairchild and Hunt Block.

=== Season 3 (1989) ===
No. overall	No. in season	Title	Original release date	U.S. viewers (millions)
38	1	"Microcops"	June 20, 1989	7.4
Two intergalactic 'Microcops' chase a cosmic crook named Cloyd (Page Mosely) to Earth, where their size becomes cellular.
39	2	"B-Men"	June 27, 1989	7.5
The "B Men" are high-schoolers who take up bounty hunting after "relying on their wits" to nab a serial killer.
40	3	"Coming to America"	July 4, 1989	5.2
Based on the film of the same name, this pilot places Prince Tariq of Zamunda (Tommy Davidson) and his assistant Oha (Paul Bates) in the house of a family in Queens, New York.
41	4	"Shivers"	July 4, 1989	5.2
A divorced father (Mark Lindsay Chapman) and his children move into a house haunted by a Revolutionary War-era troublemaker and his girlfriend.
42	5	"Elysian Fields"	July 11, 1989	7.9
Nate Goodman (Jeffrey DeMunn) moves to New Orleans and into a boardinghouse filled with eccentrics, led by the divorced proprietor and her lustful sister.
43	6	"American Nuclear"	July 25, 1989	5.4
A New York columnist (James Farentino) and a mayoral aide marry and create a blended family with his rebellious daughter and her uptight children.
44	7	"Curse of the Corn People"	August 1, 1989	8.0
In Kansas, a group of friends in their 20s undertakes the making of a horror movie called "Curse of the Corn People" about a feminist zombie who stalks farmers, but things don't go as planned. Cast includes John Terlesky, Danielle von Zerneck and Catherine Keener.
45	8	"The Heat"	August 8, 1989	8.7
Five Federal marshals are out to burn a maniacal bandit and his cohorts who have stolen three truckloads of Stinger missiles.
46	9	"Road Show"	August 15, 1989	8.1
A Philadelphia restaurant critic becomes intrigued by the big-city antics and small-town charms of an enigmatic traveler, and joins him on his journeys. Cast includes Lee Majors, Celeste Holm, Ellen Greene and Dub Taylor.
47	10	"Outpost"	August 22, 1989	9.2
Rachel Morgan (Joanna Going) is the marshal of a sleepy human "Outpost" on the planet Icarus, where a vicious alien leads a group of native Icari on the warpath.
