= Laser Mission =

1989 film by BJ Davis

- Directed by: Beau Davis
- Screenplay by: Phillip Guteridge
- Story by: David A. Frank
- Produced by: Claus Czaika
- Starring: Brandon Lee; Ernest Borgnine; Debi Monahan; Werner Pochath
- Cinematography: Hans Kuhle Jr.
- Edited by: E. Selave
- Music by: David Knopfler
- Production companies: Zimuth-INterfilm; IMV Vertrieb Intl.; Medien & Karat Film Intl.
- Release date: November 1989 (West Germany)
- Running time: 84 minutes
- Country: West Germany
- Language: English

Laser Mission, also known as Soldier of Fortune, is a West German action film directed by Beau J. Davis, and starring Brandon Lee, Ernest Borgnine, and Werner Pochath in his final film role.

The film follows a rebellious government agent on a desperate mission to destroy a top-secret laser weapons operation in a Soviet-controlled African nation.

== Plot ==
Michael Gold (Lee) is a mercenary who is sent to convince Professor Braun (Borgnine), a laser specialist, to defect to the United States before the KGB acquire him, and use both his talent and a stolen diamond to create a nuclear weapon. Braun is captured by the KGB and Gold sets out to retrieve them. He has to enlist the help of Dr. Braun's daughter Alissa (Debi A. Monahan), whom he eventually falls for. The pair confront Colonel Kalishnakov (Graham Clarkúe), whom they kill by hitting him with a truck.

== Cast ==
- Brandon Lee as Michael Gold
- Debi A. Monahan as Alissa
- Ernest Borgnine as Professor Braun
- Graham Clark as Colonel Kalishnakov
- Trevor Williamson as The Foot

== Production ==
The film was a co-production between West Germany, South Africa, and the United States. The movie was filmed primarily in South Africa and Namibia. The screenplay was written by Phillip Gutteridge from a story by David A. Frank, crafting a straightforward action narrative centered on Cold War espionage involving a kidnapped laser expert and a stolen diamond. The film's music was composed by David Knopfler, co-founder of Dire Straits. He has one straight-ahead rocker that is played during the opening credits, closing credits, and several times in between, playing six times in the film. It was Brandon Lee's first major English-language leading role following his debut in the 1986 Hong Kong film Legacy of Rage. The budget was so small that the filmmakers had to re-use extras repeatedly and, despite the title of the film, there are no lasers featured in the movie.

== Release ==
In the United States the film was released on home video in 1990 by Turner Home Entertainment.

The film was released in Australia directly on video in 1994.

The film eventually became a staple of budget DVD multi-packs, particularly the ones manufactured by Mill Creek.

== Box office ==
In the US the film was a financial success.

After Brandon Lee's untimely death in an accident on the set of The Crow, movies such as Laser Mission saw a surge in video sales.

== Reception and legacy ==
From contemporary reviews, Variety described the film as a "lively, well-made actioner with humor" that had both Brandon Lee and Debi Monahan left to "struggle with a mediocre script." Jon Casimir of The Sydney Morning Herald did not like the film, finding the acting poor, with the plot and action scenes unconvincing. Pat Gillespie of The Age found the direction clumsy but said that Lee's and action film fans would find the film entertaining.

From retrospective reviews, Jim Vorel and Kenneth Lowe of Paste Magazine did not like it and found the continuity disorienting. Dan Colón of Talk Film Society said the film is great for those with an appetite for action-oriented B movies.

RiffTrax spoofed the film on October 3, 2011.
