= Brandon Lee =

American actor and martial artist (1965–1993)

- 李國豪
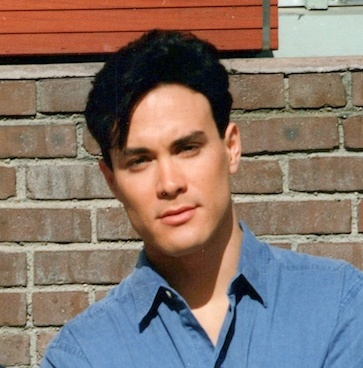
- Lee on the set of Showdown in Little Tokyo, 1991
- Born: Brandon Bruce Lee; February 1, 1965; Oakland, California, U.S.
- Died: March 31, 1993 (aged 28); Wilmington, North Carolina, U.S.
- Burial place: Lake View Cemetery, Seattle, Washington, U.S.
- Education: Lee Strasberg Theatre and Film Institute, Emerson College
- Occupations: Actor; martial artist; fight choreographer
- Years active: 1985–1993
- Partner(s): Eliza Hutton (1990–1993; his death)
- Parents: Bruce Lee (father); Linda Lee Cadwell (mother)
- Relatives: Lee Hoi-chuen (grandfather); Grace Ho (grandmother); Peter Lee Jung-sum (uncle); Robert Lee Jun-fai (uncle); Shannon Lee (sister)

Chinese name
- Traditional Chinese: 李國豪
- Simplified Chinese: 李国豪
Transcriptions
Standard Mandarin
- Hanyu Pinyin: Lǐ Guóháo
Yue: Cantonese
- Jyutping: Lei Gwok-hou

Brandon Bruce Lee (February 1, 1965 – March 31, 1993) was an American actor and martial artist. Establishing himself as a rising action star in the early 1990s, Lee landed what was to be his breakthrough role as Eric Draven in the supernatural superhero film The Crow (1994). However, Lee's career and life were cut short by his accidental death during the film's production.

Lee was the son of martial artist and film star Bruce Lee, who died when Brandon was eight years old. Lee, who followed in his father's footsteps, trained in martial arts, including Jeet Kune Do, Wing Chun, Eskrima, Silat, and Muay Thai, and studied acting at Emerson College and the Lee Strasberg Theatre and Film Institute. Lee started his career with leading roles in the Hong Kong action film Legacy of Rage (1986), and the straight-to-video Laser Mission (1989), which was a financial success on home video. Lee also appeared in two spin-offs of the 1970s series Kung Fu, the television film Kung Fu: The Movie (1986) and the pilot Kung Fu: The Next Generation (1987).

Transitioning to Hollywood productions, Lee first starred in the Warner Bros buddy cop film Showdown in Little Tokyo (1991), co-starring Dolph Lundgren. While it did not do well with audiences and critics upon its release, it later became a cult film. This was followed by a leading role in Rapid Fire (1992), produced by 20th Century Fox. Lee, alongside Jeff Imada, is also credited for the fight choreography, which contained elements of Jeet Kune Do. Though the film was not well received, critics praised Lee's onscreen presence.

After being cast to headline The Crow, Lee had filmed nearly all of his scenes when he was fatally wounded on set by a prop gun. Lee posthumously received praise for his performance, while the film became a critical and commercial success. His career has drawn parallels with his father's, both men having died young prior to the release of their breakthrough films.

== Early life ==
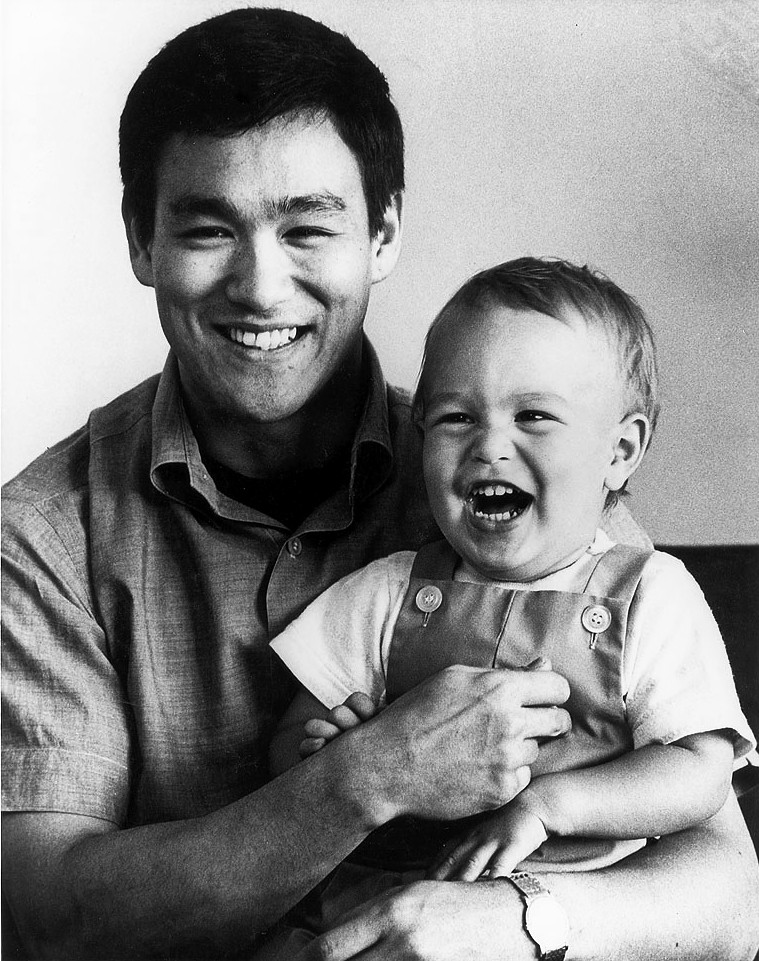
Lee and his father around 1966

Brandon was born on February 1, 1965, at East Oakland Hospital in Oakland, California, the son of martial artist and actor Bruce Lee (1940–1973) and Linda Lee Cadwell (née Emery). From a young age, Lee learned martial arts from his father, who was a well-known practitioner and a martial arts movie star. Lee said the family lived between Hong Kong and the United States, due to his father's career. While visiting his father's sets, Lee became interested in acting. Lee's father died suddenly in 1973, leaving a legacy that made him an icon of martial arts and cinema. Grace Ho (Lee's grandmother) said that by the age of 5, he could kick through an inch board.

Afterwards, Lee's family moved back to California. Lee began studying with Dan Inosanto, one of his father's students, when he was nine. Later in his youth, Lee also trained with Richard Bustillo and Jeff Imada. Imada said that when Lee was in his teens, he struggled with his identity, and having to train in dojos which included large photos of his father troubled him. According to Imada, this led Lee to leave martial arts in favor of soccer. Both would reconnect later in their film careers, with Imada working as stunt and fight coordinator in several of Lee's upcoming films. Meanwhile, Lee was a rebellious high school student. In 1983, four months prior to his graduation, Lee was asked to leave the Chadwick School for misbehavior. That year Lee received his GED from Miraleste High School.

Lee pursued his studies in New York City, where he took acting lessons at the Lee Strasberg Theatre and Film Institute. Lee went on to Emerson College in Boston, Massachusetts, where he majored in theater. During this time, Lee appeared in several stage productions. He was part of the Eric Morris American New Theatre, with them he appeared in John Lee Hancock's play Full Fed Beast.

== Career ==
=== 1985 to 1990: Early roles ===
Lee returned to Los Angeles in 1985 and worked as a script reader. During this period, he was approached by casting director Lynn Stalmaster and successfully auditioned for his first credited acting role in Kung Fu: The Movie. It was a feature-length television movie that was a follow-up to the 1970s television series Kung Fu, with David Carradine returning as the lead. On set Lee reconnected with his former instructor Jeff Imada who worked in the stunt department. Imada said Lee had to be talked into accepting the role, since the martial arts nature of the film did not appeal to Lee, who avoided any connection with his father's genre of film. In the film, the character of Kwai Chang Caine (Carradine) has a conflict with his illegitimate son (Lee). Kung Fu: The Movie first aired on ABC on February 1, 1986. Lee said that he felt there was some justice in being cast for this role in his first feature, since the TV show's pilot had been conceived for his father.

That year saw the release of Ronny Yu's Hong Kong action crime thriller Legacy of Rage. This was Lee's first leading film role. Yu said that Lee and him did not get along during shooting. In the film, Lee plays a young man blamed for a crime he did not commit. It was the only film Lee made in Hong Kong, and in Cantonese. Lee was nominated for a Hong Kong Film Award for Best New Performer in this role. The film was a critical success at the 1987 Cannes Film Festival, and was a commercial success in Japan.

In 1987, Lee starred in another spin-off of Kung Fu, the unsold television pilot Kung Fu: The Next Generation. On June 19, it aired on CBS Summer Playhouse, a program that specialized in rejected pilots and allowed the audience to call in to vote for a show to be picked up as a series. The plot centered on the grandson and great-grandson (Lee) of the main character from the original series. The pilot was poorly received and not picked up as a series.

In 1988, Lee had a role in "What's In a Name", an episode of the American television series Ohara, starring Pat Morita, He portrayed the main villain, the son of a yakuza. Jeff Imada, who worked as stunt coordinator, said that Lee was recommended not to do the role due to the nature of the character. However, Lee saw it as a chance to expand his acting range, and took the role.

In 1990, Laser Mission was released. Filmed in Namibia, Lee stars as mercenary on a mission. Distributed by Turner Home Entertainment, it was a commercial success on home video. The film was generally panned by critics, although a few considered it an amusing action B movie.

In the 1980s, Lee started to train again with Dan Inosanto. Inosanto said that Lee would bring a camera to the training facilities to see which techniques looked good on screen. Also around this time, Margaret Loesch, Marvel's CEO from 1984 to 1990, had a meeting with Lee and his mother through comic book writer Stan Lee (no relation). Stan Lee felt that Brandon would be ideal in the role of super-hero Shang-Chi in a film or television adaptation.

=== 1991 to 1993: Hollywood breakthrough ===
In April 1991, Lee was in Universal Pictures' list of contenders to play his father in the biopic Dragon: The Bruce Lee Story (1993). He turned the role down, finding it awkward to play his father, and too strange to approach the romance between his parents. Also, producer Raffaella De Laurentiis said he did not look Chinese enough and that she would have refused to work on the project if they had to resort to making Brandon appear more Asian. The role went to Jason Scott Lee (no relation), who said he was initially intimidated by his role as Bruce Lee but that he overcame his fear after speaking to Brandon. According to Jason, Brandon told him the following in regards to the role: "He said I wouldn't survive in this part if I treated his father like a god. He said his father was, after all, a man who had a profound destiny, but he was not a god. He was a man who had a temper, a lot of anger, who found mediocrity offensive. Sometimes he was rather merciless." Director Rob Cohen said he spent hours talking to Brandon during preparations.

On August 23, 1991, Mark L. Lester's Showdown in Little Tokyo premiered, which Warner Bros. produced and distributed. Lee starred opposite Dolph Lundgren in the buddy cop action film. Lee secured his role on October 13, 1990, to make his American feature debut. It was meant to start shooting after his casting but was delayed until the following January. In the film, Lee and Lundgren play cops who are partnered to investigate yakuza. In the US, the domestic gross was $2,275,557. The movie faced largely negative reviews; retrospectively, however, some critics find it entertaining for its genre.

While visiting Sweden, Lee was among the cameos in the locally made genre film Sex, Lögner och Videovåld (2002), filmed between 1990 and 1993. The film was completed in 2000.

Lee's next film was 20th Century Fox's Rapid Fire, which premiered on August 22, 1992, and was directed by Dwight H. Little. Despite Showdown in Little Tokyo's poor box office, Fox liked Lee's performance and thought that he could be a Steven Seagal or Chuck Norris-like action star for the studio. Lee plays a student named Jake Lo who witnesses a murder and is put in a witness protection program. The film came about when producer Robert Lawrence started working with Lee and noticed his potential to be an action leading man in Hollywood after screening Lee's earlier project Legacy of Rage. Lee was involved with the story development, and connected with the plot point where his character loses his father. Jeff Imada, the film's stunt coordinator, witnessed Lee bringing a book of work by his father to emotionally prepare himself in the scene where the character loses his dad. Imada also said Lee put on muscle for the role. Lee and Imada are credited for the fight choreography, the fighting style contain elements of Lee father's Jeet Kune Do. Lee was allowed to add some touches of his own humor to the script. On playing the character of Jake Lo, Lee said "I always saw that character as not being gung-ho to get himself involved in those situations. I wanted to keep that throughout the film, that sarcastic edge. So he's not just becoming Joe Action Hero." In the US, the film is debuted at No.3 at the box office, making $4,815,850. After its 19 weeks run in cinemas, it made a total of $14,356,479. Most critics did not like the film, but many of them found Lee charismatic. A minority of critics found Rapid Fire to be slick, well acted, and a serviceable action film. Also that year, it was reported that Lee signed a three-picture deal with Fox and a multi-picture deal with Carolco Pictures. That year, according to John Lee Hancock, Lee read the first draft of The Little Things (2021), and was interested to act in it.

Aware that being Bruce Lee's son helped his marketability, Lee hoped to use action movies to become a mainstream star like Johnny Depp. In the fall, while doing publicity for Rapid Fire, Lee landed the lead role in Alex Proyas' The Crow, an adaptation of a comic book by the same name. It tells the story of Eric Draven (Lee), a rock musician raised from the dead by a supernatural crow to avenge his own death as well as the rape and murder of his fiancée by a dangerous gang in his city. According to producer Jeff Most, Lee had good insight on the character and liked the lyrical lines within the script, but did not want the dialogue to spread aimlessly. Hence, Lee focused on the brevity and rhythm of the lines of dialogue to make the character threatening. In preparation for the fight sequence, Most said that director Proyas and Lee studied martial arts movies. Also according to Most, Lee did not want metaphysical characters besides his own in the film. Costumer Roberta Bile said that Lee modelled Draven after singer Chris Robinson. Lee convinced the team to hire Jeff Imada who became the stunt coordinator; he and Imada oversaw the fight choreography.

Imada and Lee agreed that the character of Eric Draven would not do conventional martial arts moves; his movements would be unique. He is a character without formal martial arts training who was given supernatural abilities upon resurrection. With this in mind, they added aerobics to Draven's fighting style. Both Imada and Most said Lee was pleased to incorporate his martial arts to the design of the character, without it being part of the story. Imada said that in order to look like a rocker and not an action hero, Lee went on a strict diet weeks before shooting in order to remove a lot of bulk, and would even weigh the food he ate. Lee also focused on cardiovascular exercise with a stairmaster, did repetitions on lighter weights to elongate and stretch his muscles, and did aerobics to lose body fat rapidly. During pre-production, Imada said that in order to get into character for the resurrection, Lee bought bags of ice in which he submerged himself, because Lee hypothesized that the feeling of resurrection must be freezing cold. The resurrection scene was shot the first night of production, during the winter. Imada was surprised that Lee requested the bags of ice because of the weather, and the fact that he was already barefoot and bare-naked. Key hairstylist Michelle Johnson said that in rain scenes Lee would soak himself prior to filming the scenes, where he would act without a shirt in cold weather. The film crew was impressed with his performance and dedication.

== Death ==
On March 31, 1993, Lee was filming a scene for the film The Crow in which his character is shot and killed by thugs. In the scene, Lee's character walks into his apartment and discovers his fiancée being beaten and raped, and a thug played by actor Michael Massee fires a Smith & Wesson Model 629 .44 Magnum revolver at Lee's character as he walks into the room.

In a film shoot prior to the fatal scene, the gun that was used as a prop (a real revolver) was loaded with improperly made dummy rounds. These were improvised from live cartridges that had the powder charges removed by the special effects crew, so in close-ups the revolver would show normal-looking ammunition. Critically, the primers were not removed from the rounds because they were initially improvising blank rounds. To create dummy rounds, they discharged some of their improvised blank rounds and reinserted bullets into the spent casings. At least one of these improvised dummy rounds had an intact primer, which had sufficient power to lodge the bullet in the barrel when fired. Initial police investigations found that one of the dummy rounds was missing its bullet.

During the fatal scene, which called for the revolver to be fired at Lee from a distance of 3.6–4.5 meters (12–15 ft), the dummy cartridges were replaced with blank rounds, which contained a powder charge and the primer, but no solid bullet, allowing the gun to be fired with sound and flash effects without the risk of an actual projectile. However, the gun was not properly checked and cleared before the blank was fired, while a bullet from one of the improvised dummy rounds was still lodged in the barrel – resulting in a condition known as a squib load. That bullet was then propelled forward by the blank's propellant and shot out the muzzle with almost the same force as if the round were live, striking Lee in the abdomen at lethal velocity.

After Massee pulled the trigger and shot Lee, Lee fell backwards instead of forwards as he was supposed to. When the director said "cut", Lee did not stand up and the crew thought he was either still acting or joking. Jeff Imada, who immediately checked Lee, noticed something wrong when he came close and noted Lee was unconscious and breathing heavily. Medic Clyde Baisey went to Lee and shook him to see if he was dazed by hitting his head during the fall, but did not think Lee had been shot since there was no visible bleeding. Baisey took Lee's pulse, which was regular, but within two to three minutes it slowed down dramatically, and stopped.

Lee was rushed to the New Hanover Regional Medical Center in Wilmington, North Carolina. Attempts to save him were unsuccessful and after six hours of emergency surgery, Lee was pronounced dead on March 31, 1993, at 1:03 pm. He was 28 years old. The shooting was ruled an accident due to negligence. Lee's death led to the re-emergence of conspiracy theories surrounding his father's similarly early death. Lee was buried next to his father at the Lake View Cemetery in Seattle, Washington. A private funeral attended by 50 took place in Seattle on April 3. The following day, 200 of Lee's family and business associates attended a memorial service at actress Polly Bergen's house in Los Angeles. Among the attendees were Kiefer Sutherland, Lou Diamond Phillips, David Hasselhoff, Steven Seagal, David Carradine, and Melissa Etheridge.

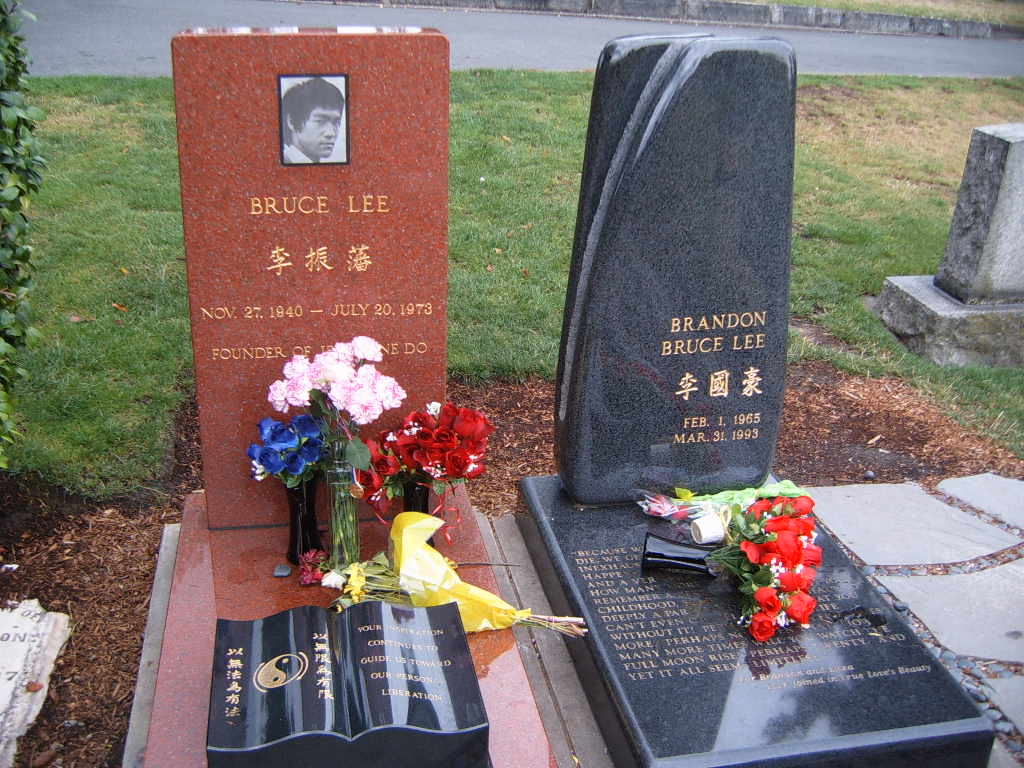
The graves of Bruce and Brandon Lee

In August 1993, Lee's mother, Linda Lee Cadwell, filed a lawsuit against the filmmakers alleging negligence in the death of her son. The suit was settled two months later under undisclosed terms.

In an interview just prior to his death, Lee quoted a passage from Paul Bowles' book The Sheltering Sky which he had chosen for his wedding invitations; it is now inscribed on his tombstone:

Because we don't know when we will die, we get to think of life as an inexhaustible well. And yet everything happens only a certain number of times, and a very small number really. How many more times will you remember a certain afternoon of your childhood, an afternoon that is so deeply a part of your being that you can't even conceive of your life without it? Perhaps four, or five times more? Perhaps not even that. How many more times will you watch the full moon rise? Perhaps twenty. And yet it all seems limitless...

== Legacy ==
After Lee's death in 1993, his fiancée Eliza Hutton and his mother supported director Proyas' decision to complete The Crow. At the time of Lee's death, only eight days were left before completion of the movie. A majority of the film had already been completed with Lee, and he was only required to shoot scenes for three more days. To complete the film, stunt doubles Chad Stahelski and Jeff Cadiente served as stand-ins; special effects were used to give them Lee's face. Lee's on-set death paved the way for deceased actors to complete or have new performances, since pioneering CGI techniques were used to complete The Crow. A month later, it was reported that Lee's previous films Laser Mission, Showdown in Little Tokyo, and Rapid Fire saw a surge in video sales. On April 28, Dragon: The Bruce Lee Story premiered at the Mann's Chinese Theatre in Hollywood. The film is dedicated to Brandon with the quote: "The key to immortality is first living a life worth remembering." The event was considered a celebration of both Brandon and his father Bruce. Brandon's mother Linda and sister Shannon attended the premiere. Linda found the film to be excellent and a great tribute to her whole family.

In 1994, The Crow opened at number one in the United States in 1,573 theaters grossing $11.7 million, averaging $7,485 per theater. The film ultimately grossed $50.7 million, above its $23 million budget, 24th among all films released in the U.S. that year and 10th among R-rated films released that year. It was the most successful film of Lee's career, and is considered a cult classic. The film is dedicated to him and his fiancée Eliza Hutton. The Crow has an approval rating of 87 percent on Rotten Tomatoes based on 75 reviews; critical consensus there is: "Filled with style and dark, lurid energy, The Crow is an action-packed visual feast that also has a soul in the performance of the late Brandon Lee." The Crow has a score of 71 out of 100 on Metacritic based on 14 critics, indicating "Generally favorable reviews". Reviewers praised the action and visual style. Rolling Stone called it a "dazzling fever dream of a movie"; Caryn James, writing for The New York Times, called it "a genre film of a high order, stylish and smooth"; Roger Ebert called it "a stunning work of visual style". The Los Angeles Times also praised the film. Lee's death was alleged to have a melancholic effect on viewers; Desson Howe of The Washington Post wrote that Lee "haunts every frame" and James Berardinelli called the film "a case of 'art imitating death', and that specter will always hang over The Crow".

Jessica Seigel of the Chicago Tribune found that Lee never quite left the shadow of his father and that The Crow did not live up to Lee's full unexploited potential. Amber McKee of the Park Record considered it a good film but an eerie conclusion to Lee's career, since he had wanted to escape the action genre and move on to dramatic roles. Berardinelli called it an appropriate epitaph to Lee, Howe called it an appropriate sendoff, and Ebert stated that not only was this Lee's best film, it was also better than any of his father's. The Crow retained a loyal following many years after its release. Due to the source material and Lee's fate, it is often described as a goth cult film.

In 1998, Legacy of Rage was released in the US to Home media, and Australia the next year. The film has been described as stylistic and fast-paced, with a good performance by Lee.

== Martial arts and philosophy ==
Lee was trained from a young age by his father Bruce Lee in martial arts. During this time, martial artist Bob Wall, a friend and collaborator of Bruce, observed that Lee hit with power and had good footwork. At age eight, after his father's death, Bruce's disciple Dan Inosanto trained Lee. According to Jeff Imada who at the time was helping with children's classes at Inosanto's Kali Institute, the fact that he was the son of one of its founders was kept quiet; Lee had difficulty focusing due to seeing his father's photos taking so much space in his studio. Imada said Lee stopped training in his mid-teens to play soccer. Richard Bustillo also trained Lee during his teens and said that Lee worked hard and was always respectful. Lee said that with his training Arnis with Inosanto he specialized in both Kali and Escrima and lasted three to four years.

In 1986, Lee said that he was training in Yee Chuan Tao, a relaxation-based martial art, with a trainer named Mike Vendrell. Lee said that it consisted of exercises such as slow sparring, Chi sao practice; they also worked on a wooden dummy, as well as Vendrell swinging a staff at him while he would duck or jump over. He said later that the exercise helped him be less tense.

Also in the 1980s, Lee returned to Dan Inosanto's Academy. Lee said he did a few amateur fights but did not seek to compete in tournaments. He would bring a camera to Inosanto's studio, both would choreograph fights for Lee's films and would allow him to see how various moves played out on screen. During this time, Lee also trained in weapon-based martial arts such as Eskrima and Silat. In 1991, Lee was certified by the Thai Boxing Association. While his main goal was dramatic acting, he credited his skill in martial arts to have helped him to get roles that require it.

During the filming of The Crow, Lee said he did cardiovascular exercises to the point of exhaustion using a jump rope, running, riding a LifeCycle, or using a StairMaster, after which he would train at Inosanto's academy where he took Muay Thai classes.

According to Lee's mother, years prior to his death Lee became consumed with his father's written philosophy, taking lengthy notes. When asked which martial arts he practiced, he responded:

When people ask me that question, I usually say that my father created the art of Jeet Kune Do and I have been trained in that. However, that's a little too simple to say because Jeet Kune Do was my father's very personal expression of the martial arts. So I always feel a little bit silly saying I practice Jeet Kune Do, although I certainly have been trained in it. It would be more accurate to say that I practice my own interpretation of Jeet Kune Do, just as everyone who practices Jeet Kune Do does.

In August 1992, Bruce Lee biographer John Little asked Brandon Lee what his philosophy in life was, and he replied, "Eat—or die!" Brandon later spoke of the martial arts and self-knowledge:

Well, I would say this: when you move down the road towards mastery of the martial arts—and you know, you are constantly moving down that road—you end up coming up against these barriers inside yourself that will attempt to stop you from continuing to pursue the mastery of the martial arts. And these barriers are such things as when you come up against your own limitations, when you come up against the limitations of your will, your ability, your natural ability, your courage, how you deal with success—and failure as well, for that matter. And as you overcome each one of these barriers, you end up learning something about yourself. And sometimes, the things you learn about yourself can, to the individual, seem to convey a certain spiritual sense along with them.

...It's funny, every time you come up against a true barrier to your progress, you are a child again. And it's a very interesting experience to be reduced, once again, to the level of knowing nothing about what you're doing. I think there's a lot of room for learning and growth when that happens—if you face it head-on and don't choose to say, "Ah, screw that! I'm going to do something else!"

We reduce ourselves at a certain point in our lives to kind of solely pursuing things that we already know how to do. You know, because you don't want to have that experience of not knowing what you're doing and being an amateur again. And I think that's rather unfortunate. It's so much more interesting and usually illuminating to put yourself in a situation where you don't know what's going to happen, than to do something again that you already know essentially what the outcome will be within three or four points either way.

== Personal life ==
Lee's paternal great-grandfather was Ho Kom-Tong, a Chinese philanthropist who was the half-brother of businessman and philanthropist Sir Robert Ho Tung. Lee's mother, Linda Emery, has Swedish and German ancestry. Lee's father has been said to have "proudly told everyone" about his newborn son Brandon's diverse features, describing him as perhaps the only Chinese person with blond hair and grey eyes. He was the brother of Shannon Lee.

According to Chuck Norris, a friend and collaborator of Lee's father, he lived not far from their home in California and spent time with him as a child telling him about his father. Norris also explained that his son, Eric Norris, and Lee were childhood friends. John Lee Hancock said he had a friendship with Lee, who would read all of his scripts. Lee was also friends with George Clooney and Miguel Ferrer. Clooney stated, "my cousin Miguel Ferrer was gonna be his best man the next week at their wedding. Brandon and I played ball and hung out at the Hollywood YMCA three days a week, we were buddies and this was his big break." Lee was also a friend of Chad Stahelski, his double after his death during The Crow. The two trained together at the Inosanto Martial Arts Academy.

In 1990, Lee met Eliza Hutton at director Renny Harlin's office, where she was working as his personal assistant. Lee and Hutton moved in together in early 1991 and became engaged in October 1992. They planned to get married in Ensenada, Mexico, on April 17, 1993, a week after Lee was to complete filming on The Crow.

== Filmography ==
Film
Year	Title	Role	Notes
1986	Legacy of Rage	Brandon Ma	Alternative title: Long Zai Jiang Hu, Dragon Blood.
1989	Laser Mission	Michael Gold	Alternative titles: Mercenary Man, Soldier of Fortune.
1991	Showdown in Little Tokyo	Johnny Murata	
1992	Rapid Fire	Jake Lo	Last of his films to be released during his lifetime.
1994	The Crow	Eric Draven / The Crow	Shot and killed as a result of negligence during filming. Special effects and a stand-in were used to complete Lee's remaining scenes. Released posthumously.
2000	Sex, Lögner och Videovåld	Man waiting in line at club	Alternative titles: Sex, Lies, & Video Violence. Swedish film released posthumously.

Television
Year	Title	Role	Notes
1986	Kung Fu: The Movie	Chung Wang	Television film
1987	Kung Fu: The Next Generation	Johnny Caine	Television pilot. Aired on CBS Summer Playhouse
1988	Ohara	Kenji	Episode: What's in a Name

== Awards and nominations ==
Award	Category	Nominated work	Result	Ref.
6th Hong Kong Film Awards	Best New Performer	Legacy of Rage (1986)	Nominated	
1995 Fangoria Chainsaw Awards	Best Actor	The Crow (1994)	Won	
2021 Asian Hall of Fame induction	Actor & Cultural Icon Award in memoriam	—N/a	Won	

== See also ==
- The Captive – 1915 film during which Charles Chandler was shot with a rifle
- Jon-Erik Hexum – actor killed by accidental self-inflicted blank cartridge gunshot to the head
- Halyna Hutchins – cinematographer and journalist shot and killed on the film set of Rust when a live round was loaded into a replica gun
- List of film and television accidents

== Works cited ==
- Jeffrey, Douglas (1993). "The Tragic death of Brandon Lee". Black Belt Magazine. Vol. 31, no. 7.
- Little, John (1993). "Brandon Lee's final martial arts interview". Black Belt Magazine. Vol. 31, no. 8.
- Allen, Terence (1994). "The movies of Brandon Lee". Black Belt Magazine. Vol. 32, no. 9.
- Coleman, Jim (1994). "Brandon Lee's first interview!". Black Belt Magazine. Vol. 32, no. 9.
- Little, John (1996). The Warrior Within: The philosophies of Bruce Lee to better understand the world around you and achieve a rewarding life. Contemporary Books. ISBN 0-8092-3194-8.
- Reid, Dr. Craig D. (1999). "Shannon Lee: Emerging From the Shadow of Bruce Lee". Black Belt Magazine. Vol. 37, no. 2.
- Baiss, Bridget (2004). The Crow: The Story Behind The Film. London: Titan Books. ISBN 978-1-84023-779-5, 978-1-78116-184-5
- Stevenson, Jack (2015). Scandinavian Blue: The Erotic Cinema of Sweden and Denmark in the 1960s and 1970s. London and North Carolina: McFarland. ISBN 978-1-4766-1259-1
- Crick, Robert Alan (2015). The Big Screen Comedies of Mel Brooks. London and North Carolina: McFarland. ISBN 978-1-4766-1228-7
