= List of Kung Fu episodes =

This is a list of episodes of the 1972–1975 American television series Kung Fu, starring David Carradine as Kwai Chang Caine.

== Series overview ==
Season	Episodes	Originally released	
Season	Episodes	First released	Last released
Pilot movie		February 22, 1972	
1	15	October 14, 1972	May 3, 1973
2	23	September 27, 1973	April 11, 1974
3	24	September 14, 1974	April 26, 1975

== Episodes ==
For the sake of the story's continuity and the logic of the wardrobe changes, it is advisable to watch the episodes according to the production codes instead of the broadcast order, especially in the third season. However, the best order for the last six episodes would be #166271, #166272, #166269, #166270, #166273, #166274.

=== Pilot movie (1972) ===
Title	Directed by	Written by	Original release date
Kung Fu: The Way of the Tiger, The Sign of the Dragon	Jerry Thorpe	Story by : Ed Spielman; Teleplay by : Ed Spielman & Howard Friedlander	February 22, 1972
Caine, the Shaolin priest, begins his journey in contention with a railroad boss. Flashbacks reveal his Shaolin beginnings.

=== Season 1 (1972–73) ===
No. overall	No. in season	Title	Directed by	Written by	Original release date	Prod. code
1	1	"King of the Mountain"	Jerry Thorpe	Herman Miller	October 14, 1972	166141
Caine finds work with a widowed ranch woman and also finds he has romantic feelings for her. But the arrival of a bounty hunter (John Saxon) and the likelihood that others will follow cast an ominous shadow on their love. Winner of the Writers Guild of America Award for Best Drama (to Herman Miller).
2	2	"Dark Angel"	Jerry Thorpe	Herman Miller	November 11, 1972	166142
Caine shows a recently blinded preacher, Serenity Johnson (John Carradine), how to rely on his other senses. Serenity, in turn, uses his new awareness to persuade Caine's closed-minded grandfather to accept the wandering monk.
3	3	"Blood Brother"	Jerry Thorpe	Herman Miller	January 18, 1973	166143
Caine refuses to leave Kilgore, Arizona, until he discovers what has happened to his Shaolin friend.
4	4	"An Eye for an Eye"	Jerry Thorpe	John Furia, Jr.	January 25, 1973	166144
A Southern family seeks vengeance against the Yankee soldier who raped and impregnated their daughter (Lane Bradbury), setting in motion an escalating cycle of violence that Caine may be powerless to stop. Winner of two Emmy Awards: (1) Best Director (Jerry Thorpe) and (2) Best Cinematography Jack Woolf.
5	5	"The Tide"	Walter Doniger	A. Martin Zweiback	February 1, 1973	166147
A man with a price on his head can spark a lot of ambitions. On the trail for his half-brother, Caine is first captured by a killer hiding behind a badge. However, while being escorted away, he is spotted and later rescued by a Chinese woman who wants to offer him to the Chinese government in exchange for her imprisoned father, a dissident author.
6	6	"The Soul Is the Warrior"	Richard Lang	Ron Bishop	February 8, 1973	166145
Caine's quest to meet his half-brother Danny leads him to a ranch where his sibling once worked and plunges the priest into a confrontation where he proves his mettle by walking through a pit of rattlesnakes.
7	7	"Nine Lives"	Allen Reisner	Herb Meadow	February 15, 1973	166146
After the death of a mining camp's feline mascot, Caine and an Irish gold prospector (Albert Salmi) embark on a trek to find a new cat – a journey that ultimately has the pair trapped at the bottom of a rapidly filling well.
8	8	"Sun and Cloud Shadow"	Robert Butler	Halsted Welles	February 22, 1973	166148
Caine brokers a settlement between a landowner and Chinese miners, but the landowner adds an unacceptable condition to the deal. A karate master intends to capture Caine.
9	9	"Chains"	Robert Butler	Story by : Paul Edwards and Gene L. Coon; Teleplay by : Gene L. Coon	March 8, 1973	166151
Imprisoned in an army outpost, Caine escapes – chained to his hulking, mountain-man cellmate … and pursued by a relentless sergeant determined to recapture them both.
10	10	"Alethea"	John Badham	William Kelley	March 15, 1973	166150
Jodie Foster guest-stars as a young girl Caine befriends, whose eyewitness testimony leads to the priest being tried for murder … and sentenced to death by hanging.
11	11	"The Praying Mantis Kills"	Charles S. Dubin	Richard Lewin	March 22, 1973	166149
Murderous thugs come looking for Caine after he identifies them as perpetrators of a bank robbery. A youth's ideas of what it means to be a man are challenged by Caine's quiet heroics.
12	12	"Superstition"	Charles S. Dubin	Story by : Dave Moessinger; Teleplay by : Ed Waters	April 5, 1973	166152
Walls imprison the men unjustly sentenced to work as miners at a brutal labor camp. Yet an even greater barrier holds them captive: fear of the camp's ancient Indian curse. But Caine knows no such fear.
13	13	"The Stone"	Robert Butler	A. Martin Zweiback	April 12, 1973	166153
A Brazilian skilled in the capoeira fighting style of his homeland accuses Caine of stealing a diamond. Street urchins offer Caine their savings of $4.08 if he'll kill an Armenian saloon piano player who jilted their mother.
14	14	"The Third Man"	Charles S. Dubin	Robert Lewin	April 26, 1973	166154
Lucky at cards, unlucky in life. A gambler on a hot streak entrusts his winnings to Caine. But the money is soon stolen, the gambler is killed, and Caine seeks answers to the mysteries surrounding both events.
15	15	"The Ancient Warrior"	Robert Butler	A. Martin Zweiback	May 3, 1973	166155
Ancient Warrior (Chief Dan George), an aged Indian accompanied by Caine, seeks burial in his sacred, ancestral land, But the burial site is located dead center in a violent, Indian-hating town called Purgatory.

=== Season 2 (1973–74) ===
No. overall	No. in season	Title	Directed by	Written by	Original release date	Prod. code
16	1	"The Well"	Jerry Thorpe	Kittridge Barton	September 27, 1973	166201
Sickened by tainted water, Caine recovers at the farm of an ex-slave (Hal Williams) who has a working well – but whose embittered spirit keeps him from sharing the water with his drought-stricken neighbors.
17	2	"The Assassin"	Richard Lang	Spooner Glass and Dan Ullman	October 4, 1973	166202
A long-festering blood feud keeps young lovers from hostile families apart…and puts Caine on a showdown course with a murderous ninja employed by one of the families.
18	3	"The Chalice"	Jerry Thorpe	William Kelley	October 11, 1973	166203
Caine promises a dying priest (Victor Millan) that he will return the liturgical chalice the priest stole, plunging the Shaolin into conflict with covetous thugs…and sparking Caine's recall of events that followed Master Po's death.
19	4	"The Brujo"	Richard Lang	Kathryn Terry and Michael S. Michaelian	October 25, 1973	166204
A powerful male witch paralyzes a small town with fear and earth. But Caine, drawing on the experience gained when he fell under a sorcerer's sway while he was a boy, knows how to fight evil. With Rodolfo Hoyos, Jr., as Esteban, Benson Fong as Sorcerer Liu, Henry Darrow as Don Emilio Fierro, and Keye Luke as Master Po.
20	5	"The Squawman"	John Llewellyn Moxey	Arthur Dales	November 1, 1973	166206
Marcus is welcome…as long as the townsfolk don't also have to welcome his Indian wife. But Caine helps hard luck Marcus to see there's much more to self-worth than the whiskey and approval of others.
21	6	"The Spirit-helper"	Walter Doniger	John T. Dugan	November 8, 1973	166205
Is Caine the answer to a young Indian brave's prayer? The youth is convinced Caine is his Spirit Guide as the two set out to rescue the boy's kidnapped mother. With Don Johnson and Bo Svenson.
22	7	"The Tong"	Robert Totten	Robert Schlitt	November 15, 1973	166208
Slave child Wing flees his master and is sheltered by Caine and a missionary woman, leading to a confrontation between the Shaolin priest and Chinese crime lords who demand the return of the boy.
23	8	"The Soldier"	Richard Lang	Story by : Calvin Clements, Jr. Teleplay by : Ed Waters	November 29, 1973	166209
His duty is to shoot to kill when so ordered. But a cavalry lieutenant (Tim Matheson) unable to take a life finds another way to prove his heroism after he falls under the influence of a fugitive he captures – a fugitive named Caine.
24	9	"The Salamander"	Richard Lang	Del Reisman	December 6, 1973	166207
Caine seeks work in a mining boomtown gone bust and becomes a confidant to a mentally troubled youth…and a target in a claim jumper's treachery. Co-stars Ed Flanders.
25	10	"The Hoots"	Robert Totten	Story by : Jason McKinnon; Teleplay by : Lionel E. Siegel	December 13, 1973	166210
Members of the peaceful Hutterite religious sect offer no resistance when persecuted by bigoted cattlemen ... until they learn from Caine that, like the chameleon, they can change and yet remain the same.
26	11	"The Elixir"	Walter Doniger	A. Martin Zweiback	December 20, 1973	166211
Caine rescues the hawkers of the cure-all Theodora's Elixir from a hostile crowd, earning the come-hither gratitude of Theodora (Diana Muldaur) and the resentment of her jealous male partner Niebo (Matt Clark).
27	12	"The Gunman"	Richard Lang	Robert Lewin	January 3, 1974	166212
The nature of love is explored in this tale of a gunslinger whose quick-draw defense of Caine and a ranch widow makes him the object of a posse's search ... and the victim of an itchy-fingered bounty hunter.
28	13	"Empty Pages of a Dead Book"	John Llewellyn Moxey	Charles A. McDaniel	January 10, 1974	166213
A son tries to honor his deceased Texas Ranger father by bringing to justice the criminals the lawman had listed in a book. But good intentions based on wrong premises lead to trouble for the son ... and for Caine. With Robert Foxworth and Slim Pickens.
29	14	"A Dream Within a Dream"	Richard Lang	John T. Dugan	January 17, 1974	166214
Caine reports that he saw a corpse hanging in a marsh. But no one in town believes Caine's report, and no body is subsequently found – yet the town's populace is mysteriously on edge. With Tina Louise and John Drew Barrymore.
30	15	"The Way of Violence Has No Mind"	Lee Philips	David Michael Korn	January 24, 1974	166215
A Chinese immigrant gang that has adopted the violent ways of the American outlaw is challenged by the physical and spiritual strength of Caine. Note: Caine's wardrobe changes from a brown shirt to a saffron yellow shirt to commemorate the passing of Bruce Lee.
31	16	"In Uncertain Bondage"	Richard Lang	Abe Polsky and Ed Waters	February 7, 1974	166216
When Caine and a Southern belle are held captive in a deep pit by kidnappers that include the woman's servants, it prompts his recall of lessons from Master Kan about the server and the served.
32	17	"Night of the Owls, Day of the Doves"	John Llewellyn Moxey	Story by : Frank Dandridge and Ed Waters; Teleplay by : Ed Waters	February 14, 1974	166217
Land bequeathed to brothel prostitutes will help them build new lives if vengeful cattlemen don't seize the land. Caine defends the women ... and also rights a long-ago wrong done by the Shaolin priesthood.
33	18	"Crossties"	Richard Lang	Robert Schmitt	February 21, 1974	166218
Caine is the man in-between during a land-rights war between farmers and railroad security agents, trying to persuade farmers to accept an offer of amnesty ... and trying to stop agents from using amnesty as a trap. With Harrison Ford.
34	19	"The Passion of Chen Yi"	John Llewellyn Moxey	John T. Dugan	February 28, 1974	166219
Unable to visit a wrongly jailed ex-Shaolin disciple, Caine commits a crime so that he can be put behind bars near him – and perhaps both right an old misunderstanding and help free the ex-Shaolin
35	20	"Arrogant Dragon"	Richard Lang	Story by : Barbara Melzer, Kathryn & Michael Michaelian; Teleplay by : Kathryn & Michael Michaelian	March 14, 1974	166220
Judgment is clear: Wu Chang must take his own life or face death at the hands of a Tong executioner. But Caine contemplates a third option, one that can help Wu Chang fake his death and escape the Tong terror.
36	21	"The Nature of Evil"	Robert Michael Lewis	Gerald Sanford	March 21, 1974	166221
An ominous killer holds the town of Nineveh in his evil grip, and only fearless but aged blind preacher Serenity Johnson (John Carradine) and his devoted friend Caine dare to confront him.
37	22	"The Cenotaph (Part 1)"	Richard Lang	William Kelley	April 4, 1974	166222
A mad mountain man, Logan McBurney, hijacks the armored gold transport Old Ironsides to haul the enormous box that he says contains his wife. As Caine rides with him, the eccentric Scotsman's devotion prompts priestly memories. In flashbacks to China, Caine falls in love for the first time.
38	23	"The Cenotaph (Part 2)"	Richard Lang	William Kelley	April 11, 1974	166223
Caine resolves his adventures with McBurney and – in flashbacks to China – a marathon kung fu battle with a warlord to win a concubine's (Nancy Kwan) heart.

=== Season 3 (1974–75) ===
No. overall	No. in season	Title	Directed by	Written by	Original release date	Prod. code
39	1	"Blood of the Dragon"	Richard Lang	John T. Dugan	September 14, 1974	166257
40	2	"Blood of the Dragon"	Richard Lang	John T. Dugan	September 14, 1974	166258
Caine returns to his grandfather's town to see him, but too late. The old man has been murdered and Caine will not leave town until he identifies the killer, even though Chinese martial arts experts bent on revenge are on his trail. Caine faces two formidable foes: a remorseless, iron-willed woman who was once his grandfather's lover and three highly trained Chinese warriors, one of whom knows how to summon forth demon fighters. Patricia Neal and Eddie Albert guest star.
41	3	"A Small Beheading"	Richard Lang	Eugene Price	September 21, 1974	166254
A sea captain (William Shatner) presents Caine with a pardon from the Emperor that will allow the priest to return to China if Caine agrees to submit to a small punishment: the removal of a little finger.
42	4	"This Valley of Terror"	Harry Harris	Story by : Katharyn Michaelian and Michael Michaelian; Teleplay by : Katharyn Michaelian	September 28, 1974	166253
Caine comes across a young woman (Sondra Locke) escaped from a mental ward. He recognizes her affliction as true visions and accompanies her on a quest to discover the source of her torment.
43	5	"The Predators"	Harry Harris	Story by : John Menken; Teleplay by : Lloyd Richards and Ed Waters	October 5, 1974	166255
Caine travels with two unlikely companions: a witness who can clear him of a criminal charge ... and a wounded Apache warrior eager to kill the witness.
44	6	"My Brother, My Executioner"	Jerry Thorpe	John T. Dugan	October 12, 1974	166252
Kwai Chang is not the only one looking for Danny Caine. Gunfighters say Danny is the best quick-draw fighter around ... and they're eager to match their deadly skills against his.
45	7	"Cry of the Night Beast"	Richard Lang	Story by : Abe Polsky and Ed Waters; Teleplay by : Ed Waters	October 19, 1974	166251
In the Old West, Caine hears the sound of a baby crying in a babbling brook and feels compelled to protect the life of a lone buffalo calf separated from its mother, remembering the time when he was a boy in the Shaolin temple when he could hear the cry of a child before it was born. Meanwhile, bounty hunters close in on him.
46	8	"The Devil's Champion"	Robert Michael Lewis	Katharyn Michaelian and Michael Michaelian	November 1, 1974	166260
In China, a champion challenges Master Kan in ritual combat to the death. Master Po, sensing an evil power supporting the champion, sends Caine to confront the devil in the palace.
47	9	"The Garments of Rage"	Marc Daniels	Theodore Apstein	November 8, 1974	166261
Caine begins working on a railroad team that is plagued by a saboteur. The saboteur is revealed to be Master Lee, angry with the railroad for the death of his nephew. Note: At the end of this episode, Caine's costume changes from the yellow shirt to a white shirt and a black jacket.
48	10	"Besieged – Part One: Death on Cold Mountain"	David Carradine	William Kelley	November 15, 1974	166262
In China, a woman (Barbara Hershey) wishes to become a member of the Shaolin in order to escape marriage to a cruel warlord. She is given shelter at the temple and runs up against strong resistance.
49	11	"Besieged – Part Two: Cannon at the Gates"	David Carradine	William Kelley and David Michael Korn	November 22, 1974	166263
In China, enemy forces threaten the temple from outside its walls. A saboteur threatens from within. And Nan Chi (Barbara Hershey), the woman who wishes to join the Shaolin group, tries to resolve the crisis alone.
50	12	"The Demon God"	David Carradine	Story by : George Clayton Johnson; Teleplay by : George Clayton Johnson and David Michael Korn	December 13, 1974	166259
In China, a prince (Brian Tochi) poisons young Caine in order to discover what it's like to journey into death, causing the Shaolin novice to experience mysterious visions of himself in the American West.
51	13	"The Vanishing Image"	Barry Crane	Gustave Field	December 20, 1974	166256
Caine finds a photographer (Lew Ayres) who may be able to identify his brother Danny in a group photo and an Indian (Tom Nardini) who wants to kill the photographer for stealing his spirit. The photographer reminds Caine of a man (Benson Fong) he knew in China who made beautiful mosaics from broken pieces of pottery. Winner of the Emmy Award for Outstanding Single Performance by a Supporting Actor in a Comedy or Drama Series to Lew Ayres
52	14	"A Lamb to the Slaughter"	Harry Harris	Story by : Robert Specht; Teleplay by : Robert Specht and David Michael Korn	January 11, 1975	166264
Caine finds the son (Alejandro Rey) of a man who died saving his father from a robber. Caine offers to fulfill his obligation with work, but he asks Caine to teach him how to fight the man (Joe Santos) exacting tribute from his village.
53	15	"The Forbidden Kingdom"	Gordon Hessler	Story by : David Michael Korn and Norman Katkov; Teleplay by : Norman Katkov	January 18, 1975	166268
Caine must find a way out of China. His path to the Forbidden Kingdom (Tibet) is blocked by Po Li (Adele Yoshioka) who betrays him to an Imperial soldier (James Shigeta) in an attempt to secure her brother's (Clyde Kusatsu) release. He must flee to the United States instead. Note: Po Li will appear again as the mother of Caine's child in Kung Fu: The Movie (1986)
54	16	"One Step to Darkness"	Marc Daniels	Story by : Gerald Sanford; Teleplay by : Robert Sherman and Theodore Apstein	January 25, 1975	166265
Caine's attempt to help a drug abuser plunges him into an interior world where he must combat a fierce demon of his own creation.
55	17	"Battle Hymn"	Barry Crane	Story by : D. C. Fontana; Teleplay by : Herman Miller	February 8, 1975	166267
A bounty hunter falls from his horse and dies while pursuing Caine. Caine buries the man, collects his things, and sets out to return them to his widow. Along the way, he joins two musicians (José Feliciano and Cannonball Adderley) on a quest to find a mystical cave. It turns out that the bounty hunter's widow (Beverly Garland) and the local sheriff (Joe Maross) are all looking for the cave too and its rich lode of silver. Meanwhile Caine remembers his conversations with Master Po about his future life outside his temple. Note: Caine shaves his head early in this episode.
56	18	"Barbary House"	Marc Daniels	Stephen Karpf and Elinor Karpf	February 15, 1975	166269
Caine is working for a fighter (Ji-Tu Cumbuka) in order to be near Danny's son, Zeke (John Blyth Barrymore). When Corbino (Leslie Nielsen) learns that Caine has fighting skills, he forces him into the ring.
57	19	"Flight to Orion"	Harry Harris	Stephen Karpf and Elinor Karpf	February 22, 1975	166270
Caine, Zeke (John Blyth Barrymore) and Zeke's mother (Lois Nettleton) travel to the city of Orion in search of Danny Caine. Corbino (Leslie Nielsen) has sent a search party out looking for them and Danny Caine.Along the way, they meet a station keeper (Don Keefer) who helps them, then betrays them; a rattlesnake; and an Indian who accuses Caine of stealing and sentences him to an ordeal. Zeke escapes and falls into the hands of Corbino.
58	20	"The Brothers Caine"	Harry Harris	Stephen Karpf and Elinor Karpf	March 1, 1975	166273
Corbino (Leslie Nielsen) tricks Zeke (John Blyth Barrymore) into revealing that his father Danny is hiding in Orion before Caine busts in and rescues him. Caine and Zeke arrive in Orion to find it overrun with bounty hunters, including Bad Sam (Carl Weathers). Zeke meets his grandfather (John Vernon) and promises to return to San Francisco with him in exchange for $1000, which he gives to his foster mother (Joanna Moore) in exchange for his father's hiding place. Zeke gives the information to Caine before leaving with his grandfather. Caine finds Danny (Tim McIntire) hiding in the silver lode mine, but not before Sam has told Danny that a Chinese bounty hunter is coming after him.
59	21	"Full Circle"	Marc Daniels	Stephen Karpf and Elinor Karpf	March 8, 1975	166274
Kwai Chang and Danny Caine (Tim McIntire) avoid bounty hunters while traveling together to San Francisco to rescue Zeke (John Blyth Barrymore) from General Cantrell (John Vernon), whom he wants to have as a successor for his ranch (as opposed to his secret half-Indian son). Caine tries to persuade the General to release Zeke from his promise to live with him. The General refuses and conspires with Corbino (Leslie Nielsen) to kill Danny.
60	22	"The Thief of Chendo"	Harry Harris	Story by : Bernard B. Bossick, Larry H. Gibson and Simon Muntner; Teleplay by : Simon Muntner	March 29, 1975	166266
Under Master Po's guidance, young Caine imagines what life as a priest will be like, envisioning an adventure involving a thief and a princess who fall in love.
61	23	"Ambush"	Gordon Hessler	Norman Katkov	April 4, 1975	166272
Serenity brings trouble. Blind preacher Serenity Johnson (John Carradine) returns, asking Caine to help him escort a shipment to San Francisco. What neither man knows is that the shipment is stolen silver bars. Rhonda Fleming guest stars.
62	24	"The Last Raid"	Alex Beaton	John T. Dugan	April 26, 1975	166271
Caine is visiting the Brown family (as seen in "The Well") when their son and his friend are taken hostage by a Confederate raider for ransom. While the friend's father (a Union doctor in the war) can pay, the major has plans to take down the man who he believed killed his son.

== See also ==
- Kung Fu: The Legend Continues
