= Robert Lawrence (producer) =

American film producer

- Born: New York City, New York, U.S.
- Occupation: Film producer
- Years active: 1980–present

Robert Lawrence is an American film producer and former studio executive.

== Early life ==
Lawrence was born in New York City and grew up in Great Neck, New York.

Lawrence graduated with honors from the University of California, Berkeley and then attended the Graduate Screenwriting Program at UCLA School of Film and Television.

== Career ==
Lawrence began his film career at Paramount in the story department, and a year later joined the Robert Evans unit as a writer.

In 1980 Lawrence joined Columbia Pictures as a vice-president of Production and was named Executive Vice President of Worldwide Production for Columbia Pictures in March 1985, where he oversaw production of films such as Ghostbusters, The Karate Kid, Tootsie and Out of Africa.

In 1986 Lawrence joined United Artists as the President of Motion Picture Production. During his time at United Artists, Lawrence oversaw productions of such films as Rain Man, Presumed Innocent and Mrs. Doubtfire. In 1987, he departed from United Artists to set up his own production company with a two-year agreement at the studio, which will be based at the United Artists headquarters in Beverly Hills. In 1990, after a string of failures, Robert Lawrence left the United Artists production house to sign a deal with 20th Century Fox.

During this time, he screened the Hong Kong action film Legacy of Rage (1986) starring Brandon Lee and saw Lee's potential to be an action leading man in Hollywood. It led to their collaboration which was Lee's first lead in an American Studio film the action thriller Rapid Fire (1992).

Lawrence founded Maysville Pictures in 1996 along with George Clooney and together produced Rock Star before the two split in 1999. As an independent producer he started his own production company, Robert Lawrence Productions. Lawrence is best known as a producer on movies such as Clueless, Die Hard with a Vengeance and The Last Castle.

== Recent Reported Activities ==
In the Winter of 2016, Variety (magazine) announced that Lin-Manuel Miranda would join Lawrence in producing TV and film adaptations of Patrick Rothfuss’ fantasy trilogy The Kingkiller Chronicle.

== Personal life ==
Lawrence has three sons and currently lives in Pacific Palisades, California.

== Filmography ==
He was a producer in all films unless otherwise noted.

=== Film ===
Year	Film	Credit
1988	It Takes Two	
1991	A Kiss Before Dying	
1992	Rapid Fire	
1995	Die Hard with a Vengeance	Executive producer
1995	Clueless	
1996	Down Periscope	
1997	Nothing to Lose	Associate producer
2001	Rock Star	
2001	The Last Castle	
2005	Mozart and the Whale	
TBA	The Kingkiller Chronicle	

=== Television ===
Year	Title	Credit	Notes
1996	Gang in Blue	Executive producer	Television film
1996−97	Martin	Associate producer Co-executive producer	
2014	Partners		
2016	Martin Lawrence: Doin' Time		Television special
2017	The Women Behind the Women: Behind Steel Dragon	Executive producer	Television film
