= Down Periscope =

- Theatrical release poster
- Directed by: David S. Ward
- Screenplay by: Hugh Wilson; Andrew Kurtzman; Eliot Wald
- Story by: Hugh Wilson
- Produced by: Robert Lawrence
- Starring: Kelsey Grammer; Lauren Holly; Rob Schneider; Harry Dean Stanton; William H. Macy; Bruce Dern; Rip Torn
- Cinematography: Victor Hammer
- Edited by: William M. Anderson; Armen Minasian
- Music by: Randy Edelman
- Distributed by: 20th Century Fox
- Release date: March 1, 1996
- Running time: 89 minutes
- Country: United States
- Language: English
- Budget: $31 million
- Box office: $37.5 million

Down Periscope is a 1996 American military comedy submarine film directed by David S. Ward, produced by Robert Lawrence, and starring Kelsey Grammer, Lauren Holly and Rob Schneider along with Bruce Dern, Harry Dean Stanton, William H. Macy and Rip Torn in supporting roles. Released by 20th Century Fox on March 1, 1996, the film focuses on Lieutenant Commander Thomas Dodge (played by Grammer), a capable, if somewhat unorthodox, U.S. Navy officer who fights to save his career after being saddled with a group of misfit seamen who have been brought together as the crew of his first command, USS Stingray, a rusty, obsolete World War II-era diesel submarine that is the focus of a special naval war game, supervised by a bitter rival (played by Dern) who is fighting to bury Dodge's career by any means necessary.

== Plot ==
Lieutenant Commander Thomas Dodge, executive officer of the Los Angeles-class attack submarine USS Orlando, is being considered for a third time to captain a submarine. Although he is a capable leader during missions, he has been previously passed over because of his unorthodox command methods that included a "brushing" incident against a Russian missile submarine three years earlier near the port of Murmansk, Russia, and a penile tattoo reading "Welcome Aboard" that he acquired as an ensign while intoxicated. If denied again, Dodge will be dismissed from the Navy's submarine command program and reassigned to a desk job.

Rear Admiral Yancy Graham, who dislikes Dodge, opposes his promotion, but Vice Admiral Dean Winslow, Commander, Submarine Force Atlantic, selects him for a war game to test the Navy's defenses against diesel-powered submarines. As Russia has been donating their diesel fleet to the United States's adversaries, Winslow orders him to restore the rusty World War II-era Balao-class diesel-powered submarine USS Stingray (SS-161) assigned to him by Graham and use it to "invade" Charleston Harbor undetected, and if successful, to sink a dummy warship in Norfolk Harbor with two live torpedoes. Initially reluctant, Dodge offers Winslow a wager: if he completes both tasks, Winslow will give him a nuclear submarine to command. Winslow agrees to consider it, instructing Dodge to "think like a pirate" rather than follow conventional war-game rules.

Graham, desiring a third star should he win, handpicks "the crew from hell" for Stingray: Lieutenant Martin G. Pascal as the executive officer; civilian naval contractor Howard as the chief engineer; Engineman First Class Brad Stepanak; Sonar Technician Second Class E.T. "Sonar" Lovacelli; Seaman Stanley "Spots" Sylvesterson as helmsman; Seaman Jefferson "Stoneball" Jackson as planesman; Electrician's Mate Michael Nitro; and Culinary Specialist Second Class Buckman as Stingray's cook. Additionally, Graham assigns a female Surface-qualified officer, Lieutenant Emily Lake, as Stingray's diving officer to see if women can successfully serve aboard submarines.

Using a storm off the Carolina coast as a diversion, Dodge and his crew offset their technological disadvantage by disguising the Stingray as a fishing trawler to infiltrate Charleston Harbor and ignite signal flares. Desperate to defeat Dodge, Graham halves the game's containment area without Winslow's authorization. Encountering trouble on their first attempt at Norfolk Harbor and narrowly escaping the Orlando, Dodge leaves the containment area and heads out to sea, breaking all contact with the Navy. Irate at this lapse in protocol, Pascal chastises him for hijacking his own boat and attempts to usurp him. The other crew members, weary of Pascal's berating and harassment, turn against him, and Dodge charges him with attempted mutiny. On deck, Lake witnesses Dodge and the crew, dressed up as and speaking like pirates, commit a mock execution by making a blindfolded Pascal walk the plank into the net of a waiting fishing trawler that will take him ashore.

During the Stingray's second attempt at Norfolk, Graham, hellbent on stopping Dodge, assumes command of the Orlando from its commanding officer Commander Carl Knox. Dodge employs a dangerous maneuver—passing Stingray between the propellers of a commercial supertanker to avoid sonar detection by the naval ships and aircraft protecting the approach to Norfolk. By the time the Orlando eventually locates and targets the Stingray, Dodge has already fired two live torpedoes at 900 yards (820 m) into a target ship anchored in Norfolk Harbor, thereby winning the war game.

After Dodge's crew returns to port, Winslow chastises a humiliated Graham and denies him his promotion. He congratulates Dodge, informing him that he will be given command of a new Seawolf-class submarine, along with a "proper crew" to man her. Dodge requests that his entire Stingray crew be transferred with him; Winslow agrees, noting that Stepanak is his son, using his mother's surname to avoid favoritism, and informs Dodge that he will be promoted to Commander. After Dodge dismisses his crew to begin a well-earned shore leave, Lake asks him about his tattoo; he begins telling her the story as the two leave the dock together.

== Cast ==
- Kelsey Grammer as Lieutenant Commander Thomas "Tom" Dodge, Commanding Officer of USS Stingray (formerly Executive Officer of USS Orlando)
- Bruce Dern as Rear Admiral Yancy Graham, Blue Team leader of the war game
- William H. Macy as Commander Carl Knox, Commanding Officer of USS Orlando
- Rip Torn as Vice Admiral Dean Winslow, Commander, Submarine Force Atlantic (COMSUBLANT)

USS Stingray's crew:

- Lauren Holly as Lieutenant Emily Lake, Diving Officer and Acting Executive Officer of USS Stingray
- Rob Schneider as Lieutenant Martin G. "Marty" Pascal, Executive Officer of USS Stingray
- Harry Dean Stanton as Howard, Stingray's chief engineer, a civilian contractor
- Ken Hudson Campbell as Culinary Specialist Second Class Buckman, Stingray's cook
- Toby Huss as Electrician's Mate Michael "Mike" Nitro, electrician of USS Stingray
- Duane Martin as Seaman Jefferson "Stoneball" Jackson, planesman
- Jonathan Penner as Seaman Stanley "Spots" Sylvesterson, helmsman
- Bradford Tatum as Engineman First Class Bradley "Brad" Stepanak, Stingray's leading engineman and Vice Admiral Winslow's son
- Harland Williams as Sonar Technician Second Class E.T. "Sonar" Lovacelli
- Patton Oswalt as Stingray radioman (film debut)

== Production ==
The name of the film is a play on the title of the 1959 World War II drama Up Periscope and spoofs several titles in the submarine film subgenre, including the Cold War drama The Hunt for Red October.

Down Periscope began shooting on May 6, 1995, and finished on July 27.

USS Pampanito, a Balao-class submarine from World War II, now a museum ship and memorial in San Francisco, played the part of USS Stingray. The nearby Suisun Bay Reserve Fleet stood in for Naval Station Norfolk.

The film makes use of both standard U.S. Navy stock footage and scenes shot specifically for the film. The target ship that is torpedoed and sunk, ending the film's war game, is both naval stock footage of the USS Fletcher and a prop shooting miniature. Fletcher was one of the most decorated ships in U.S. Navy history. Over the closing credits, a music video is shown of the Village People and the film's cast performing "In the Navy" aboard Stingray.

== Release ==
Down Periscope had its U.S. theatrical release on March 1, 1996. The film grossed $25,785,603 domestically and $37,553,752 worldwide. The film was released on home video five months later, on August 6, 1996.

== Reception ==
On the review aggregator website Rotten Tomatoes, the film has a score of 11% from 35 reviews, with an average rating 4.1/10. The site's consensus states: "Down Periscope takes audiences on an aimless voyage for aquatic hijinks, proving there really aren't any effective substitutes for a well-written script." On Metacritic, the film receive a score of 39 based on 18 reviews, indicating "generally unfavorable" reviews.

Variety wrote, "The makers of Police Academy and Major League team up to take on the submarine corps [...] and the result is a testosterone comedy that’s crude fun, with a pinch of corn-pone morality. It’s good-natured, innocuous frivolity that should raise a few smiles..." However, Stephen Holden of The New York Times felt, "The tone of the acting, which is set by Mr. Grammer's blandly laid-back performance, is all wrong for a genre that demands over-the-top hamming". Holden also wrote that the film does manage to provide "a couple of amusing bits", but "The energy level of Down Periscope is so low that moments like these, which should flare hilariously, reach a wan flicker".

== See also ==
- Operation Petticoat (1959)
