= Rapid Fire (1992 film) =

1992 film directed by Dwight H. Little

- Theatrical release poster
- Directed by: Dwight H. Little
- Screenplay by: Alan B. McElroy
- Story by: Cindy Cirile; Alan B. McElroy
- Produced by: Robert Lawrence
- Starring: Brandon Lee; Powers Boothe; Nick Mancuso; Raymond J. Barry
- Cinematography: Ric Waite
- Edited by: Gib Jaffe
- Music by: Christopher Young
- Production company: 20th Century Fox
- Distributed by: 20th Century Fox
- Release date: August 21, 1992
- Running time: 95 minutes
- Country: United States
- Language: English
- Box office: $14.4 million (North America)

Rapid Fire is a 1992 American action film directed by Dwight H. Little from a screenplay by Alan B. McElroy, and starring Brandon Lee (in his penultimate film role), Powers Boothe, Kate Hodge and Nick Mancuso. It follows a witnessing martial artist and a police lieutenant attempting to apprehend two drug lords.

The film was released in the United States by 20th Century Fox on August 21, 1992.

== Plot ==
In the Golden Triangle region of Thailand, American mafia drug distributor Antonio Serrano visits long-time associate Kinman Tau, a drug kingpin. Serrano is having troubles and wants them to work together, but his request is not reciprocated.

Turned off from politics after witnessing the death of his father at Tiananmen Square in China, Los Angeles art student Jake Lo is lured to a party of Chinese pro-democracy activists. While there, he witnesses Serrano killing party sponsor Carl Chang, who was an associate of Tau. When Serrano and his men attempt to kill Jake, he swiftly disarms them using martial arts techniques. Jake is placed under protective custody by federal agents, who coerce him into coming to Chicago and testifying against Serrano.

When the agents at the safe house are revealed to be corrupt, Jake escapes through the window and encounters a young police detective named Karla Withers. Withers' partner, Lieutenant Mace Ryan, helps Jake evade his pursuers and reveals that he has been pursuing Tau for ten years.

Jake is persuaded by Ryan to help him exploit Serrano's FBI ties and obtain information about Tau's next shipment. Though the sting operation is successful, Jake is nearly killed in a barrage of gunfire and assaults Ryan after he reveals his involvement was not necessary. Later that night, Karla invites Jake to her apartment and shows him his father's confidential file. After an intimate discussion, they realize their feelings for each other and have sex. Meanwhile, Ryan and his team lead a raid at the revealed location of the next shipment: Tau's laundry factory. Both the sex and the events of the raid are shown alternately as they occur in actual time, culminating with Serrano being murdered in his cell by one of Tau's henchman.

Jake, Ryan and Withers subsequently team up to bring down Tau once more. Though Ryan and Withers are captured by Tau's men, Jake rescues them and eventually kills Tau at a train platform. He and Karla then evacuate Ryan from the burning factory and ride to the hospital together in an ambulance.

== Cast ==
- Brandon Lee as Jake Lo
- Powers Boothe as CPD Lieutenant Mace Ryan
- Nick Mancuso as Antonio Serrano
- Raymond J. Barry as FBI Agent Frank Stewart
- Kate Hodge as CPD Detective Karla Withers
- Tzi Ma as Kinman Tau
- Tony Longo as Brunner Gazzi
- Michael Paul Chan as Carl Chang
- Dustin Nguyen as Paul Yang
- Brigitta Stenberg as Rosalyn
- Basil Wallace as Agent Wesley
- Al Leong as Minh
- François Chau as Farris
- Quentin O'Brien as Agent Daniels
- Roy Abramsohn as Agent Klein
- C'Esca Lawrence as Lisa Stewart
- Michael Chong as John Lo
- Jeff McCarthy as Agent Anderson
- Richard Schiff as Art Teacher

== Production ==
=== Background and development ===
Dwight H. Little's work had attracted the attention of Steven Seagal, but his usual studio partner Warner Bros. was reticent to hire the director of Halloween 4: The Return of Michael Myers, a horror film. Seagal used a clause in his contract that enabled him to make one film for a different company, and set up Marked for Death at Fox, where Little was approved by studio boss Joe Roth. Marked for Death was a hit and established Little as an action director.

Interested in building up an action star of their own, Fox retained Little's services for a new vehicle starring Brandon Lee, whose name held great marketing upside, although Little found him to be a commandable actor as well. Director of photography Ric Waite and stage actor Basil Wallace, who played the main bad guy "Screwface" in Marked for Death, also returned.

The film's impetus came from producer Robert Lawrence, who had come across Lee's early Hong Kong feature Legacy of Rage. Its working title was Moving Target. Before Little was hired by Fox, John Woo was in talks to direct. According to Lee, the script was tailored for him, and he had access to screenwriter Alan B. McElroy from the get-go. Cindy Cirile, the wife and frequent collaborator of executive producer John Fasano, also contributed to the story. Paul Attanasio performed some uncredited rewrites. Nonetheless, Little was dissatisfied with the way the second antagonist was reintroduced later into the story, which he felt was anticlimactic and hampered the picture's reception.

=== Casting ===
Fox's PR campaign for the film used the motto "Brandon Lee, the Action Hero of the 90s", which the actor found overly emphatic, as he considered Rapid Fire to be his first legitimate starring role. While comfortable with his father's legacy, Lee saw the film as a springboard to mainstream success, and hoped to one day transition to a broader acting career akin to those of Johnny Depp or Mel Gibson. During the shoot, he met Raymond J. Barry, a respected stage performer and dramatist, and expressed interest in starring in one of his plays to build up his credibility. Barry was excited by the prospect, and too thought of Lee as a capable performer, beyond the obvious exposure benefits of casting him.

Due to Seagal's aikido techniques relying on using his opponents' own momentum against themselves, rather than raw aggression, Little felt that he had to build a traditional cop film atmosphere around them to maintain tension, whereas Lee's more kinetic style lent itself to a purer action film. Lee choreographed the action scenes in cooperation with stunt coordinator, personal friend and fellow Jeet Kun Do practitioner Jeff Imada Lee broke a toe during the shoot, which caused his foot to swell up and hamper his mobility. Some action scenes had to be switched around to accommodate his impairment while he healed.

=== Filming ===
Principal photography started on May 28, 1991, and was announced as completed on October 8, 1991. The prologue was shot on location in Thailand. The rest of the film was shot in the Los Angeles and Chicago areas, where it is set. The interior of the Chicago restaurant, where one of the film's larger setpieces takes place, had to be rebuilt on a Valencia, California set in order to film the collapse of its balcony.

== Release ==
=== Home media ===
The film was released on VHS in the U.S. on February 24, 1993. It performed solidly in rental stores, cracking the top 10 of the Billboard charts, which analysts described as uncommon for a film led by a martial artist. Although there were reports of heightened interest in Lee's movies following his death while shooting The Crow, Rapid Fire spent seven weeks in the top 20, the better part of it unaffected by the media attention surrounding his untimely demise.

20th Century Fox Home Entertainment released the DVD in Region 2 in the United Kingdom on July 16, 2001, and Region 1 in the United States on May 21, 2002. Twilight Time released the film in a limited Blu-ray edition on August 21, 2018.

== Soundtrack ==
The film's score was composed by Christopher Young. It was issued on CD and cassette by Varèse Sarabande at the time of its theatrical release. Young contributed an audio commentary of the film to its Blu-ray re-release, which also offers an isolated score track. The soundtrack features two songs by hard rock band Hardline.

== Reception ==
=== Theatrical ===
The film debuted at number 3 at the domestic box office. It finished its North American run with a US$14,4 million tally.

=== Critical response ===
Stephen Hunter of the Baltimore Sun wrote that the film's fast pace, which he compared to video games, leaves Lee unable to show his charisma. Although he called the film a "disaster", Chicago Tribune critic Gene Siskel called Lee likable and appealing. Writing in the Los Angeles Times, Kevin Thomas described the film as "better than Enter the Dragon" and a star-making role for Lee. Stephen Holden of The New York Times said the film exploits the death of Lee's father, martial arts actor Bruce Lee, to make his character seem more sympathetic.

On Rotten Tomatoes, it has an approval rating of 45% based on 22 reviews; the average rating is 4.86/10. Audiences polled by CinemaScore gave the film an average grade of "B+" on an A+ to F scale.

=== Director's response ===
Little reflected on Rapid Fire with mixed feelings. He acknowledges that the film was a deliberate attempt by Fox to launch Brandon Lee as an action star: “At that time, you could make four or five successful action movies in a row if you had a Chuck Norris. They clearly wanted their own in-house action star. And Brandon was young, handsome, he had the pedigree, he could do the action."

However, he also critiqued the film's structure, particularly the decision to have two villains. He explains, “We had two villains. [...] In retrospect, what we should have done was combine the two villains and work our way up to one climactic scene.” He believes this would have given the film more emotional impact and possibly led to greater success. Despite these flaws, Little is proud of the film's overall execution and Brandon Lee's performance, calling Rapid Fire “so much fun.”

== Aftermath ==
According to some outlets, the script Simon Says by Jonathan Hensleigh, which was eventually used for Die Hard with a Vengeance, had been considered for a sequel to Rapid Fire. However, no direct source is mentioned. Angela Bassett was projected to co-star as an African-American community activist. She remained under consideration as the film was being retooled into a Die Hard sequel, before the character was rewritten as a male and given to Samuel L. Jackson.

In 1995, Powers Boothe and Raymond J. Barry were reunited to support another martial arts actor, Jean-Claude Van Damme, in his vehicle Sudden Death. In that film, Boothe plays the villain, while Barry plays a virtuous U.S. vice president.

Dustin Nguyen met Brandon Lee's sister Shannon Lee on the set of this film, and would later work on the TV series she created based on Bruce Lee's writings, Warrior. However, his booking on that show owed more to his connection with its executive producer Justin Lin.
