= Jeff Imada =

American stunt performer (born 1955)

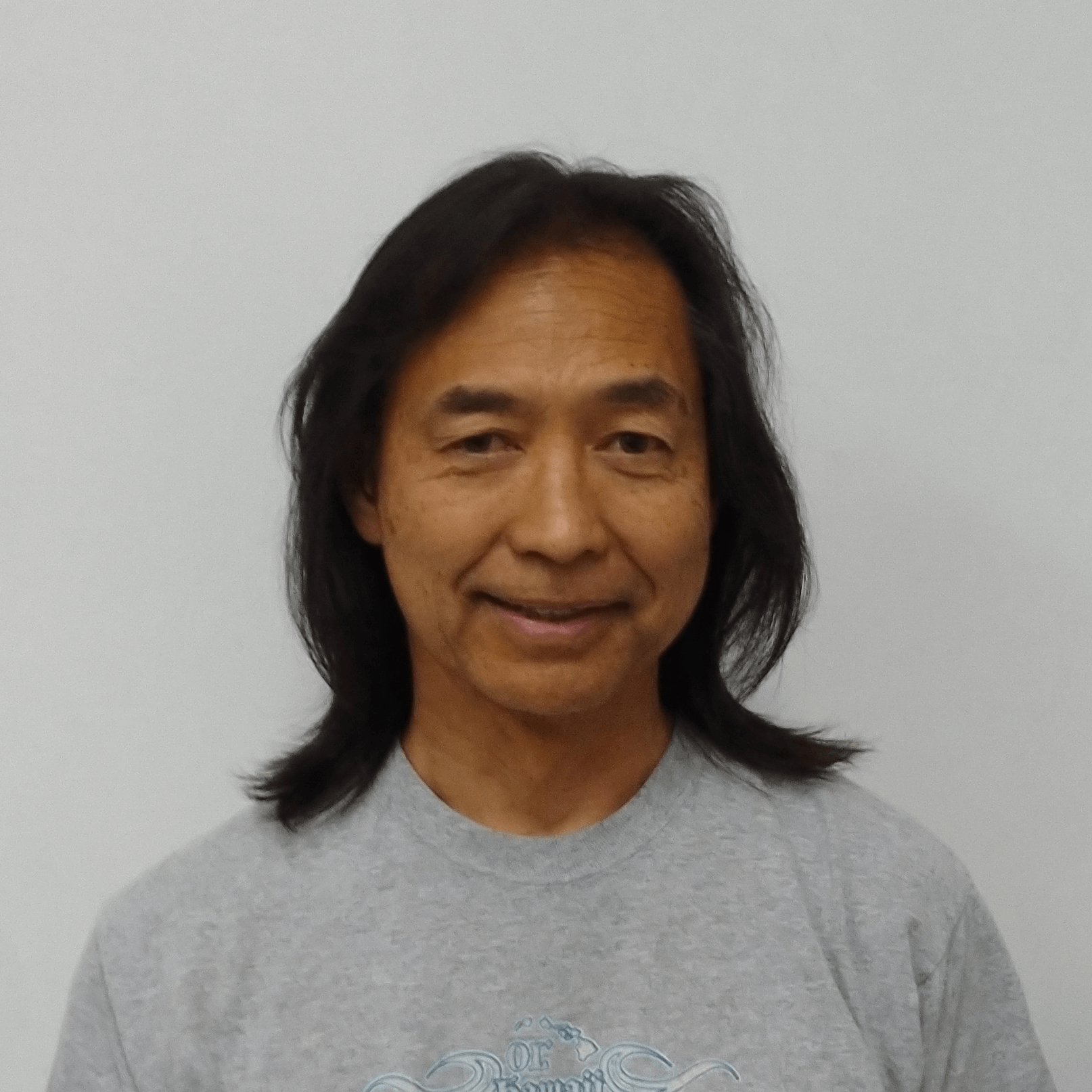
- Imada in 2019
- Born: June 17, 1955 (age 71); Inglewood, California, United States
- Occupations: Actor, director and stuntman

Jeff Imada (born June 17, 1955) is an American martial artist, stuntman, and actor. He has performed stunts in over 100 films and television programs and authored one of the first books published in the US about the balisong. Jeff Imada is trained in Jeet Kune Do, Eskrima, Tae Kwon Do, Tang Soo Do, Karate, Shaolin Kung Fu, Kendo, Systema, Daitō-ryū Aiki-jūjutsu and Boxing.

== Life and career ==
Imada was born in Inglewood, California, US, where he began studying martial arts at the age of fifteen. At El Camino College and UCLA, he majored in pre-med and minored in music as a classically trained pianist. While in college, he started working as a film "extra", which led to his becoming a member of the Screen Actors Guild, Stunts Unlimited and the Directors Guild of America. Jeff Imada has been the technical advisor on numerous films, including Dutch (1991), Tango & Cash (1989), Jumpin' Jack Flash (1986), Dreamscape (1984) and Streets of Fire (1984), and such television series as Magnum, P.I. (1980), Remington Steele (1982), Dynasty (1981), Matt Houston (1982), Airwolf (1984), Stingray (1986), Hart to Hart (1979) and Tales of the Gold Monkey (1982).

He was a close friend to Brandon Lee with whom he studied Jeet Kune Do under the tutelage of Dan Inosanto. He was the primary fight choreographer on Lee's final film, The Crow.

Imada has authored two books on the history and use of the balisong and designed a particular grind known as the "Imada High Hollow" for Pacific Cutlery that was ground by knifemaker Jody Samson. The Balisong Manual was one of the first books published in the US about this unusual knife.

Jeff Imada has recently come to further attention by being the chief fight coordinator in the Matt Damon action films The Bourne Supremacy and The Bourne Ultimatum, as well as participating as the motion capture artist for the Xbox and PlayStation game The Bourne Conspiracy.

In 2015, Imada was recognized by East West Players (EWP) with the Visionary Award for raising "the visibility of the Asian Pacific American (APA) community through [his] craft." He had been involved with EWP "off and on" for many years due to his personal connection to Mako, one of the founders of the theatre company.

== Filmography ==
- Furious 7 (2015) (fight choreographer)
- Breaking Dawn Part 2 (2012) (fight/stunt coordinator)
- The Green Hornet (2011) (fight/stunt coordinator)
- Hanna (2011) (fight/stunt coordinator)
- Breaking Dawn Part 1 (2011) (fight/stunt coordinator)
- Repo Men (2010) (fight choreographer)
- The Book of Eli (2010) (stunt coordinator)
- Eclipse (2010) (fight/stunt coordinator)
- New Moon (2009) (fight/stunt coordinator)
- Twilight (2008) (fight/stunt coordinator)
- Mask of the Ninja (2008) (stunts)
- Role Models (2008) (stunt coordinator)
- Balls of Fury (2007) (stunts)
- The Bourne Ultimatum (2007) (fight stunt coordinator)
- Planet Terror (2007) (stunts)
- The Gene Generation (2007) (stunt action director)
- Park (2006) (stunt coordinator)
- When a Stranger Calls (2006) (stunt coordinator)
- In Her Shoes (2005) (stunt coordinator)
- Serenity (2005) (stunts)
- Mr. & Mrs. Smith (2005) (utility stunts)
- The Hard Easy (2005) (stunts)
- Collateral (2004) (stunts) (uncredited)
- The Bourne Supremacy (2004) (fight stunt coordinator)
- The Ladykillers (2004) (stunts)
- Spartan (2004) (stunt coordinator)
- Stuck on You (2003) (stunts)
- Daredevil (2003) (stunt coordinator) (wire choreographer)
- 8 Mile (2002) (stunt coordinator)
- Serving Sara (2002) (stunt coordinator)
- The Time Machine (2002) (stunt coordinator)
- Rock Star (2001) (stunts)
- Ghosts of Mars (2001) (stunt coordinator)
- Ticker (2001) (stunts)
- Little Nicky (2000) (stunt coordinator)
- Forever Lulu (2000) (stunt coordinator)
- Disney's The Kid (2000) (utility stunts)
- Gone in 60 Seconds (2000) (stunts)
- Wonder Boys (2000) (stunt coordinator)
- Hanging Up (2000) (stunts)
- The Green Mile (1999) (stunt coordinator)
- Fight Club (1999) (stunt coordinator)
- Crazy in Alabama (1999) (stunt coordinator)
- Enemy of the State (1998) (stunt player)
- Rush Hour (1998) (stunts)
- Blade (1998) (stunt coordinator: additional photography) (stunts)
- The Negotiator (1998) (stunts)
- Lethal Weapon 4 (1998) (stunts)
- Armageddon (1998/I) (stunts)
- Vampires (1998) (stunt coordinator)
- U.S. Marshals (1998) (stunts)
- The Replacement Killers (1998) (stunts)
- Most Wanted (1997) (stunts)
- Nothing to Lose (1997) (stunts)
- L.A. Confidential (1997) (stunt coordinator)
- Volcano (1997) (stunts)
- Spy Game (1997) (stunt coordinator)
- Dante's Peak (1997) (stunt coordinator: second unit)
- Beverly Hills Ninja (1997) (stunts)
- Marshal Law (1996) (stunts)
- The Glimmer Man (1996) (stunts)
- Escape from L.A. (1996) as 'Mojo' Dellasandro (stunt coordinator)
- Spy Hard (1996) (stunts)
- From Dusk till Dawn (1996) (stunts) (as Jeffrey Imada)
- Heat (1995) (stunts)
- Money Train (1995) (stunts)
- Jade (1995) (stunts)
- To the Limit (1995) (stunts: Los Angeles)
- The Last Word (1995) (stunts)
- Waterworld (1995) (stunts)
- Free Willy 2: The Adventure Home (1995) (stunt coordinator)
- Mortal Kombat (1995) (fire stunt double: Scorpion)
- Village of the Damned (1995) (stunt coordinator) (stunts)
- In the Mouth of Madness (1995) (stunt coordinator) (stunts)
- One Tough Bastard (1995) (stunts)
- Double Dragon (1994) (stunt coordinator)
- The Puppet Masters (1994) (stunts)
- The Crow (1994) (stunt coordinator)
- Naked Gun 33 1/3: The Final Insult (1994) (stunts)
- Vanishing Son (1994) (TV) (stunts)
- On Deadly Ground (1994) (stunts)
- The Criminal Mind (1993) (stunts)
- Showdown (1993/I) (stunt coordinator)
- Even Cowgirls Get the Blues (1993) (stunts) (as Jeffrey Imada)
- Undercover Blues (1993) (stunts) (as Jeffrey Imada)
- Body Bags (1993) (TV) (stunt coordinator)
- Rising Sun (1993) (stunt coordinator)
- Hot Shots! Part Deux (1993) (stunts)
- Excessive Force (1993) (stunts)
- Robot Wars (1993) (stunts)
- Falling Down (1993) (stunts)
- Rapid Fire (1992) (stunt coordinator)
- Raven (1992) TV series (stunt coordinator)
- Patriot Games (1992) (stunts)
- Memoirs of an Invisible Man (1992) (stunt coordinator)
- Kuffs (1992) (stunts)
- Star Trek VI: The Undiscovered Country (1991) (stunts)
- Showdown in Little Tokyo (1991) (stunts)
- V.I. Warshawski (1991) (stunts)
- Point Break (1991) (stunts)
- Fever (1991) (TV) (stunt coordinator)
- The Perfect Weapon (1991) (stunts)
- Highlander II: The Quickening (1991) (stunts)
- Kindergarten Cop (1990) (stunts)
- Captain America (1990) (stunts)
- The Rookie (1990) (stunts)
- The Big One: The Great Los Angeles Earthquake (1990) (TV) (stunt coordinator)
- Marked for Death (1990) (stunts)
- Come See the Paradise (1990) (stunts)
- Ghost Dad (1990) (stunts)
- The Last of the Finest (1990) (stunts)
- Angel Town (1990) (stunt coordinator)
- Tremors (1990) (stunts)
- Why Me? (1990) (stunts)
- Vietnam, Texas (1990) (stunts)
- Tango & Cash (1989) (stunts)
- Road House (1989) (stunts) (as Jeffrey Imada)
- Hyper Space (1989) (stunt coordinator)
- Bill & Ted's Excellent Adventure (1989) (stunts) (as Jeffrey Imada)
- Who's Harry Crumb? (1989) (stunts)
- Kinjite: Forbidden Subjects (1989) (stunts)
- Gleaming the Cube (1989) (stunts)
- One Man Force (1989) (stunts)
- They Live (1988) (stunt coordinator)
- The Dead Pool (1988) (stunts)
- The Presidio (1988) (stunts)
- Prince of Darkness (1987) (stunt coordinator)
- Beauty and the Beast (1987) TV series (stunts)
- Steele Justice (1987) (stunts)
- Lethal Weapon (1987) (stunts)
- The Golden Child (1986) (stunts)
- Big Trouble in Little China (1986) (as "Needles") (stunts)
- Police Academy 3: Back in Training (1986) (stunts)
- Gung Ho (1986) (stunts)
- Hollywood Vice Squad (1986) (stunts)
- House (1986) (stunts)
- Pee-wee's Big Adventure (1985) (stunts)
- Rambo: First Blood Part II (1985) (stunts) (as Jeffrey Imada)
- Missing in Action 2: The Beginning (1985) (stunts)
- Dreamscape (1984)
- Uncommon Valor (1983) (stunts)
- Breathless (1983) (stunts)
- Fire and Ice (1983) (stunts)
- Blue Thunder (1983) (stunts)
- The A-Team (1983) TV series (stunts)
- Matt Houston (1982) TV series (stunts)
- Blade Runner (1982) (stunts)
- Cheech and Chong's Nice Dreams (1981) (Wine steward)
