= Kwai Chang Caine =

Fictional character

- Kung Fu character
- First appearance: Kung Fu
- Created by: Ed Spielman
- Portrayed by: David Carradine (adult); Keith Carradine (younger); Radames Pera (child); Stephen Manley (youngest)

In-universe information
- Gender: Male
- Occupation: Shaolin Priest
- Family: Danny Caine (half-brother)
- Religion: Taoism, Chan Buddhism
- Nationality: Chinese

Kwai Chang Caine (Chinese: 虔官昌; pinyin: Qián Guānchāng) is a fictional character and the protagonist of the ABC 1972–1975 action-adventure western television series Kung Fu. He has been portrayed by David Carradine as an adult Caine, Keith Carradine as a younger Caine, Radames Pera as the child Caine, and Stephen Manley as the youngest Caine.

In late 19th-century China, Kwai Chang Caine was the orphaned son of an American man and a Chinese woman. He was raised in a Shaolin Monastery in Henan Province and was trained by the monks to be a Shaolin master. The audience follows his adventures as he travels to the American Old West (armed only with his skill in martial arts) as he seeks his half-brother, Danny Caine. Although it was his intention to find his brother Danny in a way that would escape notice, the demands of his training as a priest in addition to his sense of social responsibility, instilled within him during his childhood, forced Caine to repeatedly come into the open to fight for justice. He would then leave his new surroundings to continue his search for anonymity and security.

In the Shaolin arts, monks live in temples and most stay their entire lives. Once they become masters and leave the temple, they are referred to as "priests". In real-world Shaolin, both monks and priests shave their heads and some remain celibate. However, Caine grew his hair long and occasionally had intimate relations with women in the series.

== Development ==
Regarding the origins of the character and the series concept, see Kung Fu: Bruce Lee's involvement.

Regarding the issue of the actor's casting, see Kung Fu: Casting controversy.

In a May 1973 interview by Black Belt Magazine to John Furia Jr., the series story editor, expresses his view of the character:

Essentially, the story is one of contrast. It is about a man of peace and love placed in a violent time and place – the 1870s in the American West. It is parallel to today's atmosphere. We emphasize love and peace, yet we are experiencing violent times.

The point of view of the series is enormously appealing to all people. Caine avoids violence as much as he can. When he does occasionally get involved, it is not glamorized. On the contrary, it is depicted as sad and unglamorous.

The story also deals with inner serenity which comes from a person being in touch and in communion with his own senses and his own self and, hopefully, in touch with his entire universe; or, putting it simply, one with the universe, one with nature. It is tremendously contemporary.

People today are attempting to live in communes. They want to get away from the clutter, pressure, and brutality of contemporary society. They feel they are depersonalized. There is a tremendous similarity between Caine and them.

== Synopsis ==
Orphaned after his maternal grandfather's death, Caine eventually found himself outside the local Shaolin temple along with other hopeful candidates. After waiting patiently for several days, Caine and the few other remaining candidates were taken inside the temple where only Caine passed a subtle test in manners. Although taking a student of mixed parentage into the order was unprecedented, the head monk Master Kan (Philip Ahn) sagely noted, "There is a first for everything," and welcomed Caine.

Following his induction into the order, Caine then lived in the temple until adulthood, mastering many of the fighting forms and lessons taught by the Shaolin monks (Crane, Snake, Praying Mantis, Tiger, and Dragon). At one point during his training he was shown the various forms and Master Kan explained that it may take half a lifetime to master one of the forms. Later, while in the US, when asked by a student which forms he teaches, Caine's response was, "All of them" (a tribute to Master Kan, who had answered young Caine similarly when asked the same question).

One of his first instructors was the blind master named Po (Keye Luke). Po considered Caine his favorite pupil and behaved more like an elderly grandfather. Caine was given the nickname "Grasshopper" by Master Po; the reference was from an exchange where the still ignorant young Caine asked the old blind master how he could function without seeing. Po asked Caine to close his eyes and describe what he could hear. Caine explained that he could hear the water flowing in a nearby fountain and birds in a nearby cage. Po then asked if Caine could hear his own heartbeat or the grasshopper at his feet (Caine hadn't noticed the insect until that moment). Incredulous, Caine asked Po, "Old man – how is it that you hear these things?" Po's reply was, "Young man, how is it that you do not?" From that point on, Po affectionately called Caine "Grasshopper".

Kung Fu wanted poster

Years after his graduation, Caine traveled to the Forbidden City to meet Po, whose lifelong ambition had been to travel to a festival at the Temple of Heaven on that date, the full moon of May - the 13th day of the 5th month in the Year of the Dog (May 13, 1874). While they were talking together in the street, the Emperor's nephew and his entourage came along and an altercation ensued when a guard tried to push Po aside and was sent sprawling by the blind Shaolin. While defending himself from the other guards, Master Po was shot by the Emperor's nephew. Before the nephew could reload his pistol, the enraged Caine seized a guard's fallen spear and killed the Imperial nephew. With his dying words, Po gave Caine his pouch containing his few worldly possessions and instructed Caine to flee from China as there would be both no place to hide and a price on his head. Before he fled China, Caine returned to the temple to confess his deed to Master Kan. Later, Imperial guards attacked and stormed the temple, only to find it deserted (the monks had fled before the army's arrival); in retaliation, they burned the temple to the ground.

At first, Caine tried to flee to Tibet but was unsuccessful. He then escaped to the American Old West and in the first-season episode "Dark Angel" discovered from his grandfather Henry Caine (Dean Jagger) that he had a half-brother named Daniel. While he searched for Danny, he was on the run from a steady stream of bounty hunters and Chinese agents, some of whom were also Shaolin priests like himself, searching for him. In the pilot episode when another priest arrived to take him into custody, telling Caine that he had been searching for him for many weeks and that it had long been known he had fled to the US, Caine said to him, "For money? A Shaolin monk does not sell himself for a handful of rice." The monk's reply was, "You are more than a handful of rice" (the price placed on Caine's head by the Imperial government being $10,000 alive, $5,000 dead). Caine's hanfu was seen as gold with a red belt and the symbol of an open hand on the back (indicating that he is a master of all five forms), while his opponent was black with a maroon belt and the symbol of a snake on the back. In the ensuing fight, Caine killed the monk.

The conflict between a desire for anonymity and a sense of social responsibility is conveyed through the frequent use of flashbacks. In these flashbacks, the adult Caine (Carradine) recalls a particular lesson during his training in the monastery, taught to him by Master Po and Master Kan.

During the concluding four episodes of the third and final season, Caine found not only his brother Daniel but his nephew Zeke as well.

== Characteristics and skills ==
Master Po (left) and Kwai Chang Caine (right) in a flashback from the episode "Dark Angel", written by Herman Miller

Caine's training involved both armed and unarmed combat. He was also tutored in eastern philosophy and herbal medicine. Upon graduation, he attained the rank of Shaolin Master and exited the temple via a special corridor designed as a last test. Barring the exit was a cauldron filled with hot coals, whose rim bore dragon and tiger figures on its underside, directly across from each other. By lifting the cauldron with his forearms and moving it aside, the graduate branded himself with the figures; the burns and the scars they left behind served to indicate his new status. On several occasions, Caine's scars identified him as a Shaolin monk to those familiar with Chinese culture.

Caine is humble, intelligent, inquisitive, and usually very soft-spoken. His only known pastimes are playing a bamboo flute and meditation. Caine is fluent in both Cantonese and English. He is also skilled in herbalism and healing.

== Love life ==
As Caine explained to his brother in the fourth-to-last episode of the series, "Full Circle", the Shaolin life "is not one of restriction". Caine frequently had romantic relationships with women and even contemplated marriage on at least two occasions.

In the first episode, "King of the Mountain", Lara Parker plays a widowed ranch owner with whom Caine finds employment. She offers him money for his labors, but he refuses saying that all he needs is food and place to sleep. She presses him and insists there must be more he needs (i.e., sex). It is subtly implied that she eventually supplies what he needs. It is also implied that she is attracted by the "tattoos" on his forearms.

In the episode "The Tide", Caine falls in love with Su Yen, played by Tina Chen, the daughter of a philosopher and author with whom Caine is familiar. The town Sheriff recognizes Kwai Chang from the Wanted Poster. While in custody, Kwai Chang is wounded. He escapes, and Su Yen hides him in a cave at the beach. There are scenes of passionate kissing, after which Su Yen is shown waking on the sleeping mat and reaching out for Kwai Chang, only to find that he is not there. The scenes strongly indicate that Kwai Chang and Su Yen had had sex. It turns out that Su Yen, however, seeks to trade Caine to the Emperor in exchange for her father who is imprisoned in China.

The two-part second-season episode, "Cenotaph", relates an episode from Caine's past, when the Emperor's favorite concubine, Mayli Ho (played by Nancy Kwan) takes Caine's virginity. Caine falls in love with her, even contemplating marriage. It is because she truly loves him that Mayli ultimately rejects a devastated Caine, knowing her lifestyle and ways would eventually destroy him and all that he stands for. The third season episode, "The Forbidden Kingdom", depicts Caine's first days on the run after killing the Emperor's nephew. In his efforts to flee China and escape the Emperor's men, Caine meets Po Li, played by Adele Yoshioka. At first, Po Li betrays Caine in order to save her brother who is the Emperor's prisoner. Eventually, she redeems herself and aids in Caine's escape, telling him, "I will have much to remember". Caine will not learn until many years later that this brief, one-time union resulted in the conception of a son, Chung Wang, played by Brandon Lee (Bruce Lee's son) in the 1986 made for TV movie, Kung Fu: The Movie.

In the waning days of her relationship with David Carradine, Barbara Hershey appeared in a season three two-part episode, "Besieged". She played the role of Nan Chi, a half-Chinese, half-Caucasian woman who wanted to become a disciple of the Shaolin. She and Kwai Chang clearly fall in love, but the relationship is never consummated as Kwai Chang, still a disciple in this flashback episode, did not lose his virginity until after he had left the monastery, as previously depicted in the second season. Nan Chi is mortally wounded while saving Kwai Chang's life. As she lies dying, she asks Caine to pretend with her that they are married and have a child. He says, "Only live, Nan Chi, and it will be true."

Caine takes employment from Ellie, a widowed ranch owner who does not feel that food and a place to sleep is enough compensation for all that Caine has done for her. Thus, Caine has sexual relations with her. In this third-season episode, "A Small Beheading", Ellie is played by Rosemary Forsyth.

== Teachers ==
- Master Chen Ming Kan: (Philip Ahn)
- Master Po: (Keye Luke)
- Master Sun: (Richard Loo)
- Master Teh: (John Leoning)
- Master Ling: (Victor Sen Yung)
- Master Ywang Kyu: (James Hong)
- Master Hake Tao: (Sam Hiona)
- Master Kwan Li: (James Shigeta)

== Known relatives ==
=== Kung Fu ===
- Father: Thomas Henry Caine (Bill Fletcher)
- Mother: Kwai Lin
- Half brother: Daniel "Danny" Caine (Tim McIntire)
- Uncle: American farmer
- Grandfather: Henry Rafael Caine (Dean Jagger)
- Grandmother: Elizabeth Hale Caine
- Nephew: Ezekiel "Zeke" Caine (John Blyth Barrymore)
- Cousin: Margit Kingsley McLean (Season Hubley)
- Cousin: John "Johnny" Kingsley McLean (Edward Albert)

=== Kung Fu: The Movie ===
- Son: Chung Wang (Brandon Lee)

=== Kung Fu: The Next Generation ===
- Great-grandson: Kwai Chang Caine (David Darlow)
- Great-great-grandson: Kwai Chang "Johnny" Caine (Brandon Lee). The youngest Caine in the family line wished to be known as "Johnny" to break the tradition of all the male descendants of the original Caine being named "Kwai Chang". His father is initially reluctant to do so, but eventually accepts his son's wishes.

=== Kung Fu: The Legend Continues ===
- Distant ancestor: Kwai Chang (the first of the line, 1500 years before the Old West time in which Kung Fu is set, about 350 AD)
- Son: Matthew Caine
- Grandson: Kwai Chang Caine
- Grandson: Damon Caine
- Grandson: Martin Bradshaw (half-brother of Kwai Chang Caine and Damon Caine)
- Great-grandson: Peter Caine (the last of the line; played as a boy by Nathaniel Moreau and Robert Bednarski, and as an adult by Chris Potter)

== Caine's name ==
The character was called Kwai Chang Caine in the Ed Spielman and Howard Friedlander's original feature movie script, and it was written that way in Caine's wanted poster that appeared in the series from the pilot onwards and until Kung Fu: The Movie.

However, in the third-season episode A Small Beheading, Captain Brandywine Gage (played by William Shatner) presents Caine with a scroll written in Chinese. As the camera pans down the scroll, the Chinese characters for Caine's name appear for the first time in the series:

| Chinese | English | Zhangzhou accented Amoy (POJ) | Mandarin (Pinyin) |
|---|---|---|---|
| 虔 | Caine | Khiân [kʰɪɛn] | Qián [tɕʰjɛ̌n] |
| 官 | Kwai | Koaiⁿ [kuaĩ] | Guān [kwán] |
| 昌 | Chang | chhiang [tɕʰiaŋ] | chāng [tʂʰɑ́ŋ] |

- note: in Chinese, the surname is written first

The Zhangzhou accented Amoy pronunciation of the characters most closely matches the English spelling of Caine's name. However, in the series, Caine attended the Shaolin Temple in Henan province, where the priests likely spoke Mandarin.

This discrepancy, caused by the series prop department, adds to the mistakes the series writers made regarding Chinese names in general and Caine's in particular. In episode s2e20 Arrogant Dragon, Caine talks with a man called Wu Chang:

I am Caine. In China, I am called Kwai Chang.
Of what province?
My mother's family is from Hebei province.
Then we are both Changs of Hebei. Five hundred years ago, we were of the same family

Suggesting that "Chang" was a sort of maternal family name, which is not a concept in Chinese surnames. On the other hand, in episode s3e20 The Brothers Caine, the first time Caine meets his brother Danny and this one has him at gunpoint, Caine explains:

If you cannot believe me, please listen. Our father was Thomas Henry Caine. Our grandfather was Henry Raphael Caine, a maker of stone images. Your mother was Elizabeth Chambers. My mother was Kwai Lin, a Chinese woman our father met on his travels in the East.

This time it is "Kwai" which appears as a maternal surname, contradicting both the other episode and Chinese usage. At any rate, both "Kwai" and "Chang" are Chinese names, and both have a presence as surnames.

== Spin-offs ==
- In 1986, Kung Fu: The Movie premiered as a made-for-TV movie. In reality, the movie was the pilot for a new series in which Caine finds himself hunted by the father of the royal nephew killed by Caine in the original pilot. The royal's primary weapon against Caine is a young man named Chung Wang, who is (unknowingly) Caine's adult son (played by Brandon Lee).
- In 1993, a new TV series begun, Kung Fu: The Legend Continues, wherein Carradine played the grandson of the original Caine. Identical in appearance to and named after the first Kwai Chang Caine, this Caine was reunited with his son from whom he was separated fifteen years previously (when each thought the other had died in an explosion). Raised by a Los Angeles policeman, the son is now a police detective who has long since abandoned his boyhood Shaolin training. This series ran for four seasons and 88 episodes. This show made no references to previous two TV movies and acts as an alternative sequel to the original series.
- David Carradine made one final appearance as Caine in The Gambler Returns: The Luck of the Draw, part of The Gambler telefilm series, which starred singer Kenny Rogers and was inspired by his hit song, "The Gambler". Luck of the Draw also featured the final appearance of Chuck Connors as Lucas McCain, Hugh O'Brian as Wyatt Earp, and Jack Kelly as Bart Maverick.
