= Legacy of Rage =

1986 Hong Kong film by Ronny Yu

- North American DVD cover

Chinese name
- Traditional Chinese: 龍在江湖
- Simplified Chinese: 龙在江湖
Transcriptions
Standard Mandarin
- Hanyu Pinyin: Lóng Zài Jiāng Hú
Yue: Cantonese
- Jyutping: Lung4 Zoi6 Gong1 Wu4
- Directed by: Ronny Yu
- Written by: Clifton Ko; Raymond Fung
- Produced by: John Shum; Linda Kuk
- Starring: Brandon Lee; Michael Wong; Regina Kent; Mang Hoi
- Cinematography: James Chan Hau-Ming
- Edited by: Wong Yee-shun
- Music by: Richard Yuen Cheuk-Fan
- Distributed by: D&B Films Company Ltd
- Release date: 20 December 1986
- Running time: 86 minutes
- Country: Hong Kong
- Language: Cantonese

Legacy of Rage (Chinese: 龍在江湖) is a 1986 Hong Kong action film directed by Ronny Yu. The film stars Brandon Lee, Michael Wong, Regina Kent, and a special appearance by Bolo Yeung, who appeared alongside Lee’s father Bruce Lee in his posthumous 1973 film Enter the Dragon. It was Lee's first leading film role and the only Hong Kong production he worked on.

The film follows an average Joe on a quest to save his girlfriend from a drug dealer, after being framed for the murder of a corrupt police officer.

== Plot ==
Brandon Ma (Brandon Lee) is a regular guy with a job and a girlfriend May (Regina Kent). He has two jobs, so he can support his girlfriend and his dream of owning a motorcycle. Brandon's best friend is Michael Wan (Michael Wong), an ambitious and murderous drug dealer. Michael also loves May and so he comes up with a plan using a corrupt police officer named Sharky (Lam Chung) that will win her for himself and get Brandon out of his way. It seems that the corrupt cop has been using his police connections to dominate the local cocaine trade, so Michael has him killed and uses Brandon as the fall guy. Brandon goes to jail and meets Hoi (Mang Hoi), although he thinks that he will be released soon thanks to the efforts of his good buddy Michael. However, after eight years, Brandon leaves from prison and vows revenge on Michael for betraying him and stealing his girlfriend.

Whilst out of prison he learns that May has had his son. With the help of Hoi, Brandon tracks down Michael. Whilst engaging his guards he learns that May is dead. After killing Michael's guards, Brandon confronts and kills his former friend Michael. Brandon says farewell to his friend Hoi (who aided him in fighting Michael's guards) and leaving with his son.

== Cast ==
- Brandon Lee as Brandon Ma
- Michael Wong as Michael Wan
- Regina Kent as May
- Mang Hoi as Four Eyes/Hoi
- Michael Chan as Yee
- Onno Boelee as Prisoner
- Tanya Lemani George as Rachel the Belly Dancer in Persian Restaurant
- Ku Feng as Prison Guard
- Bolo Yeung as Thug
- Teddy Yip Wing-cho as Mr. Yip
- Ken Lo as Michael's thug
- Blackie Ko as Michael's thug
- Ha Kwok-wing as U thug
- Ng Man-tat as Captain of the Guards
- Shing Fui-On -as Foo
- Stuart Smith as Big Papa
- Kirk Wong as Inspector Lau

== Release ==
The film was released in theatrically in Hong Kong on 20 December 1986.

In 1987, it was screened at the Cannes Film Festival and released in Japan. On May 16, The film got his cinematic release in the Philippines, under the title of Dragon Blood.

In the US the film was released directly to Home media in 1998 after the passing of Lee, its leading star.

== Reception ==
Upon its 1986 Hong Kong release Lee was nominated for a Hong Kong Film Award for Best New Performer in this role.

In 1987, it was a critical success at the Cannes Film Festival and commercial one in Japan.

At one point between its Hong Kong release and the 1992 making of Lee's first lead an American Studio film the action thriller Rapid Fire, producer Robert Lawrence screened Legacy of Rage and saw Lee's potential to be an action leading man in Hollywood, which led to their collaboration.

When the film was launched in 1998 in the US, the Hong Kong action film was described as a good genre film. In News-Press, film critic Randy Myers gave it three stars describing it as a stylish, but good early film. He added that aside from its flaws it was fast-paced, energetic, and Brandon showcased a lot of talent.

Paul Harris of The Age gave it two stars saying it gives a glimmer into the largely unexplored talent of actor Brandon Lee, but found it wasn't up to par with The Crow due to the formulaic plot.

Rob Lowing of The Sydney Morning Herald gave it three star, saying it had a generic story but praised Lee's good performance and Ronny Yu's stylish direction.

Producer Robert Lawrence was so impressed with Lee's performance in the film that he worked with Lee on developing Rapid Fire.
