= David Darlow (actor) =

American actor and theatre director

David Darlow (born 25 December 1943 in Jerusalem) is an American actor and stage director.

== Life ==
David Darlow was born in 1943 in Jerusalem. He grew up in Tel Aviv in his first years. Later he moved to the United States.

Darlow started his career at the theatre. In 1974 he directed the Off-Broadway play Demons: A Possession for the New York Playwrights Horizons. He predominantly was active as an actor and director in Chicago theatres such as the Goodman Theatre, the Chicago Shakespeare Theater under Remy Bumppo Theatre Company. He was nominated multiple times for the Jeff Award, as an actor as well as a director. In 2001 he won the award in the category Actor in a Supporting Role – Play for his role in Endgame. Darlow also was artistic director of the Oak Park Festival Theatre.

Since the mid-1970s Darlow also appeared in film and TV productions. He had minor roles in TV series such as Barney Miller, Barnaby Jones, Dallas, Buck Rogers in the 25th Century or Simon & Simon. Later he also appeared in feature films such as Miller's Crossing, The Fugitive, Road to Perdition, The Weather Man, Let's Go to Prison and No God, No Master.

Darlow was married to playwright and actress Kristine Thatcher from 1991 until 2003; in 1991 the couple adopted a daughter. Since 2006 he has been married to Rachel Silverman Darlow.

== Selected filmography ==
Actor

- 1976, 1979: Barney Miller (TV series, 2 episodes)
- 1977, 1979: Barnaby Jones (TV series, 3 episodes)
- 1977: The Hunted Lady (TV movie)
- 1978: The Runaways (TV series, 1 episode)
- 1979: Dallas (TV series, 1 episode)
- 1980: Buck Rogers in the 25th Century (TV series, 1 episode)
- 1981: Through the Magic Pyramid (TV movie)
- 1982: Simon & Simon (TV series, 1 episode)
- 1985: Born to Kill (TV movie)
- 1985: First Steps (TV movie)
- 1986: Street Hunter (TV movie)
- 1987: Kung Fu: The Next Generation (TV pilot)
- 1990: Miller's Crossing
- 1992: Legacy of Lies (TV movie)
- 1993: The Fugitive
- 1993: Missing Persons (TV series, 1 episode)
- 1993: The Untouchable (TV series, 1 episode)
- 1994: The Magic Door (TV series, 1 episode)
- 1997: Hoodlum
- 1999: Ride with the Devil
- 2000: Early Edition (TV series, 1 episode)
- 2000: High Fidelity
- 2002: Design
- 2002: Road to Perdition
- 2002: Unconditional Love
- 2002: Lana's Rain
- 2005: Phobic (short)
- 2005: The Weather Man
- 2005: Prison Break (TV series, 1 episode)
- 2006: Let's Go to Prison
- 2008: Eden Court
- 2008: Were the World Mine
- 2008: The Express: The Ernie Davis Story
- 2010: True Nature
- 2013: No God, No Master
- 2014, 2019: Chicago Fire (TV series, 2 episodes)
- 2015: Empire (TV series, 1 episode)
- 2024: The Emperor of Ocean Park (TV series, 5 episodes)

== Selected theatrography ==
Actor

- 1985: The Philanthropist (Court Theatre, Chicago)
- 1985: Arms and the Man (Court Theatre, Chicago)
- 1985: Every Good Boy Deserves Favor (Court Theatre, Chicago)
- 1985: The Real Thing (Northlight Theatre, Skokie)
- 1987: The Taming of the Shrew (Oak Park Festival Theatre, Oak Park)
- 1988: Doctor Faustus (Court Theatre, Chicago)
- 1988: The Merchant of Venice (Oak Park Festival Theatre, Oak Park)
- 1989: The Misanthrope (Goodman Theatre, Chicago)
- 1989: The Misanthrope (La Jolla Playhouse Mandell Weiss Theatre, La Jolla)
- 1991: Measure for Measure (Court Theatre, Chicago)
- 1995: Three Hotels (Rachel Silverman Productions, Ivanhoe Theater, Chicago)
- 1996: Rough for Theatre II (Buckets o' Beckett '96 Presented by The Splinter Group, Mercury Theater Chicago, Chicago)
- 1996: Emma's Child (Victory Gardens Greenhouse Theater Upstairs Mainstage, Chicago)
- 1997: The Tempest (First Folio Theatre, Oak Brook)
- 2004: Hidden Laughter (Remy Bumppo Theatre Company, Victory Gardens Greenhouse Theater Upstairs Mainstage, Chicago)
- 2005: Nathan the Wise (Chicago Festival of the Arts, Theatre Building Chicago, Chicago)
- 2006: The David Mamet Festival (Goodman Theatre, Chicago)
- 2006: A Life in the Theatre (Goodman Theatre, Albert Ivar Goodman Theatre, Chicago)
- 2006: The Best Man (Remy Bumppo Theatre Company, Victory Gardens Greenhouse, Chicago)
- 2007: Fiction (Remy Bumppo Theatre Company, Victory Gardens Greenhouse, Chicago)
- 2008: Othello (Chicago Shakespeare Theater, Courtyard Theater at Chicago Shakespeare Theater, Chicago)
- 2008: The Voysey Inheritance (Remy Bumppo Theatre Company, Victory Gardens Greenhouse, Chicago)
- 2009: Heroes (Remy Bumppo Theatre Company, Victory Gardens Greenhouse Theater Downstairs Mainstage, Chicago)
- 2010: Night and Day (Remy Bumppo Theatre Company, Victory Gardens Greenhouse Theater Upstairs Mainstage, Chicago)
- 2010–2011: The Importance of Being Earnest (Remy Bumppo Theatre Company, Victory Gardens Greenhouse Theater Upstairs Mainstage, Chicago)
- 2011: Mourning Becomes Electra (Remy Bumppo Theatre Company, Victory Gardens Greenhouse, Chicago)
- 2012: Camino Real (Goodman Theatre, Albert Ivar Goodman Theatre, Chicago)
- 2013: Julius Caesar (Chicago Shakespeare Theater, Courtyard Theater at Chicago Shakespeare Theater, Chicago)
- 2013: Henry VIII (Chicago Shakespeare Theater, Courtyard Theater at Chicago Shakespeare Theater, Chicago)
- 2014: Our Class (Remy Bumppo Theatre Company, The Greenhouse Theater Center, Chicago)
- 2014: Both Your Houses (Remy Bumppo Theatre Company, The Greenhouse Theater Center, Chicago)
- 2015: Love and Information (Remy Bumppo Theatre Company, The Greenhouse Theater Center, Chicago)
- 2016: Tug of War: Foreign Fire (Chicago Shakespeare Theater, Courtyard Theater at Chicago Shakespeare Theater, Chicago)
- 2016: Tug of War: Civil Strife (Chicago Shakespeare Theater, Courtyard Theater at Chicago Shakespeare Theater, Chicago)
- 2017: Pygmalion (Remy Bumppo Theatre Company, The Greenhouse Theater Center, Chicago)
- 2017: Uncle Vanya (Goodman Theatre, Owen Bruner Goodman Theatre, Chicago)
- 2017–2018: Puff: Believe It or Not (Remy Bumppo Theatre Company, The Greenhouse Theater Center, Chicago)
- 2018: An Enemy of the People (Goodman Theatre, Albert Ivar Goodman Theatre, Chicago)
- 2018: Indecent (Victory Gardens Theater, Victory Gardens Biograph Theatre Zacek-McVay Mainstage, Chicago)
- 2019: The Father (Remy Bumppo Theatre Company, Theater Wit, Chicago)
- 2019: If I Forget (Victory Gardens Theater, Victory Gardens Biograph Theatre Zacek-McVay Mainstage, Chicago)

Director

- 1974–1975: Demons: A Possession (Playwrights Horizons, New York City)
- 1983: The Tempest (Oak Park Festival Theatre, Oak Park)
- 1986: The Comedy of Errors (Oak Park Festival Theatre, Oak Park)
- 1987: Angel Street (Court Theatre, Chicago)
- 1987: The Taming of the Shrew (Oak Park Festival Theatre, Oak Park)
- 1988: The Merchant of Venice (Oak Park Festival Theatre, Oak Park)
- 2007: Mrs. Warren's Profession (Remy Bumppo Theatre Company, Chicago)
- 2009: As You Like It (Utah Shakespeare Festival)
- 2010: Les Liaisons Dangereuses (Remy Bumppo Theatre Company, Victory Gardens Greenhouse Theater Upstairs Mainstage, Chicago)
- 2013–2014: An Inspector Calls (Remy Bumppo Theatre Company, Greenhouse Theater Center Upstairs Mainstage, Chicago)
- 2017: Born Yesterday (Remy Bumppo Theatre Company, Greenhouse Theater Center Upstairs Mainstage, Chicago)

== Awards and nominations ==
- 1985: Nomination for the Jeff Award in the category Actor in a Principal Role – Play for his role in The Philanthropist at Court Theatre
- 1986: Nomination for the Jeff Award in the category Actor in a Principal Role – Play for his role in The Real Thing at Northlight Theatre
- 2001: Winner of the Jeff Award as Actor in a Supporting Role – Play for his role in Endgame with the American Theater Company
- 2006: Nomination for the Jeff Award in the category Actor in a Principal Role – Play for his role in Power with the Remy Bumppo Theatre Company
- 2017: Nomination for the Jeff Award in the category Director – Play für seine Inszenierung von Born Yesterday with the Remy Bumppo Theatre Company
- 2019: Nomination for the Jeff Award in the category Performer in a Principal Role – Play for his role as André in The Father
