= Script coverage =

Filmmaking term

Script coverage is a filmmaking term for the analysis and grading of screenplays, often within the "script development" department of a production company. It usually takes the form of a written report, guided by a rubric that varies from company to company. Criteria include, but are not limited to:

- Identification: Title, Author, Type of Material, Locale, Genre
- Logline: A one sentence summary
- Comment summary: A paragraph summary of the analysis
- Grade: Excellent, Good, Fair, Poor for categories that include characterization, premise, storyline, production values, dialogue and more
- Synopsis: Summary of plot: 1–3 pages depending on script quality
- Budget: The script reader's estimated budget
- Analysis

== Script timeline ==
Script coverage is the summary and analysis of a script's plot and writing quality, used by production companies to track film and TV screenplays. Coverage consists of a number of elements. The first is a 1-to-2-page synopsis of the script's story highlighting the main characters and events of the tale. The second is a subjective review of the piece (typical length of which could range anywhere from 1 sentence, in short-form contest coverage, to 2 or 3 pages) which assesses the effectiveness of the screenplay's various components—including its concept, story structure, story development, characters, dialogue, and writing style—and points out its strong points and problem areas. The evaluation ends with a recommendation from the analyst as to what he/she feels the production entity should do with the script. This recommendation usually employs 1 of 3 terms:

- Pass: The reader feels the script fails to make the grade in most areas and that the production entity should not proceed with it.
- Consider: The reader feels the script has a considerable number of strong points and is good enough to proceed with, while acknowledging that it has a number of significant problems that need to be successfully solved before the piece can be considered suitable for production.
- Recommend: The reader feels the script is extremely strong in all respects and that the production entity should proceed with it without reservation.

When completed, the synopsis, review, and evaluation are assembled and fronted with a cover page that lists the script's vital information (author's name, story genre, time and locations in which it takes place, length of the script, etc.) and contains a brief summary of the story and the review. The cover page usually includes a checklist in which the script's various aspects are rated on a scale ranging from poor to excellent. Finally, the cover page highlights the analyst's ultimate recommendation. Although script coverage is a tool used primarily by motion picture production entities, it is sometimes used by screenwriting competitions as a way of separating "wheat from chaff." The coverage done for script competitions is usually simpler than that done for production companies — substituting a logline (a brief 1 or 2 line summary of the story) for the synopsis and simplifying the assessment — often employing only the checklist rating of the script's various aspects.

In addition to production entities and screenwriting competitions, a number of independent services employ a roster of veteran script analysts to provide professional-level coverage for screenwriters who wish to see how their scripts will be received by the industry. This gives the writers a chance to identify and resolve problems before submitting them to production entities.

In recent years, several LLM-based script coverage services have opened.

== Issues in coverage ==
=== Economy of the script ===
By the very nature of summarizing a complicated plot, the coverage will not include every plot twist and subplot. Some characters will be omitted, or only briefly introduced for the sake of brevity. In order to decide on what will stay and what will go, the character and actions must support the main plot, and ultimately the premise of the story. Scripts that are not economical and include peripheral characters, scenes, and storylines that do not support character or plot development do not affect their motivation, and therefore can be omitted from the coverage. In this manner, well-written scripts may have longer synopses than poorly written scripts with a lot of extraneous action.
