= List of Hong Kong films of 1950 =

A list of films produced in Hong Kong in 1950:

== 1950 ==
Title	Director	Cast	Genre	Notes
1950
A Chivalrous Bandit	Chan Pei	Mak Bing-Wing, Chow Kwun-Ling, Ho Chung-Fong, Ha Bo-Lin, Leung Siu-Mui, Gam Lau	Martial Arts, Cantonese opera	
A White Python Usurps the Dragon's Palace	But Fu	Chun Siu-Lei, Leung Siu-Mui	Historical Drama Fantasy	
The Abandoned Woman of a Rich Family (aka Hao men qi fu)				
The Awful Truth (aka Shuo huang shi jie)				
The Battle Between Demon Girl and the Ox Devil	But Fu	Chun Siu-Lei, Lam Kar-Yee, Lee Yuet-Ching	Fantasy	
Bird on the Wing (aka Ling xiao gu yan)				
Black Market Marriage	Ng Wui	Sheung Hoi-Mui, Yu Lai-Zhen, Tong Sing-To, Chan Lap-Ban	Drama	
Blood, Rouge and Tears	Law Chi-Hung	Lo Ban-Chiu, Siu Yin-Fei, Chan Lo-Wah, Chan Lap-Ban	Drama	
Devil's Family	Mok Hong-See	Pak Wan, Tsi Law-Lin, Hung Cheuk, Leung Siu-Mui, Ma Siu-Ying, To Sam-Ku, Leung Sek-Man, Yang Jiang, Leung Suk-Hing	Historical Drama	
The Flower Drops by the Red Chamber (Hua luo hong lou)				
The Flower Street (Hua jie)				
The Flying Sword Hero from Emei Mountain				
The Flying Swordsman's Bloody Battle at Zhou Village (aka Fei jian xia xie zhan Zhou gu zhuang)				
The Girl Minstrel (aka Tian ya ge nu)				
The Kid (aka Xi lu xiang, Sai lo cheung)	Fung Fung	Bruce Lee, Lee Hoi-chuen, Chan Lap-Ban, Grace Ding Ning	Drama	
Lust of a Grand Lady	Mok Hong-See	Ma Sze-Tsang, Hung Sin Nui, Man Kok-Fei, Leung Sing-Bo, Chan Wai-Yue, Chan Lap-Ban	Musical	
Magic of Tiger Dragon	Cheung Oi-Man	Chun Siu-Lei, Law Kar-Kuen, Lam Kwan-Sam, Lam Kar-Yee, To Sam-Ku	Fantasy. Cantonese opera	
Monk in Love	Wong Toi	Pak Yin, Ho Fei-Fan, Fung Wong-Nui, Yip Ping, Mok Fung	Drama	Film debut for Fung Wong-Nui.
Daisen qi an How Inspector Daisen Shattered the Strange Cloaks Gang				
Emei fei jian xia xia ji The Flying Sword Hero from Emei Mountain II				
Hei tian tang Dark Paradise				
The Story of Xiaowan Dong				
Three Girl Musketeers (Nu san jian xia)				
Wild Flowers Are Sweeters	Hung Suk-Wan	Ma Sze-Tsang, Hung Sin Nui, Yee Chau-Sui, Yung Yuk-Yi, Chan Lap-Ban	Comedy	
Xi lu xiang				
The Haunted House				Gui wu
Emei fei jian xia da po qing luo gu Flying Swordsman of Emei Wins the Battle in Green Snails Valley				
Emei fei jian xia Yi dai yao ji	Pingqian Li	Guang Bai	Drama	
Jin suo ji The Golden Chain				
Hua he shang da nao Wutai shan Rude Monk's Intrusion Into Wutai Mountain				
Shen xia jin luo han Magnificent Hero Jin Luohan				
Ren hai wan hua tong Kaleidoscope				
Wu long jiang jun				
Zui e suo lian shang ji				
Zui e suo lian xia ji				
Jiang hu qi xia Strange Hero				
Leng luo duan chang hua Sorrows of a Neglected Wife				
Qian li song ji mao A Small Gift From Afar				
Fang Shiyu fu zi bao xie chou				
Fan gong qing lei Love Tears of a Buddhist Recluse				
Da dao Wang Wu zue zhan xiao ba wang Big Sword Wang Wu				
Jie hou gu er The War Baby				
Jie hun 24 xiao shi 24 Hours of Marriage				
Er xin sui mu xin The Son Who Broke Mother's Heart				
Wan jie qing yuan Loves Caught in 10,000 Perils				
Nian wan qian The End of the Year Means Money				
Nanhai yu ge The Nanhai Fisherman's Song				
Nan lai yan				
