= Datong Film Company =

Datong Film Company (Chinese: 大同影片公司) was a film company in the 1940s. Datong Film Company was also founded by producer and filmmaker Zhang Shichuan. Shichuan was also the creator of Dadi Film Company (Chinese: 北京大地時代文化傳播有限公司). Datong Film Company only made eight movies. Datong Film Company has made a film called The Kid (1950), which starred Bruce Lee as Kid Cheung and Lee Hoi-chuen as Hung Pak Ho. Datong Film Company was defunct in 1953.

== Career ==
Datong Film Company start making films in 1948. The name of the first film is called The Broken Dream (1948). Datong Film Company was discovered and made by Zhang Shichuan. Shichuan decided to make a lot of films, but he did not, he only made eight films in the company. The company had made a film of kid called The Kid, which starred Bruce Lee as Kid Cheung and his dad Lee Hoi-chuen as Hung Pak Ho. The company was defunct in 1953 since Zhang Shichuan died.

== Filmography ==
- The Broken Dream (1948)
- The Kid (1950)
- The Girl and the Chivalrous Bandit (1950)
- A Young Lady Sells Her Maid (1951)
- The Flower Girl (1952)
- Song of Courtship (1952)
- Green Window, Red Tears (1952)
- Stage-fans' Sweetheart (1952)
