= Bruce Lee, My Brother =

2010 Hong Kong film by Raymond Yip

Chinese name
- Traditional Chinese: 李小龍
- Simplified Chinese: 李小龙
Transcriptions
Standard Mandarin
- Hanyu Pinyin: Lǐ Xiǎolóng
Yue: Cantonese
- Jyutping: Lei5 Siu2 Lung4
- Directed by: Raymond Yip; Manfred Wong
- Screenplay by: Manfred Wong; Lau Ho-leung
- Story by: Robert Lee
- Produced by: Robert Lee; Manfred Wong; Lorraine Ho
- Starring: Tony Leung; Christy Chung; Aarif Rahman
- Narrated by: Robert Lee
- Cinematography: Jason Kwan
- Edited by: Azrael Chung; Shirley Yip
- Music by: Chan Kwong-wing
- Production companies: Media Asia Films; Shanghai TV Media; Beijing Antaeus Film; Beijing Meng Ze Culture & Media; J' Star Group; Masterpiece Films
- Distributed by: Media Asia Distributions
- Release date: 25 November 2010
- Running time: 129 minutes
- Country: Hong Kong
- Language: Cantonese
- Budget: $4.5 million

Bruce Lee, My Brother (Chinese: 李小龍, also known in the United Kingdom as Young Bruce Lee) is a 2010 Hong Kong biographical martial arts film directed by Raymond Yip, written, produced, and directed by Manfred Wong from a story by Bruce Lee's real life younger brother Robert Lee, who also produced and narrated the film. The film stars Aarif Rahman as Lee, Tony Leung Ka-fai and Christy Chung as Lee's parents, the film is based on the life of Bruce Lee in his teenage years to part of his adult years.

== Plot ==
Bruce Lee, My Brother is a dramatic biopic of the eponymous martial arts legend as told by his younger brother, Robert Lee. Based directly from the book "Memories of Lee Siu-loong", which is authored by Lee's siblings (Phoebe, Robert, Agnes and Peter), it revolves around Bruce Lee's life as a rebellious adolescent in Hong Kong before he sets off for the USA and conquers the world at the age of 18 with only US$102 in his pocket.

As a young man, Bruce grew up in an affluent family. Entering the film industry at an early age, he gained fame as a child actor. Outside the home and studio, he was rebellious; he spent time engaging in street fights, dancing with lady friends, and hanging with his buddies, Kong and Unicorn, the latter a fellow child actor who later appeared in Fist of Fury and The Way of the Dragon. Invincible as he is as a street fighter, Bruce's romantic escapades are not as smooth and successful. He is head-over-heels in love with Pearl, only to realize his mate Kong shares the same passion. At a cha-cha dancing tournament, Kong tells Bruce his intentions of leaving Pearl so Bruce himself can have her, damaging their friendship. Bruce is unable to come to terms with Kong.

Against his father's wishes, Bruce studies the Wing Chun martial arts style instead of tai chi and tastes his first public triumph at a tournament with his kung fu skills against a boxer, who immediately seeks a rematch. Tasting victory again, Bruce learns from his opponent that Kong has become a drug addict and infiltrates the drug lord's den together with Unicorn to rescue Kong, but the drug dealers confront them. Their actions lead to a long chase; although Bruce and his friends survive, Kong later dies trying to save his friends. Bruce himself becomes the target of both the Triads and corrupted cops who want him in jail. To save his life, Bruce's father has no choice but to send him off to San Francisco, California.

== Cast ==
- Aarif Rahman as Bruce Lee
- Tony Leung Ka-fai as Lee Hoi-chuen
- Christy Chung as Grace Ho
- Jennifer Tse as Cho Man-yee (Pearl Tso)
- Michelle Ye as Lee Hap-ngan (Eight Sister), Bruce Lee's aunt
- Jin Au-yeung as Unicorn Chan/Sloppy Cat
- Tan Hanjin as Skinny
- Angela Gong Mi as Leung Man-lan (Margaret Leung)
- Zhang Yishan as Lau Kin-kong
- Wilfred Lau as Ngai
- Lee Heung-kam as Bruce Lee's grandmother
- Cheung Tat-ming as Fung Fung
- Cheung Siu-fai as Cho Tat-wah
- Johnson Yuen as Leung Sing-Bor
- Alex Yen as Charlie Owen
- Dada Lo as Phoebe Lee
- Leanne Ho as Agnes Lee
- Charles Ying as Peter Lee
- Dylan Sterling as Robert Lee
- Wong Chi-Wai as Ip Man

== Accolades ==
Accolades
Ceremony	Category	Recipient	Outcome
30th Hong Kong Film Awards	Best Actor	Tony Leung Ka-fai	Nominated
30th Hong Kong Film Awards	Best New Performer	Hanjin Tang	Won
