= Peter Lee Jung-sum =

Hong Kong meteorologist (1939–2008)

Peter Lee
- 李忠琛
- Born: Lee Jung-sum; 23 October 1939; British Hong Kong
- Died: 3 September 2008 (aged 68); Melbourne, Australia
- Other name: Peter Li Chung-sum
- Education: La Salle College; University of Minnesota; University of Hong Kong (PhD)
- Occupations: meteorologist, electrical engineer
- Employer: Hong Kong Observatory (former)
- Spouses: Eunice Lam (m. 1966; div. 1971) Mary Cheung (m. 1980; div. 1995)
- Children: 3
- Parents: Lee Hoi-chuen (father); Grace Ho (mother)
- Family: Bruce Lee (brother); Robert Lee Jun-fai (brother); Brandon Lee (nephew); Shannon Lee (niece)
- Sports career
- Country: Hong Kong
- Sport: Fencing
- Event: 1958 British Empire and Commonwealth Games
- College team: La Salle Fencing Team

Chinese name
- Chinese: 李忠琛
Transcriptions
Standard Mandarin
- Hanyu Pinyin: Lǐ Zhōngchēn
Yue: Cantonese
- Jyutping: lei^{5} zung^{1}-sam^{1}

Peter Lee Jung-sum (23 October 1939 – 3 September 2008), was a former assistant director of Hong Kong Observatory. He was the elder brother of Bruce Lee.

== Background ==
Born in Hong Kong on 23 October 1939, Lee was the eldest son of Lee Hoi-chuen and Grace Ho. He attended the La Salle College where he excelled in his studies and sports. He started fencing and influenced his brother Bruce to take up fencing lessons with him when Bruce was around 11 to 14.

Lee was a world-class fencer and in March 1958 won the championship in the first Inter-School Fencing Competition. In July 1958, he joined José Marçal, Pedro Marçal, Reuben Lynn, and Hung Hak-yau on the Hong Kong fencing team for the 1958 British Empire and Commonwealth Games. He won in round 1 but did not reach the quarter-finals, while Hung became a finalist in the individual foil event.

In May 1959, Lee joined Bruce in Seattle for a short stay and proceeded to Minnesota to further his studies. He later graduated from the University of Minnesota and returned to Hong Kong. In 1983, Lee completed his PhD at the Department of Electrical Engineering at the University of Hong Kong. The title of his doctoral thesis was "A ground clutter processor for the Royal Observatory's 10-cm meteorological radar".

In the 1960s, Lee taught for a while at La Salle College and joined the Royal Observatory Hong Kong as its assistant director, where he contributed significantly to the technical development of the observatory's detection of tropical cyclones. He was also the coach of the La Salle Fencing Team beginning 1968, with eleven Inter-School Fencing Championship wins in thirteen years.

== Personal life ==
Lee's younger brothers are martial artist and actor Bruce Lee and musician Robert Lee. Through the marriage of Bruce and Linda Lee Cadwell, he was the uncle of American actors Brandon Lee and Shannon Lee.

Lee married Eunice Lam in 1966, and had a son Lee Hoi-ho (李凱豪). Lee and Lam divorced in 1971 due to personality differences. He later earned a PhD from the University of Hong Kong. In 1980 he married Miss Hong Kong 1975 winner Mary Cheung, and they had a son Lee Wai-ho (李偉豪) and a daughter Lee Yuk-yee (李珏頤). Lee and Cheung divorced in 1995.

== Death ==
Upon his retirement, Lee moved his family first to New Zealand, and later to Melbourne, Australia. He died of a heart attack in his home on 3 September 2008. Lee was cremated and his ashes were brought back to Hong Kong.

== Portrayals ==
Lee was portrayed by Wang Gongyi in the 2008 television series The Legend of Bruce Lee.

The adult Lee was portrayed by Hong Kong singer Charles Ying, and ten-year-old Peter was portrayed by the child actor Wei Zi-li in the 2010 Hong Kong film Bruce Lee, My Brother.
