= Eunice Lam =

Hong Kong writer (1943–2018)

- 林燕妮
- Born: 31 January 1943; Japanese Hong Kong
- Died: 31 May 2018 (aged 75); Hong Kong Sanatorium & Hospital, Happy Valley, Hong Kong
- Other names: Lam Yin-nei, Lin Yanni
- Education: University of California, Berkeley; University of Hong Kong
- Occupations: Novelist, columnist, businesswoman
- Years active: 1974–2018
- Spouse: Peter Lee Jung-sum (m. 1966; div. 1971)
- Partner(s): James Wong Jim (1976–1990)
- Children: 1
- Relatives: Richard Lam (brother)

Chinese name
- Chinese: 林燕妮
Transcriptions
Standard Mandarin
- Hanyu Pinyin: Lín Yànní
- Wade–Giles: Lin Yen-ni
Yue: Cantonese
- Jyutping: Lam^{4} Jin^{1} Nei^{4}

Eunice Lam Yin-nei (Chinese: 林燕妮; 31 January 1943 – 31 May 2018), also known as Lin Yanni, was a Hong Kong novelist, columnist, businesswoman, and socialite, often called the "prodigal daughter" of Hong Kong. She published more than eighty books, many of which have been adapted into films. She also wrote regular columns for the Ming Pao, and Jin Yong, the famous writer who founded the newspaper, praised her as the "best modern woman essayist".

Lam was married to Peter Lee, brother of the kung-fu star Bruce Lee. Her brother Richard Lam was also a well-known Cantopop lyricist. Her lengthy extra-marital relationship with the celebrated songwriter Wong Jim garnered her media attention.

== Early life and education ==
Lam was born in Hong Kong on 31 January 1943 into an artistic and literary family. She had a younger sister and two younger brothers, including the Cantopop lyricist Richard Lam Chun-keung, a household name in Hong Kong.

At age 17, she was admitted to the University of California, Berkeley in the United States. She returned to Hong Kong after graduating with a bachelor's degree in genetics, and later earned two master's degrees, including one in Chinese literature from the University of Hong Kong.

== Career ==
Lam worked as one of Hong Kong's first television weather girls. She began her writing career in 1974, and became a prolific writer in the 1980s. She published more than eighty books, including Crazy (癡), Fate (缘), Alliance (盟) and The Burial of Youth (青春之葬). Many of her novels have been adapted into films. She was also a regular columnist for the Chinese-language newspapers Ming Pao and the Hong Kong Daily News, praised by Jin Yong as the "best modern woman essayist".

== Personal life ==
When she was 21, Lam married Peter Lee Jung-sum, the elder brother of Bruce Lee, and the couple had a son, Lee Kai-ho (李凯豪). The marriage ended in divorce after about five years. Lam found herself in the media spotlight for having maintained a 14-year extra-marital relationship with Wong Jim, the celebrated Hong Kong songwriter, which began in 1976 when they were both working for the broadcaster TVB; the affair caused the break-up of his first marriage. Together, they started the advertising agency Wong & Lam; it was later bought by Saatchi & Saatchi. The couple planned to marry in 1988, but, according to Lam, Wong lost interest, and they broke up after Wong started an affair with his secretary, whom he later married.

== Death ==
Lam was diagnosed with lung cancer due to her excessive smoking in 2016. On 31 May 2018, she died from the disease at Hong Kong Sanatorium & Hospital, aged 75. Her three siblings, including Richard, had all died of lymphoma. She continued writing throughout her illness; her last column was published in Ming Pao on 6 June 2018.
