= Grace Ho =

Mother of Bruce Lee

- 何愛瑜
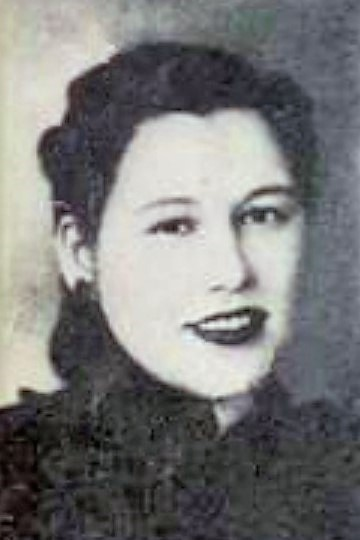
- Ho in the 1940s
- Born: Bai Rong; 1907 (bef. 24 June); Shanghai, China
- Died: 24 June 1996 (aged 89); Los Angeles, California, U.S.
- Other names: He Aiyu, He Bairong
- Spouse: Lee Hoi-chuen
- Children: 5, including Peter, Bruce, and Robert
- Relatives: Robert Hotung (uncle); Brandon Lee (grandson); Shannon Lee (granddaughter)

Chinese name
- Traditional Chinese: 何愛瑜
- Simplified Chinese: 何爱瑜
Transcriptions
Standard Mandarin
- Hanyu Pinyin: Hé Àiyú
Yue: Cantonese
- Jyutping: Ho^{4} Oi^{3}-jyu^{4}
- IPA: [hɔ˩ ɔj˧.jy˩]

Grace Ho (Chinese: 何愛瑜; 1907 – 24 June 1996) was the mother of Bruce Lee. Besides Bruce, she and her husband Lee Hoi-chuen were the parents of Peter Lee, Robert Lee, Phoebe Lee, and Agnes Lee. Grace Ho is believed to have been a devout Catholic Christian, while her husband Lee Hoi-chuen was a Buddhist.

== Biography ==
Grace Ho was born Bai Rong in 1907 in Shanghai to mother Cheung King-sin (張瓊仙), a mixed-race Eurasian woman who was a mistress of Ho Kam Tong (何甘棠), a prominent businessman who had 12 wives and reportedly more than 30 children. Ho Kom-tong was the younger, maternal half-brother of Hong Kong businessman and philanthropist Robert Hotung. Ho eventually adopted Grace.

The ethnicity of Grace Ho's parents is somewhat uncertain. The most popular assertion is that Grace Ho's father was German and her mother was Chinese, as attested by biographers Robert Clouse, Bruce Thomas, and Ho's daughter-in-law Linda Lee Cadwell. It is also stated that Grace Ho's father was raised as the son of a Dutch Jew, Charles Maurice Bosman, and his Chinese concubine. However, according to Russo, there are doubts about whether Charles Bosman was the actual father of Ho Kom-tong. Charles Russo has questioned this origin story entirely, suggesting that Grace Ho's father might have been Chinese or mixed-Chinese, and that her mother was English. Matthew Polly concedes that Grace Ho's paternal grandfather was a Dutch Jew, but likewise asserts that her mother was English. However, according to Doug Palmer, the claim that Grace Ho had an English mother is only speculation. Palmer also notes that family records suggest that the Dutch-Jewish Bosman family had originated from Germany, which may explain why it was assumed that Grace had German origins.

Grace spent part of her childhood in Hong Kong, living at the Ho Tung Gardens in the Peak under the care of Clara Ho Tung, her aunt. Grace later fell in love with her husband-to-be Lee Hoi-chuen (李海泉) from her admiration of his stage art. Grace traveled with Lee in San Francisco on his one-year US tour with the Mandarin Theatre in 1939. Grace reported to the US government in 1939 that her mother was English; when Grace returned to Hong Kong during the Japanese occupation of Hong Kong, she reported that her mother was German because Germany was an ally of Japan at that time. During this tour, Grace gave birth to her fourth child Bruce Lee; Lee Hoi-chuen was performing in New York City at the time of Bruce's birth. Grace's family would all return to Hong Kong in the spring of 1941 only to be stuck there during the Japanese occupation from 1941 to 1945.

Grace's three sons would go on to be very successful. Peter Lee, Grace's oldest son, excelled in fencing and meteorology, becoming assistant director of the Hong Kong Observatory. Bruce Lee would become famous in Hollywood and Hong Kong for his films and skill in martial arts, and Robert Lee would become a popular Hong Kong and Macau musician founding the band called the Thunderbirds.

== Depictions in media ==
Unlike most of her children, Grace was hardly ever seen in the media or on television. Her only appearance on television was with her son Robert in an interview on Good Night America with Geraldo Rivera, shortly after Bruce's death.
