= Ban Ban =

Hong Kong actress and singer

- 斑斑
- Born: Lai Siu-man (黎小雯); 23 June 1953 (age 73); British Hong Kong
- Other name: Betty Lai
- Occupations: Singer; actress
- Years active: 1966–2000
- Agents: TVB (1973–1983); ATV (1983–2000)
- Spouse: Austin Wai (m. 1996; div. 2001)
- Children: Clinton Wai (son)
- Family: Sylvia Lai (sister)
- Musical career
- Also known as: Bun Bun; Ban Ban
- Origin: British Hong Kong
- Genres: Cantopop; Mandopop
- Member of: Sum Sum Ban Ban
- Formerly of: BumbleBees
- Website: 森森 & 斑斑 on Facebook

Chinese name
- Chinese: 斑斑
Transcriptions
Standard Mandarin
- Hanyu Pinyin: Bān bān

Bun Bun
- Chinese: 彬彬
Transcriptions
Standard Mandarin
- Hanyu Pinyin: Bīn Bīn

Betty Lai Siu-man
- Chinese: 黎小雯
Transcriptions
Standard Mandarin
- Hanyu Pinyin: Lí Xiǎobīn

Betty Lai Siu-man (born 23 June 1953), also known by her stage name Ban Ban and previously as Bun Bun, is a semi retired Hong Kong actress and singer.

== Background ==
Lai was born in Hong Kong on 23 June 1953. She is of Meixian ancestry. Her elder sister is Sylvia Lai Sui-pun.

In 1966, Lai, her elder sister, and the other four male singers formed a musical band named BumbleBee to promote their traffic and road safety song in Hong Kong.

In 1967, She took the stage name previously as Bun Bun (彬彬), but soon changed to Ban Ban (斑斑), while her sister took the stage name of Sum Sum (森森).

In 1972, Ban Ban and Sum Sum formed a musical duo called Sum Sum Ban Ban (森森斑斑), and both hosted in the variety show Enjoy Yourself Tonight (歡樂今宵) in 1973. In 1979, they released their first studio album Star, Moon, Sun (星星.月亮.冇太陽).

In 1983, Ban Ban gained her first acting role in the TVB wuxia drama The Legend of the Condor Heroes, gaining her some fame to receive future acting and hosting roles. She and Sum Sum left TVB to join ATV to further pursuit their acting and singing careers.

In 1985, she was invited by CCTV to host its New Year's Gala.

Ban Ban was married to actor Austin Wai in 1996, and they have a son, Clinton Wai Kin-ho (惠建豪).

She starred her last role in Forever Love Song (曲終情未了) before leaving the entertainment industry in 2000. Lai and Wai divorced in the following year and her son left with her. She allowed her son to be filial to his father.

In October 2012, Lai was notified of her ex-husband Wai's death; she signed in grief and said life is unpredictable.

She later starred in her minor role as Madam Shen (沈夫人) in the 2015 Chinese television drama Fu Rong Jin (芙蓉錦).
