= Alice Fung So-bor =

Hong Kong actress (born 1944)

Fung in 2024

Alice Fung So-bor (Chinese: 馮素波; born August 7, 1944), also known as 波姐 (lit. Sister Bor), is a Hong Kong actress. She is an actress of ViuTV and has worked for Asia Television (ATV), TVB, and Hong Kong Television Network (HKTV). When she was 5 years old, she was arranged by her father, director Fung Fung (馮峰), to act in the film The Kid.

== Early life ==
Fung is born into a family of performing arts. Her father Feng Feng was a Cantonese film actor and director in the 1960s. She has 10 siblings. Her ninth half sister, Petrina Fung Bo-bo (馮寶寶), is a famous Hong Kong actress. Her seventh half brother, Fung Hak-on (馮克安), was a Kung Fu film actor and martial arts instructor in the 1970s and 1980s. Her sixth half brother, Fung Chi-on (馮志安), who does business in Indonesia, was convicted of forgery and fraud. Her eighth half brother, Fung Kit-lung (馮吉隆), was a former TVB senior executive. Her eleventh half brother, Fung Kwok-on (馮國安) is former Chief Superintendent of the Hong Kong Police Force. As Fung had been in and out of film sets since childhood, she had known the late actors Charlie Chaplin of the East (東方差利) Chau-shui Yee (伊秋水) and Clark Gable of Hong Kong (香港奇勒基寶) Billy Fung (馮應湘). (Note: 關於馮素波名字來源、早年生活、出生地和籍貫的資料來自香港電台第二台廣播節目《守下留情》於2015年7月13日播出的馮素波訪問。)

She was born in So Bor Lane (素波巷; Mandarin: Su Bo Xiang) of Go Dai Street (高第街, Mandarin: Gao Di Jie), Canton (廣州; Kwangchow; Mandarin: Guangzhou), and later went to Hong Kong to attend the Kit Ling Kindergarten (潔瑩幼稚園), which was opened by her aunt and her friends on the ground floor of 369 Prince Edward Road. At the age of seven, in 1951, she started attending primary one at Wing Hong Middle School Affiliated Primary School (永康中學附屬小學) which was located at Wing Hong Yuen, Sheung Yuen Leng Village (上元嶺村), opposite Tai Hom Village (大磡村) in Diamond Hill. Later, she attended Tack Ching Primary School (德貞小學) in Sham Shui Po, Primary School Section of Southwest Middle School (西南中學小學部) in Bonham Road, Hoi Ming School (凱銘學校) at 506-508 Queen's Road West, Sik Kwong School on Kam Hong Street (琴行街), near King's Road, Hong Kong Pui To Primary School (Primary 5) and Guangzhou Zhibaoqiao No. 5 Central Primary School (廣州至寶橋五中心小學). In the 1950s, she studied at Guangzhou No. 29 Middle School (廣州市第二十九中學), which was renamed as Sai Kwan Pui Ying Middle School (西關培英中學), located in Liwan District, Guangzhou. In 1959, she returned to Hong Kong with her father and settled in the Studio Hotel (影城酒店) on Prince Edward Road in Kowloon City. Due to the political turmoil before and after the Cultural Revolution, she did not return to Guangzhou to complete her studies.

Her name "Fung So Bor" was named after So Bor Lane in Guangzhou; a maternity home located there was her birthplace. When she was a child, she liked to act as a Cantonese opera performer and could also sing Cantonese opera songs. In 1964, at the suggestion of her mother Cheung Syut Ying (張雪英), Alice and six other child actresses (童星), Josephine Siao Fong-fong (蕭芳芳), Connie Chan Po-chu (陳寶珠), Petrina Fung Bo-bo (馮寶寶), Nancy Sit Ka-yin (薛家燕), Felicia Wong (王愛明) and Sum Chi-wah (沈芝華) became sworn sisters as the "Seven Princesses" (七公主). Fung was the eldest among them. Fung met Bruce Lee when she was a child, and the two became friends because they lived in a dormitory near the Diamond Hill Studios. (Note: 關於馮素波認識李小龍、與李小龍相處和來港生活時的住處的資料來自香港電台第二台廣播節目《守下留情》於2015年7月14日播出的馮素波訪問。) At that time, Li went with her to play in the fields. Fung subsequently lost contact with him until they met again at a party shortly after he returned from studying in the United States.

Regarding her place of residence, Fung was born in China, but was brought to Hong Kong by one of her father's wives, Cheung Syut Ying, to escape the Chinese Civil War between the Kuomintang-led Nationalist government and the Chinese Communist Army. Her family moved frequently. In 1949, she lived in a three-storey building on Junction Road in Kowloon City, Kowloon. She then moved to a tin house at no. 123 Pak Tai Street (北帝街), Sung Wong Toi, To Kwa Wan, a stone house near the Grandview Film Studio (大觀片場) in Tai Hom Village, Diamond Hill, a cubicle room (a room partitioned by wooden or fibre boards) in the Hill Road Market, Shek Tong Tsui and a tenement building on Marble Road in North Point. In 1954, she moved to Ma Tau Kok Road.

== Career ==
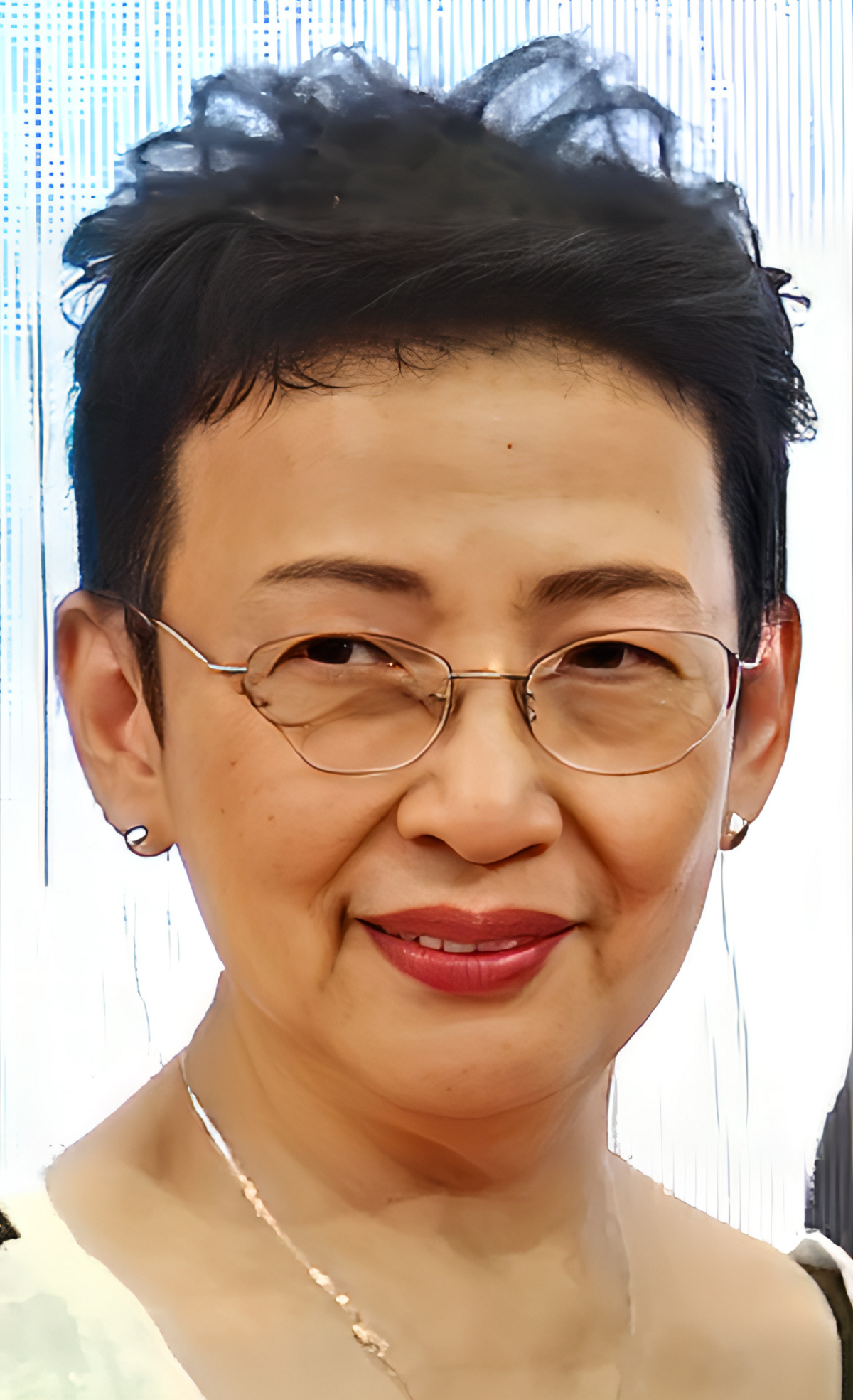
Fung attended the press conference for the Tung Wah Group of Hospitals charity premiere of the stage play Fortuitousness: Xu Zhimo (偶然·徐志摩) in May 2018

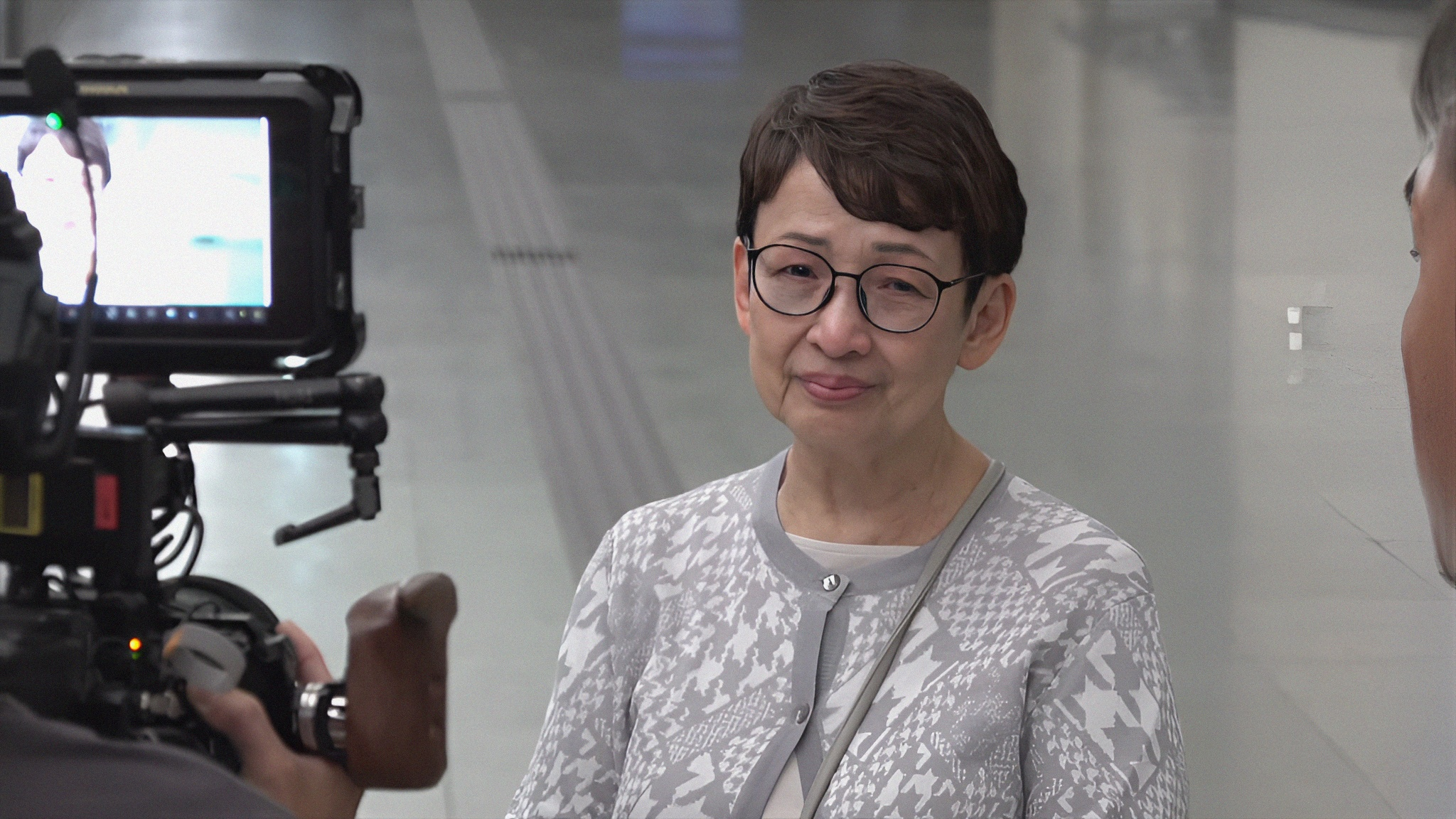
Fung filming a promotional video for MTR in November 2023

After graduating from primary school in Hong Kong, Fung returned to Guangzhou with his father, completed secondary school courses there, and went to the Southern Cantonese Opera Academy (南國粵劇學院), now called Nanguo Fine Arts College (南國藝術學院) to study art. (Note: 關於馮素波踏入戲劇界與歌壇、入讀南國粵劇學院和歌唱事業發展的資料來自香港電台第二台廣播節目《守下留情》於2015年7月15日播出的馮素波訪問。) She learned singing from Xu Pei (許佩, singing teacher of Patrick Tse and Susanna Kwan) in the 1960s, after that she became a resident singer at the King Kung Restaurant and Nightclub (瓊宮酒樓夜總會) in Tsim Sha Tsui from 1965.。

After the Seven Princess filmed the movie Seven Princesses (電影《七公主》) in 1967, a nightclub owner invited her and the other six "princesses" to sing on stage when the Kai Tak Amusement Park (啟德遊樂場) opened. Then gradually she got more career opportunities. At the request and encouragement of the nightclub owner, Fung decided to temporarily give up her acting career and concentrate on being a singer in the nightclub for several months. Soon, she met a brother and sister who were engaged in the acrobatics industry, and through them, she was introduced to the person in charge of a Thai nightclub "Honey Night Club".

Fung later went to Thailand and worked as a singer. She once went with the resident band to the Chitralada Royal Villa in Thailand (泰國皇宮吉拉達宮) to sing "Green Island Serenade" (綠島小夜曲) and "Rose, Rose, I Love You" (玫瑰玫瑰我愛你) in front of King Rama IX (拉瑪九世) Bhumibol Adulyadej (Siamese: ภูมิพลอดุลยเดช; Chinese: 普密蓬·阿杜德) and other royal family members. Eleven months later, she left Thailand due to visa issues, and was scheduled to perform in Ho Chi Minh City, Vietnam in 1967. However, soon after arriving at the place, she was forced to stay in the hotel for a month. With the help of the construction company employees, she flew back to Thailand and finally returned to Hong Kong. While developing her career in Thailand, she was spotted by a film producer and negotiated a contract, but ultimately failed.

Fung was later invited by the female owner of the Hong Kong nightclub "Show Boat" to join her company as a singer for three months. (Note: 關於馮素波返回香港發展經過的資料來自香港電台第二台廣播節目《守下留情》於2015年7月16日播出的馮素波訪問。) As her contract was about to expire, the female boss seconded Fung to Singapore to perform for Peking Garden Restaurant (「北京樓」飯店) for six months. In 1969 and 1970, Alice went to the "Hai Tian Cabaret" (海天歌廳) in Mong Kok to sing both morning and evening shows. At the same time, she sang Mandarin pop songs in the "Ciros Ballroom" (仙樂斯舞廳), "Empire Nightclub" (帝國夜總會) and "Royal Capital Nightclub" (皇都夜總會) in Tsim Sha Tsui. In 1980, as Fung was getting older and needed to take care of her family, and as Hong Kong nightclubs were declining, she needed a stable job. She worked as a warehouse clerk in a department store, responsible for handling communication and coordination between workers and warehouse logistics. (Note: 關於馮素波重返幕前經過和開演唱會的資料來自香港電台第二台廣播節目《守下留情》於2015年7月17日播出的馮素波訪問。https://www.rthk.hk/radio/radio1/programme/seesaw)

Once, the behind-the-scenes staff of the TVB "Enjoy Yourself Tonight" (歡樂今宵) production team came to the warehouse where she worked to look for workplace interviewees for TV interviews. She was selected as an interviewee. After the interview clip was broadcast in 1984, Asia Television producer Chuen-Yee Cha (查傳誼) contacted her to stage a comeback and star in the TV series "Butterfly Killer" (蝴蝶血). Another producer, Yuen Wai-yuen (阮惠源), also invited her to star in one of his series, I Love Mermaid (我愛美人魚). Prior to 1983, Cheung Chi Kok (張之珏) had invited Fung to star in Fatal Love (情難再) through Cheung Chun-Fai (張振輝), Fung's husband, who was the former musician and worked for the advertising department of Asia Television. When Tsui Siu-Ming (徐小明), then producer of Asia Television, learned that Fung had appeared on screen, he advised Fung to officially return to the screen and resign from her position as a warehouse clerk.

In 1990, Fung was poached by TVB. She then continued to serve TVB until 2012. After her comeback in the 1980s, she owned a lounge called "H20" in Wan Chai and also opened a lounge called "Poly Lounge" (寶麗廊) in Tsim Sha Tsui. In 2012, after her contract with TVB expired, Fung joined Hong Kong Television Network under Ricky Wong. She left Hong Kong Television Network in 2014, ending a two-year employment relationship. In May 2015, she was invited by Catherina Tsang (曾勵珍) to return to TVB.

Starting from 2020, Fung signed a non-exclusive one-show-a-year (一年一騷) contract with TVB, so she can film dramas for media other than TVB. In November 2022, the TVB drama I've Got the Power (超能使者) and the ViuTV drama Dead End (繩角) starring Fung were broadcast at the same time slot, making it a rare opportunity for Fung to appear on two TV channels at the same time. However, this coincidence became one of the fuses for her feud with TVB. Fung said in an interview after leaving TVB in 2024 that she had applied to the TVB Artist Department when she took on the filming of Dead End in 2022. Since her contract with TVB was for one drama per year, the head of the artist department had no right to prevent her from taking on programs for other TV stations. However, she pointed out that the person in charge later questioned why she did not inform the company earlier that Dead End would be broadcast at the same time as I've Got the Power, and asked her whether she would attend the promotional activities for the Dead End drama. Alice believed that this action angered the senior management, resulting in a significant reduction in her subsequent work at TVB.

In 2021, Fung was invited to be the guest host of the Commercial Radio 1 program Elderly Empire (樂齡王國) and has been on the program ever since. In March 2024, she announced her departure from TVB on social media. In May of the same year, she won her first acting award - Best Actress (Short Film) at the World Film Festival in Cannes (法國康城世界影展), for her role in the short film Garbage (垃圾) directed by Mak Yuen-yan (麥婉欣) about elderly abuse.

In the mid-2010s, Fung was approached by a production company to organize a concert. The opportunity came in 1990 when he participated in the play A Kindred Spirit (真情) and was arranged by the company to perform in Beijing. The event organizer knew that Fung was a talented singer and invited her to perform at the opening ceremony of a real estate project. In 2012, WSM Music Group (環星娛樂) also invited her to perform. The production company then sponsored Fung's solo concerts starting in 2014. In addition, Fung is a member of the Japanese Buddhist organization "Soka Gakkai International of Hong Kong" (香港國際創價學會) and a member of the "Performing Arts Group" (演藝組) of the organization's headquarters.
