= Enter the Eagles =

1998 Hong Kong film by Corey Yuen

- Film poster
- Traditional Chinese: 渾身是膽
- Simplified Chinese: 浑身是胆
- Hanyu Pinyin: Hún Shēn Shì Dǎn
- Jyutping: Wan6 San1 Si6 Daam2
- Directed by: Corey Yuen
- Screenplay by: Jeffrey Lau
- Story by: He Yu
- Produced by: Leonard Ho
- Starring: Michael Wong; Anita Yuen; Jordan Chan; Shannon Lee; Benny Urquidez; Jordan Andrew Perry
- Cinematography: Cheung Man-po
- Edited by: Mei Fung
- Music by: Peter Kam; Clarence Hui
- Production companies: Golden Harvest; GH Pictures
- Distributed by: Golden Harvest; Media Asia
- Release date: 1 October 1998
- Running time: 95 minutes
- Country: Hong Kong
- Languages: Cantonese; English

Enter the Eagles (also known in the United States as And Now You're Dead) is a 1998 Hong Kong action thriller film directed by Corey Yuen, with a screenplay was written by Jeffrey Lau, and produced by Leonard Ho. The film stars Michael Wong, with a supporting cast of Anita Yuen, Jordan Chan, Shannon Lee, Benny Urquidez and Jordan Andrew Perry.

Like Shannon Lee's late brother Brandon Lee's film Legacy of Rage (1986), this was Shannon Lee's first and only film produced in Hong Kong and co-stars Michael Wong, who played Michael Wan in Legacy of Rage.

== Plot ==
Professional thief Martin is assigned to steal the largest diamond in the Czech Republic, the Czar's Prism for $3M. Needing extra help, Martin brings in his former partner Mandy, an excellent sharpshooter with lethal martial arts skills. Together with two young pickpockets, the group sets out in an adventure of espionage, double crossing, and explosive action.

== Cast and characters ==
- Shannon Lee as Mandy
- Michael Wong as Marty
- Jordan Chan as Tommy Mak
- Anita Yuen as Lucy
- Benny Urquidez as Karloff
- Jordan Andrew Perry as Ben
- Mike Lambert as Mob Fighter
- Ricardo Alexander as Mob Fighter
- Jamie Wilson as Mob Fighter
- Mike Abbott
- Mike Miller as Bodyguard
- Noel Lester Rands as Wussin
- Steve Brettingham as Wussin's Bodyguard
- Jude Poyer as Wussin's Bodyguard
- Petr Meissel as Policeman
- Petr Koutecky as Policeman
- Petr Prosek as Policeman
- Josef Trnka as Policeman

== Home media release ==
On 23 April 2001, DVD was released by Mia at the United Kingdom in Region 2.
