= Shannon Lee =

American actress (born 1969)

Shannon Lee Keasler
- 李香凝
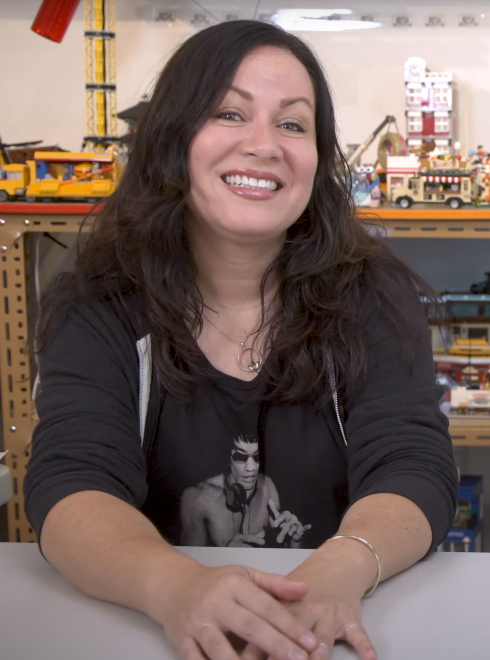
- Lee in 2019
- Born: Shannon Emery Lee; April 19, 1969 (age 57); Santa Monica, California, U.S.
- Occupations: Writer; actor; singer; martial artist
- Years active: 1993–present
- Spouse: Ian Keasler (m. 1994)
- Children: 1
- Parents: Bruce Lee (father); Linda Lee Cadwell (mother)
- Relatives: Lee Hoi-chuen (grandfather); Grace Ho (grandmother); Peter Lee Jung-sum (uncle); Robert Lee Jun-fai (uncle); Brandon Lee (brother)
- Musical career
- Also known as: Shan Shan
- Instrument: Vocals
- Formerly of: Medicine

Chinese name
- Chinese: 李香凝
Transcriptions
Standard Mandarin
- Hanyu Pinyin: Lǐ Xiāngníng
- Wade–Giles: Li Hsiang-ning
- Tongyong Pinyin: Lǐ Siāngníng
- Yale Romanization: Lǐ Syāngníng
- IPA: [lì ɕjáŋnǐŋ]
Yue: Cantonese
- Yale Romanization: Leíh Heūng-yìhng
- Jyutping: Lei5 Hoeng1-jing4
- IPA: [le̬i hœ́ːŋ jɪ̏ŋ]
Southern Min
- Hokkien POJ: Lí Hiuⁿ-gêng

Shannon Emery Lee Keasler (born Shannon Emery Lee; April 19, 1969) is an American actress. She is the only living child of actor and martial artist Bruce Lee and retired martial arts teacher Linda Lee Cadwell, and is the younger sister and the only sibling of actor Brandon Lee. Through Bruce Lee, she is a granddaughter of Cantonese opera singer and film actor Lee Hoi-chuen.

== Early life ==
Shannon was born on April 19, 1969, at UCLA Santa Monica Medical Center in Santa Monica, California, and grew up in Los Angeles. She was the youngest child and only daughter of martial arts film star Bruce Lee and Linda Emery. The family moved to Hong Kong when she was two years old, and returned to the United States after her father's death in 1973. In her youth she studied Jeet Kune Do, the martial art created by her father, under Richard Bustillo, one of her father's students.

== Career ==
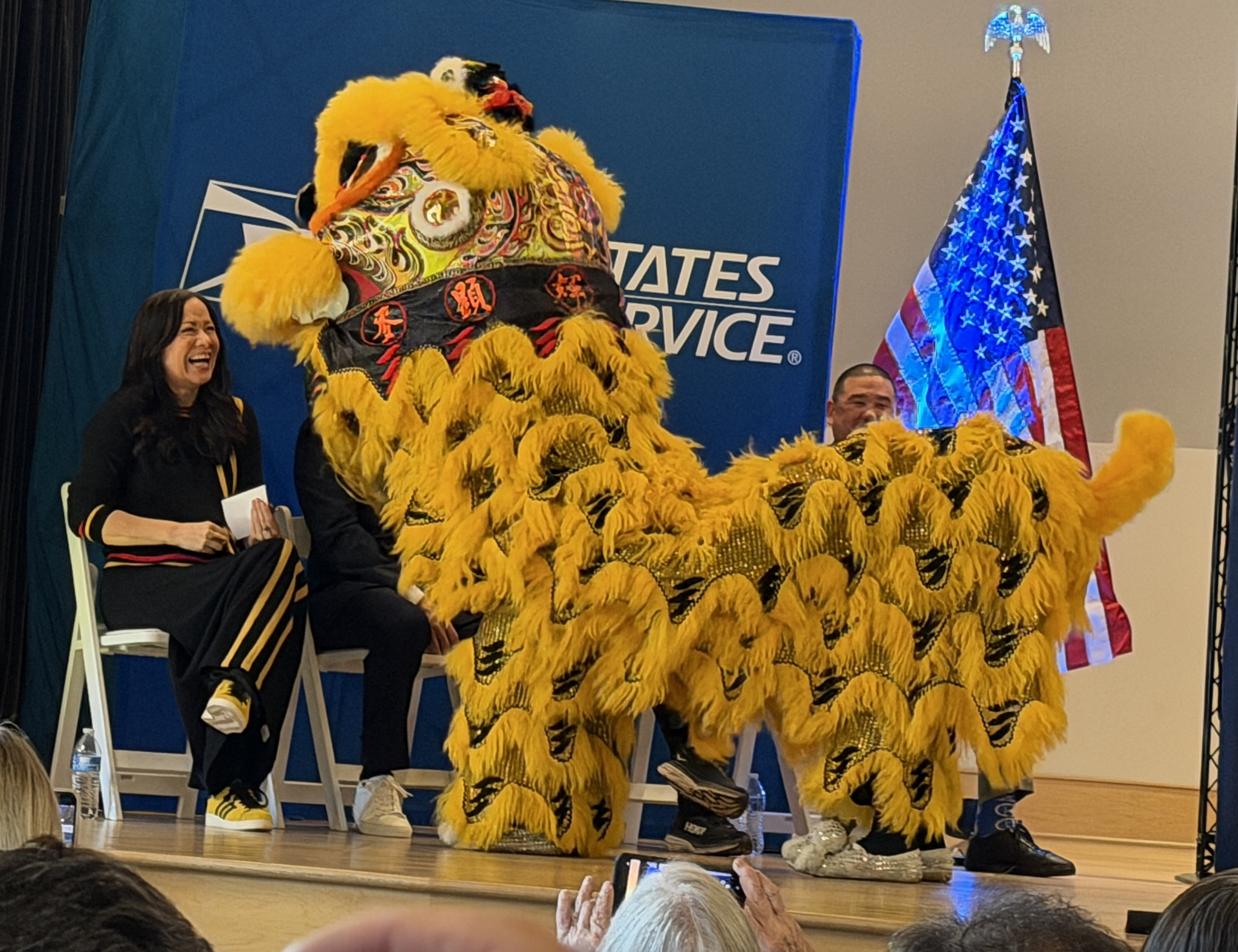
Shannon Lee laughs with a Lion dancer at a postal ceremony on Feb. 18, 2026.

In 1993, Lee made a cameo appearance as a party singer performing "California Dreamin'", in her father's biopic Dragon: The Bruce Lee Story. This was followed by supporting roles in the films Cage II (1994), with Lou Ferrigno and High Voltage (1998) with Antonio Sabato Jr.

In 1998, Lee played her first leading role in the Hong Kong action film Enter the Eagles, directed by Corey Yuen, co-starring Michael Wong and Anita Yuen. In the film, Lee had a fight scene with Benny Urquidez, who went on to teach her kickboxing. That same year, she guest-starred in an episode of the television series Martial Law alongside Sammo Hung.

In 2000, Lee sang a cover of "I'm in the Mood for Love" for the film China Strike Force directed by Stanley Tong.

Lee appeared in the sci-fi television film Epoch, which first aired on the Sci Fi Channel in 2001. In 2003, she played the leading role in the action film Lessons for an Assassin. She was also the host of the first season of the television show WMAC Masters.

Lee sang on the band Medicine's album The Mechanical Forces of Love in 2003.

Lee is president of the Bruce Lee Foundation. She was the executive producer of the 2008 television series The Legend of Bruce Lee, based on her father's life, and the 2009 documentary film How Bruce Lee Changed the World.

In 2020, Lee authored the book “Be Water, My Friend,” sharing the concepts at the core of Bruce Lee’s philosophies, showing how they can serve as tools of personal growth and self-actualization.

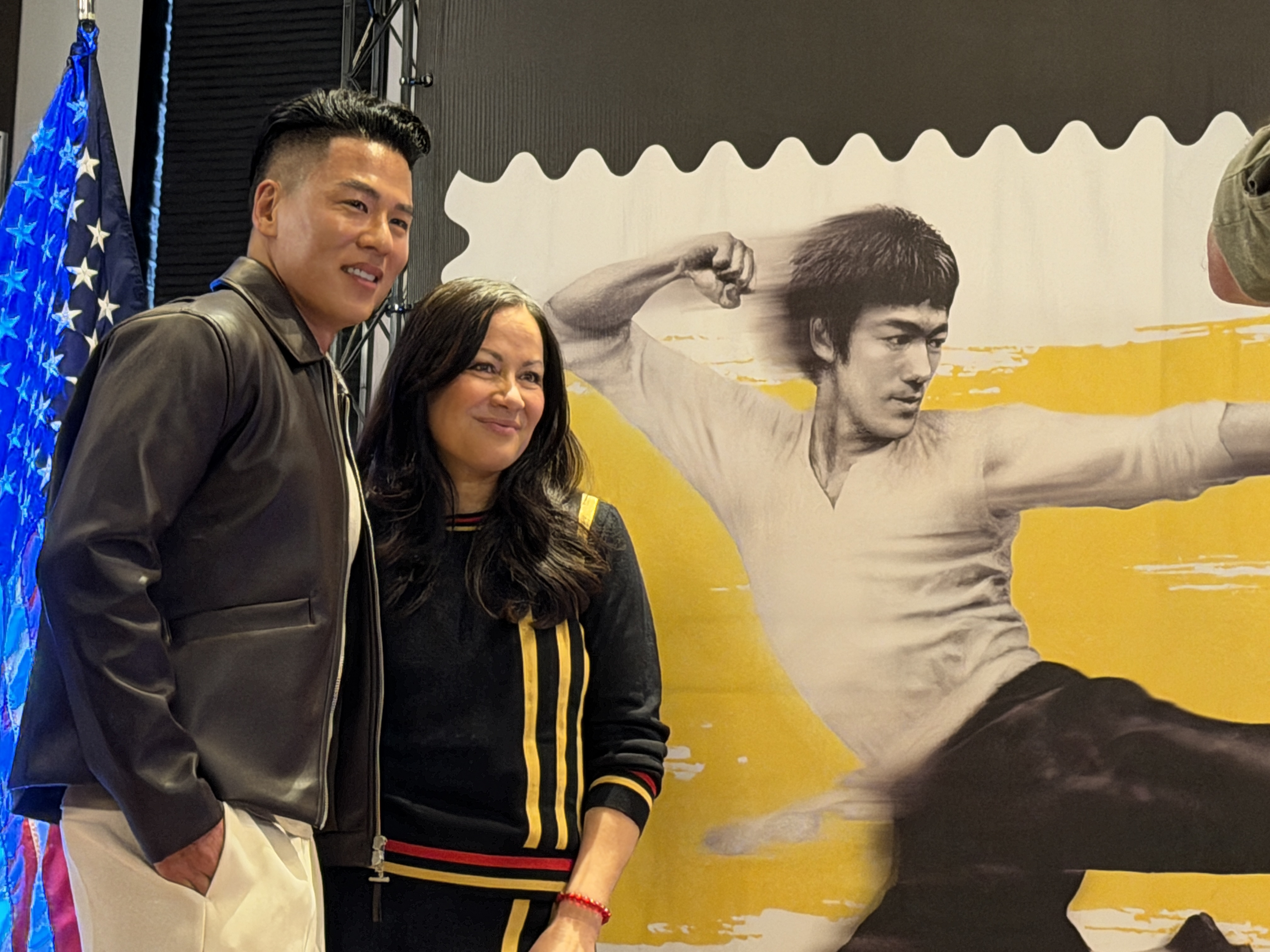
Shannon Lee poses with actor Rich Ting in front of a giant replica of a Bruce Lee stamp on Feb. 18, 2026.

In 2015, Perfect Storm Entertainment and Shannon Lee announced that the series Warrior, based on an original idea by Bruce Lee, would be produced and air on Cinemax. Filmmaker Justin Lin was chosen to direct the series, which debuted April 5, 2019.

In 2023, Lee guest starred in Season 3, episode 6 of Warrior, which marked her return to acting after 20 years.

In 2026 her YA novel Breath of the Dragon, co-written with Fonda Lee won the Aurora Award for Best YA Novel.

== Personal life ==
Lee's husband is Ian Keasler. Their daughter's name is Wren Lee Keasler.

Lee is the daughter of Bruce Lee, granddaughter of Lee Hoi-chuen and Grace Ho, sister of Brandon Lee, and niece of Robert Lee Jun-fai and Peter Lee Jung-sum. Lee's paternal great-grandfather was Ho Kom Tong, half-brother of Robert Hotung.

=== Martial arts ===
In her youth, Lee studied Jeet Kune Do, with her father's disciple Richard Bustillo, but did not practice it seriously until the late 1990s. To train for parts in action movies, she studied Jeet Kune Do with Ted Wong.

She studied Taekwondo under Tan Tao-liang AKA "Flash Legs" and Wushu under Eric Chen. She also studied under the tutelage of the director of Enter the Eagles, Yuen De, Jackie Chan's Chinese opera brother. Because the film Enter the Eagles (1998) required her to fight Benny Urquidez, Urquidez himself taught her kickboxing.

== Filmography ==
Film
Year	Title	Role	Notes
1993	Dragon: The Bruce Lee Story	Party Singer	
1994	Cage II	Milo	
1997	High Voltage	Jane Logan	
1998	Enter the Eagles	Mandy	Alternative title: Gwan Guen See Dam
1998	Blade	Resident	
2001	Lessons for an Assassin	Fiona	
2002	She, Me & Her	Paula Jemison	
2020	Be Water	Self	
Television
Year	Title	Role	Notes
1995	WMAC Masters	Host	13 episodes
1998	Martial Law	Vanessa Feng	Episode: "Take Out"
2001	Epoch	Pamela	Television film
2012	I Am Bruce Lee	Executive producer, herself	Television documentary
2023	Warrior	Wen	Season 3, Episode 6
Internet
Year	Title	Role	Notes
Unknown year	Pokémon Must Be Destroyed	Herself	Lost

== Bibliography ==
- Lee, Shannon (October 6, 2020). Be Water, My Friend. New York: Flatiron Books. ISBN 9781250206688.
- Lee, Shannon; Lee, Fonda (January 7, 2025). Breath of the Dragon. New York: Wednesday Books. ISBN 9781250902689.
- Lee, Shannon; Lee, Fonda (October 27, 2026). Mark of the Warrior. New York: Wednesday Books. ISBN 9781250902719.
