= The Vineyard (film) =

- DVD cover
- Directed by: James Hong; William Rice
- Screenplay by: James Hong; Douglas Kondo; James Marlowe
- Story by: Harry Mok; James Hong
- Produced by: Harry Mok
- Starring: James Hong; Michael Wong; Sherri Ball; Karen Witter; Cheryl Lawson
- Production company: Northstar
- Distributed by: New World Pictures
- Release date: 1989
- Running time: 93 minutes
- Country: United States
- Language: English

The Vineyard is a 1989 American horror film directed by James Hong and William Rice, written by Hong, Douglas Kondo, James Marlowe and Harry Mok, and starring Hong, Michael Wong, Sherri Ball and Playboy Playmate Karen Witter.

== Plot ==
Winemaker Dr. Elson Po fears that he is getting too old, so he kidnaps people and uses their blood to make his world-famous wine. Asking his god for eternal life, he drinks his wine and becomes young again. A group of young actors come to his mansion to audition for his purported "wine-making film" but the seven guests soon find out the secret of his wine and must escape.

== Cast ==
- James Hong as Dr. Elson Po
- Michael Wong as Jeremy Young
- Sherri Ball as Celeste
- Karl Heinz Teuber as Paul Edmonds
- Karen Witter as Jezebel
- Sean P. Donahue as Brian Whiteman

== Release ==
The Vineyard was given a limited release theatrically in the United States by New World Pictures in 1989. The film was later released on DVD in the U.S. by Anchor Bay Entertainment in 2001 and Image Entertainment in 2011, and was issued in the UK by Arrow Films in 2013.

On September 24, 2019, The Vineyard was given its first ever Blu-ray release (as a combo pack with a DVD) by Vinegar Syndrome, with the first 2,000 units featuring a limited edition embossed slipcover. The film was presented in a 4K restoration from the original camera negative, and bonus features included three interviews, the theatrical trailer and reversible cover artwork.

== Reception ==
Paul Risker of Starburst rated it 6/10 stars and wrote, "So long as you don't expect too much from it, The Vineyard is good fun, a nonsensical romp on an isolated island with plenty of cult moments to satisfy certain cravings." Food & Wine called it "the greatest wine-centric B horror film".

Writing in The Zombie Movie Encyclopedia, academic Peter Dendle wrote that the film's East Asian mythology helps to distinguish it, but it "falls into the usual late-'80s horror ruts, preferring isolated shocks to any gradual build-up of mood".
