= Mary Cheung =

Hong Kong artist (born 1952)

- 張瑪莉
- Born: 11 August 1952 (age 74); British Hong Kong
- Other name: Mary Pandora Cheung
- Education: Sacred Heart Canossian Commercial School; Hong Kong Polytechnic University
- Occupations: Image consultant; host; painter; photographer; former actress
- Years active: 1975–present
- Employer(s): Mary Cheung & Associates (International) Ltd. (founder)
- Height: 1.68 m (5 ft 6 in)
- Spouses: Peter Lee (m. 1980; div. 1995) John Yu (m. 2012)
- Children: 2

Chinese name
- Traditional Chinese: 張瑪莉
- Simplified Chinese: 张玛莉
Transcriptions
Standard Mandarin
- Hanyu Pinyin: Zhāng Mǎlì
Yue: Cantonese
- Jyutping: Zoeng^{1} Maa^{5} Lei^{6}
- Website: marycheung.com

Mary Cheung (born 11 August 1952) is a former Miss Hong Kong winner (1975), image consultant, host, painter, photographer and retired actress. She is the founder of the image consultancy and media-relations training company Mary Cheung & Associates and was widely regarded as one of the most successful women in Hong Kong.

== Background ==
Born in Hong Kong in 1952, at the age of six, Cheung lost the care of her birth parents due to a divorce and became an orphan. She was left in the streets as a vagrant to fend for herself for two years, before she was discovered and referred to the Social Welfare Department, and was taken to a charity organization Po Leung Kuk for adoption. She attend the Kiangsu-Chekiang College and upon graduation she studied business at the Sacred Heart Canossian Commercial School. She once attempted to become an air hostess.

Cheung competed in the 1975 Miss Hong Kong Beauty Pageant and emerged as a Champion. She entered CTV as an assistant editor and made her first acting appearance in the 1976 television series Star (明星). She left CTV prior to its bankruptcy and signed on as a RTV actress.

In 1980, Cheung was married to Dr Peter Lee (李忠琛), a meteorologist of the Royal Observatory Hong Kong and the elder brother of the late Bruce Lee. Following which, Cheung retired from the entertainment industry and took up management courses at the Hong Kong Polytechnic University. She gave birth to a son Lee Wai-ho (李偉豪) in 1981 and a daughter Lee Yuk-yee (李珏頤) in 1984. She was baptised as a Protestant in 1985.

In 1994, Cheung became a host of her own radio talk show Merry Mary (百分百張瑪莉) under the radio network Metro Info of the Metro Broadcast Corporation.

In 1995, Cheung and Lee divorced and her two children left with their father. Later on the same year, Cheung founded an image consultancy and media-relations training company Mary Cheung & Associates (International) Ltd. and serves as its managing director. She is also involved in public relations, consultancy, social interaction, public speaking, public welfare and education. At one point she was involved in the 2008 Summer Olympics educational affairs.

During her childhood time at Po Leung Kuk, Cheung had maintained a contact with an aunt, who lived in Los Angeles but did not reveal her true relations. After several letter engagements with the aunt to Cheung's later years, it was revealed that this aunt is a relative of her mother. Later in 2003, Cheung finally reunited with her then 80-year old birth mother, and she found out from her that her birth father had died much earlier.

In 2012, Cheung was remarried to the teacher and architect John Yu (余文平), the second son of Professor Timothy Yu (余也魯), the founding professor of School of Communication, Hong Kong Baptist University. Cheung's mother died in 2013 at the age of 90.

Cheung ended her Merry Mary radio talk show with Metro Info in December 2020 after running for 26 years.

== Filmography ==
=== Films ===
Year	Title	Original Title	Role	Note
1984	Double Decker	三文治		
1987	Life is a Moment	朝花夕拾		
1988	Hellbent		Dancing Girl	Cameo

=== Television dramas ===
Year	Title	Original Title	Role	Network	Note
1976	Star	明星		CTV	Also the original singer of the theme song Star (明星) (formerly 當你見到天上星星)
1978	Crocodile Tears	鱷魚淚	蕭愛蓮	RTV	
1978		郎心如鐵		RTV	
1979	It Takes A Thief	俠盜風流	Kung Fei-yin	RTV	
1979		追雲擒龍		RTV	
1979	Movie Circle	電影圈		RTV	
1979	Reincarnated	天蠶變	玄陰宮主	RTV	
1979	The Roving Swordsman	沈勝衣	慕容孤芳	RTV	
1979	Great White Shark	大白鯊		RTV	

=== Variety shows ===
Year	Title	Original Title	Role	Network	Notes
1985–1997	Crime Watch	繩之於法	Host	RTHK	

=== Radio shows ===
Year	Title	Original Title	Role	Network	Notes
1994–2020	Merry Mary	百分百張瑪莉	Host	Metro Info	

== Notable works ==
- (門內攝影集)
- Flower Says (花的宣言)
- (情牽筆墨)
- Outside World: New Zealand (人間世外新西蘭)
- Beautiful Memories (美麗的回憶)
- Women's Heart (女人心)
- Lover's Story (倩兒的故事)

== Awards ==
- 1975 Miss Hong Kong Champion
- 1988 Hong Kong Ten Outstanding Young Persons Award
- Most Successful Women of the 21st Century
- Top Ten Thoughtful Stars Award

Achievements
Preceded by Jojo Cheung	Miss Hong Kong; 1975	Succeeded by Rowena Lam
