= Robert Lee Jun-fai =

Robert Lee Jun-Fai
- 李振輝
- Born: Lee Jun-Fai; 16 December 1948 (age 77); Hong Kong
- Occupation: Musician
- Years active: 1966–1974
- Spouse: Sum Sum (m. 1977; div. 1983)
- Children: 1
- Parents: Lee Hoi-chuen (father); Grace Ho (mother)
- Family: Peter Lee Jung-sum (brother); Bruce Lee (brother); Brandon Lee (nephew); Shannon Lee (niece)
- Musical career
- Origin: Hong Kong
- Genres: Hong Kong English pop, rock
- Instruments: Vocals, electric guitar, acoustic guitar

Chinese name
- Traditional Chinese: 李振輝
- Simplified Chinese: 李振辉
Transcriptions
Standard Mandarin
- Hanyu Pinyin: Lǐ Zhènhuī
Yue: Cantonese
- Jyutping: Lei5 Zan3-fai1

Robert Lee Jun-fai (born 16 December 1948) is a Hong Kong musician. He is the younger brother of the late martial artist Bruce Lee.

== Early life ==
Lee was born on 16 December 1948 in British Hong Kong, and was the youngest son of Grace Ho and Lee Hoi-chuen, a Chinese Cantonese opera and film actor.

== Career ==
Lee was the founder of a Hong Kong beat band called the Thunderbirds, a beat group in the same Hong Kong/Macau musical scene as Danny Diaz & the Checkmates, Zoundcrakers, Anders Nelson & the Inspiration, D'Topnotes and Teddy Robin & the Playboys. He founded the group in 1966 and quickly became famous in Hong Kong. A few singles were sung mostly or all in English. Also released was Lee singing a duet with Irene Ryder.

He later moved to Los Angeles in the United States and stayed with his older brother Bruce Lee. After Bruce's death, Robert released an album dedicated to him called The Ballad of Bruce Lee. A single of the same title was also released.

On 27 November 2005, Robert unveiled a Bruce Lee statue in Hong Kong, celebrating what would have been Bruce's 65th birthday. He wrote the story for, produced, and narrated the 2010 film Bruce Lee, My Brother.

== Personal life ==
Lee is the youngest brother of Phoebe Lee, Agnes Lee, Peter Lee, and Bruce Lee. He is the uncle of Shannon Lee and Brandon Lee.

In 1977, Lee married Hong Kong singer and actress Sylvia Lai, who performed under the stage name of Sum Sum (森森). They have a son named Clarence Ka Ho Lee born in 1980, and the couple divorced in 1983. Clarence lived with his parents in California in the mid-1990s.

== Discography ==
=== Albums ===
- Ballad of Bruce Lee (1974), Sunrise

=== Singles and EPs ===
- "Baby Baby" / "You Put Me Down" (Irene Ryder & Robert Lee) (196?), HK Columbia
- The Thunderbirds & the Nautics (196?), ECHK 513
- "Ballad of Bruce Lee" (1974), Sunrise

=== Compilation appearances ===
- Uncle Ray's Choice – "Baby Baby" (Irene Ryder & Robert Lee) (1968), EMI
