= High Voltage (1997 film) =

- Directed by: Isaac Florentine
- Written by: Mike Mains
- Produced by: Ivon Visalli; Mike Mains; Yoram Barzilai
- Starring: Shannon Lee; Antonio Sabàto Jr. Amy Smart; Lochlyn Munro; George Kee Cheung
- Cinematography: Philip D. Schwarz
- Edited by: Bill Butler
- Music by: Stephen Edwards
- Production company: Amco Entertainment Group
- Distributed by: Amco Entertainment Group (United States)
- Release date: 1997
- Running time: 95 minutes
- Country: United States
- Language: English

High Voltage is a 1997 American direct-to-video action film directed by Isaac Florentine and starring Antonio Sabàto, Jr., Shannon Lee, Amy Smart, George Kee Cheung, Lochlyn Munro, James Lew, William Zabka and Antonio Sabato.

== Plot ==
A group of close-knit thieves are led by Johnny (Antonio Sabàto, Jr), Mollie (Amy Smart), Larry (Lochlyn Munro) and Sam (Mike Mains). Their latest target is a small bank in Little Saigon, Orange Country, California. Mollie has been working in the bank undercover for months with the bank's manager Jane (Shannon Lee) unaware of what she plans to do. On the day of the robbery, Johnny and the rest of the gang burst in, forcing everyone on the floor. Johnny orders Jane to open the bank vault. As she opens it, Johnny discovers a large cache of money which is laundered by a Vietnamese mobster named Victor Phan (George Kee Cheung). Instead of taking the money, they escape empty-handed. Victor orders his men to go after the gang and Jane is revealed to be Victor's mistress who is imprisoned by him. She wants to leave Victor but knows he would never let her go. Johnny and his gang manage to survive an attack on them by Victor's men and join forces with Jane, who offers them Victor's money if they kill him. On the night Victor is meeting with drug dealers at his nightclub, Johnny and his gang burst in, leading to a shootout. They successfully steal his money and escape with Jane, but Victor survives the attack, forcing the group to go on the run with Victor and his men after them.

== Cast ==
- Antonio Sabàto Jr. as Johnny Clay
- Shannon Lee as Jane Logan
- Amy Smart as Molly
- Lochlyn Munro as Larry
- George Kee Cheung as Victor Phan
- Mike Mains as Sam Hicks
- William Zabka as Bulldog
- James Lew as Harry
- Antonio Sabàto as Carlo
