= Michael Wong (actor) =

American actor

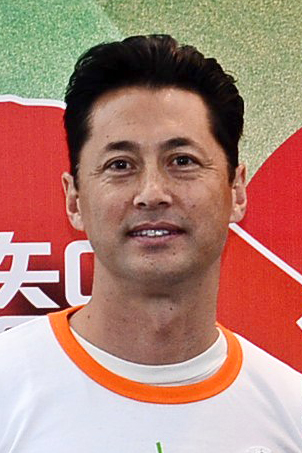
- Michael Wong in 2013.
- Born: Michael Fitzgerald Wong; Troy, New York, U.S.
- Occupation: Actor
- Years active: 1985–present
- Agent: Shaw Brothers Studio (2018–present)
- Height: 1.85 m (6 ft 1 in)
- Spouse: Janet Ma (m. 1992)
- Children: 3
- Family: Russell Wong (brother)

Michael Fitzgerald Wong a.k.a. Wong Man-tak (Chinese: 王敏德; pinyin: Wáng Mǐndé) is a Chinese-American actor based in Hong Kong.

He is fluent in English, but not in Chinese, which is reflected in many of the characters he has portrayed. His most notable film is the 1998 film Beast Cops, which won a Hong Kong Film Award with Wong in the lead role. As of 2025, he has appeared in over a hundred films, mainly in the Hong Kong film industry.

== Early life ==
Michael Wong was born and raised in Troy, New York, the son of restaurateur, William Wong, and an American artist of Dutch and French descent, Connie Van Yserloo (d. 2024). His brothers, Russell Wong and Declan Wong, would also become actors in the Hong Kong film industry. After finishing high school, he left to go to Hong Kong to try his luck in acting. One of his first jobs was as a stunt double for the actor Sam Hui in the film Aces Go Places

There were a number of significant factors against Wong's eventual success in the Hong Kong film industry, including an inability to speak Cantonese Chinese, no formal training in acting and no background in martial arts. He also lacked an entry into the tightly knit Hong Kong film industry.

== Career ==
=== Acting career ===
His acting debut was in 1985's City Hero, then in 1986 he was cast in his first major role, Legacy of Rage alongside Brandon Lee. His next significant film was Royal Warriors a.k.a. In the Line of Duty, which established his dominant image for the first part of his career as a naive but tough outsider.

He made his English language movie debut in James Hong's The Vineyard in 1989.

Final Option, released in 1994, would make Wong a major star in the Chinese film industry. Playing the role of a police officer, Stone Wong, he established a tougher image.

In 1995, he starred alongside Jackie Chan in Thunderbolt.

In 1996, he reappeared as Stone Wong in the prequel First Option for which he would be nominated for both a Hong Kong Film Award and a Golden Horse Award. Also that year, Wong starred in the Canadian TV production Once A Thief directed by John Woo.

His starring role in Beast Cops, which won a 1998 Best Film prize at the Hong Kong film awards, further consolidated his position. Also that year he acted with Shannon Lee in Enter the Eagles, and played the role of a detective in the Jean-Claude Van Damme film, Knock Off.

In 2000, Wong made his debut as a director in Miles Apart, which he also produced and starred in. In the 2002 movie New Option, he reprised the role of Stone Wong. He has continued to work in the Hong Kong film industry, though more often as a supporting player rather than a leading man, in productions such as Cold War, Skiptrace and Triple Threat.

In 2023 he co-starred in A Guilty Conscience, the first movie in the Hong Kong film industry's history to make $100 million Hong Kong dollars at the local box office. The film would also win the Hong Kong film award for Best Film.

=== Music career ===
With his international fame, in 1993 and 1994 he had the opportunity to shoot TV commercials, star in Thai films and release an album in Thailand. His studio album was signed to Grammy Entertainment (present-day GMM Grammy) and was sung in Thai via romanization. Chun-mah-glai (ฉันมาไกล, "I've Come So Far") is his best-known and promoted song.

In 2006, Wong re-entered the music scene by performing "big band" music accompanied by a 10 piece band with the likes of "Come Fly with Me".

In 2015 he released an E.P. of new music, entitled Airways of Love.

== Personal life ==
Wong married Hong Kong supermodel Janet Ma in 1992 and they had two daughters, Kayla Wong and Irisa Shannon Wong, and one son, Kadin Miles Wong.

Wong is a keen helicopter enthusiast, having held a pilot's license since 1998. In 2008, he served a term as President of the Hong Kong Helicopter Club.

== Filmography ==
- Cesium Fallout (2024)
- Rob N Roll (2024)
- A Guilty Conscience (2023 film) (2023)
- Flying Tiger 3 (2021)
- Flying Tiger 2 (2020)
- Triple Threat (2019)
- Chasing the Dragon II: Wild Wild Bunch (2019)
- Flying Tiger (2018)
- Secret Treasure (2017)
- Skiptrace (2016)
- Transformers: Age of Extinction (2014)
- Z Storm (2014)
- Delete My Love (2014)
- From Vegas to Macau (2014)
- Firestorm (2013)
- SDU: Sex Duties Unit (2013)
- 7 Assassins (2013)
- Cold War (2012)
- Nightfall (2012)
- Dear Enemy (亲密敌人, 2011)
- Triple Tap (2010)
- The Blood Bond (2010)
- Overheard (2009)
- Drive of Life (TVB Drama 2007)
- The Counting House (2006)
- PTU File: Death Trap (2005)
- Seven Swords (2005)
- House of Fury (2005)
- Magic Kitchen (2004)
- Women from Mars (2002)
- Partners (2002)
- The New Option (2002)
- Calmi Couri Appassionati (冷靜與熱情之間, 2001)
- There is a Secret in my Soup (2001)
- Violent Cop (2000)
- At the Threshold of an Era (TVB Drama 1999)
- Knock Off (1998)
- Beast Cops (1998)
- Enter the Eagles (1998)
- Lost and Found (1996)
- First Option (1996)
- Thunderbolt (1995)
- Chaophya Dragon (Thai film 1994)
- Return to a Better Tomorrow (1994)
- The Final Option (飛虎雄心, 1994)
- City Hunter (1993)
- Tiger Cage 3 (1991)
- The Vineyard (1989)
- In the Line of Duty 4: Witness (1989)
- Legacy of Rage (1986)
- City Hero (1985)
