= Sum Sum =

Hong Kong singer and actress (born 1951)

Sum Sum 森森
- 森森
- Born: Lai Siu-Pun (黎小斌); 23 June 1951 (age 75); British Hong Kong
- Other names: Sylvia Lai; Miss Thirty Cents (三亳子小姐); Third Missy (三小姐)
- Occupations: Singer; actress
- Years active: 1966–present
- Agents: TVB (1967–1983); ATV (1983–2006)
- Spouses: Robert Lee (m. 1977; div. 1983) Wong Chung-tak (m. 1992)
- Children: 1
- Family: Ban Ban (sister)
- Musical career
- Also known as: Sum Sum
- Origin: British Hong Kong
- Genres: Cantopop; Mandopop
- Website: 森森 & 斑斑 on Facebook

Chinese name
- Chinese: 森森
Transcriptions
Standard Mandarin
- Hanyu Pinyin: Sēn Sēn

Sylvia Lai Sui-pun
- Chinese: 黎小斌
Transcriptions
Standard Mandarin
- Hanyu Pinyin: Lí Xiǎobīn

Sylvia Lai Sui-Pun (born 23 June 1951), also known by her stage name Sum Sum, is a semi-retired Hong Kong singer and actress.

== Background ==
Lai was born in Hong Kong on 23 June 1951. She is of Meixian ancestry. Her younger sister is Betty Lai Siu-man.

In 1966, Lai, her sister and other four male singers formed a musical band BumbleBee to promote their traffic and road safety song in Hong Kong. In 1967, Lai joined RTV to attend its first Artist Academy. One of her classmates was Liza Wang.

In 1967, Lai took the stage name Sum Sum (森森), while her sister's stage name went first as Bun Bun (彬彬) but soon changed to Ban Ban (斑斑). In late 1967, Lai contested and won the Hong Kong's Queen of Singing Diva (香港歌后) title, and was encouraged by Robert Chua to sign up to become one of TVB's first batch of actors and actresses. She also became a host in the TVB's variety show Enjoy Yourself Tonight (歡樂今宵).

Sum Sum took up a training lesson of Jeet Kune Do with Bruce Lee while he was in Hong Kong with his young son Brandon on 3 April 1970, prior to Lee's appearance in Enjoy Yourself Tonight four days later in 7 April.

In 1972, Sum Sum formed a musical duo group Sum Sum Ban Ban (森森斑斑) with her sister. Ban Ban also joined in to host Enjoy Yourself Tonight with her sister in 1973.

In 1979, they released their first album Star, Moon, Sun (星星.月亮.冇太陽). Sum Sum and Ban Ban left TVB in 1983 to join ATV to further pursue their acting and singing careers.

In 1997, she was invited by TVB to host the reestablished but short-lived variety show Enjoy Yourself Tonight. She also made live advertising roles for HKTV on a weekly basis.

From 1999 onwards, Sum Sum, with her sister Ban Ban, would host and perform for several entertainment companies in many international venues and charity events, i.e. United States (Seattle, Chicago, Los Angeles, Atlantic City, Philadelphia, Sacramento), Canada, Singapore, Australia (Melbourne and Sydney) and Macau. During that period on 27 September 2003, she was noted to be the first Chinese singer to perform with the Mississauga Symphony Orchestra at the Mississauga Convention Centre in Mississauga, Canada.

Her last acting appearance was in 2006. In May 2012, she was interviewed in the ATV's television show aTV 100 Celebrities.

== Personal life ==
In December 1977, Sum Sum married Robert Lee (李振輝), brother of Bruce Lee. They have a son named Clarence Lee Ka Ho (李嘉豪) in 1980, and they divorced in 1983. Sum Sum retained custody of their son. Clarence's stage name is "家豪".

She later remarried to Macau businessman Wong Chung-tak (王宗德). The ceremony was held at a hotel in Vancouver in 1992, prepared by her friend Louise Lee (李思棋). She later moved to Macau.
