= It Takes a Thief =

"It Takes a Thief" may refer to:

== Films ==
- The Challenge (1960 film), a British crime film
- It Takes a Thief (film), a 1999 Hong Kong film featuring Yukari Oshima

== TV ==
- It Takes a Thief (1968 TV series), an American action/adventure television series starring Robert Wagner
- It Takes a Thief (1979 TV series), a Hong Kong television series
- It Takes a Thief (2005 TV series), an American reality television series
- "It Takes a Thief", a 2003 episode of The Proud Family

== Music ==
- It Takes a Thief (album), a 1994 album by Coolio
- It Takes a Thief, a 2010 compilation album by Thievery Corporation
