= Karen Witter =

American model

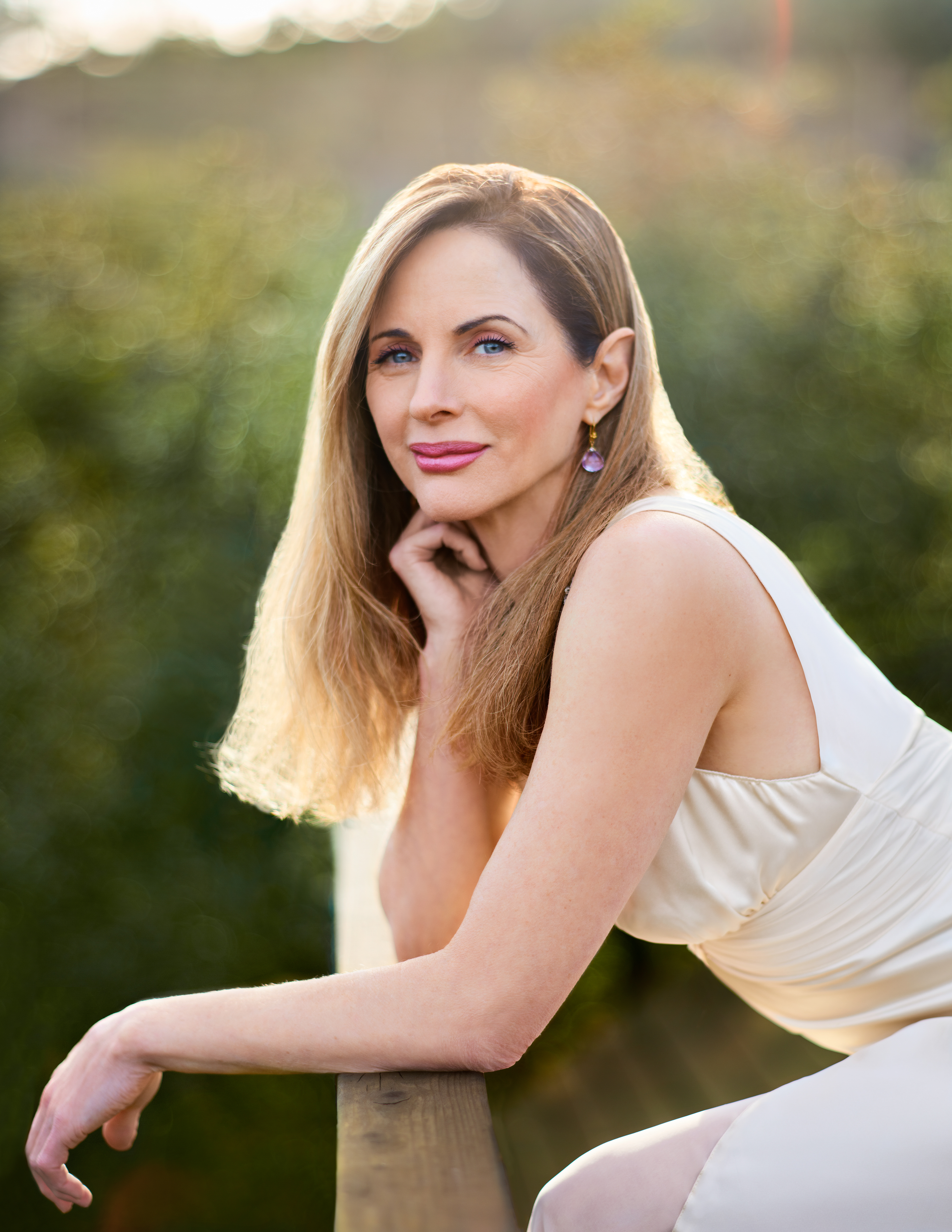
- Witter in 2020
- Born: Karen R. Witter; December 13, 1961 (age 64); Long Beach, California, U.S.
- Other name: Karen Lorre
- Occupations: Model, actress, writer
- Spouse: Chuck Lorre (m. 2001; div. 2010)
- Website: karenlorre.com

Karen R. Lorre (née Witter; born December 13, 1961) is an American actress, model, and author.

== Early life ==
Lorre was born Karen Witter, in Long Beach, California. Lorre was a pre-med psycho-physiology major at the University of California, Irvine. She studied the biochemical origins of mental illness while there. To raise money for tuition, she worked as a model and appeared in commercials.

== Career ==
Lorre was Playboy magazine's Playmate of the Month for its March 1982 issue, and her centerfold was photographed by Arny Freytag. Witter later appeared on the cover of the March 1983 issue with fellow Playmates Kimberly McArthur and Kelly Tough. She was also featured in the December 1991 issue.

Lorre soon made the transition to acting, working mostly on television on series as diverse as Mickey Spillane's Mike Hammer (1984), the syndicated version of Sale of the Century (1985–86), Cheers (1988), The Vineyard (1989), and The X-Files (1995). Witter later appeared as Nemesis in Hercules: The Legendary Journeys, in the seventh episode "Pride Comes Before a Brawl" (1995). Sliders (1996), Sabrina the Teenage Witch (1998), NYPD Blue (2000), Dharma & Greg (2000), and Malcolm in the Middle (2001).

Lorre was cast in the role of Tina Lord, previously played by Andrea Evans, on the ABC soap opera One Life to Live, after "one of the most expansive [searches] in soap history", beating out over 300 other hopefuls for the role. Connie Passalacqua of Soap Scoop praised her casting in the role, saying it "added an actress with considerable dimension to the soap opera scene". She played the part until 1994. She was nominated for a 1991 Soap Opera Digest Award for Outstanding Female Newcomer in Daytime.

Lorre retired from acting, and became a life coach and spiritual healer. She has written three books on spiritual healing.

== Personal life ==
Lorre married television writer and producer Chuck Lorre in 2001, changing her name from Karen Witter to Karen Lorre.

== Published works ==
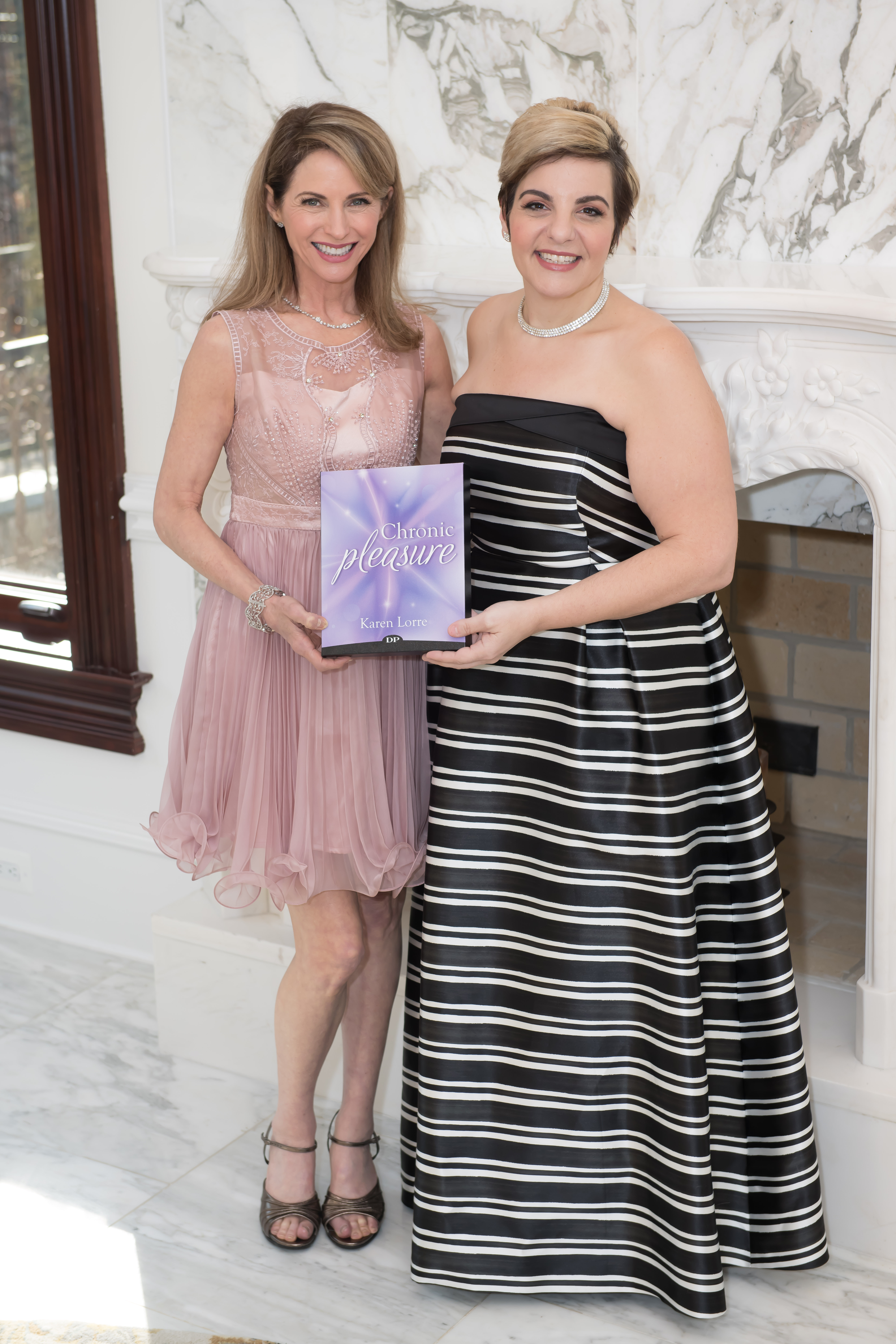
Karen Lorre (left) with Angela Lauria at launch of her first book, Chronic Pleasure, on December 13, 2018, in The Author's Castle, Virginia.

- Lorre, Karen (2018). Chronic Pleasure: Use the Law of Attraction to Transform Fatigue and Pain into Vibrant Energy. Morgan James, a division of Ingram Publishing. ISBN 978-1-64279-511-0.
- Lorre, Karen (2020). Effortless Enchantment: A Memoir of Magic, Magnetism, and Miracles. Lifestyle Entrepreneurs Press, a division of Ingram Publishing. ISBN 978-1-950367-71-9.
- Lorre, Karen (2021). Chronic Pleasure in Relationships. ISBN 9798741573075.

Kimberly McArthur	Anne-Marie Fox	Karen Witter	Linda Rhys Vaughn	Kym Malin	Lourdes Estores
Lynda Wiesmeier	Cathy St. George	Connie Brighton	Marianne Gravatte	Marlene Janssen	Charlotte Kemp
