= City Hero =

1985 Hong Kong film by Dennis Yu

- Film poster
- Traditional Chinese: 飛虎奇兵
- Simplified Chinese: 飞虎奇兵
- Hanyu Pinyin: Fēi Hǔ Qí Bīng
- Jyutping: Fei1 Fu2 Kei6 Bing1
- Directed by: Dennis Yu
- Screenplay by: Ng Kam-hung; Lam Koon-kiu; Ng Cheuk-hei
- Produced by: Dennis Yu
- Starring: Dean Shek; Mark Cheng; Bennett Pang; Anthony Tang; Billy Lau; Michael Wong; Pat Ha; Charine Chan
- Cinematography: Gray Ho
- Edited by: Tony Chow; Wong Ming-lam
- Music by: Danny Chung
- Production companies: Cinema City; Dennis Yu Production
- Distributed by: Cinema City
- Release date: 9 October 1985
- Running time: 93 minutes
- Country: Hong Kong
- Language: Cantonese
- Box office: HK$7,375,915

City Hero is a 1985 Hong Kong action comedy film directed by Dennis Yu and starring Dean Shek, Mark Cheng, Bennett Pang, Anthony Tang, Billy Lau and Michael Wong.

In the film, five idealistic police officers volunteer for training to join the Special Duties Unit. They have to practice their new skills when called to respond to a hostage taking situation on Christmas.

== Plot ==
Five young and idealistic policemen, nicknamed Bravo (Mark Cheng), Rambo (Anthony Tang), Superstition (Bennett Pang), Wealthy (Michael Wong) and Old Bachelor (Billy Lau) are tired of their jobs and are determined to join the Special Duties Unit. Instructor Lee (Dean Shek) demands discipline, efficiency and obedience.

Despite the hostility and hardships, the young officers begin to realize that Instructor Lee is passionate at heart. Eventually, they all respect him for his devotion and inspiration. During Christmas night, they are summoned to an emergency assignment. A dozen of innocent citizen are held as hostages. The death of Bravo in their first successful mission sadden their high spirit and celebrating mood.

== Cast ==
- Dean Shek as SDU Trainer Lee
- Mark Cheng as Luk Ying-kei / Bravo
- Bennett Pang as Ng Sam-kwai / Superstition
- Anthony Tang as Rambo
- Billy Lau as Old Bachelor
- Michael Wong as Lee Ka-ho / Wealthy
- Pat Ha as Siu-wai
- Charine Chan as Chu-chu
- Lee Heung-kam as Siu-wai's mom
- Ku Feng as Siu-wai's dad
- Tin Ching as SDU Assistant Trainer
- Billy Chow as thug
- Siu Yuk-lung as thug
- So Hon-sang as thug
- Ko Miu-si as Trainer Lee's wife
- Wong Man as Assistant Trainer's wife
- Law Keung as man at street fight
- Stephen Chan as Ming
- Bobby Wu
- Yuen Ling-to
- Yu Mo-lin as hostage
- Sai Gwa-Pau as hostage
- Leung Hak-shun
- Fung King-chi
- Patrick Tsui
- Ho Leng-leng
- Cheung Hing-choi
- Ka Sang
- Chiu Sze-wai
- Ngan Yee-kei
- Wong Chi-ying
- Lam Foo-wai
- Yat-poon Chai as Police Officer in parade
- Luk Ying-hong as Inspector Law

== Box office ==
The film grossed HK$7,375,915 at the Hong Kong box office during its theatrical run from 9 to 30 October 1985 in Hong Kong.
