= The Kid (1950 film) =

1950 Hong Kong film by Fung Fung

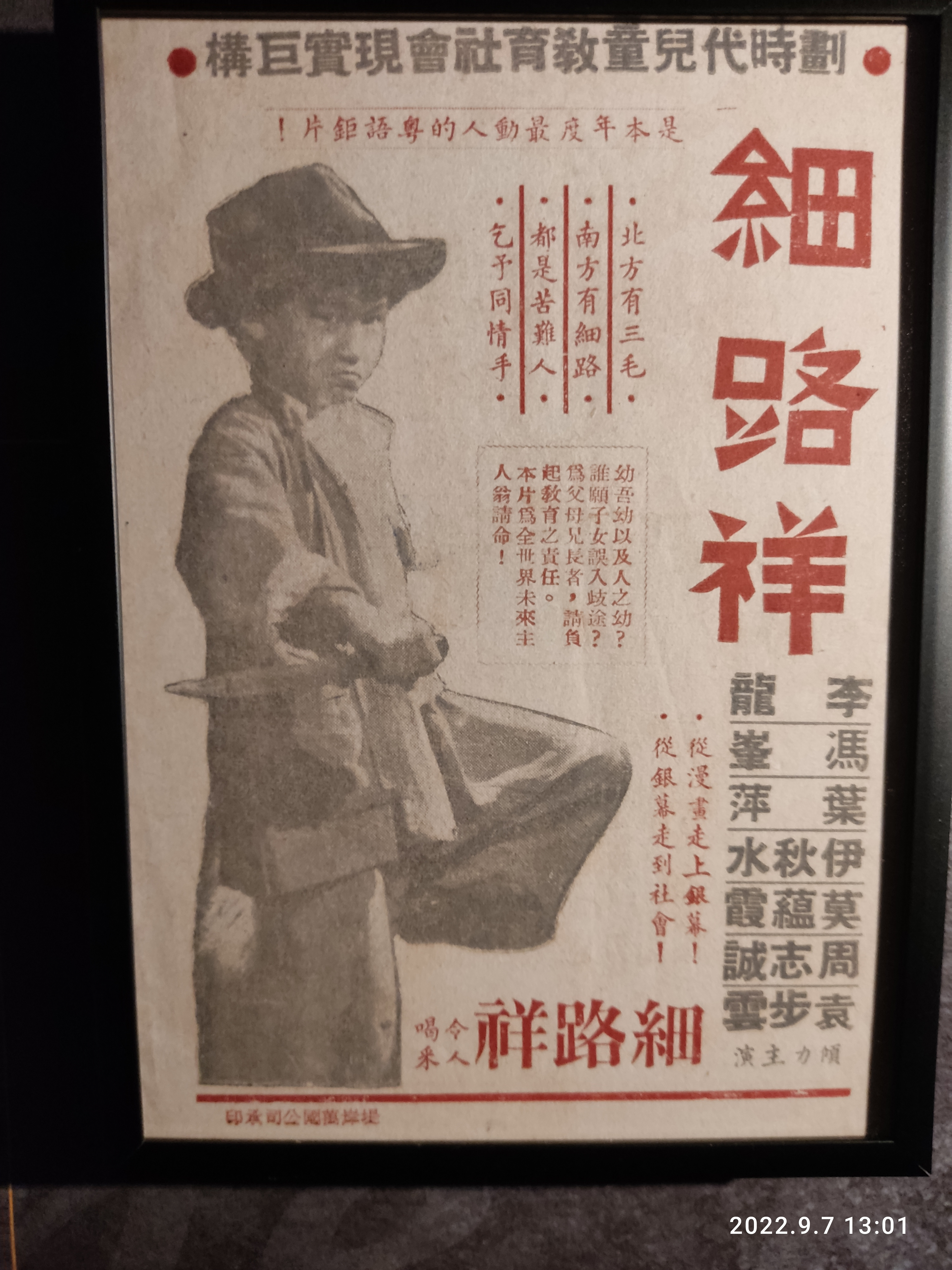
- Original film poster
- Traditional Chinese: 細路祥
- Simplified Chinese: 细路祥
- Hanyu Pinyin: Xì Lù Xiáng
- Jyutping: Sai^{3} Lou^{6} Ceong^{4}
- Directed by: Fung Fung
- Screenplay by: Cho Kei
- Based on: Kid Cheung by Yuen Po-wan
- Produced by: Leung Biu
- Starring: Bruce Lee; Lee Hoi-chuen; Fung Fung
- Cinematography: Yuen Chang-sam
- Edited by: Mang Lung
- Production company: Datong Film Company
- Distributed by: Xingguang Film Company
- Release date: 30 May 1950
- Running time: 80 minutes
- Country: Hong Kong
- Language: Cantonese

The Kid (also known as Kid Cheung and My Son A-Chang) is a 1950 Hong Kong drama film starring the then 9-year-old Bruce Lee in his first leading role in the title role of "Kid Cheung", and based on a comic book character written by Yuen Bou-wan, who also has a role in the film. The film co-stars Lee's real life father, Lee Hoi-chuen, and Fung Fung. This is the second film in which the father and son worked together on, the other being The Birth of Mankind in 1946.

== Plot ==
Rich tycoon Hung Pak-ho (Lee Hoi-chuen), a medicine factory owner and chairman of the Children's Health and Education Association (兒童康育會), agrees to fund a school for poor children only for the sake of his reputation, hoping his promise will be forgotten by the association soon. While leaving from the association meeting, Hung gets his wallet, watch, along with her daughter, So Mui's (Tong Yuen), stolen by robber Flash Knife Lee (Fung Fung) and his gang. While Lee runs from the police, Kid Cheung (Bruce Lee) helps Lee evade them by letting Lee hide in his house. Lee leaves the necklace he stole in Cheung's home, which is found by his uncle, Ho (Yee Chau-sui), who brings Cheung to Hung's house to return it, hoping for a reward. Hung has no intention to give them any rewards until So Mui nags him to do so, so Hung hires Ho as his new secretary and helps Cheung get a spot at his daughter's school, despite Cheung's reluctance. However, Cheung is bullied by his schoolmates and fights them, so Cheung is expelled as a result. Therefore, Hung offers Cheung a position as a apprentice in his factory where he is bullied by the foreman, Four Eyed Tsui (Chow Chi-sing) and gets into a rivalry with another child apprentice. Cheung then gets his left arm injured by his rival and later works for Lee as thief, much to the displeasure of his uncle.

Meanwhile, the female workers of the medicine factory have gone on strike due to harsh working conditions and a result of Tsui and Hung's son, Chiu, preventing their complaints from being heard by Hung. Tsui and Chiu, who have been stealing goods from the factory for Lee's gang to smuggle, devises a plot to have Lee's gang rob the factory and frame it on the female workers, while Tsui and Boaster Chiu (Yuen Po-wan) also schemes to have Lee's gang arrested as well by calling the police on them. When Lee's gang, including Cheung, proceeds to execute the robbery, Cheung bumps into one of the female workers Lui Mei (Chan Wai-yue), who defended him in the past when Tsui bullied him. Mei persuades Cheung to stop what he is doing. Lee then catches Chiu calling the police before getting in a fight with a male employee. Mei also persuades Lee to stop the robbery, believing him to be an honorable man, so Lee allows the female workers to leave and also convinces Cheung that stealing is not heroic and not right as well as telling his underling, Ratso Ping (Che Tin) to go straight and give a sum of money to Ho for Cheung and his family for farming in their ancestral home.

In the end, Mei represents the workers to request reasonable working conditions to Hung, which he agrees to. On the other hand, Hung's wife, Sei (Yip Ping) elopes with his new secretary, Lau, whom she has an affair with, while members of the Children's Health and Education Association arrive to discuss the funding of the school, which gives him a headache. Mei and her colleagues along with So sends Cheung, Ho and his cousins off as they leave to return to their ancestral home.

== Cast ==
- Bruce Lee as Ho Cheung (何祥), nicknamed Kid Cheung (細路祥), a poor child who runs a stall with his younger cousins. Not interested in education and often gets into fights, he later becomes a thief working for Flash Knife Lee, although he still cares for his family, despite his uncle's anger towards him.
- Lee Hoi-chuen as Hung Pak-ho (洪百好), owner of a medicine factory and chairman of the Children's Health and Education Association (兒童康育會) who is greedy and hoards his wealth and only cares for his reputation. He is a failure as a family man as his wife cheats on him and his son steals from him.
- Fung Fung as Flash Knife Lee (飛刀李), leader of a robber gang and an expert knife thrower who is a man of honor despite being a criminal. He takes Cheung as his disciple as the child once helped him evade the police.
- Yee Chau-sui as Uncle Ho (何大叔), Cheung's uncle who is a former teacher before becoming Hung's secretary.
- Chan Wai-yue as Lui Mei (呂薇), a worker in Hung's factory who stands up for her colleagues due to harsh working conditions and defends Cheung when he was bullied.
- Yuen Po-wan as Boaster Chiu (沙塵超), Hung's spoiled elder son who schemes with Four Eyed Tsui to steal from his father's factory for Lee's gang to smuggle. He also lusts Mei and constantly harasses her.
- Ko Lo-chuen as Secretary Ko (高秘書), Hung's former secretary who retired shortly before Ho was hired as his replacement.
- Tong Yuen as So Mui (蘇妹), Hung's younger daughter who is Cheung's friend.
- Wong Kwai-lam as Ngau (阿牛), Ho's elder son and Cheung's younger cousin.
- Alice Fung So-bor as Chu (阿珠), Ho's younger daughter and Cheung's younger cousin.
- Chow Chi-sing as Four Eyed Tsui (四眼徐), the foreman of Hung's factory who bullies the workers, particularly Cheung. He schemes with Chiu to steal medicine for Lee's gang to smuggle.
- Yip Ping as Sei (四太), Hung's wife who cheats on him.
- Ko Chiu as Secretary Lau (劉秘書), Hung's new secretary who replaces Ho and has an affair with Sei.
- Yip Yan-foo as a teacher at Cheung's school.
- Ting Ling as Staff
- Fung Ging-man as Lee's robber gang member.
- Che Tin as Ratso Ping (老鼠炳), Lee's underling.
- Lee Chau-wan as Hung's housemaid.
- Mok Wan-ha as a factory worker.
- Allyson Chang as a factory worker.
- Law Lan as a factory worker.
- Chan Lap-Ban as the landlady of Ho's home.

== See also ==
- Bruce Lee filmography
- Hong Kong films of 1950
