= Siu-Mui Leung =

Chinese actress (1932–1964)

- Chinese: 梁素梅
- Born: 1932
- Died: 1964 (aged 31–32)
- Other names: Leung Siu Mooi, Leung So-Mui
- Occupation: Actress
- Years active: 1950–1962

Siu-Mui Leung (1932–1964)(Chinese: 梁素梅) is a former Chinese actress from Hong Kong. Leung is credited with over 80 films.

== Career ==
In 1950, Leung became an actress in Hong Kong films. Leung first appeared in A Chivalrous Bandit, a 1950 martial arts Cantonese opera film directed by Chan Pei. Leung was active in 1950s. Leung also appeared Magic of Tiger Dragon (aka How Old Master Jiang Crossed the River), a 1950 Cantonese opera film. In martial arts film, Leung appeared in films such as Peach-Blossom Hero Spies on Poisonous Dragon Swamp by Night (1950) and Hu Weiqian Smashes the Engine Room (aka Wu Wai-kin Smashes the Factory Machines)(1950). In drama films, Leung appeared in films such as Wave of Jealousy (1950), How Song Jiang Slew His Mistress Yan Poxi (1950), Devil's Family (1950), and Sad Song of an Orphan Girl (1950). In comedy films, Leung appeared in films such as The Merry Lovers (1951), Night of Romance (1952), and Wrong Wedding (1954). Leung's last film was A Loving Husband for My Lovely Daughter, a 1962 comedy film directed by Fok Yin. Leung is credited with over 80 films.

== Filmography ==
=== Films ===
This is a partial list of films.

- 1950 A Chivalrous Bandit
- 1950 A White Python Usurps the Dragon's Palace
- 1950 How Song Jiang Slew His Mistress Yan Poxi
- 1950 Hu Weiqian Smashes the Engine Room (aka Wu Wai-kin Smashes the Factory Machines)
- 1950 Magic of Tiger Dragon (aka How Old Master Jiang Crossed the River)
- 1950 Peach-Blossom Hero Spies on Poisonous Dragon Swamp by Night
- 1950 Sad Song of an Orphan Girl
- 1950 Wave of Jealousy
- 1951 The Merry Lovers
- 1952 Night of Romance - Classmate
- 1954 Wrong Wedding
- 1956 The Wise Guys Who Fool Around (aka Sweet Time Together)
- 1962 A Loving Husband for My Lovely Daughter
