= Lap-Ban Chan =

Chinese actress from Hong Kong

- Chinese: 陳立品
- Born: 1911; Udonthani, Thailand
- Died: 1990 (aged 78–79); Hong Kong
- Other names: Chan Lap-Ban, Chan Lap-Pun, Chan Lap-Bun, Chan Laap-Ban, Maria Chan, Chen Hui-Fang, Chen Li-Pin
- Occupation: Actress
- Years active: 1949–1990

Lap-Ban Chan (Chinese: 陳立品) (1911-1990) was a former Chinese actress from Hong Kong. Chan was credited with over 440 films.

== Personal life ==
In 1911, Chan was born in Thailand.

== Career ==
In 1949, Chan became an actress for Nanyang Film Company in Hong Kong. Chan first appeared in Adventure at the Women's House, a 1949 Cantonese opera film directed by Fung Chi-Kong. Chan primarily played supporting roles, such as a mother, aunt, landlady, sifu, doctor or maid, in a wide variety of films, including Hong Kong action cinema and comedies. Her most well-known films include Blood, Rouge and Tears (1950), Joyous Reunion (1952), Half a Sword (Part 1) (1963), and Buddha's Palm (1982). Chan's last film was Look Out, Officer!, a 1990 comedy film directed by Lau Shut-Yue. Chan is credited with over 440 films.

== Filmography ==
=== Films ===
This is a partial list of films.

- 1949 Adventure at the Women's House - Cantonese opera
- 1950 Black Market Marriage
- 1950 Wild Flowers Are Sweeter - Ah Choi, maid
- 1950 The Kid - Landlady
- 1950 Lust of a Grand Lady - Musical
- 1950 Blood, Rouge and Tears - Doctor
- 1952 Joyous Reunion - Pretty woman
- 1955 Backyard Adventures - Fortune-teller's servant
- 1955 The Faithful Wife
- 1963 Half a Sword (Part 1) - Sifu
- 1965 Dim-Sum Queen - Eighth Aunt
- 1979 The Wickedness in Poverty - Old Playboy bunny
- 1981 Super Fool! - Dragon's mother
- 1981 Bewitched - Old magic woman
- 1981 Wedding Bells, Wedding Belles
- 1982 Buddha's Palm - Clan leader
- 1983 Hong Kong Playboys
- 1983 The Lost Generation - Auntie Sam
- 1983 Red Panther - Lei's mother
- 1984 Prince Charming - May's grandmother
- 1984 Wits of the Brats - Mary, old maid
- 1989 God of Gamblers - Knife's mother
- 1990 Look Out, Officer! - Cleaning lady

== Personal life ==
On July 18, 1990, Chan died in Hong Kong.
