= Lee Hoi-chuen =

Chinese singer and actor; father of Bruce Lee (1901–1965)

- 李海泉
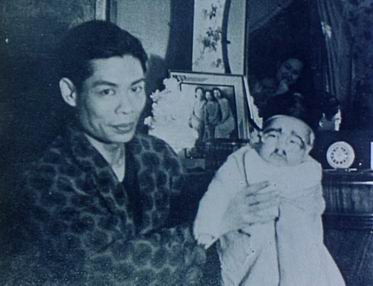
- Lee holding son in 1940s
- Born: Lee Moon-shuen; 4 February 1901; Jun'an, Guangdong, China
- Died: 7 February 1965 (aged 64); St. Teresa's Hospital, Kowloon, Hong Kong
- Burial place: St. Raphael's Catholic Cemetery, Cheung Sha Wan, Hong Kong
- Occupation: Actor
- Spouse: Grace Ho
- Children: 5, including Peter, Bruce, and Robert
- Relatives: Brandon Lee (grandson); Shannon Lee (granddaughter)

Chinese name
- Traditional Chinese: 李海泉
- Simplified Chinese: 李海泉
Transcriptions
Standard Mandarin
- Hanyu Pinyin: Lǐ Hǎiquán
Yue: Cantonese
- Jyutping: Lei5 Hoi2-cyun4

Lee Moon-shuen (Chinese: 李滿船; 4 February 1901 – 7 February 1965), known professionally as Lee Hoi-chuen (Chinese: 李海泉), was a Chinese opera singer and film actor in Hong Kong. He was the father of Bruce Lee, the father-in-law of Linda Lee Cadwell, and the paternal grandfather of Brandon Lee and Shannon Lee.

== Family ==
Lee was born on 4 February 1901, in Jun'an, Guangdong, in the waning years of the Qing Dynasty. He moved to Hong Kong, then a British colony, and became a Cantonese opera actor. There, he met and married Grace Ho (1907–1996), a Chinese Eurasian and a daughter of Ho Kom-tong. They had two daughters, Phoebe and Agnes, and three sons, Peter, Bruce and Robert.

Lee and his wife were on a one-year US tour with the Cantonese Opera Company in 1940 when their second son Bruce Lee was born in San Francisco. They later returned to Hong Kong when Bruce Lee was three months old. Soon after, the Lee family led an unexpected four-year hard life as Japan, in the midst of World War II, launched a surprise attack of Hong Kong in December 1941 and ruled for four years. Bruce later fathered Brandon Lee.

Their youngest son Robert Lee, who was born in 1948, would go on to become famous in Hong Kong during the 1960s as the lead singer and founder of a popular beat band, The Thunderbirds.

Lee died of a heart attack in Hong Kong on 7 February 1965, aged 64. He was buried at St Raphael's Catholic Cemetery at Cheung Sha Wan in Kowloon.

== In popular culture ==
Lee Hoi-chuen was portrayed by Ric Young in the 1993 film Dragon: The Bruce Lee Story and by Tony Leung Ka-fai in the 2010 film Bruce Lee, My Brother.
