= Fung Fung =

Hong Kong actor

- Born: Feng Rusheng; 1 December 1916; Zhongshan, Guangdong
- Died: 16 February 2000 (aged 83); Hong Kong
- Years active: 1936–2000

Chinese name
- Traditional Chinese: 馮峰
- Simplified Chinese: 冯峰
Transcriptions
Standard Mandarin
- Hanyu Pinyin: féng fēng
Yue: Cantonese
- Jyutping: fung4 fung1

Fung Fung (simplified Chinese: 冯峰; traditional Chinese: 馮峰; pinyin: Féng Fēng; 1 December 1916 – 16 February 2000) was a veteran Hong Kong actor. He began his career as a leading man in 1946. An accident in 1949 left the left side of his face paralysed, but, while no longer able to attract leading roles, he enjoyed a long career as a character actor, appearing in films alongside such stars as Jackie Chan and Sammo Hung. He was the father of Fung Bo Bo, a child star of the 1960s, Alice Fung So-bor, a veteran actress, and Fung Hak-On, an actor known for playing villainous roles in several kung fu/action comedies of the 1970s and 1980s.

== Filmography ==
=== Films ===
This is a partial list of films.

- We Owe It to Our Children (1936)
- Xi nan er bo fu (1937)
- Chun hua qiu yue (1937)
- Ernu Yingxiong (1937)
- Gongzi Geer (1937)
- Hui Zuguo Qu (1937)
- Back to Our Nation (1937)
- Longcheng Feijian (1938)
- Maihua Nu (1938)
- Ernu Yingxiong Xiji (1938)
- Qimi Yang Jiagu (1938)
- Zhengui Guhanzhong (1938)
- Xiguan Si Meiren (1939)
- Zhen tou zhuang (1939)
- Zuihou de Banlu (1939)
- Sandao Jiulong Bei (1939)
- Zuihou Shengli (1939)
- Hongfu Nu Siben (1939)
- Daxia Gan Fengchi (1939)
- Daliang Adou Guan (1939)
- Sanxi Bai Juhua (1939)
- Yanzhi Ma (1939)
- Da Nao Sanmen Jie (1939)
- Yuannu Wang Fu Gui (1939)
- Yuanhun Ta (1939)
- Wagang Zhai (1939)
- Yi Si Yanluowang (1939)
- Zhao Kuangyin Ye Song Jing Niang (1939)
- Huoshao Shishi (1939)
- Wu Pan An (1939)
- Zhongguo Yeren Wang (1940)
- Yongzheng Huang Ye Dao Xiang Fei (1940)
- Di Quin (1940)
- Wang Zhaojun (1940)
- Tianding Facai (1940)
- Cixi Xitaihou (1940)
- Guanyin Dedao (1940)
- Yue Fei (1940)
- Wu hu ping xi (1940)
- Xiao Guang Dong (1940)
- Shiwan Tongshi (1940)
- Hongjin Wu (1940)
- Xu Rengui Zheng Dong (1940)
- Chayi Hu (1940)
- Renhai Leihen (1940)
- Dadi Huichen (1940)
- Yan Shuangfei (1941)
- Jin xiao chong jian yue tuan yuan (1941)
- Nu biao shi (1941)
- Chunse Manyuan (1941)
- Hua jie shen nu (1941)
- Xiao Laohu (1941)
- Minzu de Housheng (1941)
- Jietou Boshi (1941)
- Fenghuo Guxiang (1941)
- Xuegong Chunse (1941)
- Hongdou Qu (1941)
- The Red Bean Ballad (1941)
- Homeland in War (1941)
- Chenqi musao (1947)
- Hua yue liang xiao (1948)
- Si feng qi fei (1948)
- Yi guan qin shou (1948)
- Jiang hu tie han (1947)
- 1950 Ji jia huan xiao ji jia chou
- 1950 Xiadao Qinghua
- 1950 The Kid - Flash Knife Lee
- Ren hai wan hua tong (1950)
- 1955 Qiu Haitang
- 1955 Spanking the Princess
- 1956 Love vs Love (aka Little Sweetheart) - Writer, director.
- 1958 Feng huo jia ren
- 1958 Fu ma yan shi
- 1958 Shi wan tong shi - Juen Ging Gung
- 1958 Dai chat ho see gei (1958)
- You qing ren (1958)
- Jing chai ji (1958)
- Li gui yuan chou (1959)
- The Orphan (1960) - Go Kong-lung
- Mong ngai ting Seung zap (1960)
- Ke lian tian xia fu mu xin (1960)
- Mu zi lei (1961)
- Ma sheng xiao yi ren (1962) - Old opera artist
- Man tang ji qing (1964)
- Zi ding xiang (1968)
- 1969 Sam chiu liu
- 1970 The Lonely Rider (aka The Gallant Boy) - Director, screenwriter, actor.
- 1970 Yesterday, Today, Tomorrow
- 1975 Da jie an
- Gu huo nu guang gun cai (1975)
- Jin lian (1976)
- Enter the Fat Dragon (1978)
- Ha luo, ye gui ren (1978)
- The Young Master (1980) - Ah Suk
- Di yu wu men (1980) - Priest
- Ye che (1980)
- Qian zuo guai (1980)
- Lao shu jie (1981)
- Zhui nu zhai (1981)
- Security Unlimited (1981) - Driving Instructor
- Legend of a Fighter (1982) - Boxing promoter
- ru lai shen zhang (1982)
- Chong ji 21 (1982)
- Xing ji dun tai (1983)
- Lit foh ching sau (1991)
- Betrayal of Wang (2002) - (segment "100 Flowers Hidden Deep") (final film role)
