= Linda Lee Cadwell =

American teacher, writer, the widow of Bruce Lee

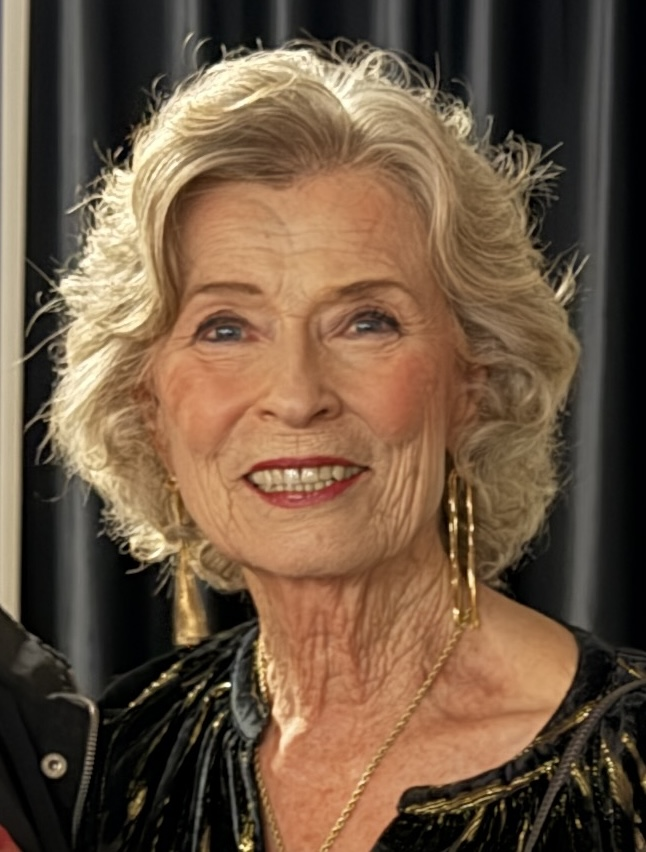
- Lee in 2026
- Born: Linda Claire Emery; March 21, 1945 (age 81); Everett, Washington, U.S.
- Other name: Linda Lee
- Education: University of Washington
- Occupations: Teacher; martial artist; writer
- Years active: 1964–2001
- Notable work: Bruce Lee: The Man Only I Knew (1975); The Bruce Lee Story (1989)
- Spouses: Bruce Lee (m. 1964; died 1973); Tom Bleecker (m. 1988; div. 1990); Bruce Cadwell (m. 1991)
- Children: Brandon; Shannon
- Website: bruceleefoundation.com

Linda Claire Emery Lee Cadwell (née Emery; born March 21, 1945) is an American retired teacher and writer, the widow of martial artist and actor Bruce Lee (1940–1973), and the mother of actor Brandon Lee (1965–1993) and actress Shannon Lee (born 1969). She is the author of the Bruce Lee biography Bruce Lee: The Man Only I Knew, upon which the film Dragon: The Bruce Lee Story (1993) is based, as well as the founder, former trustee, and unpaid advisor of the Bruce Lee Foundation.

== Early life ==
Cadwell was born and raised in Everett, Washington, the daughter of Vivian R. (née Hester; 1911–1998) and Everett Emery (1910–1950). Her family was Baptist and of Swedish, Irish, and English descent. Cadwell's father died of a heart attack when she was five years old; she, her mother, and older sister subsequently moved to Seattle, where she attended Edward Meany Junior High. When Cadwell was eight, her mother remarried to a man who she says "did not participate in being a parent to us, not as a Dad and not financially at all either."

== Personal life ==
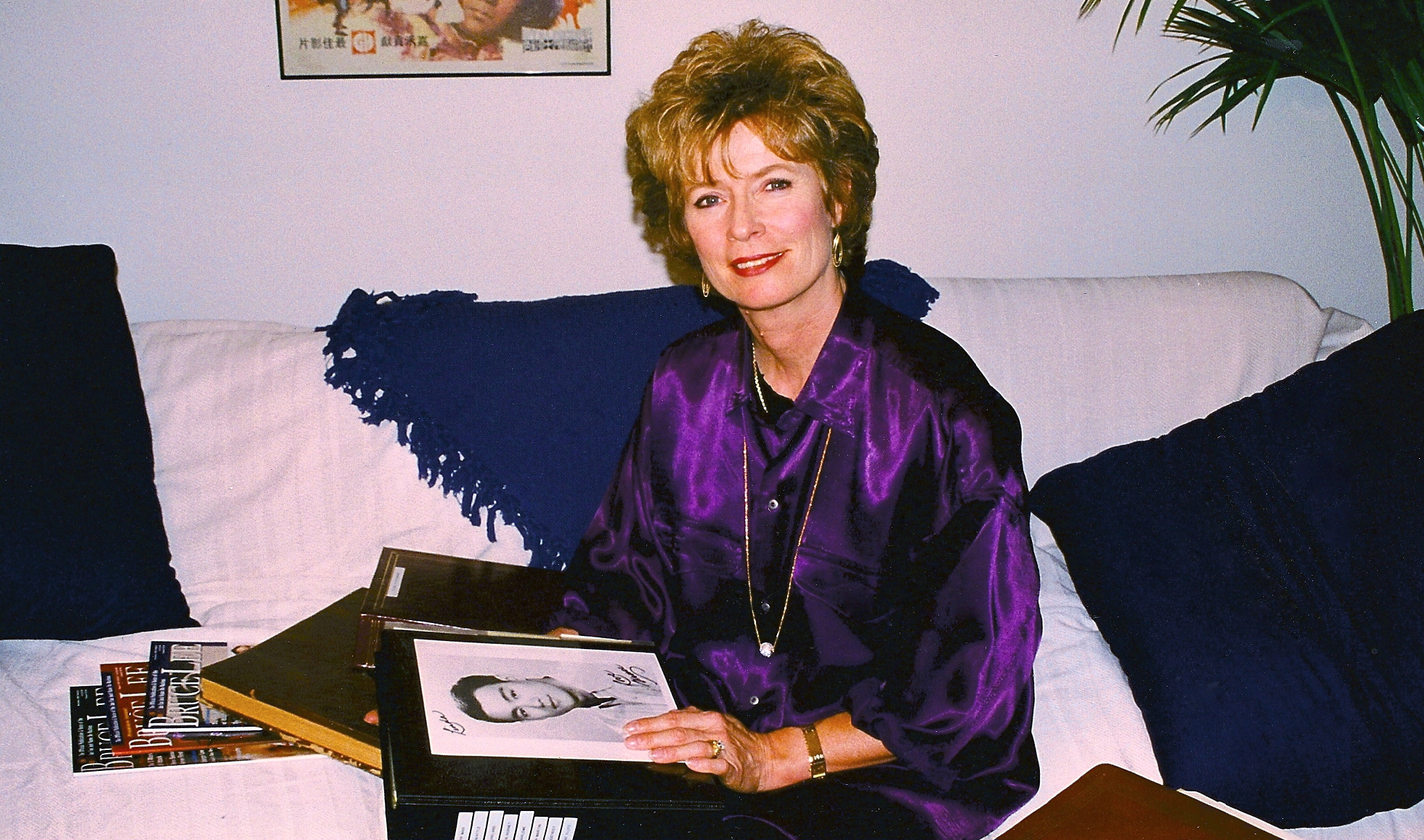
Cadwell shooting a documentary about Bruce Lee in 1998

Cadwell met Bruce Lee while she was attending Garfield High School, where Lee came to give a kung fu demonstration; he was attending the University of Washington at the time. Eventually, she became one of his kung fu students when she was attending the University of Washington, studying to become a doctor. Cadwell's mother disapproved of the relationship due to Lee's ethnicity. They dated for about a year before they married on August 17, 1964. They had two children, Brandon (born 1965) and Shannon (born 1969). Lee died suddenly on July 20, 1973, of an allergic reaction to an analgesic.

Cadwell married Tom Bleecker in 1988, and they divorced in 1990. She married Bruce Cadwell in 1991, and they settled in southern California.

On March 31, 1993, Brandon was accidentally shot to death by an improperly loaded prop gun while filming The Crow.

In August 1993, Cadwell, filed a lawsuit against the filmmakers alleging negligence in the death of her son. The suit was settled two months later under undisclosed terms.

Cadwell became a grandmother when her daughter Shannon, who married Ian Kessler in 1994, gave birth to a daughter in 2003.

== Books ==
Cadwell wrote the 1975 book Bruce Lee: The Man Only I Knew (ISBN 0-446-89407-9), on which the 1993 feature film Dragon: The Bruce Lee Story was based. She was portrayed by actress Lauren Holly in the film adaptation. She also wrote the 1989 book The Bruce Lee Story (ISBN 0-89750121-7).
