= Silent Snow, Secret Snow =

Short story by Conrad Aiken

"Silent Snow, Secret Snow" (1932) is Conrad Aiken's best-known short story, often included in anthologies of classic American horror and fantasy short fiction. It was first published in the Autumn 1932 issue of the Virginia Quarterly Review. It later appeared in The Collected Stories of Conrad Aiken in 1934, and since then has been widely anthologized.

== Plot ==
The story tells of a 12-year-old boy named Paul Hasleman, who finds it increasingly difficult to pay attention to his classwork while growing more distant from his family. He is, instead, becoming more and more entranced by daydreaming about snow. This began when he was lying in bed one morning, awaiting the approach of the postman. Unable to hear the expected footfalls, the boy imagines that they have been muffled by newly fallen snow, and is surprised when he looks out the window and discovers that there is no snow on the ground.

Paul's increasing distance and indifference to the world around him alarms his parents. He has to struggle to get dressed and converse with others, because of the allure of his daydream about snow. His parents eventually call in a physician, who makes a house call to examine Paul. After revealing that he likes to think about snow, Paul tears himself away from the meeting with the physician and retreats to his room. When his mother pursues him, he tells her "Go away ... I hate you!", and is lost in the dreamworld of the snow.

== Interpretations ==
The story tells of a normal boy's descent into a dream world of snow that he finds preferable to the dirty and mundane world. The story can also be thought of as a Symbolist rejection of reality. The progressive withdrawal from reality and social relationships, as well as preoccupation with idiosyncratically meaningful ideas could be interpreted as characteristic of schizophrenia.

== Adaptations ==
In 1964 a 17-minute short film based on the story was produced by Gene Kearney.

It was dramatized as an episode of Rod Serling's Night Gallery, also directed by Kearney, starring Radames Pera and narrated by Orson Welles. The original broadcast date was October 20, 1971.

The story was the inspiration for an instrumental song of the same name by guitarist Jim Matheos on his first solo album, First Impressions.

The story inspired the song "Silent Snow" by musician Scott Appel on his album Nine of Swords.

The story inspired the song "KEROSENE" by musician OF SAINT.

The story is also referenced by English heavy metal band Loathe in their song "Is it Really You?"
