= Mary Aiken =

Mary Aiken may refer to:

== People ==
- Mary Aiken Littauer (1912–2005), American horse expert
- Mary Aiken (psychologist), Irish cyber psychologist, and inspiration for the CSI: Cyber character Avery Ryan
- Mary Hoover Aiken (1905–1992), American painter
- Mary Morlan Aiken, birth name of Mo Isom (born 1989), American former soccer player

== Fictional characters ==
- Mary Aiken, in the 1977 US comedy film Andy Warhol's Bad, played by Susan Tyrrell

== See also ==
- Loretta Mary Aiken (1894–1975), American standup comedian
