= Kam Yuen =

American martial arts expert (1941–2023)

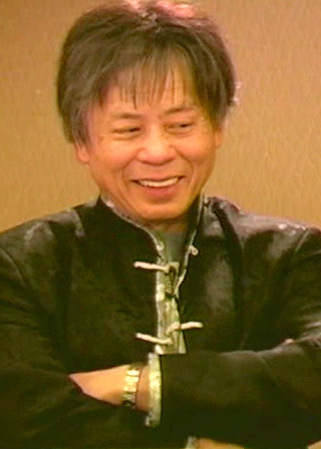
- Born: March 10, 1941; British Hong Kong
- Died: June 24, 2023 (aged 82)
- Education: Manhattan College
- Occupations: Writer, public speaker, doctor of chiropractic, alternative medicine advocate, life consultant
- Known for: Kung Fu expert, consultant and stunt coordinator on Kung Fu
- Website: Yuenmethod.com

Kam Yuen, (simplified Chinese: 金源; pinyin:Jīn yuan; March 10, 1941 – June 24, 2023) was a Chinese-born American martial arts expert who was the consultant and stunt coordinator for the original television series Kung Fu. He also played the roles of Wong Ti and Lin Wu in the series and was the double for Keye Luke, who played Master Po in the series. Yuen was David Carradine's martial arts instructor. He credited Yuen as the inspiration for the series' main character, Kwai Chang Caine; Carradine's book, The Spirit of Shaolin, was dedicated to Kam. A grandmaster of the Tai Mantis style of Shaolin kung fu and known as the "Praying Mantis of North America" for his skill in the fighting style, Yuen's film credits included the role of Red Band in Circle of Iron, co-written by Bruce Lee which was produced posthumously and also stars Carradine, and Project Eliminator.

Yuen graduated from Manhattan College in 1964. A former aerospace engineer, he was also noted for his expertise in tai chi and qigong, as well as feng shui. He authored several books on the subject including Beginning Kung-Fu and Technique and Form of the Three Sectional Staff in Kung Fu (Literary links to the Orient). He is also a 2012 inductee in the Martial Arts History Museum’s Hall of Fame. In addition, World Black Belt has called him a living legend.

He was also a doctor of chiropractic and consulted patients who suffered from chronic pain. His method was initially called Yuen Energetics, but it was changed to the "Yuen Method", co-founded with Marnie Greenberg.According to Yuen and Greenberg, the Yuen Method “relieves pain through feeling for the exact causes of pain… [termed] weaknesses, then strengthening the deletion process for the deletion to take place, ”and the process then resets “the mind, body, spirit”.

Yuen authored several self-help titles on the subject, including Delete Pain and Stress On the Spot (co-authored with Greenberg), The Power of Instant Healing, Instant Rejuvenation and Instant Pain Elimination.

Yuen died on June 24, 2023, at the age of 82.
