= Kung Fu (1972 TV series) =

American martial arts Western series (1972–1975)

- Genre: Action/Adventure; Western; Drama
- Created by: Ed Spielman; Jerry Thorpe; Herman Miller
- Starring: David Carradine; Keye Luke; Philip Ahn; Radames Pera
- Theme music composer: Jim Helms
- Country of origin: United States
- Original language: English
- No. of seasons: 3
- No. of episodes: 62 + pilot (list of episodes)

Production
- Executive producer: Jerry Thorpe
- Camera setup: Single-camera
- Running time: 48–51 minutes
- Production company: Warner Bros. Television

Original release
- Network: ABC
- Release: February 22, 1972
- Release: October 14, 1972 – April 26, 1975

Related
- Kung Fu: The Movie; Kung Fu: The Next Generation; Kung Fu: The Legend Continues; Kung Fu (2021 TV series)

Kung Fu is an American action-adventure martial arts Western drama television series starring David Carradine. The series follows the adventures of Kwai Chang Caine, a Shaolin monk who travels through the American Old West, armed only with his spiritual training and his skill in martial arts, as he seeks his half-brother, Danny Caine.

Many of the aphorisms used in the series are adapted from or derived directly from the Tao Te Ching, a book of ancient Taoist philosophy attributed to the sage Lao-tzu.

== Plot ==
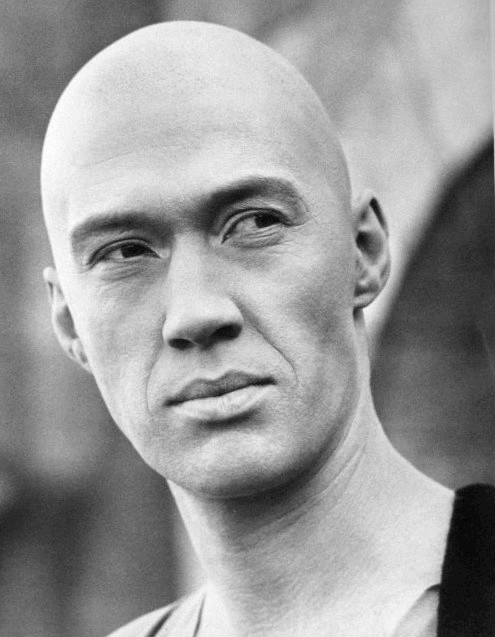
David Carradine as Kwai Chang Caine

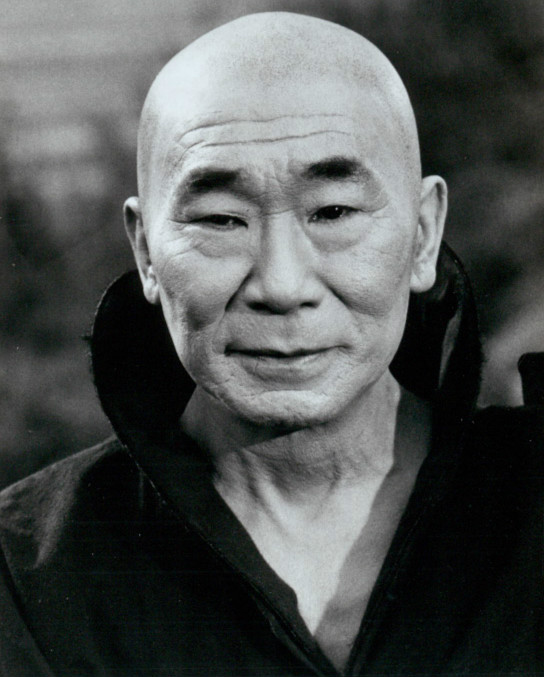
Philip Ahn as Master Kan

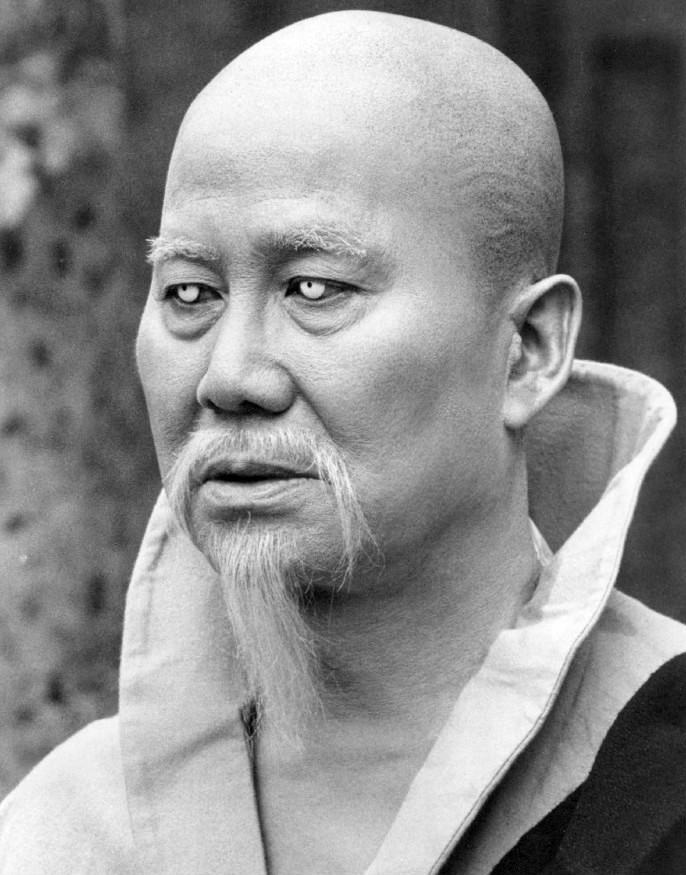
Keye Luke as Master Po

Kwai Chang Caine (David Carradine) is the orphaned son of an American man, Thomas Henry Caine (Bill Fletcher), and a Chinese woman, Kwai Lin, born in mid-19th-century China. After his maternal grandfather's death, he is accepted for training at a Shaolin monastery, where he grows up to become a Shaolin priest and martial-arts expert.

In the pilot episode, Caine's beloved mentor and elder, Master Po, is murdered by the Tongzhi Emperor's nephew with a firearm; outraged, Caine retaliates by killing the emperor's nephew, with everyone unaware that the man was reloading his weapon to attack him again. With a price on his head, Caine flees China to the western United States, where he seeks his family roots, and ultimately, his half-brother, Danny Caine. A recent tombstone dated 1874 in a season-three episode places the stories roughly between 1871 and 1875. In the pilot episode, a telegram dated 21 November 1873 indicates that most of the show's American story begins in November 1873.

Although it is his intention to avoid being noticed, Caine's training and sense of social responsibility repeatedly force him out into the open to fight for justice or protect the innocent. After each encounter, he must move on, both to avoid being captured and to prevent any and all harm from coming to those he has helped. While searching for his family, he meets his grandfather (played by Dean Jagger).

Flashbacks are often used to recall specific lessons from Caine's childhood training at the monastery from his teachers, the blind Master Po (Keye Luke) and Master Chen Ming Kan (Philip Ahn). In those flashbacks, Master Po advises his young student, "Patience, Grasshopper", a nickname given from a playful lesson he taught a young Caine about being aware of the world around him—including the grasshopper that happened to be at his feet at that moment.

During four episodes of the third and final season ("Barbary House", "Flight to Orion", "The Brothers Caine", and "Full Circle"), Caine finds his brother Danny (Tim McIntire) and his nephew Zeke (John Blyth Barrymore).

== Cast ==
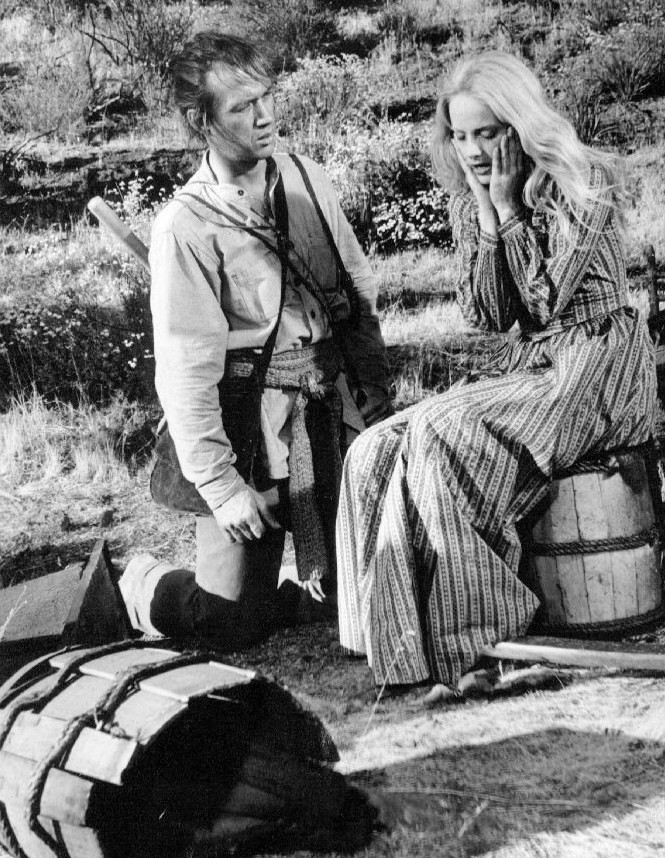
Carradine and guest star Sondra Locke, 1974

=== Regular cast ===
- David Carradine as Kwai Chang Caine (63 episodes)
- Radames Pera as Young Caine (48 episodes)
- Keye Luke as Master Po (48 episodes)
- Philip Ahn as Master Kan (40 episodes)

=== Guest cast ===
This list comprises a selection of actors billed in the opening credits, and some actors whose characters were decisive in the episode plot's development or who later became widely recognized for other productions. Among them are nominees and winners of Academy, Emmy, Golden Globe, Tony, and other film and theater awards. At the minute 6:39 of the Kung Fu DVD documentary The Tao of Caine: Production and Beyond, Herbie J. Pilato says: "One of the great things about Kung Fu is that it had this incredible A-list of guest stars. You know, there were stars then, and they became stars later (...) So, it was a breeding ground for A-1 talent and it was also just surrounded by A-1 talent, I mean, in front of and behind the scenes. They didn't settle for less." Jerry Thorpe added: "People wanted to do the show because it was unique, it's as simple as that. Yes, it was fairly easy to cast people who normally wouldn't do a series television."

This list does not reflect the full extent of Asian-American actors' participation, since most of them were billed in the series' closing credits. A group of Asian actors appeared repeatedly in the series; according to John Furia Jr. in a May 1973 interview, this happened because "one of the problems we're faced with is that Oriental actors did not have much opportunity to act in TV or movies before, and so there is no great pool to draw from. So far, availability of martial artists for the training and fighting scenes has been good." Asian actors who returned often to the series were mostly members of the East West Players, brought to the series by Guy Lee, who later took charge of Bessie Loo's Talent Agency when she retired.

==== Characters played by members of the Carradine family ====
- John Carradine (s1e2, s2e21, s3e23) as Rev. Serenity Johnson
- Keith Carradine (pilot, s1e9) as teenager Caine (uncredited)
- Bruce Carradine (s2e13) as Sheriff, (s3e26) as Capt. Roy Starbuck
- Robert Carradine (s1e2) as Sunny Jim

==== The Caine family ====
- Dean Jagger (s1e2) as Henry Raphael Caine
- Bill Fletcher (s1e11) as Fox, (s3e14) as Thomas Henry Caine
- Tim McIntire (s1e4) as Samuel Buchanan, (s2e1) as Deputy Mitchell, (s3e18–21) as Daniel Caine
- John Blyth Barrymore (s3e18–21) as Zeke Caine
- Stephen Manley (s3e14, s3e16) as Boy Caine

==== Actors appearing in three or more episodes ====
- James Hong (pilot, s2e5, s2e20, s3e3, s3e4, s3e9, s3e22) as miscellaneous characters
- Richard Loo (pilot, s2e7, s2e20, s3e8, s3e11) as various characters
- Victor Sen Yung (pilot, s1e11, s2e5, s2e15, s3e12) as various characters
- Benson Fong (pilot, s1e3, s2e4, s3e13) as various characters
- Clyde Kusatsu (s2e20, s3e1–2, s3e15) as various characters
- Leslie Nielsen (s3e18–21) as Vincent Corbino
- Khigh Dhiegh (s1e10) as Shang Tzu, (s3e10-11) as Sing Lu Chan
- Robert Ito (pilot) as Fong, (s2e2) as Blacksmith/Ninja, (s2e15) as Captain Tim Lee
- Albert Salmi (pilot) as Raif, (s1e7) as Shawn Mulhare, (s3e7) as Reuben Branch
- Soon-Tek Oh (s1e8) as Kwan Chen, (s2e19) as Chen Yi, (s3e8) as Yi Lien
- John Vernon (s3e6) as Forbes, (s3e20–21) as General Cantrell

==== Actors appearing in two episodes ====
- Eddie Albert (s3e1–2) as Dr. George Baxter
- Edward Albert (s3e1–2) as Johnny Kingsley McLean
- John Anderson (s1e3) as Benjamin Dundee, (s2e18) as Jack Youngblood
- Jim Davis (s1e6) as Joe Walker, (s2e1) as Sheriff Grogan
- Howard Duff (s2e14) as Noah Fleck, (s3e4) as Mr. Jenkins
- Dana Elcar (s1e7) as Judge Todd A. Pritikin, (s2e2) as Noah Jones
- Stefan Gierasch (s2e22–23) as Logan McBurney/Kai Tong
- Michael Greene (s1e9) as Huntoon, (s3e12) as Aztec Priest
- Barbara Hershey (s3e10–11) as Nan Chi
- Season Hubley (s3e1–2) as Margit Kingsley McLean
- David Huddleston (s2e9) as Nathaniel, (s3e16) as Shelby Cross
- Scott Hylands (s1e3) as Randy Bucknell, (s2e6) as Saunders
- Roy Jenson (pilot) as Fuller, (s1e12) as Rupp
- L. Q. Jones (s1e4) as Sgt. Straight, (s3e24) as Maj. Clearke Bealson
- Don Keefer (s3e7) as Stripper, (s3e19) as Station Keeper
- Nancy Kwan (s2e22-23) as Mei Li Ho
- A. Martinez (s3a6) as Slade, (s3e21) as Tigre Cantrell
- Mae Mercer (s2e1, s3e24) as Elizabeth Brown
- Patricia Neal (s3e1–2) as Sara Kingsley
- Lois Nettleton (s3e18–19) as Delonia Cantrell
- Shelly Novack (s1e6) as Breck Rankin, (s2e21) as Bascomb
- Michael Pataki (s2e22–23) as Buskirk
- Denver Pyle (s1e15) as Mayor Howard Simms, (s2e18) as Dr. Joseph Colton
- James Shigeta (s3e9) as Master Kwan Li, (s3e15) as Col. Lin Pei
- Barry Sullivan (pilot) as Dillon, (s2e18) as Edwards
- Clare Torao (as Clare Nono) (s2e17) as Cinnamon, (s3e22) as Princess Mei Ming
- Warren Vanders (s1e9) as Sergeant E.T. Bedford, (s2e16) as Clifford Tait
- Hal Williams (s2e1, s3e24) as Caleb Brown
- Anthony Zerbe (s2e10) as Paul Klempt, (s3e5) as Rafe
- Morgan Woodward (s1e8) as Col. Binns, (s2e21) as The Hanged Man

==== Actors appearing in one episode ====
- Cannonball Adderley (s3e17) as Trim Delaville
- Charles Aidman (s3e24) as Dr. Cooper
- Barry Atwater (s2e17) as Kyle Thurmond
- Lew Ayres (s3e13) as Beaumont
- John Drew Barrymore (s2e14) as Alex McGregor
- Fred Beir (s1e14) as Jim Gallagher
- Cal Bellini (s3e5) as Hoskay
- Ramon Bieri (s2e9) as John Bates
- Lane Bradbury (s1e4) as Annie Buchanan
- Wilford Brimley (s3e16) as Blacksmith
- Geraldine Brooks (s1e7) as Widdaw Tackaberry
- Wendell Burton (s1e11) as Martin Crossman
- Gary Busey (s1e15) as Josh
- David Canary (s2e11) as Frank Grogan
- Timothy Carey (s3e23) as Bix Courtney
- Leslie Charleson (s3e16) as Amy Starbuck
- Tina Chen (s1e5) as Su Yen Lu
- Matt Clark (s2e11) as Niebo
- Barbara Colby (s2e21) as Josie
- Brandon Cruz (s1e1) as Peter Gideon
- Ji-Tu Cumbuka (s3e18) as Omar
- Henry Darrow (s2e4) as Don Emilio Fierro
- Rosanna DeSoto (s2e5) as Kiona
- George DiCenzo (s3e5) as Jess
- John Doucette (s1e6) as Ed Rankin
- Diana Douglas (s2e7) as Sister Richardson
- Don Dubbins (s1e12) as Meador
- Andrew Duggan (s1e5) as Sheriff Boggs
- Aimée Eccles (s1e8) as Po Ten
- Jack Elam (s2e5) as Marcus Taylor
- José Feliciano (s3e17) as Jonno Marcado
- Emilio Fernández (s2e4) as Don Carlos de San Martín
- Ed Flanders (s2e9) as Alonzo Davis
- Rhonda Fleming (s3e23) as Jennie Malone
- Harrison Ford (s2e18) as Harrison
- Rosemary Forsyth (s3e3) as Ellie Crowell
- Jodie Foster (s1e10) as Alethea Patricia Ingram
- Robert Foxworth (s2e13) as Captain Clyde McNelly
- Anne Francis (s2e17) as Ida Quinlan
- Victor French (s1e15) as Sheriff Aldon Pool
- Beverly Garland (s3e17) as Theresa Hobart
- Will Geer (s1e15) as Judge Emmitt Marcus
- Chief Dan George (s1e15) as Ancient Warrior
- Lynda Day George (s2e16) as Dora Burnham
- Clu Gulager (s1e3) as Sheriff Rutledge
- Moses Gunn (s1e13) as Isaac Montoya
- Charles Haid (s3e24) as Sheriff
- Richard Hatch (s1e8) as David Binns
- Myron Healey (s2e8) as Capt. Malachy
- Marianna Hill (s2e19) as Louise Coblenz
- Pat Hingle (s1e6) as General Thoms
- Don Johnson (s2e6) as Nashebo
- Nathan Jung (s2e20) as Dark Rider
- James Keach (s2e2) as Abe Jones
- Richard Kelton (s3e6) as Curly Bill Graham
- Evan C. Kim (s3e15) as Lieutenant
- Lloyd Kino (s3e16) as Doctor
- Beverly Kushida (s2e2) as Akiko Swan
- Carol Lawrence (s3e6) as Ada
- Bethel Leslie (s2e19) as Rita Coblenz
- Joycelyne Lew (s2e20) as Kem
- Geoffrey Lewis (s1e9) as Johnson
- Sondra Locke (s3e4) as Gwyneth Jenkins
- William Lucking (s1e13) as Quade
- Barbara Luna (s3e14) as Isela
- Mako (s1e5) as Wong Ti Lu
- Kiel Martin (s1e13) as Marshal
- Tim Matheson (s2e8) as Lt. Bill Wyland
- George Matsui (as Harushi), (s3e22) as Sing Tao
- Wayne Maunder (pilot) as Engineer McKay
- Gary Merrill (s2e15) as Dan Hoyle
- Joanna Moore (s3e20) as Lula Morgan
- Pat Morita (s3e23) as Arthur Chen
- Diana Muldaur (s2e11) as Theodora
- Tom Nardini (s3e13) as Matoska
- Ed Nelson (s1e14) as Sheriff Walter Raha
- Sheree North (s1e14) as Noreen Gallagher
- France Nuyen (s3e3) as Lady Chi Ching
- Merlin Olsen (s1e7) as Perlee Skowrin
- James Olson (s3e9) as Damion
- Judy Pace (s2e16) as Jenny
- Lara Parker (s1e1) as Amy Allender
- Vic Perrin (s1e14) as Eldon Riddle
- Slim Pickens (s2e13) as Bart Fisher
- Stefanie Powers (s3e7) as Edna
- Laurie Prange (s2e10) as Gretchen Klempt
- Andrew Prine (s2e12) as White
- Victoria Racimo (s3e8) as Lady Mei Wu
- Ford Rainey (s1e12) as Jacob Sterne
- Logan Ramsey (s2e5) as Mayor Abel Donaldson
- James Lee Reeves (s2e9) as Andy Dortminder
- Alejandro Rey (s3e14) as Matteo
- Andrew Robinson (s2e18) as Johnny Walker
- Gilbert Roland (s2e3) as Padre Braganza
- Ruth Roman (s2e14) as Rhoda Norman
- Fred Sadoff (s1e12) as Ward Bannack
- Joe Santos (s3e14) as Sanjero
- John Saxon (s1e1) as Raven
- William Schallert (s1e11) as Willis Roper
- William Shatner (s3e3) as Capt. Brandywine Gage
- Gregory Sierra (s1e13) as Zolly
- Howard Da Silva (s2e10) as Otto Schultz
- William Smith (s2e3) as Capt. Luther Staggers
- Don Stroud (s3e7) as Neulin
- Bo Svenson (s2e6) as Pike
- Kenneth Tobey (s1e10) as Sheriff Ingram
- Brian Tochi (s3e12) as Shen Ung
- Harry Townes (s1e4) as Amos Buchanan
- Robert Urich (s1e3) as Greg Dundee
- James Wainwright (s3e6) as Daniel Caine/Luke Askell
- Carl Weathers (s3e20) as Bad Sam
- Fritz Weaver (s2e15) as Hillquist
- Katherine Woodville (s2e12) as Nedra Chamberlain
- Adele Yoshioka (s3e15) as Po Li

David Chow acted as the technical and kung fu advisor, and guest-starred in the pilot as the Little Monk, Caine's enemy at the climactic fight scene. His technical role was later undertaken by Kam Yuen, who guest-starred as Lin Wu in the episode "Blood Brother" and as Wong Ti in the episode "Blood of the Dragon". Part of Chow's job was to add or eliminate fight scenes from the script, "settle differences of opinion" regarding their technical aspects among the martial artists participating in them, and make the scenes believable.

== Production ==
=== Development ===
Kung Fu was created by Ed Spielman and Howard Friedlander, directed and produced by Jerry Thorpe, and developed by Herman Miller, who was also a writer for, and co-producer of, the series. (For the series concept's history, see Bruce Lee's involvement.)

Spielman and Friedlander's 160-page movie script was transformed by Jerry Thorpe and writer Herman Miller into a 90-minute TV movie (with commercial breaks, so it actually amounted to about 75 minutes of screen time). "Since the rule of thumb on a script is that one page equals one minute, the script was literally cut in half."

Directed by Jerry Thorpe, it was broadcast on February 22, 1972, just after the meeting of President Nixon with Chairman Mao, and rerun the following summer, to great acclaim: "(...) ABC and Warner Bros. were deluged with letters, telephone calls, and telegrams, all praising the show." ABC ordered just four more segments and placed them in what was called the "death row", the Saturday-night slot opposite All in the Family, on a monthly basis. Herman Miller developed the pilot into a series by writing the first three episodes, including in the plotline off Caine's search for his missing brother, and giving it a style to which following writers could adhere. After a very positive reception to the first three segments, in November 1972, the network contracted for 12 more episodes, dropped Alias Smith and Jones and placed Kung Fu in the Thursday night slot at 9:00 pm. The resultant good ratings led to the series' renewal for a second season.

The series' story editor was John Furia Jr. At the time a freelance writer for TV and movies who also worked in production, he had declined offers as story editor before, until Jerry Thorpe approached him with Kung Fu. He had seen the pilot and was fascinated by it, so he accepted. The series did not have a stable team of writers, but freelance writers pitched their stories to the production; they were told not to include temple scenes. John Furia's job was to write them and make them relevant to the episode's plot, based on the research material the production had collected.

Furia's job also included "to maintain and preserve historical accuracy in each script. To complicate matters, there is no single historical source on kung-fu upon which he can rely. He must make extensive research into various sources before he can render a story to be within the realms of truth. Furthermore, because the story involves an ethnic group, and the tempers of our time do not tolerate ignorance and bigotry, he must not only make sure that the historical information regarding the group is accurate, but [also] that these people are presented with dignity and respect."

Questioned about whether having a half-Caucasian as a student at the Shaolin Temple (which did not accept foreigners) was historically accurate, John Furia Jr. declared: "There is, of course, a certain amount of dramatic license involved in producing a show of this nature. As for David Carradine playing the part of a half-American, half-Chinese, I can honestly say that we haven't found anyone, before or since the series began, who can play the part better. One of the reasons for the success of the series is Carradine's portrayal of Caine." As for the hiring of Asian actors for the secondary roles, he said: "It not only adds authenticity, it's only proper that it should be so. Our series, I believe, hires more Orientals than any series on TV."

=== Broadcast ===
The series aired on ABC from October 1972 to April 1975 for a total of 63 episodes. The series became one of the most popular television programs of the early 1970s, receiving widespread critical acclaim and commercial success upon its release.

On the week ending May 6, 1973, Kung Fu became the number-one show on American television, drawing a regular audience of 28 million viewers. Around the same time, Bruce Lee's Hollywood debut Enter the Dragon was being completed. It was part of what became known as the "chopsocky" or "kung fu craze" after Hong Kong martial arts films such as Five Fingers of Death (King Boxer) and Bruce Lee's Fists of Fury (The Big Boss) topped the US box office in early 1973.

In its first season, 1972–1973, Kung Fu's pilot was first aired as an ABC Tuesday Movie of the Week, which placed it in the range of the top-20 programs of the season, as determined by Nielsen Media Research. After the pilot's rerun in the summer, during the fall season, three more episodes were aired once a month on Saturday nights, alternating with Alias Smith and Jones, against All in the Family and Bridget Loves Bernie, which were among the top-10 programs of that season. The other 12 episodes ran on Thursday nights, when they ranked among the 30 first-rated shows and tied in ratings with The ABC Monday Night Movie and The F.B.I. during the winter season, losing in ratings to Ironside, which was at the same time slot during the fall and summer seasons.

In its second season, 1973–1974, it ran on Thursday nights, when it remained among the 30 first-rated shows, together with CBS Thursday Night Movie, which was at the same time slot, and tied in ratings with The Carol Burnett Show, which ran on Saturday nights.

In its third and final season, 1974–1975, Kung Fu's time slot changed three times, and it lost its place among the 30 first-rated shows. In the fall, it was moved to Saturdays night at 9:00 pm, against CBS' The Mary Tyler Moore Show and The Bob Newhart Show, sitcoms rated in the top 20 of the season. Between the fall and winter seasons, it ran on Fridays at 8:00 pm, which placed it against NBC's sitcoms Sanford and Son and Chico and the Man, both rated in the Nielsen top five for the season. Then in winter, Kung Fu's time slot changed to Saturdays at 8:00 pm, which placed it against CBS's All in the Family, The Jeffersons (sitcoms rated in the season's top 10), and NBC's Emergency!, a series rated in the top 30 of that season, all of which were at the same time slot.

Contrary to some misconceptions, Kung Fu was not canceled. The series ended due to a combination of factors, among which the documentary The Tao of Caine cites the lead actor's burnout, changes in the writing and shooting that altered some of the most appreciated characteristics of the show, and above all, the changes in the time slot, which led to the audience's decline. However, the most important factor was David Carradine's decision to leave.

Carradine was said to have left the show after sustaining several injuries that made continuing impossible for him. While injuries were a feature of his career, Carradine's decision to quit Kung Fu was influenced by the bad publicity that a drug-related incident attracted on him and which affected the ratings of the series, what Radames Pera described as sabotage. Carradine himself acknowledged that it had been detrimental to audience ratings.

From a broader point of view, Carradine's decision stemmed from the fact that he, from the beginning, had not wanted to commit long-term to a series or stay in it for an extended period, due to his foremost interest in pursuing a career in filmmaking, which he said led him to avoid signing a regular contract that would have bound him for five years. At any rate, Carradine's warning to the production team that the third season was going to be his last one allowed the writers to plan the final episodes so that all of the remaining story arcs regarding Caine and his brother could be brought to a satisfying end. In his commentary to the episode Full Circle, Carradine regretted his decision to leave, because of how that had affected the series' crew.

Kung Fu started to broadcast in syndication on September 1, 1979, on 23 local channels.

The series was later broadcast on cable television by the TNT channel, on weeknights at 7:00, ET.

=== International broadcast ===
This series was internationally broadcast in its original run, later distributed in DVD format, has been rebroadcast in cable channels specialized on vintage TV shows like TCM Latin America; it is also available for streaming.

- Argentina
- Australia
- Austria
- Belgium – 1974
- Brazil – DVD premiere, 2005
- Canada – DVD premiere, 2007
- Chile – Televisión Nacional de Chile, dubbed version
- Costa Rica – Telecentro, dubbed version
- Ecuador – Ecuavisa, dubbed version
- France – 1974
- Greece
- Italy – Canale 5, 1983
- Japan
- Mexico
- Netherlands – 1974
- New Zealand – Jones!
- Peru – Panamericana Televisión, dubbed version
- Soviet Union
- Spain – Dubbed version
- Sri Lanka – with subtitles
- Turkey – Dubbed version
- United Kingdom
- Uruguay – Dubbed version
- West Germany – 1975

=== Sets ===
The series was filmed at the Warner Bros. Studios, Burbank (Laramie Street, the Backlot, and several stages), Old Tucson Studios, and on locations like Vasquez Rocks, the 20th Century Fox Ranch (Malibu Creek State Park), and the sand dunes in the Yuma Desert for the opening and closing credits.

The Shaolin Monastery that appeared in flashbacks was originally a set used for the 1967 film Camelot. It was inexpensively and effectively converted for the setting in China, by Academy Award nominee Eugène Lourié as art director; the set decorator was Academy Award nominee Ralph S. Hurst.

Even if Camelot won an Academy Award for its art direction and set decoration, the expensive castle (made with wooden beams, wooden frame structures, and building timber covered with faux stone siding) was criticized for its unspecific style placed in a landscape evidently Californian, which resulted in that castle being the last attempt for a studio to construct a large-scale set that represented a foreign location. By November 1971, when Jerry Thorpe asked Eugène Lourié to design the art for Kung Fu, the castle was derelict to the point that Lourié believed that it still stood only because the cost of demolishing it would be prohibitive.

Working with the reduced budget of a TV production was a challenge, but Lourié had learned in France how to work with little money for sets. He was both interested and intrigued by the story, as the action moved back and forth between the Wild West's present and the memories of the Shaolin temple. Lourié decided to emphasize that contrast visually. The practical need for making the project monetarily viable meant style compromises.

With that in mind, the castle's nonspecific architectural style was perfect to give it a Chinese look for Western eyes, by adding characteristic roofs, a front wall with a massive wood-carved door, and brick walls with ceramic-grilled windows, while its terraces and stairs were fit for the stagings of the kung fu training sequences. For the temple's interiors, Lourié opted for showing only a portion of the set and let the viewers complete it in their minds. He decided on a church-like appearance, with a Buddhist mural on the back wall, multileveled wooden candleholders and burning candles between columns, a constant haze, and the projection of strong rays of light as if coming through high church windows.

That visual conception made building long and high stone walls for those sets unnecessary, especially because the studio offered Kung Fu a large stage on which was a standing set of the big hall from Camelot. That presented the advantage of ready-made stone walls if the side wings of the temple were to appear in a take. The scenes among the flickering candles became a signature of the series. For other Chinese sets, he used carved wooden partitions to enhance plain walls, or giant sculptured lions to give simple gardens an aura of grandeur.

For the railroad camp location, a place close to Hollywood was needed, so the well-known Vasquez Rocks location was chosen. As for the Western scenes, the old Western streets on the Warner Bros. lot were easily adaptable to the series' multiple requirements. Lourié's solution of the temple and the other sets both in budgetary and visual terms was key in getting the go-ahead for the movie pilot from the production department, and for the subsequent series.

In his memoir, Eugène Lourié praises Jerry Thorpe's vision, courage, and inventiveness to undertake the Kung Fu project with a reduced TV budget. At minute 4:32 of the documentary The Tao of Caine, Jerry Thorpe says about him: "The art director, Eugène Lourié, his talents were unending. He converted a medieval castle that had been built for Camelot on the backlot into an AD second- to third-century Shaolin monastery, for a buck and a quarter. He cannibalized every scene dock in the industry. It was amazing to watch."

The Camelot Castle, already converted into a Shaolin temple and with some additions, became a main set for the 1973 musical Lost Horizon during its 1972 April to June shooting period.

From late 1972 to early 1975, it became again a Shaolin temple while the Kung Fu episodes were in production, with Emmy Award winner Antony Mondello and John Lamphear as set decorators.

When visiting the backlot in 1980, Lourié was sorry to find out that a large number of the Western streets had been bulldozed. As for the imposing castle/temple/lamasery, it lasted for a few more years until it was torn down and substituted by a parking lot and the Bridge offices building (1994).

=== Special effects ===
The series used slow-motion effects for the action sequences, which Warner Bros. had previously used in the 1969 Sam Peckinpah film The Wild Bunch, and were also subsequently used for the action sequences in the science-fiction series The Six Million Dollar Man.

=== Soundtrack ===
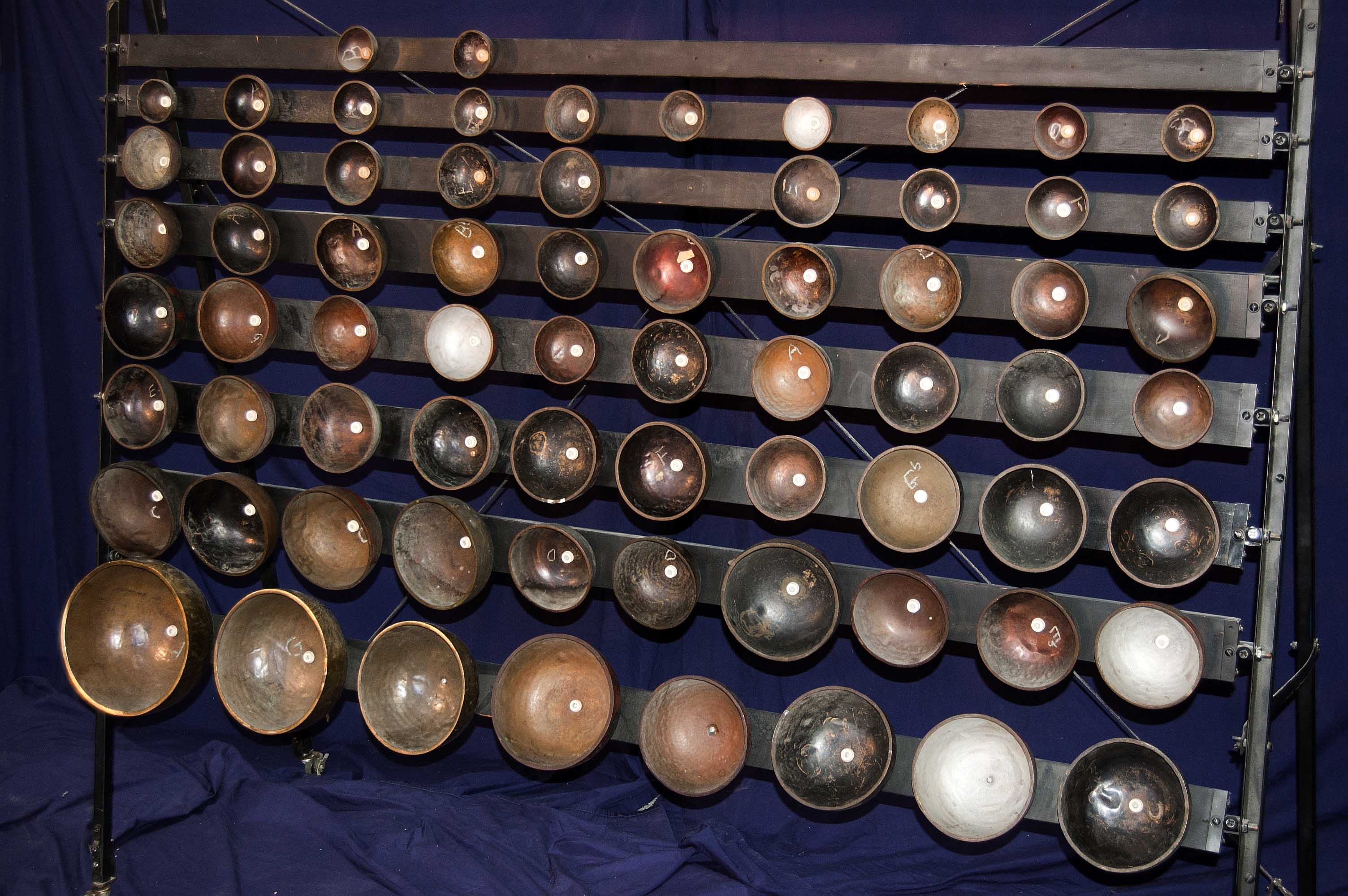
Dharma bells (from Emil Richards Collection)

The music for the opening and closing titles, as well as the incidental music, was composed by Jim Helms. Series associate producer (later producer) Alex Beaton selected him after listening to several composer demonstration tapes when the pilot was in development. Helms, a guitarist and arranger, scored the pilot with a team of only 11 musicians. The result was mostly atmospheric instead of melodic, with a koto as the predominant instrument. This score did not include "Caine's Theme", which was added when the series began airing in 1972, in the opening and closing titles. That signature theme had two unusual characteristics; through the first season, it was revised and re-recorded several times, and the sound palette comprised about 19 musicians per session only. Even if half of them were string players, the woodwinds, keyboard, and percussion sounds were always more prominent.

The flute themes were performed by Sheridon Stokes on an alto recorder, since the type of bamboo flute featured in the series was not chromatic and was deemed impractical for scoring purposes. The constant presence of a harpsichord played by Mike Lang helped to set the series in the 19th century. The percussion instruments included a waterphone, Chinese tom-toms, Chinese opera bells, woodblocks, and antique Chinese "dharma bells" (Asian nested bells). Percussionist Emil Richards collected over 90 of them and used them often for microtonal glisses. Everything resulted in an Eastern-Western combination that was unique in American television. Variety referred to Helms' work as "especially interesting... sensitive... a decided asset."

Given the success of Kung Fu's first season, Warner Bros. Records released internationally in December 1973 a "concept album" of dialogue and music from the show, based on the pilot and the first nine episodes; "Caine's Theme" was also released as a single. The record used an expanded 45-piece orchestra for the musical selections and a group of eight musicians for the incidental music underscoring dialogue taken from the Shaolin temple sequences. The LP was re-released in CD format in 2010, accompanied by the Man in the Wilderness movie soundtrack.

"Caine's Theme" (with different arrangements) was included in the TV and film music compilations by Jack Hawkins and his Orchestra and Singers (UK, 1974), Jack Parnell and his Orchestra (UK, 1975), and The Film Studio Orchestra (Japan, 1976).

== Question of Bruce Lee's involvement ==
In her memoirs, Bruce Lee's widow, Linda Lee Cadwell, asserts that Lee created the concept for the series, which was then stolen by Warner Bros.: "Even before this [Longstreet], Warner Bros. had suddenly caught on to the fact that kung fu itself had captured the public's imagination and decided to launch a TV series," she writes. "Bruce himself had been working on the idea of a Shaolin priest, a master of kung fu, who would roam America and find himself involved in various exploits. The studio contacted him, and he was soon deeply involved. He gave them numerous ideas, many of which were eventually incorporated in the resulting TV success, Kung Fu, starring actor David Carradine." (Linda Lee, The Man Only I Knew, pp. 130–31.). Some circumstantial evidence exists for this in a December 8, 1971, television interview that Bruce Lee gave on The Pierre Berton Show. In the interview, Lee stated that he had developed a concept for a television series called The Warrior, meant to star himself, about a martial artist in the American Old West (the same concept as Kung Fu, which aired the following year), but that he was having trouble pitching it to Warner Bros. and Paramount.

In the interview, Pierre Berton commented, "There's a pretty good chance that you'll get a TV series in the States called 'The Warrior', in it, where you use what, the Martial Arts in Western setting?"

Lee responded, "That was the original idea, ...both of them [Warner and Paramount], I think, they want me to be in a modernized type of a thing, and they think that the Western type of thing is out. Whereas I want to do the Western. Because, you see, how else can you justify all of the punching and kicking and violence, except in the period of the West?"

Later in the interview, Berton asked Lee about "the problems that you face as a Chinese hero in an American series. Have people come up in the industry and said 'well, we don't know how the audience are going to take a non-American'?"

Lee replied, "Well, such question has been raised, in fact, it is being discussed. That is why The Warrior is probably not going to be on." Lee adds, "They think that business-wise it is a risk. I don't blame them. If the situation were reversed, and an American star were to come to Hong Kong, and I was the man with the money, I would have my own concerns as to whether the acceptance would be there."

However, Bruce Lee was undoubtedly considered for the starring role, and David Carradine himself in a 1989 interview and in his book Spirit of Shaolin, said that Bruce Lee was passed over for the role. It is alleged that an unnamed ABC executive said "You can't make a star out of a five-foot-six Chinese actor."

According to biographer Matthew Polly, Bruce Lee did not invent the Kung Fu TV series. Ed Spielman created the character of Kwai Chang Caine, and the movie treatment Spielman wrote with Howard Friedlander in 1969 was the origin of the pilot and subsequent series.

Spielman first wrote a treatment about a samurai who travels to China and learns kung fu. Around 1967, he gave it to his partner Howard Friedlander, who suggested turning it into a Western; Spielman then decided to make the leading character into a half-American, half-Chinese Shaolin monk. In 1969, William Morris agent Peter Lampack put the treatment into the knowledge of Fred Weintraub, at the time an executive at Warner Bros. and later the producer of Enter the Dragon: "As a New York-based production executive at Warner Bros. Pictures, it was my job to develop projects to appeal to the youth market. From the mountain of potential projects sent to me weekly, I unearthed a treatment for a feature-length film by a couple of writers named Ed Spielman and Howard Friedlander called The Way of the Tiger, The Sign of the Dragon. It was an intriguing East-meets-Western tale of a young Shaolin monk from China roaming the American West of the 1800s, righting wrongs with pacifist, Eastern philosophy. And if that failed, kicking serious cowboy butt with nothing but his hands and feet. I liked the idea and gave the boys something like $3,800 to write a screenplay. At about that time, Warner Bros. made the decision to change their base of operations and moved me from New York to Hollywood." He received the finished script on April 30, 1970. Later through his friend Sy Weintraub (no relation), Weintraub met Bruce Lee and considering him ideal for the part tried to put the script into development with him as the leading actor, but was rejected. According to Howard Friedlander, the film was to be filmed in Durango, Mexico, for the Western scenes, and Taiwan for the Chinese scenes. Its budget had been calculated as $18 million (over $124 million in 2022 dollars). Friedlander blamed the arrival of Richard D. Zanuck and David Brown as senior executives at Warners Bros. for the cancellation of the movie project, because "the general consensus was that the public would not be willing to accept a Chinese hero."

While Bruce Lee was in Thailand filming The Big Boss, Weintraub brought the script to Tom Kuhn, head of the Warner Bros. TV division, who liked it. Warner Bros. and ABC announced their TV deal for Kung Fu on July 22, 1971, and started preproduction (including casting). The air date was scheduled for February 22, 1972, with production starting on December 15, 1971. Bruce Lee, having arrived back from Thailand, auditioned for the part of Caine, but the studio was reluctant to hire a Chinese actor, having concerns with his accent, his intense personality, considered not suitable to portray a quiet, serene character, and also because he was "too authentic".

In early October 1971, a month before Warner Bros. officially designated David Carradine for the role of Caine, Warner Bros. executive Ted Ashley, who saw Bruce Lee's potential and did not want to lose him to Paramount, offered him an exclusive development deal to create his own TV program, which included an advance of "$25,000 (or $152,000 in 2017 dollars) - enough money to pay off most of his mortgage." Bruce Lee presented a treatment describing a show called Ah Sahm, which he later retitled The Warrior. Bruce Lee did not sign Ashley's deal, preferring to see how The Big Boss performed in theaters. When the movie was a smashing success, he abandoned his plans to be a TV star and instead focused on the big screen. (Note: This section follows mostly Richard Bejtlich's Martial Journal magazine article, which offers the clearest and most succinct chronology of the events. All sources coincide in the Spielman-Friedlander authorship of the Kung Fu story idea, and that Fred Weintraub bought their finished movie script for Warner Bros. Regarding exactly who was the first person to get interested in the movie treatment, who was the Warner Bros. executive who carried the movie script to the Television Division and then to ABC, and who was the person ultimately responsible for its development into a TV series, the sources offer varied versions: Mr. Bejtlich based his article chiefly on Matthew Polly's Bruce Lee biography, which in turn relies on Tom Kuhn and Fred Weintraub's testimonies. In his memoir, Fred Weintraub credits himself only, although he says he talked about the script project with Rudi Fehr, at the time Warner Bros. head of post-production.; On min. 2:18 of From Grasshopper to Caine, Tom Kuhn (former vice president of Warner Bros. Television) says a "very large man" threw a script on his desk and said, "the movie guys don't want to do this, I thought maybe you'd like to have it." In the documentary as it is edited, Kuhn does not say who the man was.; On page 321 of Matthew Polly's Bruce Lee biography, the exact same situation is described by Kuhn, identifying the "huge guy" as Fred Weintraub, who according to Polly, presented the script to Kuhn on his own initiative, unhelped. In a note on page 557, Polly credits Bennett Sims (at the time a junior executive for Warner Bros.) for having been the first one to read the treatment and passing it to his boss Fred Weintraub (not the younger novelist Sims, but Bennett Byron Sims 1933–2002, whose obituary mentions this connection with Kung Fu.) It must be noticed too that in Polly's book it is said that Peter Lampack, the agent who was promoting the treatment, took 50 rejections before having it accepted by Fred Weintraub.; In Ed Spielman's IMDb biography, it is said that Fred Weintraub and Warner Bros. studio executive Harvey Frand took the movie script to ABC, where it was accepted to be a Movie of the Week. The source for this biography appears to be a Herbie J. Pilato's article at TVWriter.Com.; On page 15 of his book, Herbie J. Pilato credits Harvey Frand ("who served as liaison between the television and motion picture departments at Warner Bros.") for reading the movie script (already in the possession of Warner Bros.), presenting it to the television division, pitching it in-person to ABC, and closing the deal. On page 16 Pilato adds that Jerry Thorpe "came across" the script, and with the help of Herman Miller transformed it into a television script.; On page 16 of his book, Robert Anderson gives a briefer exposition of Pilato's version, with the small difference of saying that Jerry Thorpe "soon became attached to the project."; Other than quotes from Pilato's book and article, no online source connects Harvey Frand with Kung Fu's creation. The main source in Pilato's work about Frand's involvement seems to be Frand himself. On page 55 of Richard Meyers' book Films of Fury, Frand is mentioned as saying he was the one who had to tell Bruce Lee he hadn't been cast as the series lead, in-person. Despite chronological mistakes (it says Enter the Dragon, released in August 1973 in the USA, was already a success when Kung Fu's pilot was in pre-production, what was in late 1971), the history of the series' creation in that book is essentially the same as in the other sources.; On min. 4:08 of From Grasshopper to Caine, John Furia says that he, Tom Kuhn, and "Jerry" went to New York to pitch the series to Martin Starger, ABC's president, who approved it. Tom Kuhn adds that he and Jerry Leider (then President of Warner Bros. Television) knew Barry Diller (Vice President of Development at ABC, creator of the ABC Movie of the Week), and trusted the "young hotshot" was going to look at the material and say, "this is something different", and that he would get them the order for a TV movie, despite having a "non-American white guy" leading character. He did, but it took some time. So, in the documentary, there are Jerry Thorpe and Jerry Leider, but neither Fred Weintraub nor Harvey Frand is mentioned.; On min. 6:13, director John Badham says that "Jerry" wanted Bruce Lee to play the leading role in the series. The sources referenced in the section say that it was Fred Weintraub who lobbied for Lee, and all the sources including the documentary say that Jerry Thorpe preferred David Carradine above all candidates notwithstanding his problematic behavior, as much as it was Thorpe who set the standards for the series' directing and looks.; David Carradine used to say that Fred Weintraub bought the script and it was left on a shelf until Jerry Thorpe found it.; In his memoir, Eugène Lourié credited and praised Jerry Thorpe for his vision and courage to take a shelved movie script and make it into a TV film with a reduced budget (From $18 to $1 million, according to Pilato, p.16). He doesn't mention any other Warner Bros. executive.; It must be pointed out that the sale of the movie treatment and first script happened in New York, all the exchanges at Warner Bros. happened in Los Angeles, and the final deal with ABC was back in New York, all in the course of several years. On pages 308–309 of Polly's book, Howard Friedlander says he came to know of the ABC television deal for the script while in New York, through an article in Variety. Therefore, according to the varied testimonies in this note, it can be said that the process to bring Kung Fu from treatment to movie script to television series was a lengthy and complicated one, Fred Weintraub was fundamental at its conception, there were several executives at Warner Bros. assisting in its birth, and Jerry Thorpe had a decisive agency in what it came to be.) Decades later in 2019, Lee's series concept would be produced as Warrior on Cinemax.

== Casting controversy ==
Kung Fu has been called an example of yellowface and a prominent case of whitewashing.

Most of the controversy lies in the allegation that the series' idea was stolen from Bruce Lee, but also in the fact that he was not cast for the leading role, and that decision had racial connotations. The "steal" theory has become widespread, both in academia and in the media, even internationally.

The casting for the leading role when the project was still a feature film had considered (among others) James Coburn, who was preferred by Ed Spielman. When the script became an ABC Movie of the Week, the casting process considered (among others) Bruce Lee, Mako, and George Takei. After having "sought every Asian in Hollywood, because you didn't have to be super bright to know what was coming," and found none that could carry the series, they turned to the American side of the character and began auditioning white actors, including William Smith and John Saxon. Just two weeks before the pilot's filming started, David Carradine obtained the role at his second audition.

At the time, George Takei and the Association of Asian Pacific American Artists (AAPAA) filed a formal complaint for unfair hiring practices. They wanted an Asian actor in the leading role and a Chinese historical advisor; only the second demand was conceded. The Asian acting community was initially displeased, but with so few opportunities for Asian actors at the time, many felt it was better to have a successful show that could be a steady source of work for them in secondary roles than having none at all. Actor James Hong (who was the AAPAA's president), said: "As the show went on, we realized it was a great source of employment for the Asian acting community."

=== Representation of women and ethnic groups ===
The series has been considered a commentary on race relations in the 1970s, both for its casting as for the depiction of discrimination against minorities. It is noteworthy that race issues also affected the casting of secondary characters whereas gender inequality showed in their stories.

France Nuyen and Nancy Kwan, both Eurasian, played Chinese characters, the first one accepting being given in marriage as payment for service her husband was hired to perform (s3e3), the other one preferring to be a concubine to the emperor rather than the wife of the warlord who had raped her, who was played by Stefan Gierasch, wearing prosthetic makeup (s2e22–23). Barbara Hershey appeared as a Eurasian woman who flees forced marriage to a warlord played by Khigh Dhiegh (born Kenneth Dickerson), and is denied admission to the Shaolin temple as a student because "You are female – You are also of mixed blood" (s3e10–11). On the other hand, American women are sometimes portrayed as dependent upon or even unable to survive without men (s1e14, s2e16, s3e4), but also as independent individuals, like entrepreneurs (s3e23), landowners (s2e14, s3e1–2), ranchers (s2e12, s3e3) or craftswomen (s1e3), according to the feminist currents of the time. Notably, Asian women are portrayed that way on occasion (s1e5, s1e8), and not just in stereotypical or subservient roles.

Given that the series' action happens mostly in the 19th century California, black people appear as important characters in just a few episodes (s1e13, s2e1, s2e16, s3e18, s3e24), as at the time they were a small portion of the state's population, yet all of the episodes have to do with them facing discrimination. Interestingly, when the consequences of the American Civil War are mentioned, they are in the context of defeat and vengeance (s1e4, s2e3, s3e24), not of the abolition of slavery.

Regarding Native Americans, as it was usual at the time, they are mostly portrayed by non-Native actors, usually from the Hispanic community and also by Whites (s2e6), whereas the Hispanics themselves appear mostly when Caine visits towns in New Mexico or Mexico (s2e3, s2e4, s3e14), even if at the time there was an important Hispanic presence in the state. The portrayal of Native Americans varies from the stereotypical faceless villains (s1e1, s1e2), to objects of persecution and discrimination (s2e5, s3e5) to a co-leading character in the s1e15 episode "The Ancient Warrior," the only one with a Native actor billed in the opening credits, which precisely deals with the extermination of a whole tribe. The absence of Native actors and the cultural misrepresentation issue wasn't unique to this series nor to its time; it has led the National Congress of American Indians to pass a resolution on the subject as recently as 2017.

=== Representation of Asians ===
East Asian, or rather Chinese portrayal in the series remains a topic of discussion. Academic studies tend to mention the show in the context of discrimination against Asians in American society and entertainment.

Professor Jun Xing (Chun Hsing in Library of Congress' cataloging) states that segregating actors by roles seems reasonable when ethnic characters are cast, but there is a double standard in which Asians cannot play roles designated as White, whereas Caucasian actors cross into ones representing every other race, showing that in movies American people are not every color, but Black and White. Also, as there is an East–West dichotomy; Asians are not seen as Americans. With that in mind, to maintain the double standard, "Eurasian characters have become Hollywood's favorite creations. These mixed-race characters obviously allow white actors and actresses, with minimum makeup, to steal major roles from Asians." And puts Kung Fu as the "best example" of that, noting Bruce Lee's involvement.

Professor Hye Seung Chung exemplifies Asian representation in American film and television, and the roles Asian actors were allowed to play, with the case of Philip Ahn, who, being the son of a Korean national hero, spent his career playing minor and secondary characters, usually Japanese and Chinese. On page 31, she compares a letter from an admirer of Ahn's work as Master Kan with playwright Frank Chin's attack on the series in a 1974 The New York Times article, when he states that apes' roles in movies had evolved better than Chinese images in media. Even if Professor Chung states on page 177 that "Kung Fu was a groundbreaking series produced by Warner Bros. that intermixed the martial arts genre with Wild West iconography, expanding the syntax of the television western to accommodate "foreign" elements at the scenographic and narrative levels," her analysis decries the way the Kan character is depicted as "emasculated," stereotyped in various ways, and she mentions that Bruce Lee was not cast in the leading role.

Also, the series itself lacks historical and cultural accuracy in this matter. Through the episodes, the writers made mistakes regarding the order of Chinese names, and about who was the Emperor in China at the series' time period. When Japanese elements appear, they are unlikely to be known or happen at the said time: in s3e12, the boy Caine watches a Noh performance in a mandarin's mansion, when Japan was still an isolationist country. In s2e2, among three Japanese characters, there is a woman who has been married to an Englishman for over 15 years, when British subjects had been allowed to reside in Japan only since 1862–1863; also Caine knows well what a ninja is, just ten years after Japan's opening to international relations. Most importantly, the series' Shaolin priests teach Taoist and Confucian philosophy, whereas the actual Shaolin monks are Buddhist. However, the absence of allusions to Joseon Korea is correct, as immigrants from that kingdom arrived in America after 1884.

Another issue that has come under the scrutiny of academia and the media, which is not exclusive to this series, is the fact that Asian actors of several nationalities and ethnicities appeared in the Kung Fu main or guest cast playing Chinese characters, "interchangeably". Professor Chung on page 16-17 exemplifies this situation that Asian actors in the American entertainment industry face with the careers of two Kung Fu cast members, Philip Ahn (Korean) and Richard Loo (Hawaii-born Chinese American) who so often played Japanese villains in war movies that international magazine articles about them confused their pictures: "This confusion speaks to the interchangeability of Asian actors, regardless of nationality and ethnicity, which was fostered by an industry insensitive to the diversities and differences within the same racial group." In an early article about the series, both actors are referred to and they call their characters "Orientals". Professors Kent A. Ono and Vincent N. Pham call that perceived interchangeability "implicit yellowface". It is a problem that, together with whitewashing has continued into present times and is noticed internationally. Regarding this "interchangeability" issue, given the historic period in which Kung Fu is set, Koreans couldn't have appeared, and Japanese perhaps shouldn't have, as in the 1870s' America there were just 55 Japanese immigrants registered. Yet in the episode s2e2 it is established through dialogue, costume, and cultural details that the Japanese are not the same as Chinese, and they are played by actors of Japanese ancestry.

Radames Pera, who played young Caine, mentioned in 2021, "They did the best they could at the time...They were taking heat from the Asian community from the onset. So they actually made a deal with some of the representatives from Asian American community to hire everybody in town, whether they were Korean, Japanese, Chinese, or Filipino who had a SAG card. They also gave cards to those who didn't have one by giving them their first job in a union production. Literally every Asian actor in town worked on that show."

=== Recapitulation ===
"'That guy is me,' Spielman says. 'That Caine character is me in a way, just like Siegel and Shuster did Superman. He was always Eurasian; he always didn't fit in.'" So, according to its creator, it was not a maneuver that would make it fit for a White actor, even if his first choice for the role had been James Coburn. Regarding the casting process, the production team says they did try to cast an Asian actor but none was adequate for the role, including Bruce Lee. John Furia Jr. asserted that "the concept of the series was a man who was not involved, a man who avoided action at almost any cost, a very quiet, seemingly passive man." Tom Kuhn, besides claiming that Lee's speech was hard to understand, said: "It did occur to me that this part was rather cerebral, a guy who only fights when he's absolutely cornered." Even Fred Weintraub, who had lobbied for Lee since the beginning, noted that they needed an actor "to portray the sense of quiet serenity that Caine possessed, a quality that driven and intense Bruce was not known for." Still, both Kuhn and Weintraub admitted that "the powers that be" were unwilling to hire an Asian actor per se.

Academic studies about Asian representation in American entertainment claim that the casting of the leading role and even the portrayal of the Chinese characters by Asian actors followed generalized discriminatory patterns. Put in a historical context in which White actors were free to play Asian, Eurasian and other ethnicities' roles, whereas Asian, Eurasian and mixed-race actors played the stereotypical Asian roles left but never White roles, anti-miscegenation laws had been repealed just in 1967, the Hays Code finally abandoned in 1968, and whitewashing has continued into the 21st century, their authors simply can't believe that the casting of a White actor for a Eurasian role in 1971 could have had any other cause than inveterate racism, much less when Bruce Lee was involved.

The media continues to list this show as racist, not for its contents but because future star Bruce Lee wasn't cast in a role that perhaps wasn't suited for him, as an actor, in November–December 1971, and because of the rooted belief that the idea for the series was "stolen" from him.

In consequence, the new show takes the name of the original one while completely separating itself from it, instead of continuing its story or attempting to build upon its legacy, claiming with good reason that their aim is improving Asian community's representation and visibility.

Interestingly, in the s1e3 episode "Blood Brother," Kwai Chang Caine pleads for his compatriots to do that, as a matter of life and death.

(Caine has uncovered a hate crime against an old condisciple. An inquest ensues, which could lead to a possible, but unlikely indictment. Caine urges a Chinese man who has been assaulted by the murderers to present himself at the proceeding.)

"Have you learned nothing?"
"You are new to this country. You must understand. No jury will indict a white man for what has been done to one of our people."
"Yet you must appear... If you stay away, it will be an acceptance of things as they are. If you appear at the inquest your very presence will be a demand for justice. The presence of your son, your wife, and your daughter, will be worth even more."
"You ask me to subject my family to shame? To hurt? For what reason?"
"How can they find safety in a fortress whose walls will burn; whose windows cannot stop a bullet; whose doors will yield to anyone with the strength to force them? How can you hide, when the more you remain unseen, the more they will feel free to seek you out?"

Placed in a turning point of the history of American society and television, being the last show in American television with a leading character in yellowface, obscures what the show did accomplish. In a time when Asian actors were largely ignored, and usually played minor and openly stereotypical roles, Kung Fu was exceptional for consistently presenting them as not stereotypical characters and for being a steady job source for Asian actors, which was acknowledged by members of the cast and the AAPAA's president James Hong. The episodes s3e8, s3e10–11, s3e15 and s3e22, set in China, had a mostly Asian American cast. Also, the show was clear in denouncing anti-Chinese racism, including hate crimes (s1e3), and pointed at historical events ignored in popular culture, like the Page Act of 1875 that basically forbade the immigration of East Asian women (s1e8), or the harsh labor conditions of the Chinese immigrants who built the transcontinental railroad (pilot, s3e9). Despite its historical inaccuracies, the series' dialogue was greatly based on Chinese philosophy, which gave viewers an introduction to its spiritual values, and its dramatic appeal made it the recipient of international accolades.

== Episodes ==
Season	Episodes	Originally released	
Season	Episodes	First released	Last released
Pilot movie		February 22, 1972	
1	15	October 14, 1972	May 3, 1973
2	23	September 27, 1973	April 11, 1974
3	24	September 14, 1974	April 26, 1975

== Reception ==
=== Critical response ===
Rotten Tomatoes calls the series "influential", and Metacritic in describing it says: "A man of peace, though trained to defend himself, Caine always made an attempt to address situations in a way that was morally acceptable to his beliefs, and to resolve them through [the] least violent means possible. His journey is not only one across the frontier of America but one through the light and dark areas of the soul as well."

In a May 1973 Black Belt magazine interview with John Furia Jr., the author Jon Shirota speaks about the critical response in these terms: "Even the TV critics, customarily very reserved and cautious with their appraisals, acclaimed the show [the first segment] as one of the year's best. (...) One critic wrote that the success of Kung-Fu may be attributed to the very thing the producers were afraid of: the public's not knowing what the series was about. 'Actually,' said the critic, 'it adds a certain amount of unpredictability and suspense to the plot. It is unlike most of the western heroes whose faces are like the book you've already read.' Another critic said that a story like Kung-Fu could never have been made into a movie 10 years ago because no one would have cared about a bunch of coolies. 'It is only now,' he quipped, 'that we are giving true credit to history.'"

=== Accolades ===
Award nominations and accolades for Kung Fu
Year	Nominated work	Category	Award	Result	Notes	Ref.
1972	Frank Westmore, for ABC Movie of the Week (pilot)	Outstanding Makeup for a Single-Camera Series (Non-Prosthetic)	Primetime Emmy Award	Won		
1973	Kung Fu: Pilot Television Movie	Best Television Film	Golden Globe Awards	Nominated		
1973	Jerry Thorpe, episode "An Eye for an Eye".	Best Director – Drama Series	Primetime Emmy Award	Won		
1973	Jack Woolf, episode "An Eye for an Eye".	Best Cinematography – One Hour Drama	Primetime Emmy Award	Won		
1973	Herman Miller, episode "King of the Mountain"	Writers Guild of America Award for Television: Episodic Drama	Writers Guild of America Award	Won		
1973	David Carradine, Best Television Actor – Drama Series	Best Actor – Television Series Drama	Golden Globe Awards	Nominated		
1973	David Carradine, Outstanding Continued Performance by an Actor in a Leading Role (Drama Series – Continuing)	Outstanding Lead Actor in a Drama Series	Primetime Emmy Award	Nominated		
1973	Jerry Thorpe, Outstanding Drama Series – Continuing	Outstanding Drama Series	Primetime Emmy Award	Nominated	For Kung Fu	
1973	Jerry Thorpe, Outstanding New Series	Outstanding New Series	Primetime Emmy Award	Nominated		
1973	Frank Westmore, Outstanding Achievement in Makeup	Outstanding Makeup (Non-Prosthetic)	Primetime Emmy Award	Nominated		
1973	David Carradine, Mejor Actor Extranjero	Best Foreign Actor	Teleprograma magazine, Spain	Won	Delivered in 1974	
1973	Kung Fu (David Carradine), Personaje más popular	Most Popular Character	Teleprograma magazine, Spain	Nominated	Delivered in 1974	
1973	Kung Fu, Mejor Serie Extranjera	Best Foreign Series	Teleprograma magazine, Spain	Nominated	Delivered in 1974	
1974	Joseph Dervin, Best Edited Episode for a Television Series	Best Edited Drama Series for Commercial Television	American Cinema Editors	Nominated	For episode "The Chalice"	
1974	Melhor Programa de TV	Best Television Program	Troféu Imprensa, Brasil	Nominated	Official website.	
1975	Lew Ayres, Outstanding Single Performance by a Supporting Actor in a Comedy or Drama Series	Outstanding Supporting Actor in a Drama Series	Primetime Emmy Award	Nominated	Episode: "The Vanishing Image"	
1977	Melhor Série	Best Series	Troféu Imprensa, Brasil	Nominated	Official website.	

== Home media ==
Warner Home Video released the entire series on DVD in Region 1 between 2004 and 2005.

On November 14, 2017, Warner Home Video re-released all three seasons, as well as the complete series set on DVD in Region 1.

The extras include audio commentary by David Carradine on four episodes of the series (s2e1 The Well, s2e14 A Dream Within a Dream, s3e2 Blood of the Dragon - 2, s3e21 Full Circle), Zen & Now: A Dinner With David Carradine And Friends (Guests: Hal Sparks, Sifu Rob Moses, Vivica A. Fox, Kam Yuen, Cynthia Rothrock, Radames Pera, Michael Madsen), two documentaries on the series' development and production (From Grasshopper to Caine: the Making of Kung Fu, The Tao of Caine: Production and Beyond), and David Carradine's Shaolin Diary, a visit to China's Shaolin Monastery and the Great Wall.

DVD name	Ep #	Release date	Notes
The Complete First Season	16	March 16, 2004; November 14, 2017 (re-release)	Image cropped by 25% to 16:9 ratio Episodes presented edited-for-syndication
The Complete Second Season	23	January 18, 2005; November 14, 2017 (re-release)	Original fullscreen image
The Complete Third Season	24	August 23, 2005; November 14, 2017 (re-release)	Original fullscreen image
The Complete Series	63	November 6, 2007; November 14, 2017 (re-release)	No change (same as individual releases)

The series is also available online on Amazon Prime Video and iTunes (including pilot), and on Google TV.

== Revivals ==
=== Kung Fu: The Movie ===
In Kung Fu: The Movie (1986) Caine (again played by Carradine) is forced to fight his hitherto unknown son, Chung Wang (played by Brandon Lee). Herbie Pilato in The Kung Fu Book of Caine (page 157) also comments that Bruce Lee's son, Brandon Lee, was involved in sequels related to the series:

The late Brandon Lee, son of Bruce Lee, played Caine's son, Chung Wang. Toward the end of the film, Chung Wang asks Caine if he is his father. The question seems somewhat ironic since—in real life—Brandon's father was a contender for the role of Caine in the series. After Bruce Lee lost the part to Carradine, he went back to Hong Kong, where he made The Big Boss, the film that began his legendary career in martial arts movies.

=== Kung Fu: The Next Generation ===
In Kung Fu: The Next Generation (1987), the story moves to the present day and centers on the story of Kwai Chang "Johnny" Caine (Brandon Lee), who is the great-great-grandson of Kwai Chang Caine, and the difficult relationship he has with his father, also named Kwai Chang (David Darlow). In an attempt to connect with his son, Caine Sr. takes him to Silver Creek, a ghost town, the place where their ancestor spent his last years. They talk about how Caine arrived there, became the "wise man of the town", and how he died.

"So I guess he died here, right?"
"That's the strange thing. One evening in his garden his heart failed him. His wife went to fetch the doctor. When she returned, Kwai Chang was gone."
"Where did he go?"
"No one really knows."

As Johnny has involved himself with an operation of burglary and arms trafficking, the perfectionist father and the rebellious son need to put their differences aside to fight the criminals and save Johnny from prison.

=== Kung Fu: The Legend Continues ===
Two decades after the first series ended, a second, related series titled Kung Fu: The Legend Continues running in syndication followed the adventures of Kwai Chang Caine's grandson, also named Kwai Chang Caine. It again starred Carradine, this time as the grandson of the original Caine, and introduced Chris Potter as his son. Caine's mentor was played by Kim Chan as Lo Si (The Ancient) / Ping Hai. The second series ran for four years, from 1993 to 1997.

=== Feature film ===
In June 2006, Ed Spielman and Howard Friedlander announced that a feature film (which would serve as a prequel to the original Kung Fu series and take place in China) was in development. In 2007, Max Makowski planned to make the film edgier than the original television series. Actor-director Bill Paxton was in talks to direct the adaptation of the TV series. Baz Luhrmann was in talks to direct the film in 2014, and if the deal was made, Luhrmann was to rewrite the film's script. In 2020, 87North Productions announced development of a contemporary feature film version of the series with creator Spielman and Stephen L'Hereaux producing through his Solipsist Film company and David Leitch directing, and Donnie Yen was attached to star since January 31, 2024.

=== 2021 reboot ===
A re-imagining of the original series, simply titled Kung Fu, aired on The CW in April 2021. The show is produced by Greg Berlanti.

The series is written by Christina M. Kim and Martin Gero and sees a quarter-life crisis causing a young Chinese-American woman named Nicky, played by Olivia Liang, to drop out of college and take up residence in an isolated monastery in China. When she returns to find her hometown overrun with crime and corruption, she uses her martial arts skills and Shaolin values to protect her community and bring criminals to justice, all while searching for the assassin who killed her Shaolin mentor and now is targeting her.

The show stars Olivia Liang as Nicky; Tzi Ma and Kheng Hua Tan as Jin Chen and Mei-Li, her restaurateur parents whose secrets threaten to destroy their lives; Jon Prasida as Ryan Chen, a quick-witted medical student and Nicky's younger brother; Shannon Dang as Althea Chen, Nicky's larger-than-life older sister who is newly engaged and on her way to planning her dream Chinese wedding; and Eddie Liu as Henry Chu, a martial arts instructor and Chinese art history buff who has instant chemistry with Nicky. Gavin Stenhouse was cast as Evan Hartley, a highly successful assistant district attorney who still has a soft spot for his first love, Nicky; and Yvonne Chapman was cast as Zhilan, a cryptic woman with deep criminal ties and a mysterious connection to the Shaolin monastery where Nicky trained in kung fu.
