= Radames Pera =

American actor

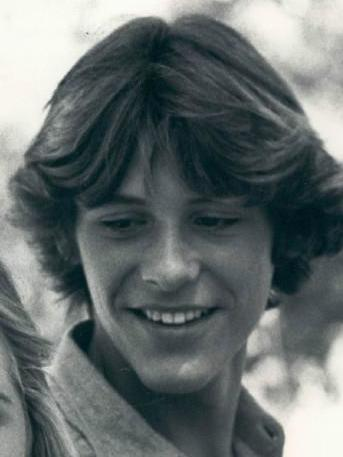
- Born: New York City, U.S.
- Occupation: Actor
- Years active: 1968–present
- Website: Radames Pera on YouTube

Radames Pera is an American actor best known for his role as "Grasshopper", the student Kwai Chang Caine in the 1972 to 1975 television series Kung Fu.

== Early life and acting career ==
Pera was born in New York City, the son of actress Lisa Pera and Spin Art's inventor, Eugene R. Pera. The couple split shortly after moving to Hollywood with their son in 1963. Over the next five years Lisa reached some notable success as an actor in film and network TV.

In 1968, at age eight, Radames was discovered by classic film Director Daniel Mann to play the role of Anthony Quinn and Irene Papas' dying son in the feature A Dream of Kings (1969). The two met at a dinner party Radames' mother held and he got cast in the role of Stavros.

After numerous young character roles, between 1972 until 1975 Radames appeared as Young Caine (better known as "Grasshopper") in the ABC television series Kung Fu. Caine was an orphan from Hunan Province in China who had an American father and a Chinese mother. He appeared throughout the original 4-year run of the hit Warner Bros./ABC series and for many more years in worldwide re-runs. For the role, Radames had to have his head shaved in the Pilot and Second Season, opting for bald-cap makeup during the 1st and 3rd seasons.

In Kung Fu Radames mainly worked with veteran Asian-American actors Philip Ahn (Master Kan), Keye Luke (blind Master Po, who named him "Grasshopper") and Richard Loo (Master Sun). His "flashback" scenes mostly took place in a Shaolin Monastery where he was taught by monks to be a Shaolin priest and kung-fu master. He is depicted as the first person to be welcomed into a Shaolin Monastery who was not of full Chinese birth. Kwai Chang Caine as an adult was played by David Carradine.

Radames also had a recurring role on Little House on the Prairie as John (Jr.), eldest adopted son of Mr. Edwards, and became Mary Ingalls' love interest during the show's second and third seasons.

Pera's other acting roles include a disturbed pre-teen in an episode of Night Gallery, "Silent Snow, Secret Snow", narrated by Orson Welles; guest appearances on The Six Million Dollar Man; and as Don Ameche's son in the telefilm Gidget Gets Married. Between 1969 and 1985 other guest-starring credits include Lassie, Marcus Welby, M.D., Family Affair, Hawaii Five-O and The Waltons among many others.

Radames withdrew from the acting business entirely after 1987. His final television appearances were on Mickey Spillane's The New Mike Hammer, and Starman. His last film role of the 20th century was as a Soviet soldier, Sgt. Stepan Gorsky in John Milius' Red Dawn (1984).

He has been living in France since 2017.

== Post-acting career ==
Pera developed other interests in video and electronics, forming his own company, All Systems Go! in L.A. in 1988, designing and installing home theaters and residential sound systems for clients like Johnny Depp, Nicolas Cage, Sharon Stone, Winona Ryder, Robert Downey Jr., Ben Stiller, Chuck Norris and others. Six years later he successfully relocated his life and business to Portland, Oregon for the next ten years, then to Austin, Texas, for another eight years. He continued to specialize in eliminating remote control clutter and other AV and WiFi solutions at his San Diego–based company, Remotalize (2012–2015). After retiring from the AV business Radames moved to France in 2017, where he wrote his memoirs and is currently seeking a literary agent and publisher.
