= Conrad Aiken =

American novelist and poet

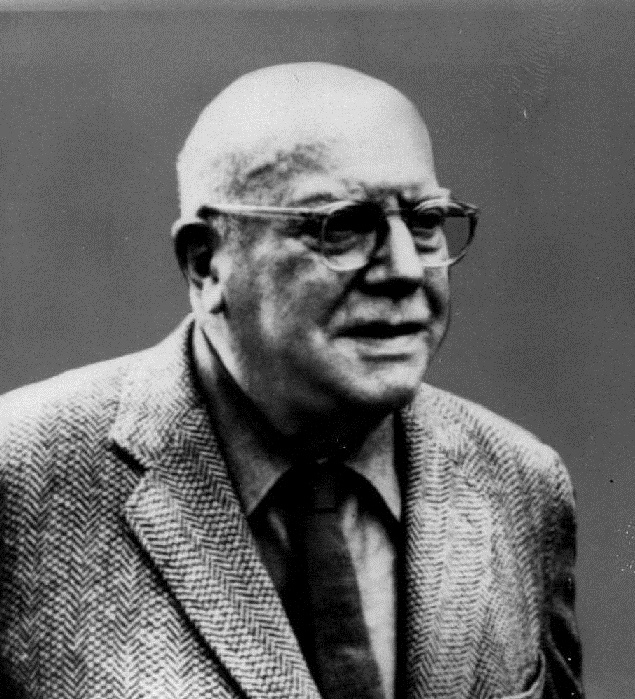
- Born: Conrad Potter Aiken; August 5, 1889; Savannah, Georgia, U.S.
- Died: August 17, 1973 (aged 84); Savannah, Georgia, U.S.
- Education: Harvard University (BA)
- Occupations: Poet; playwright; essayist; novelist; critic
- Spouse(s): Jessie McDonald (1912–1929); Clarissa Lorenz (1930); Mary Hoover (1937)
- Children: 3, including Jane and Joan

Conrad Potter Aiken (August 5, 1889 – August 17, 1973) was an American writer and poet, honored with a Pulitzer Prize and a National Book Award, and was United States Poet Laureate from 1950 to 1952. His published works include poetry, short stories, novels, literary criticism, a play, and an autobiography.

== Biography ==
=== Early years ===
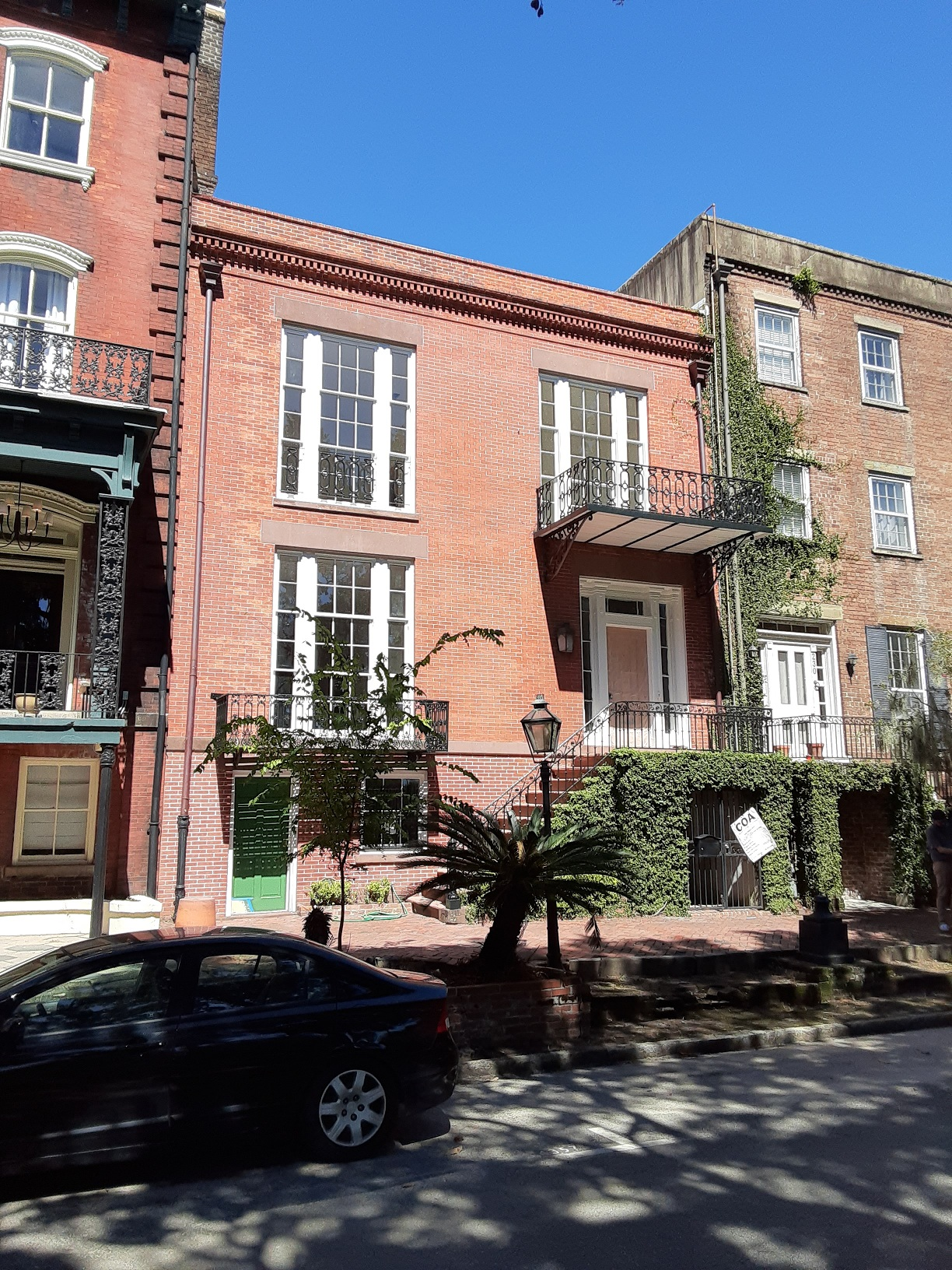
228 East Oglethorpe Avenue in Savannah, Georgia, his family's home

Aiken was the eldest son of William Ford and Anna (Potter) Aiken, daughter of noted Unitarian preacher William James Potter of New Bedford, Massachusetts. In Savannah, his father became a respected physician and eye surgeon. For the first eleven years of Aiken's life, his family lived at 228 East Oglethorpe Avenue in Savannah.

On February 27, 1901, Aiken's father murdered his mother, and then committed suicide. According to his 1952 autobiography, Ushant, Aiken, then 11 years old, heard the two gunshots and discovered the bodies immediately thereafter. After his parents' deaths, he was raised by his great-aunt and uncle in New Bedford between 1901 and 1902, then in Cambridge by his aunt, Grace Aiken Tillinghast and her husband, Will, a librarian at Harvard University. He attended Middlesex School, then Harvard.

At Harvard, Aiken edited the Advocate with T. S. Eliot, who became a lifelong friend, colleague, and influence. It was also at Harvard where Aiken studied under another significant influence in his writing, the philosopher George Santayana.

=== Adult years ===
Aiken was strongly influenced by symbolism, especially in his earlier works. In 1930 he received the Pulitzer Prize for Poetry for his Selected Poems. Many of his writings had strong psychological themes. He wrote the widely anthologized short story "Silent Snow, Secret Snow" (1934), partially based on his childhood tragedy.

Other influences were Aiken's maternal grandfather, William James Potter, who had been a church preacher, as well as Whitman's freestyle poetry. This helped Aiken shape his poetry more freely while his recognition of a God grounded his more visually rich explorations into the universe. Some of his best-known poetry, such as "Morning Song from Senlin", uses these influences to great effect.

His collections of verse include Earth Triumphant (1914), The Charnel Rose (1918) and And In the Hanging Gardens (1933). His poem "Music I Heard" has been set to music by a number of composers, including Leonard Bernstein, Henry Cowell, and Helen Searles Westbrook. Aiken wrote or edited more than 51 books, the first of which was published in 1914, two years after his graduation from Harvard. His work includes novels, short stories (The Collected Short Stories appeared in 1961), reviews, an autobiography, and poetry. He received numerous awards and honors for his writing, though for most of his lifetime, he received little public attention.

Though Aiken was reluctant to speak of his early trauma and ensuing psychological problems, he acknowledged that his writings were strongly influenced by his studies of Sigmund Freud, Carl G. Jung, Otto Rank, Ferenczi, Adler, and other depth psychologists. It was not until the publication of his autobiography, Ushant, that Aiken revealed the emotional challenges that he had battled for much of his adult life. During the 1920s Freud heard of him and offered to psychoanalyze him. While aboard a Europe-bound ship to meet with Freud, Aiken was discouraged by Erich Fromm from accepting the offer. Consequently, despite Freud's strong influence on Aiken, Aiken never met the noted psychoanalyst. As he later said, "Freud had read Great Circle, and I'm told kept a copy on his office table. But I didn't go, though I started to. Misgivings set in, and so did poverty."

=== Personal life ===
Aiken had three younger siblings, Kempton Potter (K. P. A. Taylor), Robert Potter (R. P. A. Taylor), and Elizabeth. After their parents' deaths, Aiken's siblings were adopted by Frederick Winslow Taylor and his wife Louise, a second cousin of their aunt. They took Taylor's last name. Kempton later helped establish the Aiken Taylor Award for Modern American Poetry.

He was married three times: firstly to Jessie McDonald (1912–1929); secondly to Clarissa Lorenz (1930–1937) (author of a biography, Lorelei Two); and thirdly to the painter Mary Hoover (1937–1973). He fathered three children by his first wife Jessie: John Aiken, Jane Aiken Hodge and Joan Aiken, all of whom became writers. Over the years, he served in loco parentis as well as mentor to the English author Malcolm Lowry.

Aiken married Jessie McDonald in 1912, and the couple moved to England in 1921 with their older two children, John (born 1913) and Jane (born 1917), settling in Rye, East Sussex (where the American novelist Henry James had once lived). The couple's youngest daughter, Joan, was born in Rye in 1924. Conrad Aiken returned to Cambridge, Massachusetts, as a tutor at Harvard from 1927 to 1928. For many years, he divided his time between Rye, New York, and Boston. In 1931 he was introduced by the artist Paul Nash to Edward Burra, a painter also living in Rye. That year Burra painted his gouache "John Deth", inspired by Aiken's poem of that name and originally intended to illustrate a projected edition that was never realized. Nevertheless, the two men maintained a lifelong friendship thereafter.

In 1936, Aiken met his third wife, Mary, in Boston. In the following year the couple visited Malcolm Lowry in Cuernavaca, Mexico, where Aiken divorced Clarissa and married Mary. The couple moved to Rye, where they remained until the outbreak of World War II in 1940. The Aikens settled in Brewster, Massachusetts, on Cape Cod, where he and his wife Mary later ran a summer program for writers and painters named after their antique farmhouse, "Forty-One Doors". Despite living for many years abroad and receiving recognition as a Southern writer, Aiken always considered himself an American, and, in particular, a New Englander.

In 1923, he acted as a witness at the marriage of his friend, poet W. H. Davies. From 1950 to 1952, he served as Poet Laureate Consultant in Poetry to the Library of Congress, more commonly known as Poet Laureate of the United States. In 1960, he visited Grasmere in the Lake District, England (once the home of William Wordsworth), with his friend Edward Burra.

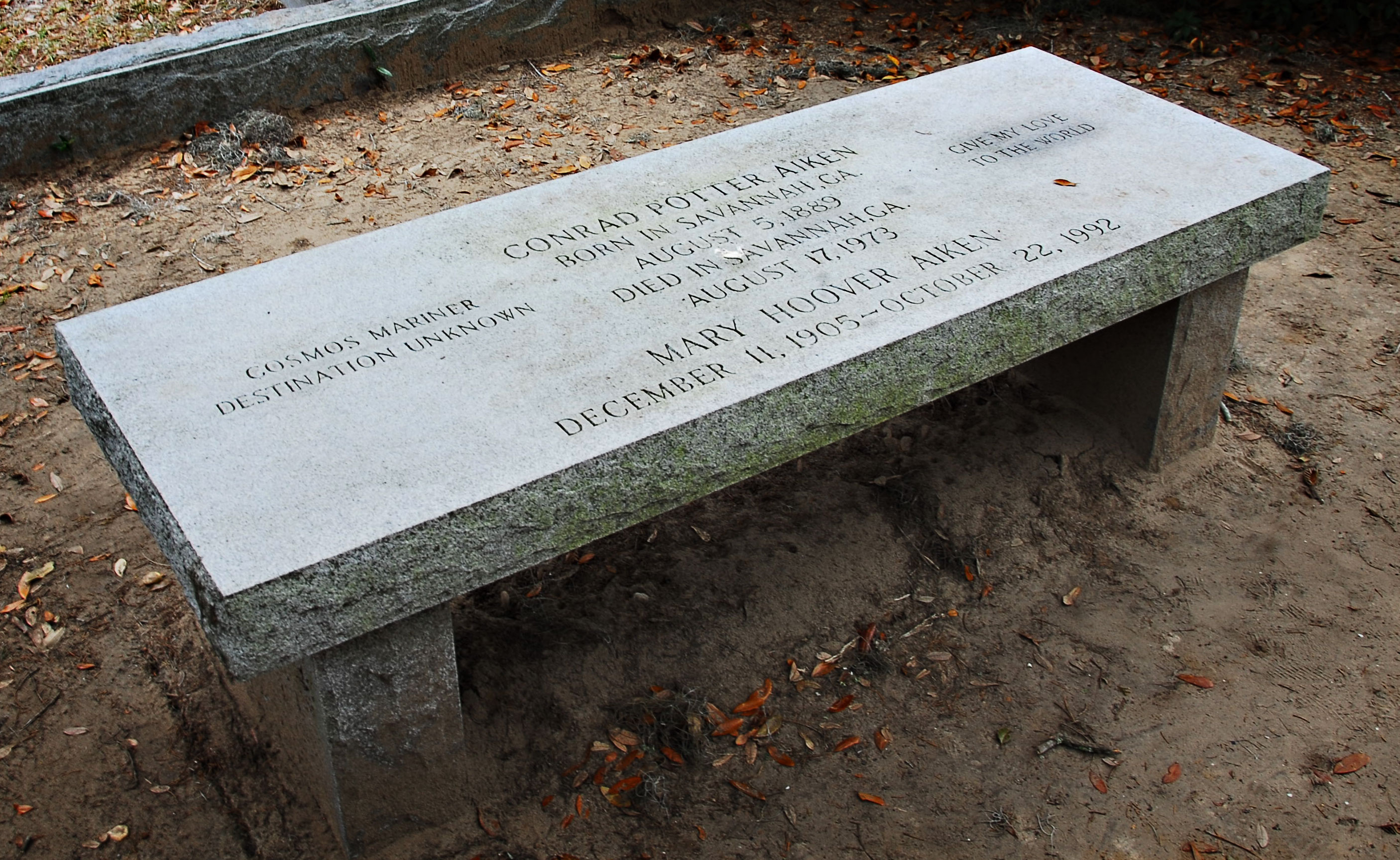
Bench at grave of Conrad Aiken in Bonaventure Cemetery in Savannah, Georgia

The Aikens lived primarily at their farmhouse in West Brewster and wintered in Savannah in a home adjacent to his early childhood house.

Aiken died on 17 August 1973, aged 84, and was buried in Bonaventure Cemetery in Savannah, Georgia, on the banks of the Wilmington River. His widow was buried beside him after her death in 1992. The burial site was featured in Midnight in the Garden of Good and Evil by John Berendt. According to local legend, Aiken wished to have his tombstone fashioned in the shape of a bench as an invitation to visitors to stop and enjoy a martini at his grave. The bench is inscribed with "Give my love to the world" and "Cosmos Mariner—Destination Unknown".

A primary source for information on Aiken's life is his autobiographical novel Ushant (1952), one of his major works. In it, he wrote candidly about his various affairs and marriages, his attempted suicide and fear of insanity, and his friendships with T. S. Eliot (who appears in the book as the Tsetse), Ezra Pound (Rabbi Ben Ezra), Malcolm Lowry (Hambo), and others.

== Awards and recognition ==
Named Poetry Consultant (now U.S. Poet Laureate) of the Library of Congress from 1950 to 1952, Aiken earned numerous prestigious writing honors, including a Pulitzer Prize in 1930 for Selected Poems, the 1954 National Book Award for Collected Poems, the Bollingen Prize in Poetry, the National Institute of Arts and Letters Gold Medal in Poetry, and a National Medal for Literature. He was awarded a Guggenheim fellowship in 1934, Academy of American Poets fellowship in 1957, Huntington Hartford Foundation Award in 1960, and Brandeis University Creative Arts Award in 1967. Aiken was the first Georgia-born author to win a Pulitzer Prize, and was named Georgia's Poet Laureate in 1973. He was the first winner of the Poetry Society of America's Shelley Memorial Award, in 1929. In 1973, he was nominated for the Nobel Prize in Literature but died months earlier before his only chance to be awarded.

In 2009, the Library of America selected Aiken's 1931 story "Mr. Arcularis" for inclusion in its two-century retrospective of American Fantastic Tales.

== Selected works ==
=== Poetry collections ===
- Earth Triumphant (Aiken, 1914)
- Turns and Movies and Other Tales in Verse (Aiken, 1916, Houghton Mifflin)
- The Jig of Forslin: A Symphony, 1916
- Nocturne of Remembered Spring: And Other Poems (Aiken, 1917)
- Charnel Rose (Aiken, 1918)
- The House of Dust: A Symphony, 1920
- Punch: The Immortal Liar, Documents in His History, 1921
- Priapus and the Pool, 1922
- The Pilgrimage of Festus, 1923
- Priapus and the Pool, and Other Poems, 1925
- Selected Poems, 1929
- John Deth, A Metaphysical Legacy, and Other Poems, 1930
- The Coming Forth by Day of Osiris Jones, 1931
- Preludes for Memnon, 1931
- Landscape West of Eden, 1934
- Time in the Rock; Preludes to Definition, 1936
- And in the Human Heart, 1940
- Brownstone Eclogues, and Other Poems, 1942
- The Soldier: A Poem, 1944
- The Kid, 1947
- The Divine Pilgrim, 1949
- Skylight One: Fifteen Poems, 1949
- Collected Poems, 1953
- A Letter from Li Po and Other Poems, 1955
- Sheepfold Hill: Fifteen Poems, 1958
- The Morning Song of Lord Zero, Poems Old and New, 1963
- Thee: A Poem, 1967
- Collected Poems, 2nd ed., 1970

=== Short story collections ===
- Bring! Bring! and Other Stories (1925)
- Costumes by Eros (1928)
- Among the Lost People (1934)
- The Short Stories of Conrad Aiken (1950)
- The Collected Short Stories of Conrad Aiken (1960)

=== Novels ===
- Blue Voyage (1927)
- Great Circle (1933)
- King Coffin (1935)
- A Heart for the Gods of Mexico (1939)
- The Conversation (1940)

=== Other books ===
- Scepticisms: Notes on Contemporary Poetry (1919)
- Ushant (1952)
- A Reviewer's ABC: Collected Criticism of Conrad Aiken from 1916 to the Present (1958)

=== Short stories ===
Title	Publication	Collected in
"The Timid Burglar"	The Story Teller 14 (January 1903)	-
"The Making of the Trail"	The Anvil (January 1904)	-
"My Lord's Pirate"	The Anvil (June 1904)	-
"The Dreamer"	The Anvil (November 1904)	-
"Number 58"	The Anvil (January 1905)	-
"How the Partnership Was Dissolved"	The Anvil (March 1905)	-
"The Fiddlers Three"	The Anvil (November 1905)	-
"Rabbit"	The Harvard Advocate (November 25, 1908)	-
"The Wallet"	The Harvard Advocate (December 18, 1908)	-
"The Cat and the Mouse"	The Harvard Advocate (January 26, 1909)	-
"The Murderer"	The Harvard Advocate (April 28, 1909)	-
"By the Hermitage Walls"	The Harvard Advocate (October 26, 1909)	-
"Me and Her" (with W.C. Greene)	The Harvard Advocate (November 20, 1909)	-
"Corpus Vile"	The Harvard Advocate (December 20, 1909)	-
"The Huntsman"	The Harvard Advocate (February 11, 1910)	-
"College Kodaks"	The Harvard Advocate (March 4, 1910)	-
"The Dark City"	The Dial (April 1922)	Bring! Bring! and Other Stories
"Soliloquy on a Park Bench"	The Dial (June 1922)	Bring! Bring! and Other Stories
"The Escape from Fatuity"	The Milwaukee Arts Monthly (November–December 1922)	Bring! Bring! and Other Stories
"Smith and Jones"	The Dial (April 1923)	Bring! Bring! and Other Stories
"White Crinolines"	Munsey's Magazine (June 1923)	-
"The Disciple"	Harper's Magazine (December 1924)	Bring! Bring! and Other Stories
"Strange Moonlight"	The Dial (March 1925)	Bring! Bring! and Other Stories
"The Last Visit"	The Dial (April 1925)	Bring! Bring! and Other Stories
"The Letter"	Bring! Bring! and Other Stories (March 1925)	Bring! Bring! and Other Stories
"Bring! Bring!"	Bring! Bring! and Other Stories (March 1925)	Bring! Bring! and Other Stories
"Hey, Taxi!"	Bring! Bring! and Other Stories (March 1925)	Bring! Bring! and Other Stories
"The Anniversary"	Bring! Bring! and Other Stories (March 1925)	Bring! Bring! and Other Stories
"By My Troth, Nerisa!"	Bring! Bring! and Other Stories (March 1925)	Bring! Bring! and Other Stories
"The Orange Moth"	Bring! Bring! and Other Stories (March 1925)	Bring! Bring! and Other Stories
"State of Mind"	The New Republic (July 6, 1927)	Costumes by Eros
"The Necktie"	Bermondsey Book (September–November 1927)	Costumes by Eros
"Your Obituary, Well Written"	Scribner's Magazine (November 1927)	Costumes by Eros
"Spider, Spider"	Scribner's Magazine (February 1928)	Costumes by Eros
"The Woman-Hater"	Scribner's Magazine (April 1928)	Costumes by Eros
"The Moment"	Harper's Magazine (May 1928)	Costumes by Eros
"All, All Wasted"	The Harvard Advocate (May 1928)	Costumes by Eros
"Farewell! Farewell! Farewell!"	Scribner's Magazine (August 1928)	Costumes by Eros
"Field of Flowers"	Costumes by Eros (September 1928)	Costumes by Eros
"I Love You Very Dearly"	Costumes by Eros (September 1928)	Costumes by Eros
"A Man Alone at Lunch"	Costumes by Eros (September 1928)	Costumes by Eros
"A Conversation"	Costumes by Eros (September 1928)	Costumes by Eros
"The Professor's Escape"	Costumes by Eros (September 1928)	Costumes by Eros
"West End"	Costumes by Eros (September 1928)	Costumes by Eros
"The Fish Supper"	Scribner's Magazine (December 1928)	Among the Lost People
"No, No, Go Not to Lethe"	Scribner's Magazine (August 1929)	Among the Lost People
"Gehenna"	Gehenna (1930)	Among the Lost People
"Mr. Arcularis"	Harper's Magazine (March 1931)	Among the Lost People
"Bow Down, Isaac!"	Harper's Magazine (July 1931)	Among the Lost People
"Silent Snow, Secret Snow"	Virginia Quarterly Review (October 1932)	Among the Lost People
"Impulse"	Story (April 1933)	Among the Lost People
"O How She Laughed!"	Among the Lost People (March 1934)	Among the Lost People
"The Night Before Prohibition"	Among the Lost People (March 1934)	Among the Lost People
"Pure as the Driven Snow"	Among the Lost People (March 1934)	Among the Lost People
"The Bachelor Supper"	Among the Lost People (March 1934)	Among the Lost People
"Thistledown"	Among the Lost People (March 1934)	Among the Lost People
"Life Isn't a Short Story"	North American Review (June 1934)	The Short Stories of Conrad Aiken
"Fly Away Ladybird"	Esquire (November 1934)	The Collected Short Stories of Conrad Aiken
"Round By Round"	The American Mercury (April 1935)	The Short Stories of Conrad Aiken
"A Pair of Vikings"	Esquire (March 1941)	The Short Stories of Conrad Aiken
"Hello, Tib"	Mademoiselle (May 1941)	The Short Stories of Conrad Aiken
