= Mary Hoover Aiken =

American painter (1905–1992)

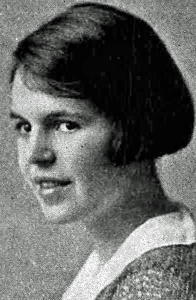
- Born: December 11, 1905; Cuba
- Died: October 22, 1992 (aged 86); Tybee Island
- Occupation: Artist
- Spouse(s): Conrad Aiken

Mary Augusta Hoover Aiken (11 December 1905 – 22 October 1992) was an American painter. She was the third wife and widow of Pulitzer-Prize winning poet Conrad Aiken.

== Biography ==
Mary Augusta Hoover was born on 11 December 1905 in Cuba, New York, the daughter of a civil engineer. She grew up in Washington, DC, where she attended Central High School and studied painting at the Corcoran School of Art. She later studied with Charles Hawthorne, Edwin Dickinson, and George Luks and earned scholarships to study in Fontainebleau and in Munich at the Königliche Kunstgewerbeschule München.

Spanish painter Luis Quintinilla selected Hoover to assist him in painting two large frescos called Ignorancia and Conciencia at the Ciudad Universitaria de Madrid. Due to growing violence in the years before the Spanish Civil War, she left the Spanish mainland for Santa Eulalia on the island of Ibiza in 1933. There she spent almost two years painting. One of the paintings she completed on Ibiza was Café Fortune Teller (1933), now in the collection of the Telfair Museum. Hoover depicts herself telling her fortune with a deck of cards in the café below her Ibiza hotel. Of her time in Spain, she said "An American girl may be escorted to a night club by a Spaniard who in no circumstances would take his wife there."

When she returned to the United States, her art career blossomed. She was featured in over a dozen art shows in two years and the Metropolitan Museum of Art would later purchase two of her paintings.

In Boston in 1936, she met Conrad Aiken, who was still married and 47. They quickly settled in a rented house in Charlestown with the painter Edward Burra, the two painters each working on an upper floor and Aiken writing in the cellar. Aiken was unable to secure a divorce from his second wife in the United States, so the trio travelled by train to Mexico to visit Aiken's former student, the novelist Malcolm Lowry, who was living in Cuernavaca. After some time in Mexico, he was able to get a divorce in nearby Jojutla and the Aikens were married on July 7, 1937.

Initially the couple settled in Conrad Aiken's home Jeake's House in Rye, Sussex, but World War II forced them to return to the United States in 1940. In the US they largely divided their time between a Cape Cod cottage they called Forty-One Doors in Brewster, Massachusetts and a house in Conrad Aiken's native Savannah, Georgia. She taught drawing and painting, had solo exhibitions of her work, and painted portraits, one of her husband, her husband's friend the poet T. S. Eliot, and others.

Many of the poems in Conrad Aiken's collection of sonnets, And In The Human Heart, were originally included in letters he wrote to Mary. Mary Aiken contributed illustrations to Conrad Aiken's book of children's verse, A Little Who's Zoo of Mild Animals.

Mary Hoover Aiken died on 22 October 1992 in Tybee Island, Georgia. She is buried in Bonaventure Cemetery in Savannah next to her husband, who died in 1973.
