= Scott Appel =

American musician and musicologist

Scott T. Appel (August 3, 1954 – March 11, 2003) was a musician and a musicologist.

Appel began playing the guitar at the age of eight. His early influences were the English "folkies" Davy Graham and Bert Jansch.

In 1972 Appel gained admittance to Boston's Berklee School of Music.

In 1989 Appel released the album Nine of Swords on the Kicking Mule label as KM-343, which included six Nick Drake covers and also some Drake-influenced pieces. It was reissued in 1995 by Schoolkids Records The album was warmly received and received four stars from Rolling Stone.

Appel died in New Jersey at the age of 48 after a long battle with heart disease.

Appel was a primary contributor to the Nick Drake tribute album Brittle Days – A Tribute to Nick Drake (1992) released by Manchester England's Imaginary Records. Appel contributed "From the Morning" and "Hazy Jane".

== Discography ==
- Glassfinger (1985)
- Nine of Swords (1989)
- Parhelion (1998)
