= Nine of Swords (album) =

Studio album by Scott Appel
- Released: 1989
- Recorded: February 1987 – January 1988
- Genre: Folk
- Length: 68:29
- Label: Schoolkids Records

Scott Appel chronology
Nine of Swords (1989)	Brittle Days – A Tribute to Nick Drake (1992)

Professional ratings
Review scores
Source	Rating
Rolling Stone	4/5 stars

Nine of Swords is a tribute album by Scott Appel that contains compositions by and about Nick Drake.

== Track listing ==
1. "Bird Flew By" – (Nick Drake)
2. "Somnus" – (Scott Appel)
3. "Blur" – (Scott Appel)
4. "Nearly" – (Scott Appel/Nick Drake)
5. "Far Leys"
6. "Blossom" – (Nick Drake)
7. "Our Season" – (Nick Drake)
8. "Nine of Swords" – (Scott Appel)
9. "Place to Be" – (Nick Drake)
10. "Thanatopsis" – (Scott Appel)
11. "Parasite" – (Nick Drake)
12. "Spencer the Rover" – (Traditional)
13. "Silent Snow" – (Scott Appel)
14. "Song for Ireland" – (June Colclough/Phil Colclough/Dick Colclough)
