= Single-edged sword =

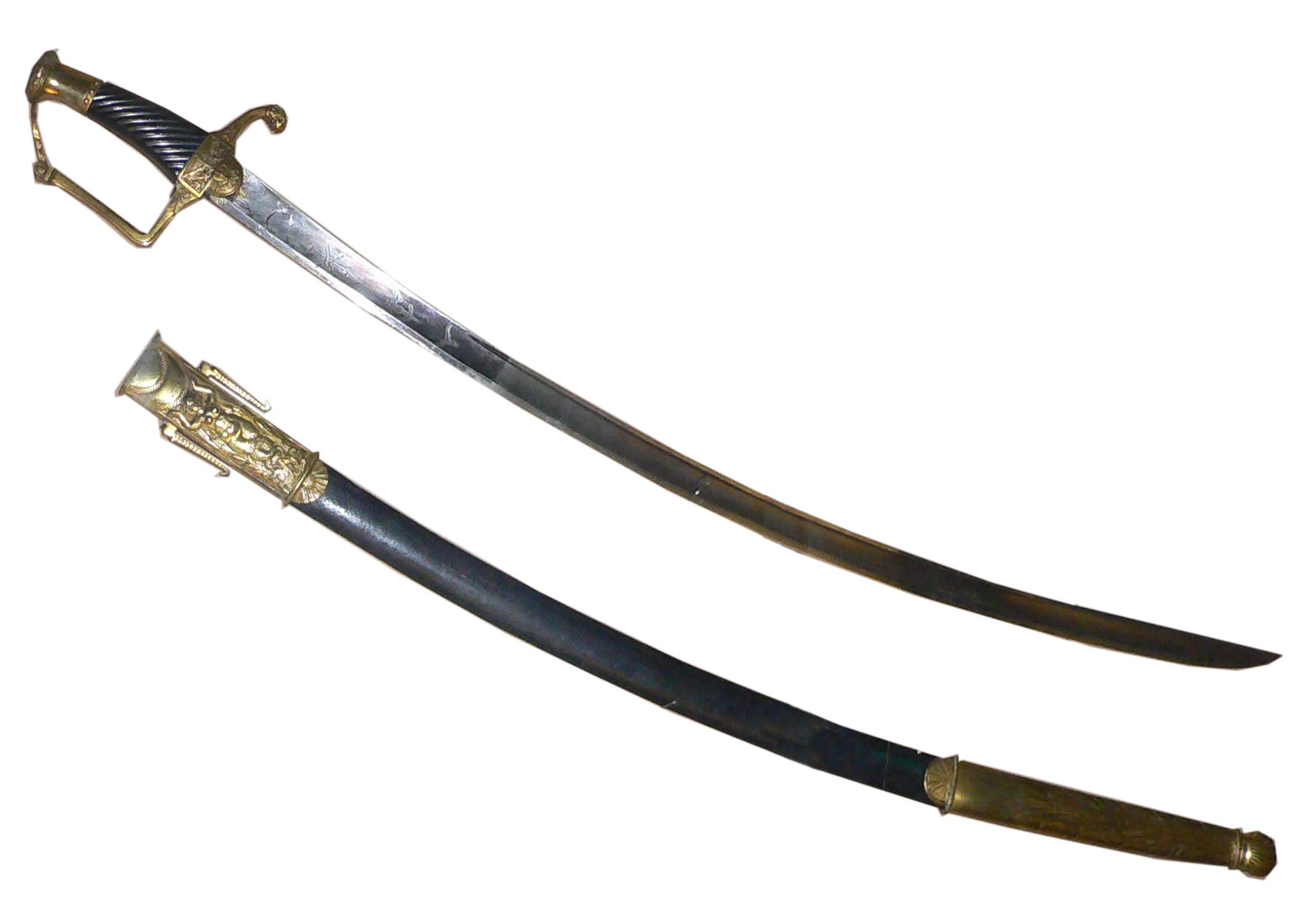
French Navy officer sabre

Single-edged swords are a class of swords with one cutting edge, such as:

- Ada
- Akrafena
- Alamang
- Amanremu
- Aruval
- Ayudha katti
- Backsword
- Balato
- Bangkung
- Banyal
- Barog
- Batangas
- Bicuco
- Bolo knife
- Cimpaba
- Cutlass
- Dahong palay
- Dao (Chinese sword)
  - Butterfly sword
  - Changdao
  - Liuyedao
  - Miaodao
  - Nandao
  - Niuweidao
  - Piandao
  - Wodao
  - Yanmaodao
  - Zhanmadao
- Dao (Naga sword)
- Dha
- Falcata
- Falchion
- Falx
- Flyssa
- Gari
- Gayang
- Golok
- Hengdang
- Hook sword
- Hunting sword
- Hwandudaedo
- Katana
- Kabeala
- Kampilan
- Kastane
- Khopesh
- Kirpan
- Klewang
- Kopis
- Kukri
- Lahot
- Langgai Tinggang
- Laring
- Luwuk
- Makhaira
- Mandau
- Messer
- Moplah sword
- Ninjatō
- Ngulu
- Niabor
- Panabas
- Pandat
- Paramerion
- Parang
- Parang Nabur
- Patag
- Pichangatti
- Pinutí
- Pirah
- Ram-dao
- Rhomphaia
- Sabre
  - Dusack
  - Karabela
  - Shashka
  - Swiss sabre
  - Szabla
  - Turko-Mongol sabre
- Scimitar
  - Arab sword
  - Kilij
  - Mameluke sword
  - Nimcha
  - Pulwar
  - Shamshir
  - Talwar
- Scythe sword
- Seax
- Sikin Panjang
- Sorocaban knife
- Surik
- Susuwat
- Tō (Japanese sword)
  - Chokutō
  - Guntō
  - Kaiken
  - Katana
  - Kodachi
  - Nagamaki
  - Ninjatō
  - Ōdachi
  - Shikomizue
  - Tachi
  - Tantō
  - Wakizashi
  - Yoroi-dōshi
- Utak
- Yatagan

== See also ==
- Double-edged sword, a class of swords with two cutting edges
