= Types of swords =

Bladed weapon

This is a list of types of swords. The term sword used here is a narrow definition. This is not a general List of premodern combat weapons and does not include the machete, macuahuitl or similar "sword-like" weapons.

== African swords ==
=== Northern African swords ===
- Flyssa (19th century Algeria)
- Kaskara (19th century Sudan)
- Khopesh (Egyptian)
- Mameluke sword (18th to 19th century Egyptian)
- Nimcha (15th to 19th century Morocco, Algeria and Tunisia)

=== Eastern African swords ===
- Billao (Somali)
- Shotel (Eritrea and Ethiopian)
- Seme (dagger) (Kenya)

=== Western African swords ===
- Akrafena (Ghana and Togo)
- Ida (Nigeria and Benin)
- Takoba (Mali and Niger)

=== Central African swords ===
- Ikakalaka
- Ikul
- Mambele
- Ngulu

== Asian swords ==
=== Eastern Asian swords ===
==== China ====
- Dao (刀 pinyin dāo) "sabre"
  - Baguadao (八卦刀)
  - Butterfly sword (蝴蝶雙刀)
  - Changdao (長刀)
  - Dadao (大刀)
  - Liuyedao (柳葉刀)
  - Miao dao (苗刀)
  - Nandao (南刀)
  - Piandao (片刀)
  - Wodao (倭刀)
  - Yanmaodao (雁翎刀)
  - Zhanmadao (斬馬刀)
- Jian (劍 pinyin jiàn)
  - Shuangshou jian (雙手劍)
- Hook sword (鉤)

==== Japan ====
- Nihonto (日本刀; にほんとう)
  - Bokken (木剣)
  - Chokutō (直刀)
  - Guntō (軍刀)
    - Kyū guntō (旧軍刀)
    - Shin guntō (新軍刀)
  - Hachiwara (鉢割)
  - Iaitō (居合刀)
  - Jintachi (陣太刀)
  - Katana (刀; かたな)
  - Kenukigata tachi (毛抜型太刀)
  - Kodachi (小太刀)
  - Nagamaki (長巻)
  - Ninjato (忍者刀)
  - Ōdachi/Nodachi (大太刀/野太刀)
  - Sasuga (刺刀)
  - Shinai (竹刀)
  - Shinken (真剣)
  - Shikomizue (仕込み杖)
  - Tachi (太刀; たち)
  - Tantō (短刀; たんとう)
  - Tsurugi (剣)
  - Wakizashi (脇差; わきざし)
  - Naginata (なぎなた)
  - Sai (weapon) (サイ)

==== Korea ====
- Hwandudaedo (환두대도; 环首大刀)
- Saingeom (사인검)

=== Southeastern Asian swords ===
Swords and knives found in Southeast Asia are influenced by Indian, Chinese, Middle Eastern, and European forms.

==== Indonesia/Malaysia ====
- Alamang
- Amanremu
- Badik
- Balato (sword)
- Blakas
- Gari (sword)
- Golok
- Kabeala
- Karambit
- Keris
- Klewang
- Kujang
- Langgai Tinggang
- Luwuk
- Mandau
- Niabor
- Palitai
- Pandat
- Parang
- Rencong
- Sewar
- Si Euli
- Sikin Panjang

==== Myanmar ====
- Dha

==== Philippines ====
- Balasiong
- Balisword
- Balisong
- Bangkung
- Banyal
- Barong
- Batangas
- Bolo
- Dahong Palay
- Gayang
- Gulok
- Kalis
- Kampilan
- Panabas
- Pinuti
- Pirah
- Sundang
- Susuwat
- Utak

==== Thailand ====
- Daab
- Krabi

=== Southern Asian swords ===
==== Bhutan ====
- Patag

==== Bladed weapons of the Indian subcontinent ====
- Kirpan
- Tegha
- Sirohi sword
- Asi
- Firangi
- Hengdang
- Talwar
- Kayamkulam vaal
- Khanda
- Koftgiri
- Malappuram Kathi
- Moplah
- Pata
- Ram-dao
- Urumi

==== Sri Lanka ====
- Kastane

=== Western and Central Asian swords ===
- Acinaces (Scythian short sword)
- Chereb (חֶרֶב, modern Hebrew khérev): ancient Israelite sword mentioned 413 times in the Hebrew Bible.

The Ancient Greeks and Romans also introduced various types of swords, see #Ancient Europe.

==== Post-classical period ====
All of the Islamic world during the 16th to 18th century, including the Ottoman Empire and Persia were influenced by the "scimitar" type of single-edged curved sword. Via the Mameluke sword this also gave rise to the European cavalry sabre.

Terms for the "scimitar" curved sword:

- Kilij (Turkish)
- Pulwar (Afghanistan)
- Shamshir (Persia)
- Yataghan (Turkish)
- Khanjar (Arabian)
- Saif (Arabian)
- Scimitar (Arabian)
- Zulfiqar (Arabian)

== European swords ==
=== Ancient European swords ===
- Bronze Age European swords
  - Harpe: mentioned almost exclusively in Greek mythology
- Iron Age European swords
  - Falcata: one-handed single-edged sword – blade 48–60 cm (19–24 in) – with forward-curving blade for slashing
  - Falx: Dacian and Thracian one-handed or two-handed single-edged curved shortsword for slashing
  - Gladius: Roman one-handed double-edged shortsword for thrusting (primary) and slashing, used by legionaries (heavy infantry) and gladiators, and late Roman light infantry. 3rd century BCE Roman Republic – late Roman Empire.
  - Kopis: one-handed single-edged sword – blade 48–60 cm (19–24 in) – with forward-curving blade for slashing
  - Makhaira: Greek one-handed, single-edged shortsword or knife for cutting (primary) and thrusting
  - Pugio: Roman dagger
  - Rhomphaia: Greek single-edged straight or slightly curved broadsword – blade 60–80 cm (24–31 in) – for slashing (primary) and thrusting
  - Spatha: Celtic/Germanic/Roman one-handed double-edged longsword – blade 50–100 cm (20–39 in) – for thrusting and slashing, used by gladiators, cavalry and heavy infantry. 3rd century BCE Gaul/Germania – Migration Period.
  - Xiphos: Greek one-handed, double-edged Iron Age straight shortsword
  - Xyele: The short, slightly curved, one-edged sword of the Spartans.
- Migration Period swords
  - Spatha: continuation, evolved into
    - Ring-sword (ring-spatha, ring-hilt spatha), Merovingian period
    - Viking sword or Carolingian sword
  - Krefeld type

=== Post-classical European swords ===
- Arming sword: high medieval knightly sword
- Backsword
- Baselard
- Carracks black sword
- Cinquedea
- Claymore: late medieval Scottish sword
- Curtana: a medieval term for a ceremonial sword
- Estoc: thrust-oriented sword
- Falchion
- Flamberge
- Hunting sword
- Knightly sword
- Longsword: late medieval
- Messer
- Misericorde
- Paramerion: Eastern Roman Byzantine sword
- Parrying dagger
- Poignard
- Rondel dagger
- Schiavonesca
- Seax: shortsword, knife or dagger of varying sizes typical of the Germanic peoples of the Migration Period and the Early Middle Ages, especially the Saxons, whose name derives from the weapon.
- Small sword
- Spadroon
- Stiletto
- Viking sword or Carolingian sword: early medieval spatha
- Zweihänder: 1500–1600 Germany

=== Modern European swords ===
- Basket-hilted sword
- Colichemarde
- Cutlass
- Dirk
- Dusack
- Executioner's sword
- Karabela
- Katzbalger
- Sgian-dubh
- Swiss degen
- Szabla
- Early modern fencing
  - Feder
  - Rapier
  - Sabre
  - Spada da lato
- Modern fencing (sport equipment)
  - Épée
  - Foil (fencing)
  - Sabre (fencing)

== North American swords ==
- U.S. regulation swords (sabres, and in some instances fascine knives shaped like short swords)

== See also ==
- Classification of swords
- List of daggers
- Lists of swords
