= List of Filipino weaponry =

The following is a list of Filipino swords and other Filipino weaponry in alphabetical order.

== B ==
- Balarao (Also spelled as balaraw, bararao or bararaw) Used throughout pre-colonial Philippines; Commonly used by Visayans and the Mandaya people, where it is known as bayadau or badao.
- Balasiong (Also spelled as balacion, baliciong or balisiong) Used by Muslim Filipino ethnolinguistic groups (especially the Moro people) in Southern Philippines.
- Balisong
  - Balisword
- Bangkung
- Banyal (Also known as banjal) Similar to the Bangkung.
- Barong - Used by the Tausug, Sama-Bajau and Yakan.
- Batangas (Note: Not to be confused with Batangas province.)
- Bolo - Also known as iták in Tagalog and binangon in Hiligaynon.
- Bolo-guna - Also known as guna.
- Bagobo - The Bagobo sword comes from The Bagobo people, a tribe that traces its origin from the people who brought Hinduism to Mindanao during the Sri Vijayan and Majapahit invasion. When the people inter-married with the locals, they formed a new society and came up with the name Bagobo.
- Bagakay - Bagakays can be either made of wood or steel depending on choice, wooden ones are more traditional, steel ones more modern. They have a point on both ends and are thrown similar to a knife but usually five at a time.
- Budjak (Also known as bangkaw, budjak, bodjak, budiak, sibat)
  - Fan'-kao - Igorot version of the Budjak
  - Kay-yan' - Igorot version of the Budjak
  - Fal-fĕg' - War spear of the Bontoc people
- Bangkon
- Bicuco
- Bunal - A club made from Rattan, Kamagong or Bahi. Usually a heavy stick with a wrapping for the grip area made out of goat skin
- Baston
- Bugsay oar (Karay-a)
- Buntot pagi
- Binacuco

== D ==
- Daga
- Dahong palay
- Dulo-dulo

== E ==
- Espada (Espada means sword in Cebuano and Hiligaynon)
- Espada Y Daga

== G ==
- Garab knife
- Garab sword
- Garab sickle
- Gayang
- Ginunting - Commonly used in the Philippine jungles, Ginunting was the official sword of the Philippine Marines, commonly seen together with their M16 rifles and other military weapons
- Gunong (Also known as puñal or puñal de kris)

== H ==
- Hagibis
- Haras

== I ==
- Itak
- Immigat

== K ==
- Kalis
- Kalasag
- Kampilan
- Kampilan bolo
- Katipunan bolo
- Kinabasi

== L ==
- Lahot (Also known as a gayong)
- Lantaka
- Laring

== M ==
- Maguindanao Kris Sword

== O ==
- Olis

== P ==
- Pakal
- Palm stick
- Paltik
- Paltik shotgun
- Pana
  - Injun Pana
- Panabas Axe
- Pinutí (Also known as pinute)
- Pira cotabato

== S ==
- Sanduko bolo
- Sanduko Y Daga
- Sansibar (Note: Not to be confused with Zanzibar.)
- Sugob
- Sundang bolo
- Susuwat
- Sumpit
- Sinanbartolome
- Sinanduke
- Sinungot ulang

== T ==
- Tabak
- Talibon - The Talibong or Talibon is a sword that has an overstated belly and was commonly used by the ladies in the northern Philippines during the later part of the Spanish era and the early American regime. The Talibong was used as a hunting tool but during the Spanish era, it was carried by warriors to defend themselves
- Tenegre
- Tirador - A filipino Slingshot
- Tukon-Staff
- Tagan
- Tabak-Toyok
- Taming

== U ==
- Utak
- Uhas tari

== V ==
- Visayan Barong

== W ==
- War Golok - The Golok is the only sword in the Philippines that does not have a pointy tip; It inspired others such as the British Army Golok.
- Wasay Axe

== Y ==
- Yo-Yo (Note: Not to be confused with Yo-yo) - In the Philippines around 1500, the Yo-Yo was a weapon. It consisted of a four pound stone attached to a rope about 20 feet long. Tribesmen used it in two ways. When hunting, they stood off to one side, held one end of the rope and threw the rock towards the legs of an animal. The rope became tangled around the animals legs, and with a tug, the hunter brought the animal down. Against enemies, the stones would be dropped on their heads. The tribesmen would quickly recover the stones, ready for a second blow if necessary
