= Weapons of Moroland =

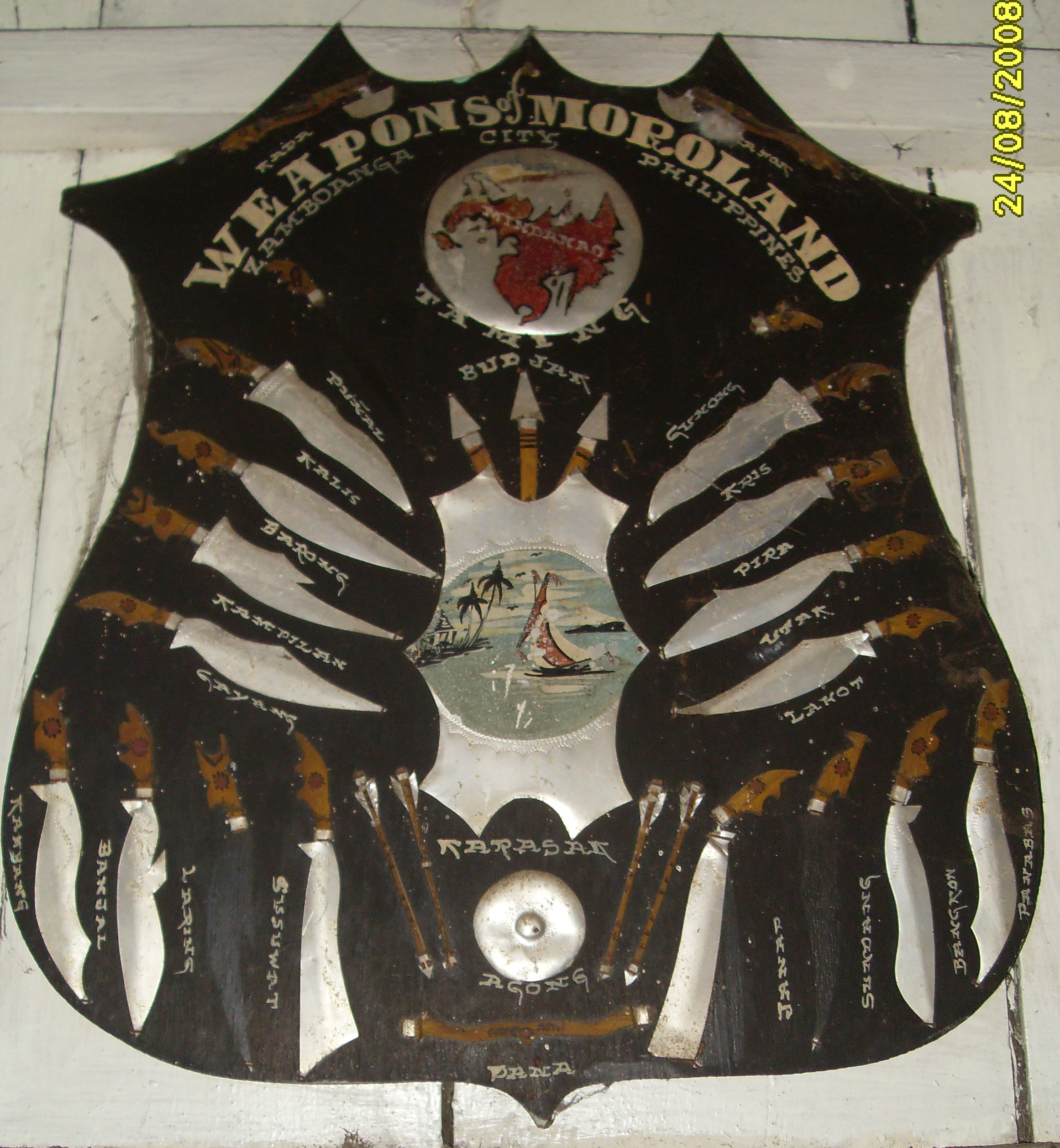
A vintage Weapons of Moroland plaque, on display at the Quirino-Syquia Museum in Vigan, Ilocos Sur, Philippines

"Weapons of Moroland" is a plaque or crest containing miniature models of weapons used by warriors from the indigenous peoples of Mindanao in the Philippines. As a souvenir, it is fairly common in gift shops, and is considered a pop culture icon. Displaying the plaque in one's home is one of several indications of "how Filipino" one is. It is jokingly used as a description of resistance to colonialism.

The weapons on the wooden plaque include spears, shields, and a wide range of swords or knives such as the kris, barong and the kampilan, while the plaque itself is usually shaped like the Coat of arms of the Philippines, and is often though not always painted in the colors of that seal.

The quality of the models varies from case to case, usually reflecting the general shape of each weapon but not usually accurately showing the scale of blades with their hilts, nor the scale of weapons relative to each other.

== Typically featured weapons ==
=== Blade weapons ===
- Balasiong
- Bangkung (Bangkon)
- Banjal
- Barong
- Budjak
- Gunong (Punyal)
- Janap
- Kalis
- Kambantuli
- Kampilan
- Kapa
- Kris
- Lahot
- Laring
- Gayang
- Panabas
- Pirah
- Punyal
- Susuwat
- Utak

=== Shields ===
- Kalasak
- Sangkil
- Taming

=== Spears ===
- Budjak

=== Others ===
- Agung - A musical instrument of the Kulintang ensemble, used as a signal to relay commands in battle.
