= Patag =

Patag may refer to:

- Patag (sword), a traditional Bhutanese sword
- Patag, a barangay of Cagayan de Oro, Philippines
- Patag, a barangay of Malapatan, Sarangani, Philippines
- Patag, a barangay of Silay City, Philippines
- Patag Shoal, a shoal part of Spratly Island
- Patag island in the South China Sea
