= Ngulu =

Ngulu may refer to:

- Ngulu language, a language of Tanzania
- Ngulu people
- Ngulu Atoll, an island in the Federated States of Micronesia
- Ngulu (weapon), an execution sword of the Ngombe people
- Termitomyces titanicus (chi-ngulu-ngulu), a large West African mushroom
