= Backsword =

Type of European sword

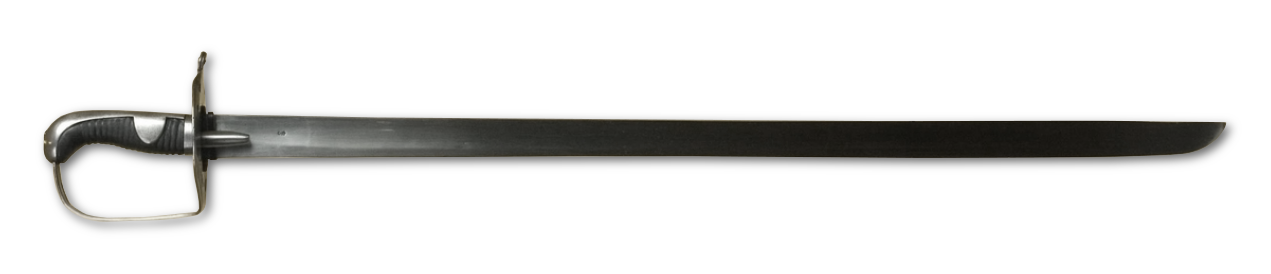
Swedish cavalry pallasch m/1808 – a British pattern 1796 heavy cavalry sword purchased by Sweden in 1808.

A backsword, or pallasch (British Army: heavy cavalry sword), is a type of cavalry sword, characterised by having a sabre-style hilt with a single-handed grip, but with a long straight blade, allowing it to effectively thrust in a cavalry charge. In oversimplified terms, a backsword could be called a straight sabre, and vice versa, the sabre a curved backsword.

== Etymology ==
Backsword is so called because the sword initially was single-edged, where the triangular cross section gives a flat back edge opposite the cutting edge (cf. German: Rückenklinge, "single-edged blade", lit. 'back blade'; Swedish: enbak, "single-edged sword/knife: seax, backsword", lit. 'single-back'). The name entered the English language before sabre did, and thus early encounters with eastern sabres like scimitars, shamshirs, and thereof, came to be known as "crooked backsword", "half-moon backsword" and "hald-crescent backsword".

The name pallasch stems from Hungarian: pallos, pallas ("backsword, broadsword"), which is drived from Turkish: pala, a type of cavalry cutlass, likewise single-edged, from Latin: pāla ("broad blade, shovel"). It is the common name for the type in most European languages: French: palache, German: Pallasch, Danish: pallask, Swedish: pallasch (/palɑːɕ/, /palaɕ/, /palatɕ/), Polish: pałasz, Russian: палаш (palaš). In English, the term pallasch first entered the language fairly recently via the collectors market.

The similarities to the sabre, however, means that the weapon is often called that. A 1667 Swedish name is pälax-sabel ("pallasch-sabre"). In pop-culture, the erronously named anime Saber Rider and the Star Sheriffs features a protagonist who wields a backsword, not a saber.

== History and design ==
From around the early 14th century, the backsword became the first type of European sword to be fitted with a knuckle guard. Being easier and cheaper to make than double-edged swords, backswords became the favored sidearm of common infantry, including irregulars such as the Highland Scots, which in Scottish Gaelic were called the claidheamh cuil (back sword), after one of several terms for the distinct types of weapons they used. Backswords were often the secondary weapons of European cavalrymen beginning in the 17th century.

Despite being single-edged, and so named, later examples often have a "false edge" on the back near the tip, which was in many cases sharpened to make an actual edge and facilitate thrusting attacks. Some examples likewise were designed with a double-edged tip for thrusting.

The British heavy cavalry adopted the design in 1786 as the 1796 Heavy Cavalry Trooper's Sword. It was a direct copy of the Austrian pattern of 1769 pallasch for heavy cavalry. It was copied by cavalry officer John Le Marchant (who also designed the curved 1796 pattern light cavalry sabre), after whitnessing the Austrian weapon in use during the Low Countries Campaign of 1793-95, when he also made many drawings of Austrian cavalry equipment. The board of general officers initially denied to arm the heavy cavalry with a straight sword, but ultimately adopted the Austrian sword as a model. It is probable, once a straight sword had been decided upon, that he then suggested the Austrian sword as a model.

The term "backsword" can also refer to the singlestick, which is used to train for fighting with the backsword, or to the sport or art of fighting in this fashion. Backswording was an alternative term for singlesticking tournaments in England.

== See also ==
- Classifications of swords
  - Types of swords
  - List of swords
- Basket-hilted swords
- Cutlass
- Dusack
- Falchion
- Golok
- Machete
- Messer
- Parang
- Sabre
- Shamshir
- Szabla
- Shashka

== General references ==
- Dwelly's Illustrated Gaelic to English Dictionary. Glasgow: Gairm Publications, 1988, p. 202
- Culloden: the swords and the sorrows. Glasgow: The National Trust for Scotland, 1996
