= Scythe sword =

Type of sword

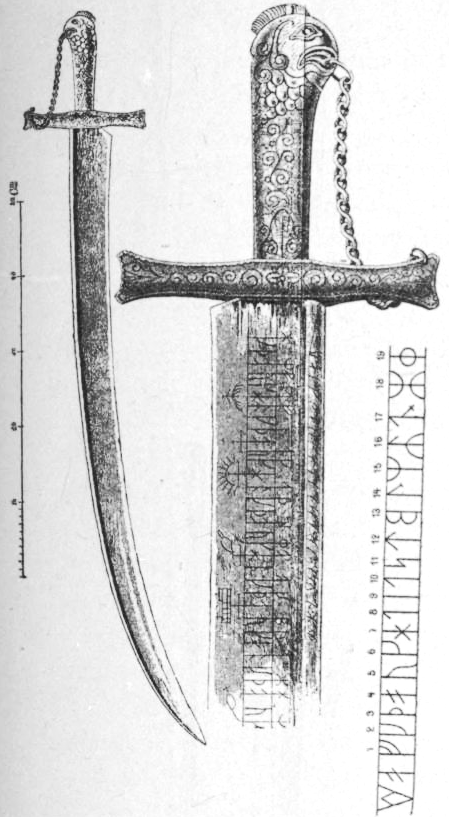
The scythe sword of Thomas Müntzer and a representation of the "summer" half of its runic calendar.

The scythe sword (Sensenschwert) was a type of single-edged sword of the German Renaissance, related to the dussack. It consisted of the blade of a scythe to which a sword hilt was attached. Like the falx or falcata of antiquity, it was thus a curved sword with the cutting edge on the inside (as opposed to the scimitar or sabre type with the edge on the outside).

The only known surviving example of a true scythe sword (its blade being made from an actual scythe), is that of Thomas Müntzer (1489–1525), kept in the Historical Museum, Dresden. This sword has a representation of a runic calendar incised on the blade. Demmin (1893) notes the existence of other sword blades of the early 16th century bearing runic calendars in Berlin, Vienna, Paris, Munich, Graz and Luxembourg.

== See also ==
- Single-edged sword (disambiguation)
