= Balasiong =

- Type: Sword
- Place of origin: Philippines

Service history
- Used by: Moro peoples

Specifications
- Length: 17.5 in (44 cm)
- Blade type: Double-edged
- Hilt type: hardwood, carabao horn
- Scabbard/sheath: hardwood

Balasiong (also spelled balacion, baliciong, or balisiong) is a Filipino sword used by Muslim Filipino ethnolinguistic groups (the Moro people) in the Southern Philippines. It is a type of kalis but differs in that the double-edged blade is not straight or wavy but instead slightly convex. It also tapers sharply to the tip. The hilt is slightly curved, an element known as the kakatua (cockatoo).

== See also ==
- Kalis
- Punyal
- Kampilan
- Panabas
