= Ikakalaka =

Type of African sword

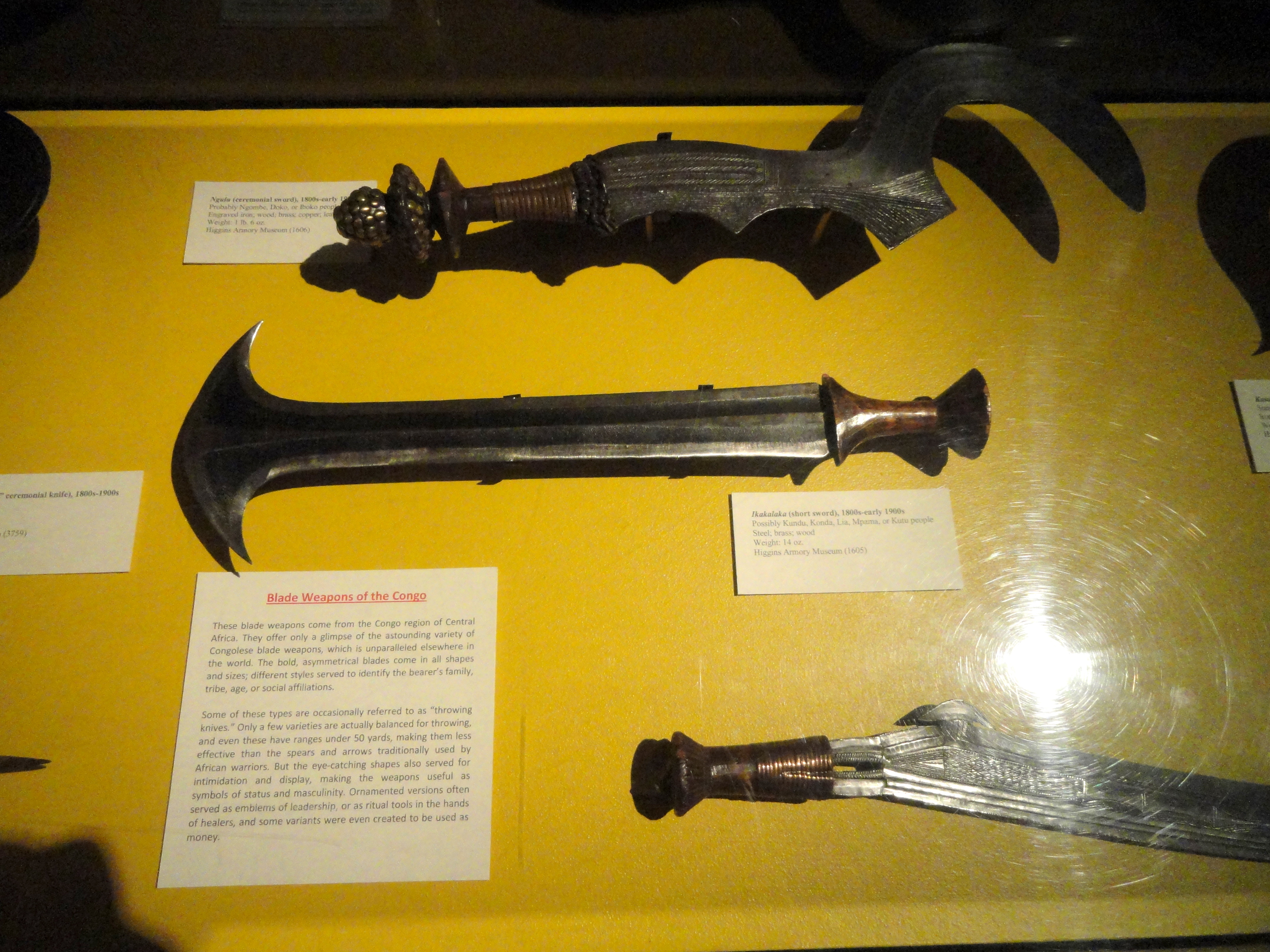
Picture of an Ikakalaka (middle)

Ikakalaka, also called the African Konda sword, is a type of sword which originated in the 19th century among the Mongo people in the northwestern parts of what is now the Democratic Republic of the Congo. They come in a variety of shapes and sizes, and are known for the ornamentation on the blade. It has become a staple of popular culture in the 21st century thanks to its blade design and shape.

== Etymology ==
The name Konda, which means hunter in their native language, is believed to have been derived from the same Konda people in the tropical jungle of the Democratic Republic of the Congo, which could have constructed the sword.

== History ==
Congo's pre-colonial era, like the Kingdom of Lunda, saw the employment of various African swords in battle. Some swords and blades used in ceremonial contexts displayed the power of leaders and kings and were used heavily for trading. When colonization began, there was a ban on most edged weapons, and only the highly ceremonial and prestigious weapons were allowed, which led to the popularity of the Konda sword.

== Uses ==
Beyond their use as weapons, some Kondas were used as symbols of social status among both men and women. They could also be used for village celebrations, rituals, sacrifices, and executions. The variety of uses led to a variety of shapes and sizes among Konda swords. The ability of the blacksmith, the person's ethnic background, and the weapon's intended use all affected the final form of the blade.

== In fiction ==
1. Megatron used an Ikakalaka sword in Transformers: The Last Knight.
1. An Ikakalaka sword alongside an iklwa spear, both with blades of vibranium, by the Marvel Cinematic version of Erik Killmonger in Black Panther.
1. Providence from Risk of Rain uses a large Ikakalaka sword with a black handle and a cyan blade.
1. In Prince of Persia: Warrior Within, The Prince obtains an Ikakalaka called "The Spider Sword" as his third primary weapon in the game.
