= Pinutí =

Filipino weapon

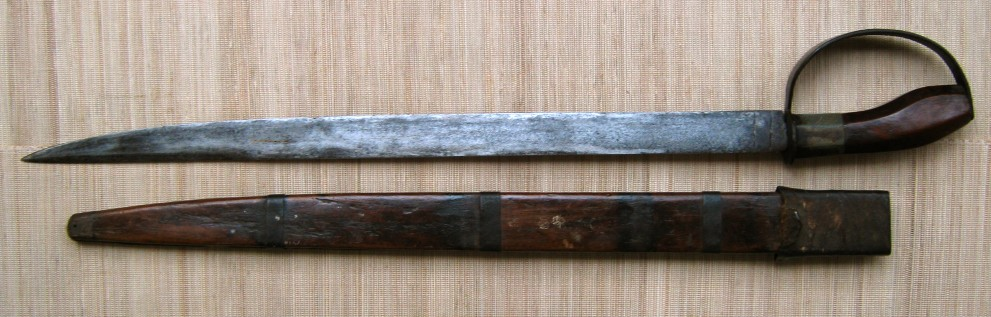
An antique Visayan pinuti. The D-guard is iron and the ferrule is brass. Overall length is 579 mm (22.8 inches). The scabbard is made of wood, with a leather 'throat'.

The Pinutí is a Filipino bolo-type sword from the Visayas, Philippines. The weapon was originally intended as an agricultural implement. The grip is usually made of guava wood, which is light. The blade itself is approximately 16 to 18 inches (40 to 45 cm) long.

Pinutí is Cebuano for "whitened". As a farm implement, it would take on a dark patina due to contact with plant and animal fluids. When farmers sharpened their blades for combat, the blade was polished clean and white.

Certain decorative motifs on some pinutí scabbards have been interpreted as representing Bakunawa/Lahò imagery or, alternatively, a seahorse associated with dragon symbolism.

== See also ==
- Filipino martial arts
- Bolo
- Kampilan
- Kalis
- Panabas
