= Bicuco =

Traditional Filipino weapon

- Type: Sword
- Place of origin: Philippines

Service history
- Used by: Filipino (Tarlac, Pangasinan and La Union)

Specifications
- Length: 25 in (64 cm)
- Blade type: Single edge
- Hilt type: wood
- Scabbard/sheath: wood

Bicuco (also spelled, Bikuko) is a traditional Filipino ethnic weapon in the province of Tarlac, Pangasinan and La Union. It has a sharp-edged blade made of high-carbon steel, with the edge and its long false edge sharpened with a polished wood grip. It is a long knife intended as a working knife used primarily for slaughtering livestock animals and preparing meat. As a weapon, this long knife doubles as a self defense knife that can cut a body quite handily.
