= Luwuk (sword) =

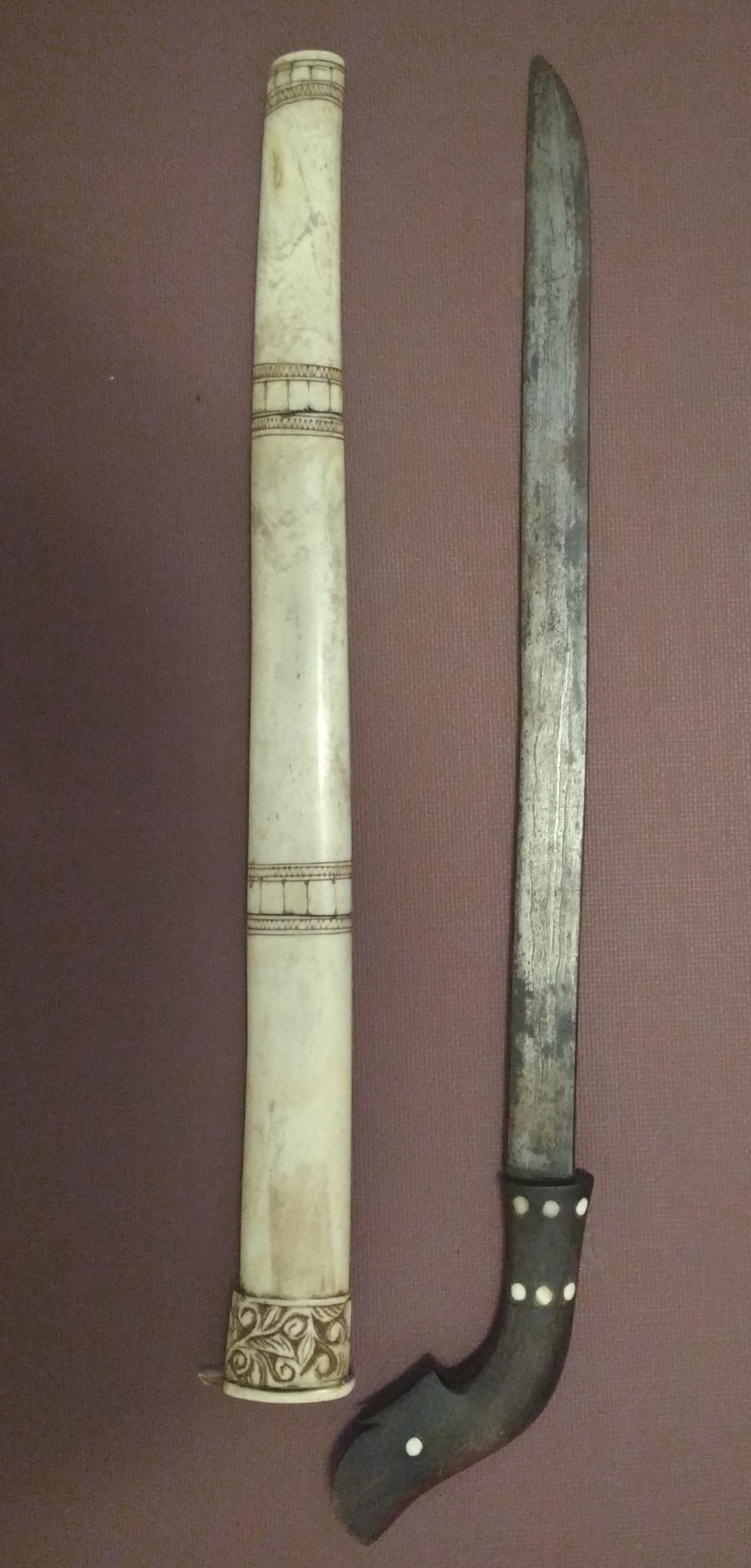
- Type: Sword
- Place of origin: Indonesia (Java)

Service history
- Used by: Javanese people

Specifications
- Length: not more than 85 cm (33 in)
- Blade type: Single edge, convex grind
- Hilt type: Water buffalo horn, wood
- Scabbard/sheath: Water buffalo horn, wood

A luwuk is a type of short sword from the island of Java. This sword is found mostly in East Java and Central Java.

== Descriptions ==
The luwuk is a straight, single-edged sword. The blade of the sword (known as "wilah") maintains the same width from the base to the tip, but there are also luwuk swords with blades that are smaller from the middle of the blade up. The blade is forged from pamor steel or Damascus steel. The tip of the blade tapers like a knife but does so to appear as if it is held backward (i.e. the blade faces the wielder). The luwuk's handle is made from wood or animal horn. The overall length of the luwuk is not more than 85 cm (33 in).

== See also ==
- Alamang
- Dua Lalan
