= Ram-dao (Khaḍga) =

South Asian sacrificial sword

Khadga
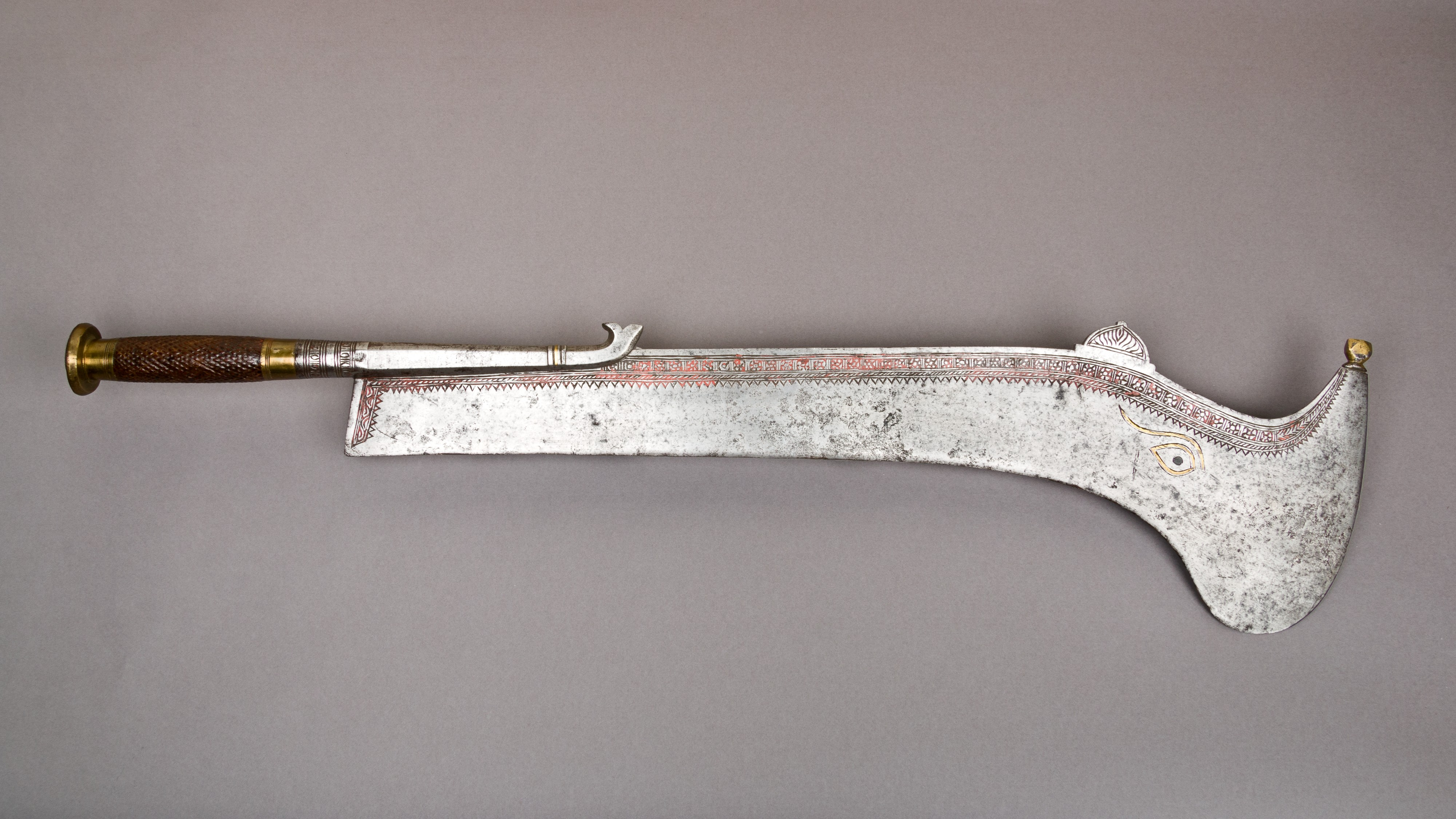
- A khadga on display at the Metropolitan Museum of Art

Khadga is a traditional sacrificial sword used in the Hindu ritual sacrifice of animals. The large, curved blade is designed to decapitate a sacrificial animal in a single stroke. Khadgas are used in a hacking swing, with the added weight on the curved end being intended for decapitations. The sword's hilt and blade were often adorned with precious stones and metals.

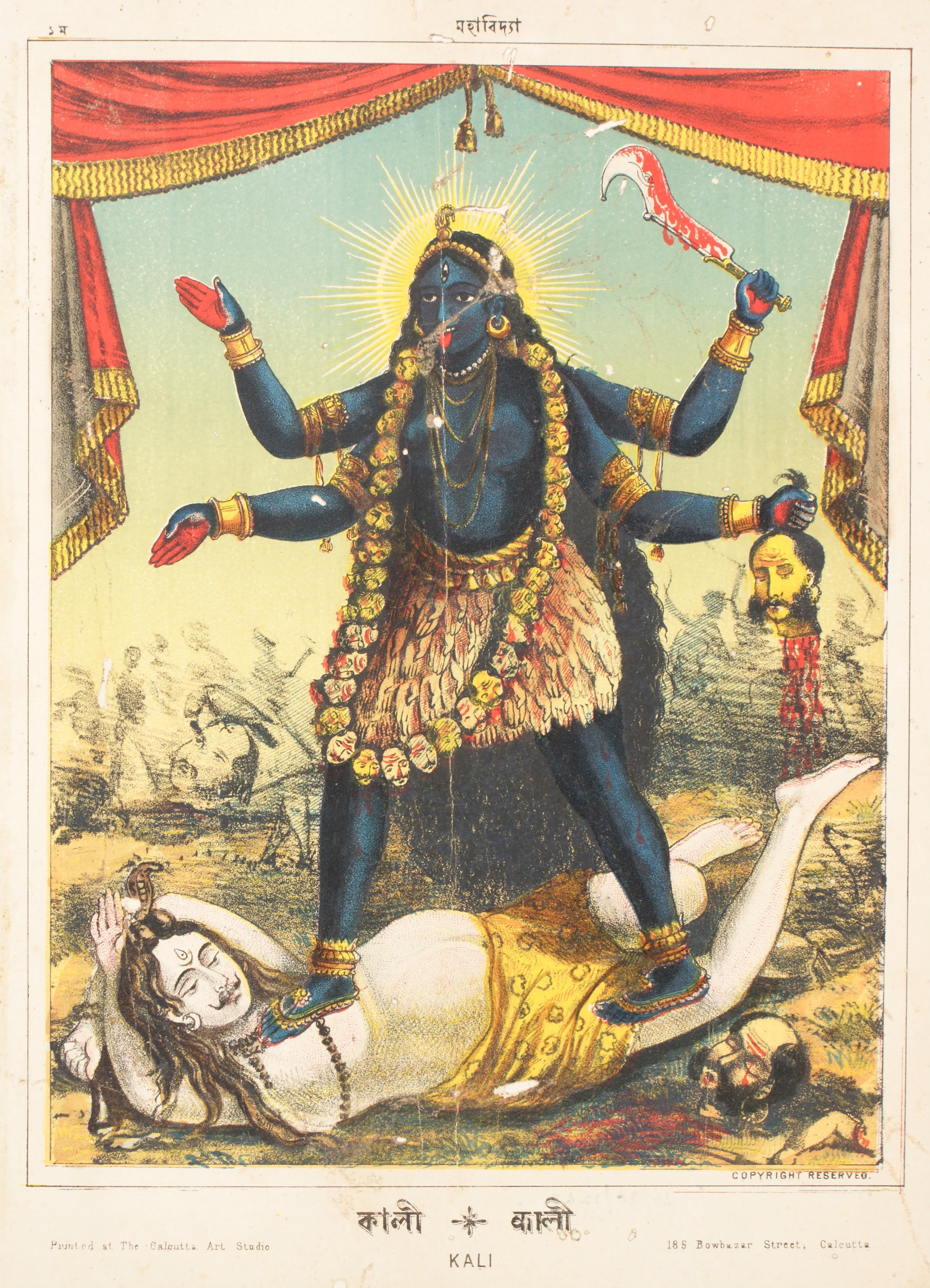
Dakshina Kali (19th-century)

Khadgas are often depicted in Hindu religious imagery, often being wielded by the goddesses Durga and Kali. The sword is often embellished with religious imagery, symbols, and texts. This type of ritual sword was used widely by cultures in multiple regions including: Assam, Bengal, Odisha, East India, Nepal, and North India.
