= Paramerion =

Sword used in Byzantine Empire

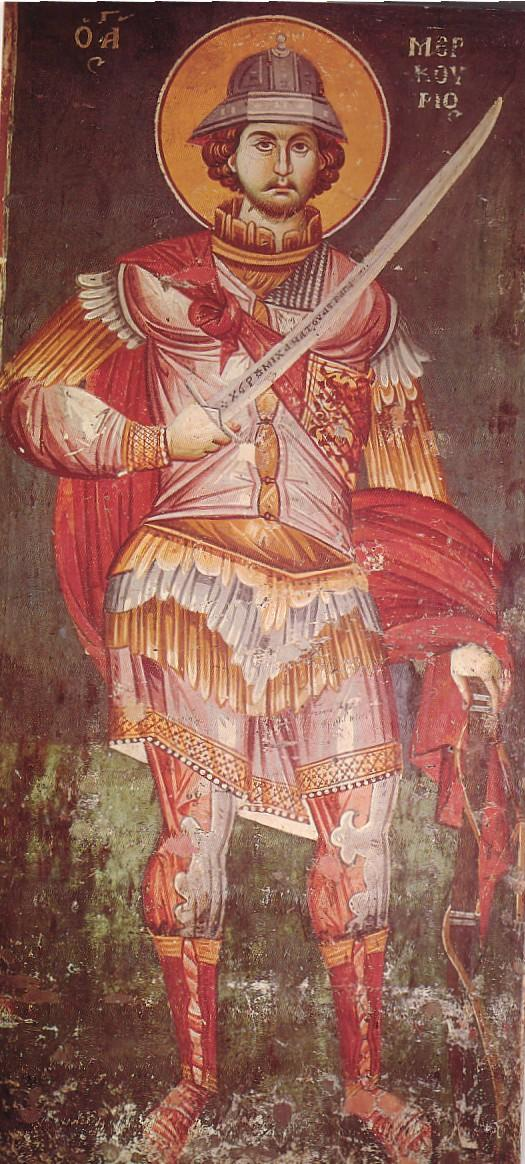
A Byzantine fresco of Saint Mercurius armed with a paramerion, dated 1295, from Ohrid, North Macedonia

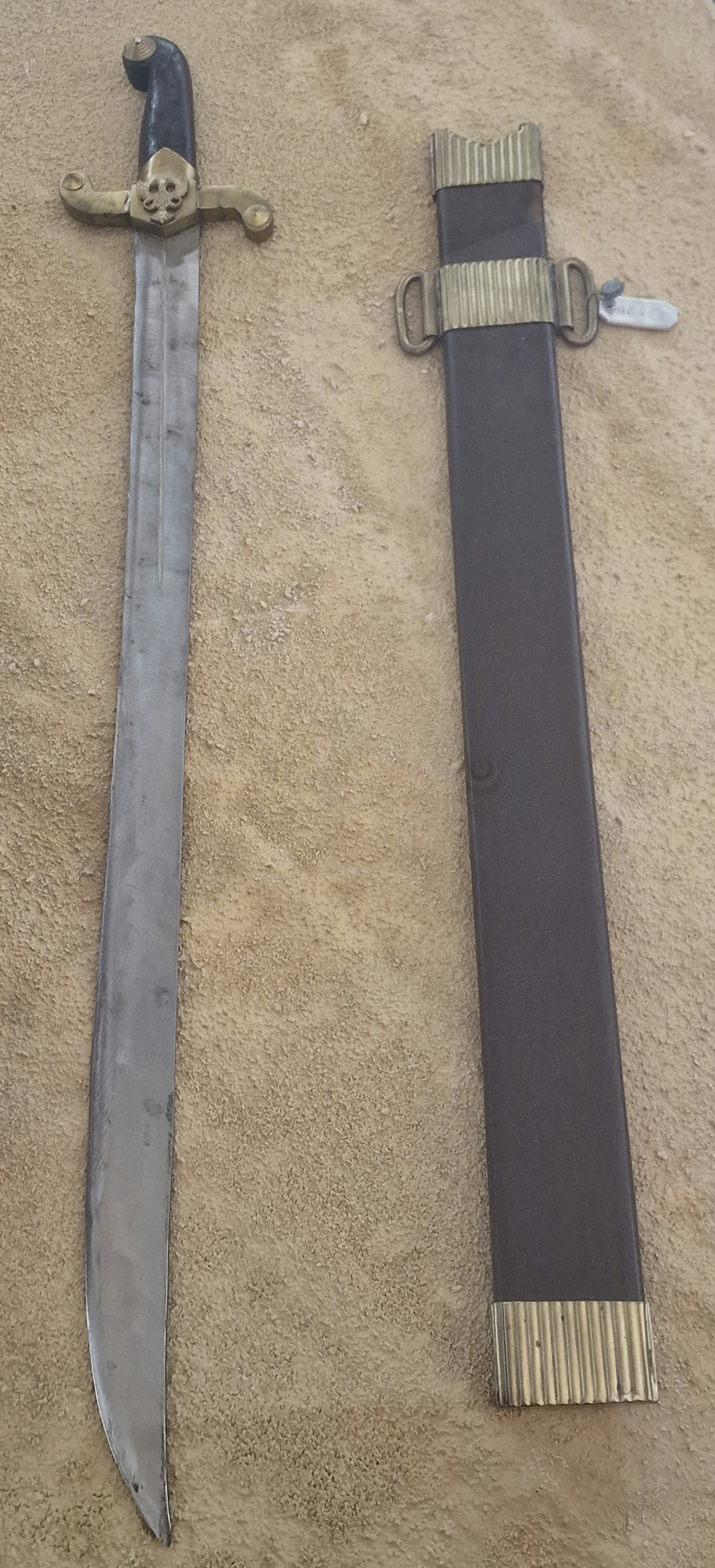
Replica of a 15th century paramerion sword, from the Athens War Museum

The paramerion (Medieval Greek: Παραμήριον) was a saber-like curved sword.The name paramerion means 'by the thigh', this may reflect that it was worn suspended by slings from a waist-belt, rather than the usual baldric employed by Byzantines for straight double-edged swords.
