= Dahong palay =

Filipino sword

Dahong Palay
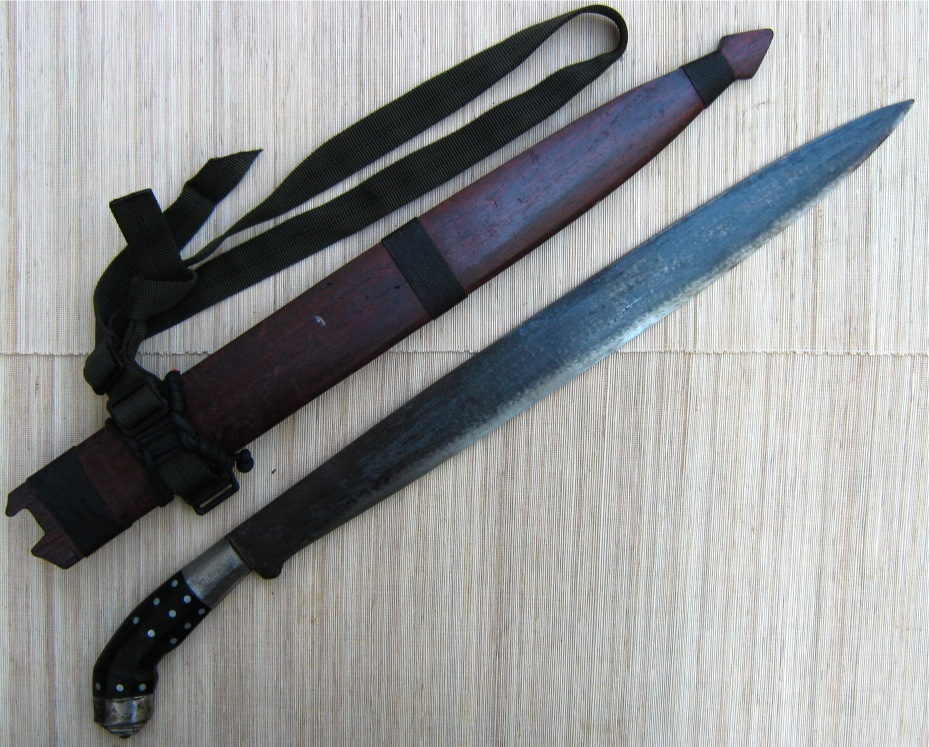
- A contemporary dahong palay, from Majayjay. Overall length is 20 inches (50 cm). The hilt is made from carabao horn, and the scabbard is made from narra.
- Type: Sword
- Place of origin: Philippines

Specifications
- Length: 18-30 in. (45-75 cm)
- Blade type: Single-edged, straight bladed, pointed tipped; a normal blade
- Hilt type: Full tang
- Scabbard/sheath: Wood
- Haft type: Wood

The dahong palay (also spelled dinahong palay, dahon palay or dahompalay), literally "rice leaf" in Tagalog, is a single-edged bolo-type sword from the Tagalog provinces of the Philippines. It was originally used by farmers to clear thick grass growth. However, during the Philippine revolution of 1896, farmers from Batangas soon came to favor it for its "slashing and thrusting" feel.

== Etymology ==
The sword's name could either be a reference to the similarity of its shape to the leaves of rice or to local green "dahong palay" snakes, purported to be extremely venomous. The snake is probably the green specimen of the Philippine pit viper (trimeresurus flavomaculatus), though sometimes identified as various relatively harmless green snakes, like vine snakes.

== Physical description ==
The dahong palay's size is about the same as most Filipino swords such as the kalis, golok, or ginunting, measuring about twenty to thirty inches.

=== Blade ===
The blade is single-edged and has what is classified as a normal blade pattern – that is, it has a curved cutting edge, and a back which is virtually flat at the tip.

The width of the blade is at its fullest at the hand guard, and from there the sharp edge tapers smoothly, with only the slightest curve or "belly" as it moves towards the tip of the sword. In contrast, the back of the blade only begins to curve downward as it nears the hilt, which in turn also curves downwards, completing the "rice leaf" tapering profile of the sword.

The tip of this "rice leaf" profile is an acute and very sharp point, which gives the blade its penetrating capability when used in a thrusting motion. The balance and steep profile of the sword, in turn, gives it its cutting ability when used in a slashing motion.

=== Hilt ===
The sword's full tang is embedded in a long hilt, traditionally made of kamagong wood. As previously explained, this hilt tilts downwards, contributing to the sword's unique profile. Aside from that, however, the exact shape of the hilt, varies significantly from piece to piece, with the pommel and grip not always distinct parts of the hilt, and a crossguard that isn't present in all pieces. In addition, the dahong palay's origins as an agricultural tool means that the hilts are often simple and practical, rather than ornate as is often the case in the kalis or kampilan.

== In history ==
The dahong palay was initially used for agricultural work since pre-colonial times, and later on, was used for dambana practices as well. As a weapon, the dahong palay was a mainstay during the many conflicts that have plagued the Southern Tagalog region since its first use during the Philippine revolution against the Spanish – used by farmer-warriors whenever they could not acquire firearms. It is noted for having been used by Filipino soldiers under the Philippine Commonwealth Army and Philippine Constabulary units and the recognized guerrillas in the region during World War II.

== Gallery ==
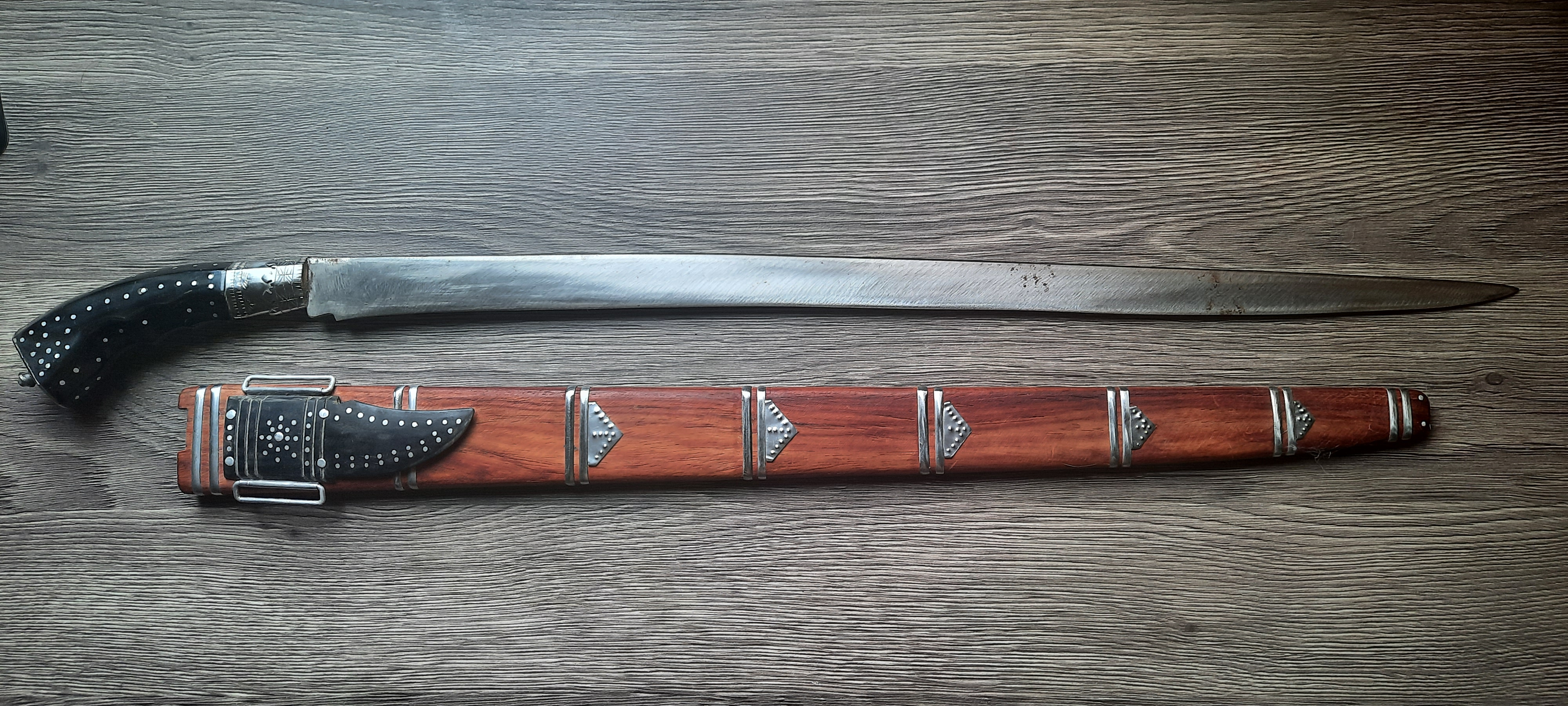
Dahong palay from Binangonan, Rizal

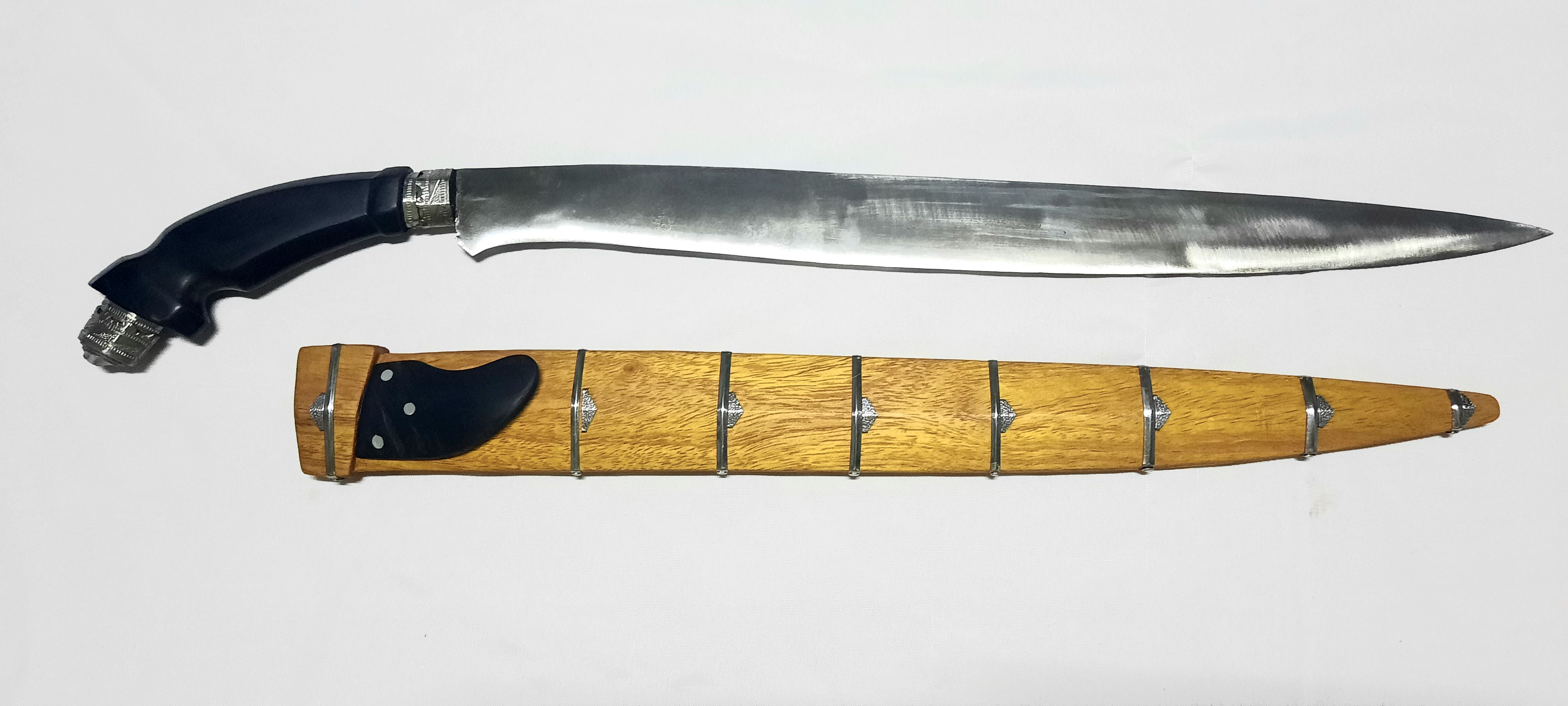
Dahong palay from Tanay, Rizal

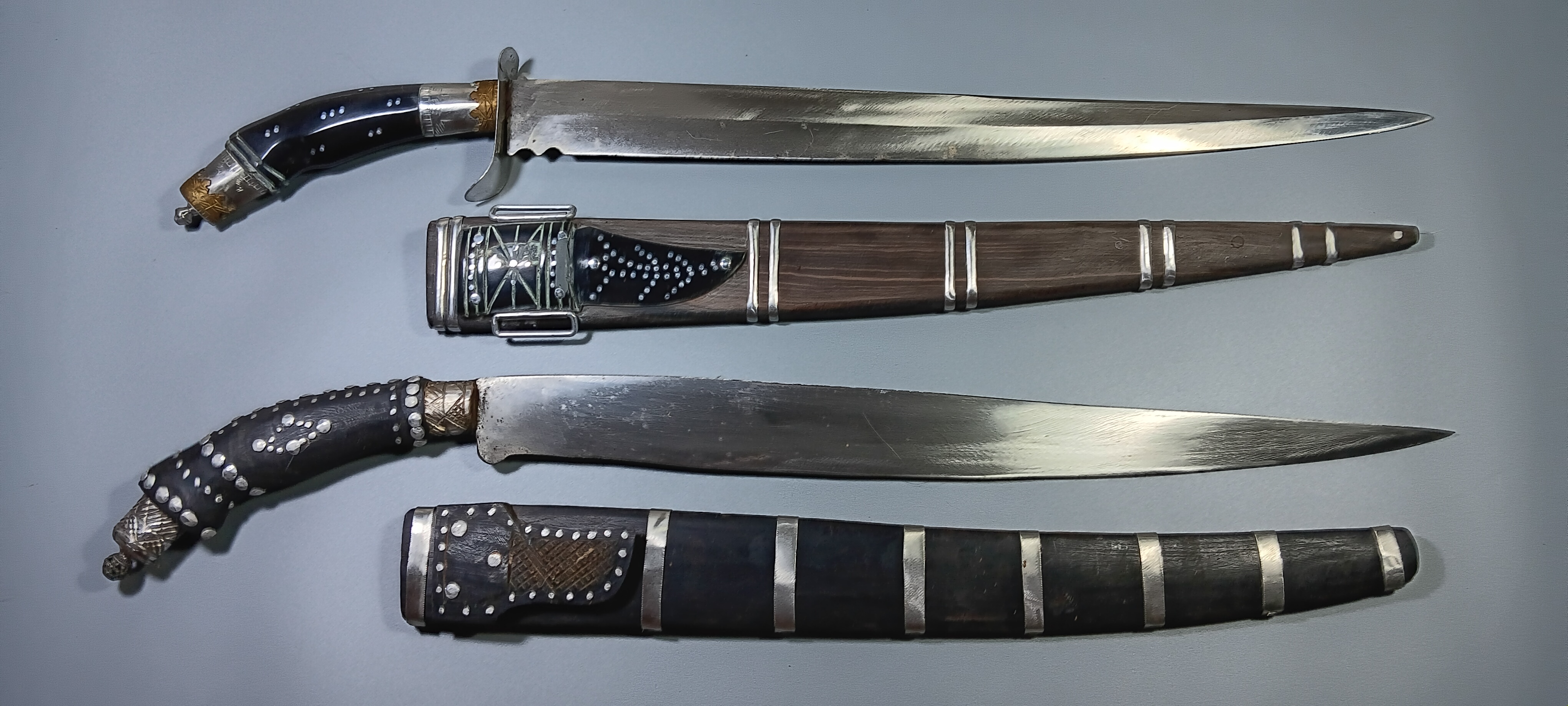
Dagger-length dahong palay from Rizal province

== See also ==
List of Filipino weaponry

- Bolo
- Golok
- Kalis
- Kampilan

Filipino martial arts

Military history of the Philippines
