= Batangas (sword) =

- Type: Sword
- Place of origin: Philippines

Specifications
- Length: 24 to 28 in (61 to 71 cm)
- Blade type: Single-edged

The batangas or batangas malapad, is a sword originating from the Tagalog people of the Philippines. It is a type of bolo that widens near the tip. It is around 24 to 28 in (61 to 71 cm) long with a hooked hilt grip.

== See also ==
- Pirah
- Weapons of Moroland
