= Patag (sword) =

Type of Asian sword

- Type: Sword
- Place of origin: Bhutan

Service history
- In service: ca. 600–present

Specifications
- Length: ~86 cm blade:~66 cm
- Width: 33–40 mm (1.3–1.6 in)
- Blade type: Single-edged, straight-bladed
- Hilt type: One-handed, with pommel

A patag, also known as patang, is a type of Asian sword characterized as having a straight single-edged blade. Patags are traditionally produced in Bhutan.

== Characteristics ==
Bhutanese swords are straight, the blade is single-edged with a sharp arc tip. The blade is thicker near the hilt compared to the tip. Patags are about 6 millimeters thick at the hilt and about 2 millimeters at the tip. The blade tends to be between 0.6 and 0.7 meters (2.0 and 2.3 ft) in length. Most patags are striated with small grooves called washo. At least eleven types of patag exist. The types are named after the blacksmith who first forged them, the locality they originated, appearance, design or utility. The patag is regarded as a symbol of authority, serving as a ceremonial weapon for male parliament members and high ranking government officials, including the royal family. During the reign of Jigme Namgyal and Tongsa Penlop Ugyen Wangchuck, swords that were used in action during wars were marked with a cross. The mark was placed on the blunt side of the sword, near the hilt. The dripcha or "defiled swords" are especially valued.

Patag types include:

- Paksam Tenzin
- Chukhap Tenzin
- Bumthang Tsen-dri
- Nagpha
- Dungsum Thum
- Barshongpa
- Thum
- Chhu Chenm
- Lungdri
- Lungdri Chenm

== Production ==
The regions of Chakor La and Barshong were the main source of iron ore used by Bhutanese blacksmiths. The process of melting the iron took from a week to a month, depending on the size of the furnace. The iron's quality depended heavily on the type of wood used during smelting.

Newly crafted swords were rubbed multiple times with different materials in order to remove stains, moisture and impurities. As a result of rubbing the patag received an ash black colour. Scabbards were covered with dyed frog, cow and other wild animal pelts. Hilts were crafted of willow and walnut wood, bearing an octagonal shape.

== Lungdri Chenm ==
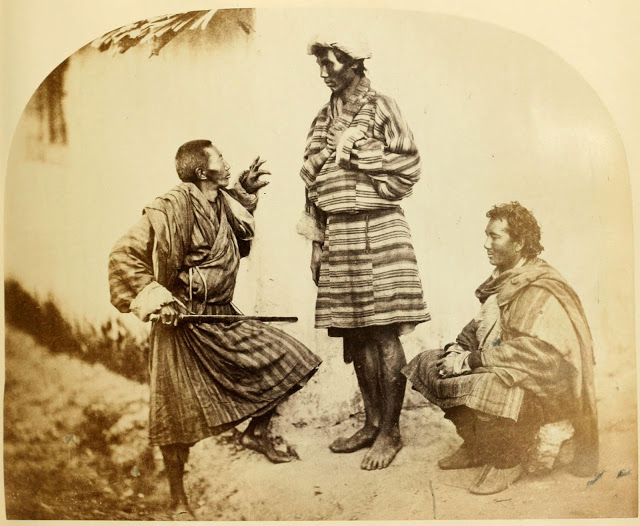
A Bhutanese chief bearing a patag

Lungdri Chenm is a semi legendary type of patag, believed to be first forged by Dupthob Jangkha Lap. According to the legend Jangkha Lap resided in the Chimi Thangkha village, located in the outskirts of Thimphu. One day Jangkha Lap forged a very light and flexible patag, which he later presented to the local governor. After hearing Jangkha Lap praise his creation, the governor demanded to test the sword on the swordsmith himself. A single strike cut Jangkha Lap in half. The story survived as an oral tradition.

It is believed that Jangkha Lap practised the tradition of zokor. Personally extracting the iron ore and then traveling from village to village, selling his wares. Jangkha Lap is regarded as the patron of blacksmiths in the country, caves formerly used by blacksmiths are considered sacred by the local population.

Three Lungri Chenm swords remain. The first specimen is stored in the Dechen Phodrang monastery, located in Thimphu. The second is located in the Punakha Dzong. The third piece is held by the Talo Gyalp statue, inside the Talo monastery. It is not known whether these swords were forged by Jangkha Lap or one of his disciples.

== Restoration efforts ==
On 22 February 2002, American sword expert Julian Freeman was invited by the National Technical Training Authority to visit Bhutan in order to aid patag study and restoration efforts. Freeman and smiths from Thimphu, Paro, Wangduephodrang, Dagana, Tsirang and Trashiyangtse conducted a workshop, aiming to revive the art of patag smithing. The techniques behind the creation of patags as well as their original use remain unclear.

The tradition behind Bhutan's sword making dates back to at least the 6th century A.D. Valuable information about the swords has been lost through prolonged polishing. Apart from crude reproductions of little known origin, patags are no longer produced. Today patags can be found in private collections, old monasteries within Bhutan, and museums.

== Foreign collections ==
Patags are exhibited in the Metropolitan Museum of Art and the Royal Canadian Geographical Society museums.
