= Ngulu (weapon) =

African curved execution sword

A Ngulu is an execution sword used by the Bantu peoples (including the Ngombe, Doko, Ngala, etc.) of the Congo Basin.

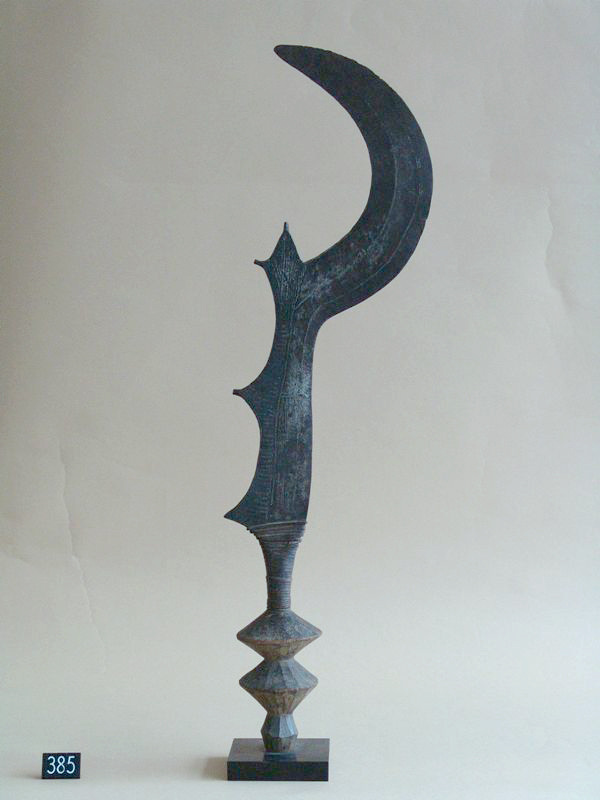
Ngulu

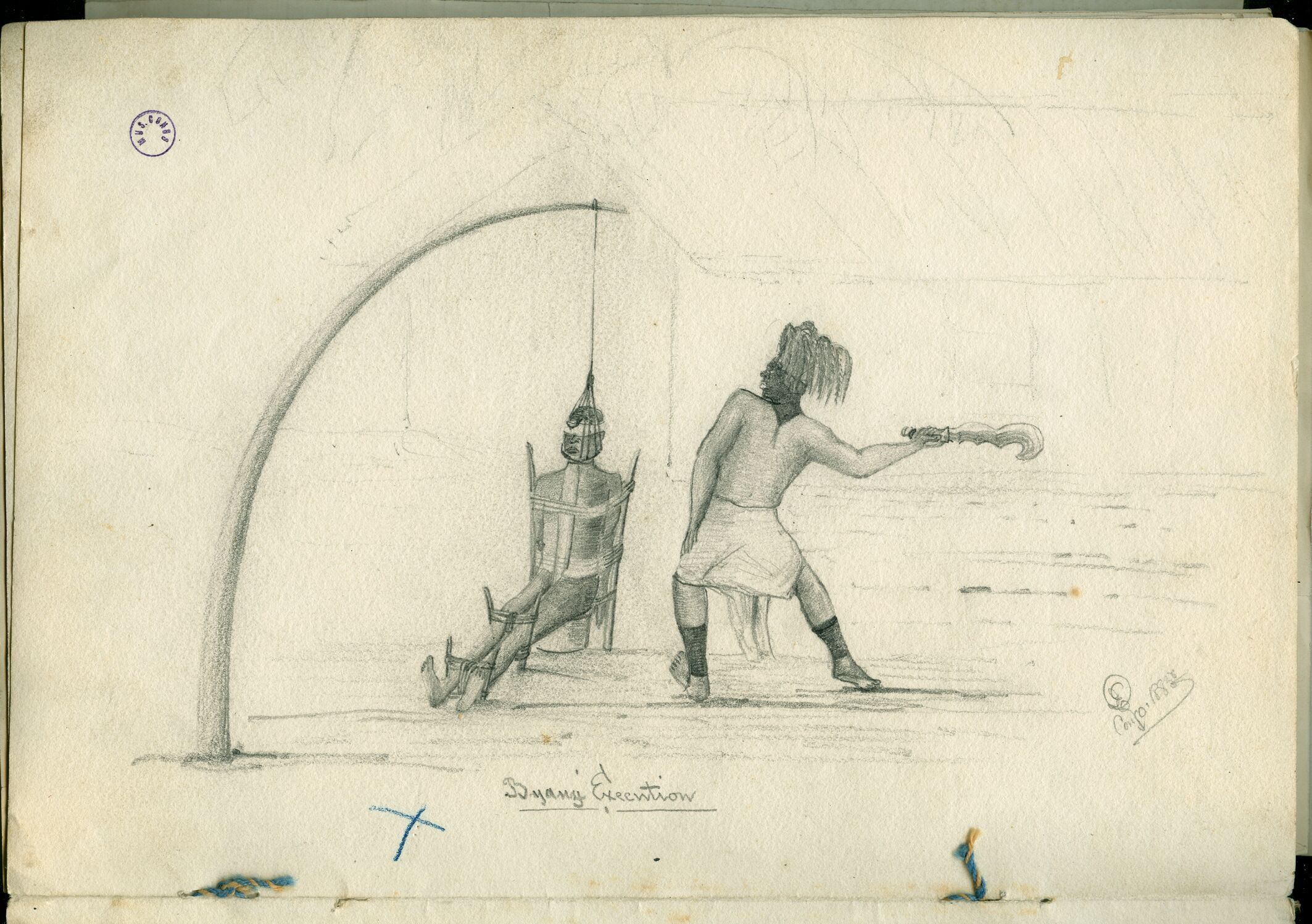
Execution by Edward James Glave

== Uses ==
It resembles the Khopesh, the sickle-sword of ancient Egypt, except that it has a much more massive blade, made of iron, with a non-cutting back and a semi-circular concavity. The handle, often surrounded by metal wire, ended with two large wooden buttons and a smaller one. It could be one or two blades and was used for capital executions by beheading (the condemned was kept seated, head extended and attached to a branch).: This design was selected for cult and execution knives. A knife was created which symbolized the inexorableness on the judgment and execution. This execution knife became a symbol of power and, in a few variations became a ceremonial knife for tribal chieftains. At executions, the condemned man was tied to the ground with ropes and poles. His head was fastened with leather straps to a bent tree branch. In this way it was ensured that the man's neck would remain stretched. After the decapitation, the head would be automatically catapulted far away.

== History ==
The Ngulu beheading was forbidden by the Belgians during the Free State of Congo period (1885–1908). The weapon, deprived of its function, took an even stronger symbolic and ceremonial value. From the 20th century, the Ngulu was worn during the ritual dance known as Likbeti, at the end of which the weapon was used to decapitate a goat whose flesh was then consumed by the whole tribe.

== Gallery ==
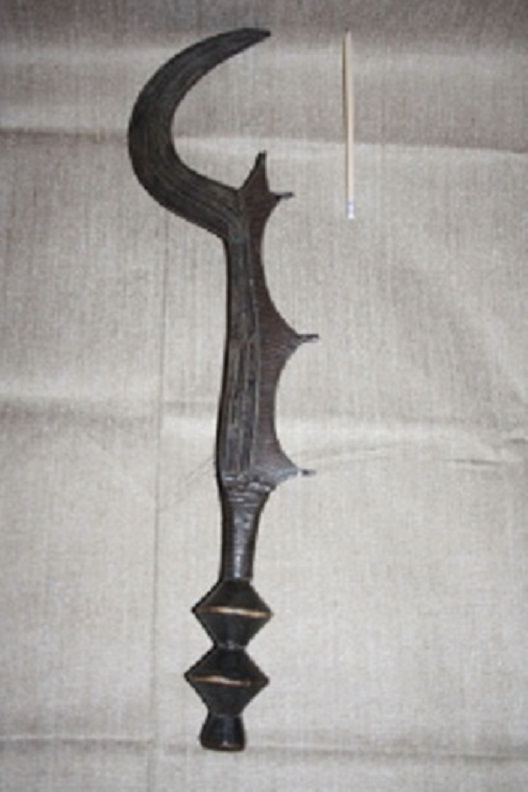
Ngulu of the Ngombe people

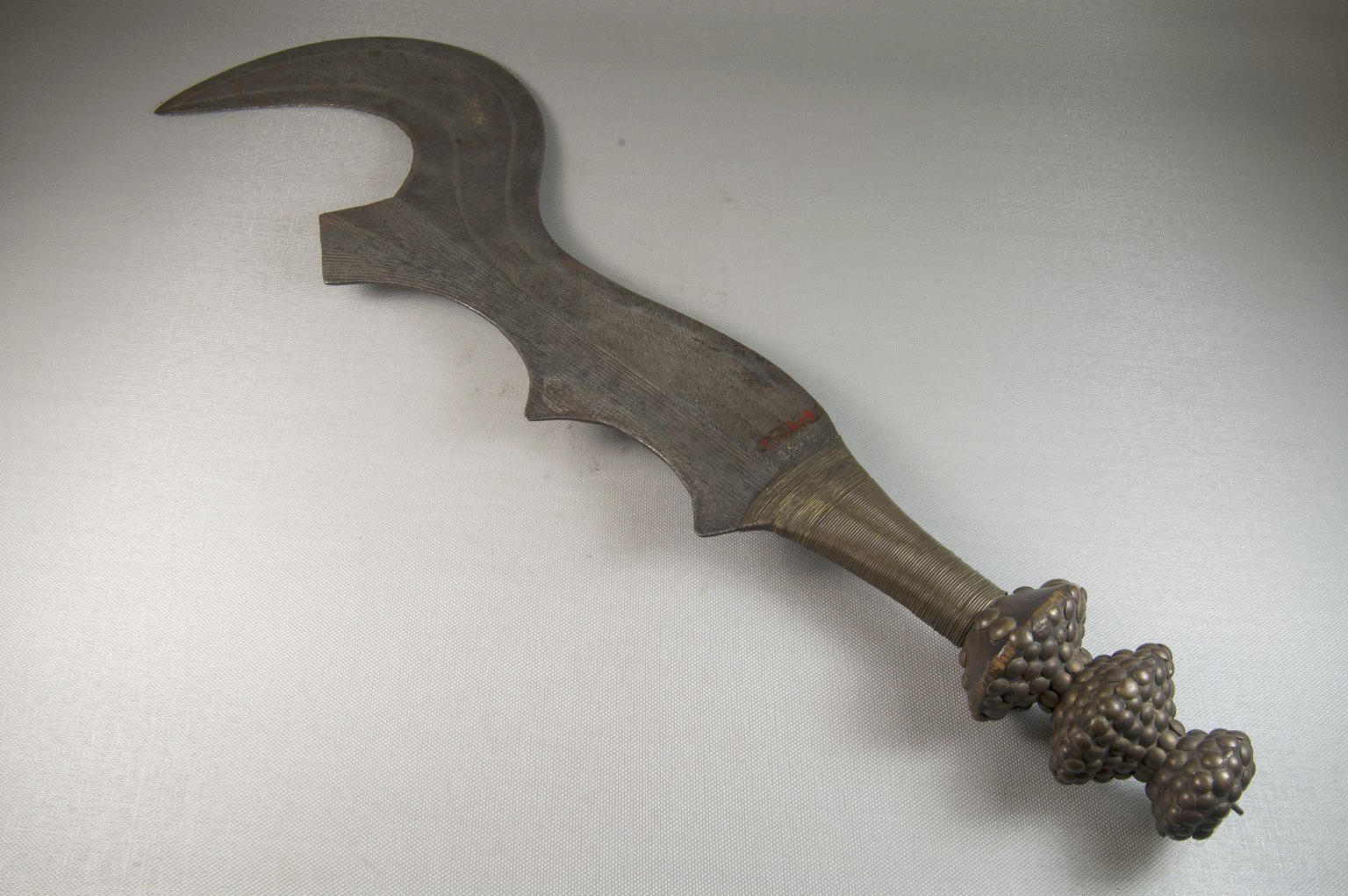
Ngulu in the Brooklyn Museum

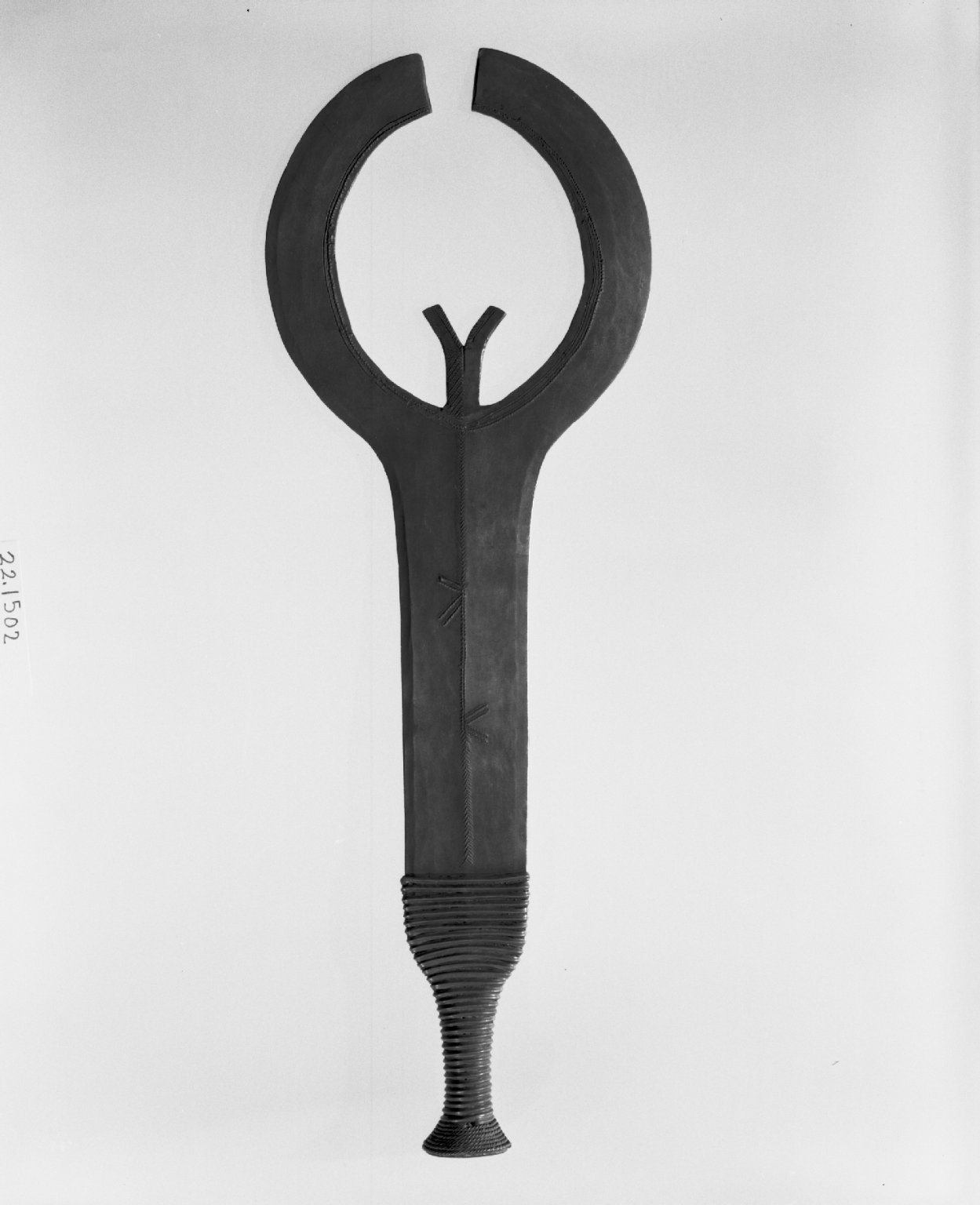
Double bladed Ngulu, ceremonial use

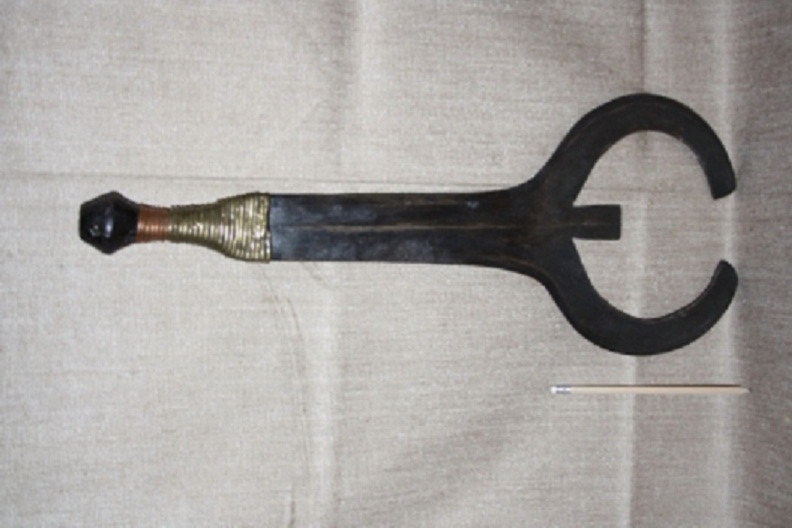
Double bladed Ngulu with pencil for scale

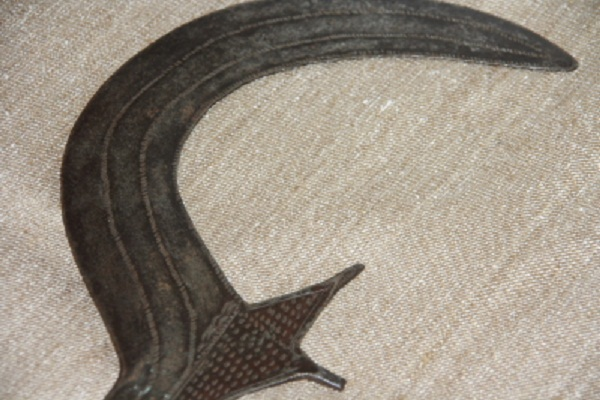
Ngulu, close up image with blade details

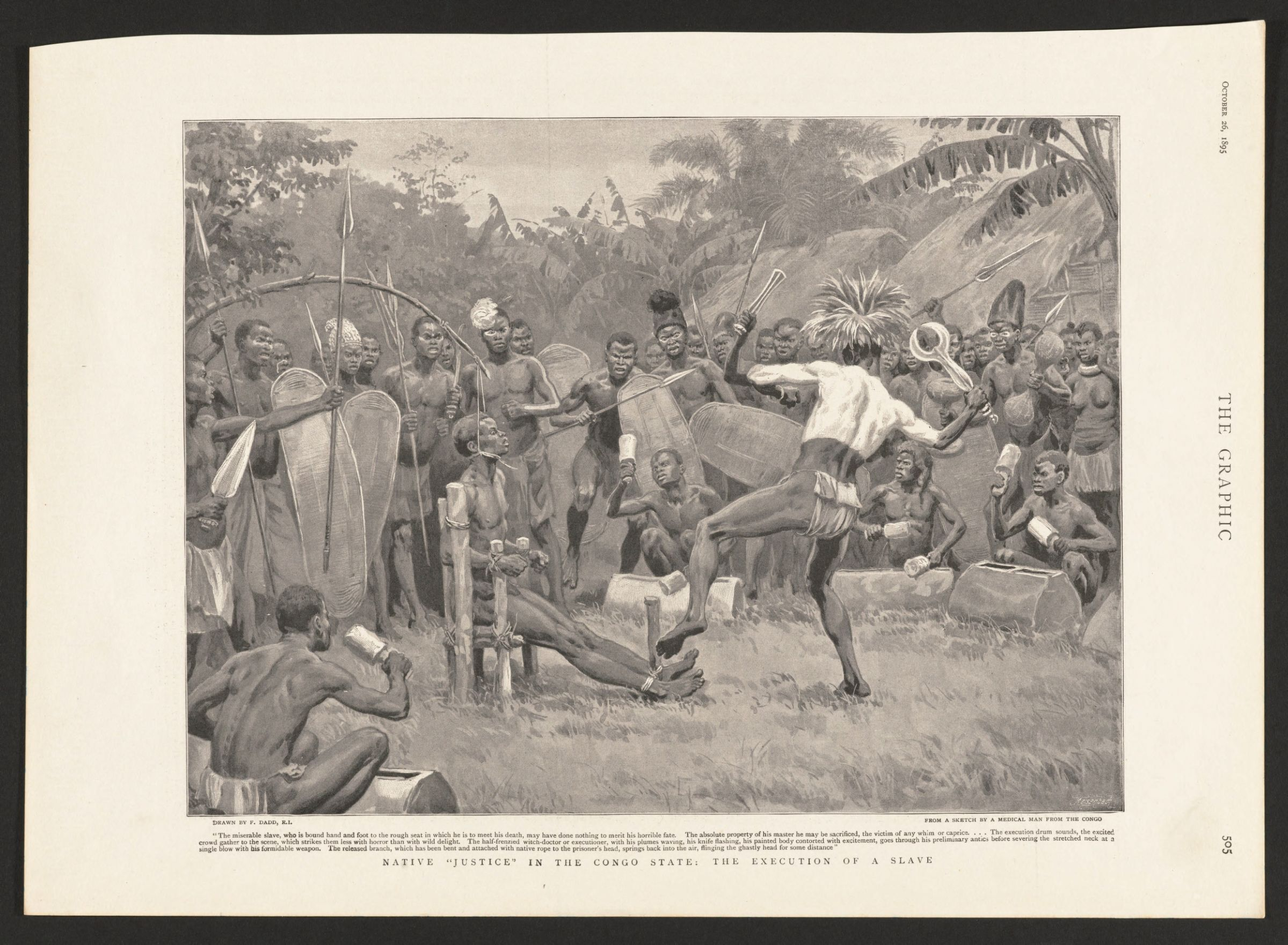
European illustrations were not necessarily realistic. Here, the artist gathers different weapons: a double ngulu from the North-West, swords from the South and spears from the North-East of the Congo.
