= Lahot =

- Type: Sword
- Place of origin: Philippines

Service history
- Used by: Moro people

Specifications
- Length: 24 to 28 in (61 to 71 cm)
- Blade type: Single edge
- Hilt type: wood
- Scabbard/sheath: wood

Lahot also called Gamong is a traditional Filipino ethnic Moro weapon. It is a long, thin one handed sword designed for slashing and thrusting. The length is about 24 to 28 in (61 to 71 cm). The design of the hilt is a typical hook to prevent slipping when wet.
