= Banyal =

- Type: Sword
- Place of origin: Sulu Archipelago, Philippines

Specifications
- Blade type: Single-edged, straight to slightly convex
- Hilt type: hardwood, metal
- Scabbard/sheath: hardwood, woven rattan

The banyal, is a short sword originating in the Moro people of Mindanao in the Philippines. It has an unusual concave shape on the blade's top part, which is very similar to the bangkung in general profile. But it is smaller with a different pommel style. The blade is thick, weighted at the front for chopping attacks and had a single edge.

== See also ==
- Kampilan
- Weapons of Moroland
