= Gayang =

Ethnic Moro weapon

Gayang is a common traditional Filipino ethnic Moro weapon in Sulu archipelago. It is a double-edged sword about 24–48 in (61–122 cm) in length with a typical hook hilt grip to prevent slipping. The sword was believed to be from Borneo and was a Philippines' version of Mandau, a traditional sword of the Dayaks of Borneo.
