= Laring =

- Type: Sword
- Place of origin: Philippines

Service history
- Used by: Moro people

Specifications
- Length: 24–48 in (61–122 cm)
- Blade type: Single edge, pronged tip
- Hilt type: wood
- Scabbard/sheath: wood

Laring is one of the traditional ethnic Moro weapons of Southern Philippines. It has a lightweight design for slashing and thrusting. It has a two pronged tip like a blade catcher that looks like a snake's tongue. The blade guard has a small round steel for firmer hold and mobility. The handle end has a unique hooked hilt grip design that serves as a counter weight for better handling and balance and to prevent the sword from slippage when pulling out when stuck in a target.

The open type scabbard is made of kalantas wood, a type of Philippine mahogany which allows for quick drawing. The length is about 24–48 in (61–122 cm).
