= Susuwat =

Ethnic Moro weapon

Susuwat is a traditional Filipino ethnic Moro weapon. It is light and devastating used by the indigenous people of Mindanao. It is a single blade with a wide tipped and a triple prong designed for forward cutting. The sword is about 24–48 in (61–122 cm) in length with a hooked grip to prevent slipping when wet.
