= Panabas =

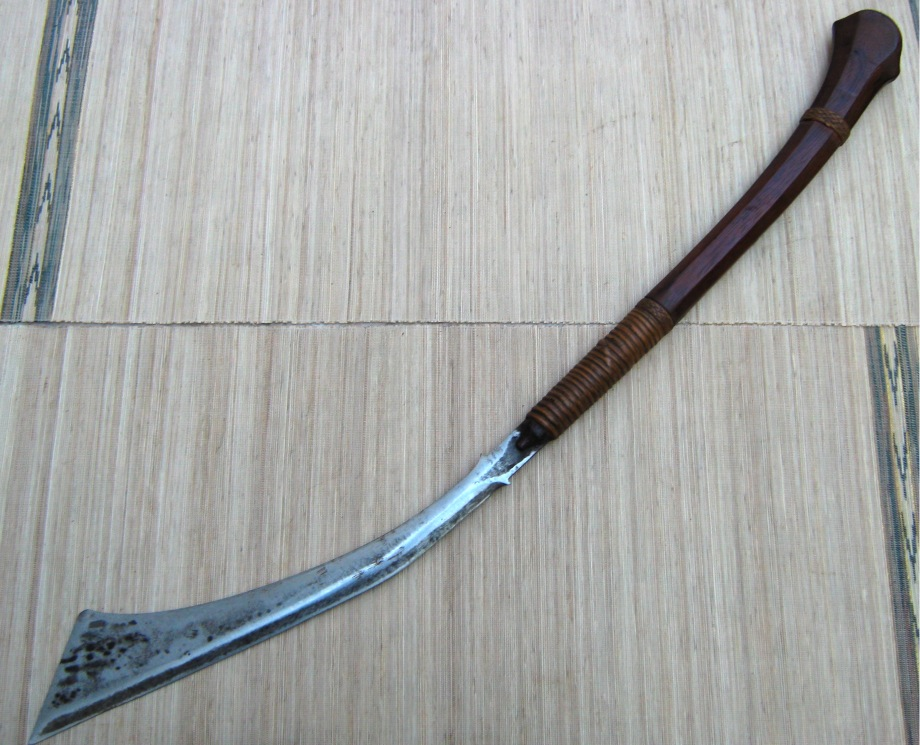
- A Moro panabas
- Type: Sword, Battle axe
- Place of origin: Philippines

Specifications
- Length: 24–48 in (61–122 cm)
- Blade type: Single-edged, curved bladed, blunt or pointed tipped

The panabas is a chopping bladed weapon or tool from the Philippines, variously described as both a sword and a battle axe. It has a distinctive long straight haft and a curving blade of various designs. It can range in size from 2 to 4 feet (61 to 122 cm) and can be held with one or both hands, delivering a deep, meat cleaver-like cut.

It is found throughout the islands of the Philippines as an agricultural tool for cutting branches and thickets. Variants of the panabas used as combat weapons or ceremonial executioner's axes are more commonly associated with the ethnic groups of the southern Philippines, particularly with the Maranao and Maguindanao people.

The panabas is one of many bladed weapons portrayed in the "Weapons of Moroland" plaque that has become a common souvenir item and pop culture icon in the Philippines.

== Names ==
The word panabas means "tool for cutting down", from the prefix pang- and the root word tabas. It is also known alternatively as pangtabas or simply tabas. In specific regions, it is also known as lantip in the Western Visayas (where it is primarily a sugarcane-cutting tool), palataw in Luzon, and nawi among the Maguindanao people.

"Panabas", as a broader term, can also refer to the indigenous large forward-curving sickle-scythes of the Philippines, known more specifically as the karit, haras, lagaraw, lampas, or sanggot. But they are completely different tools. A weaponized version of the agricultural sickle would be the Indonesian kerambit.

Panabas can also be referred to with generic names for large bolos like talibong (also the name of an unrelated Visayan sword) or badang.

== Appearance ==
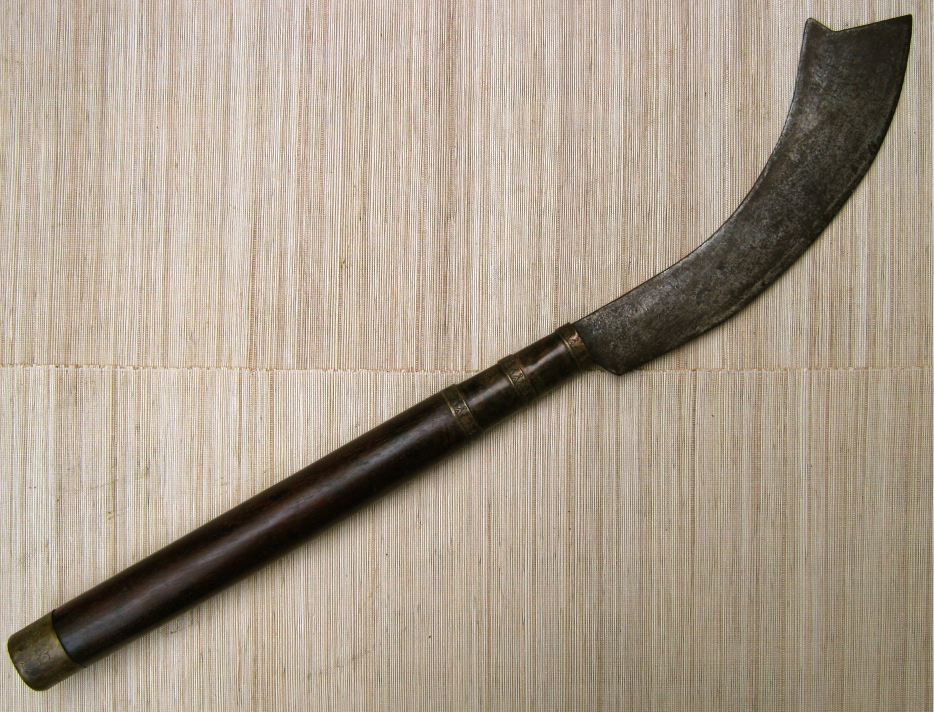
A Lumad panabas. Overall length of this example is 62 cm (24 in).

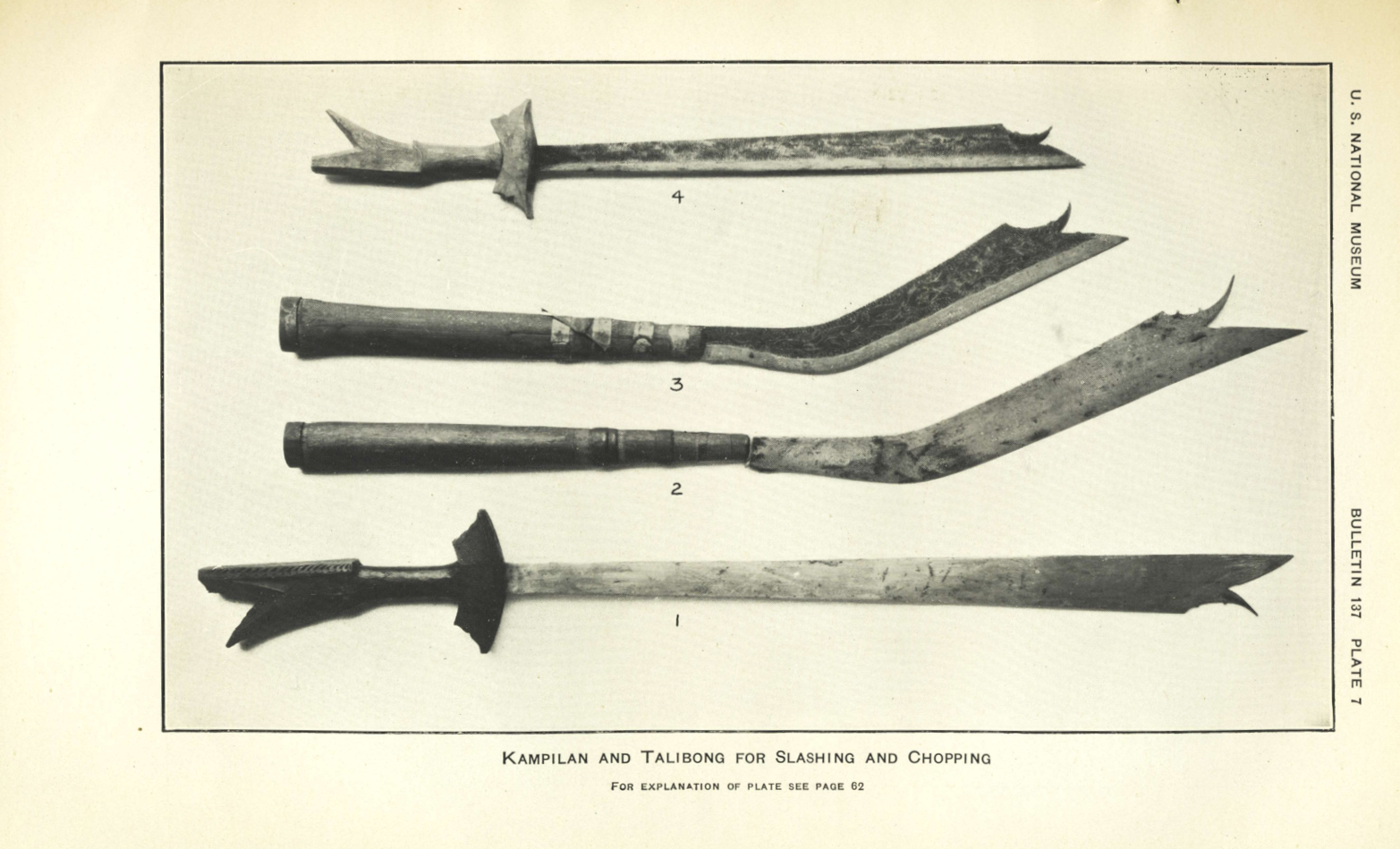
Bagobo (2) and Maranao (3) panabas with decorative spikes, labeled as "talibong" and primarily used for agricultural work. The top and bottom swords (1 and 4) are Maranao kampilan swords which can reach similar large sizes. (c. 1926)

Easily one of the most recognizable among Filipino blade weapons, the panabas is distinguished by its broad and uniquely shaped blade, and its long hilt. At 2 to 4 ft (0.61 to 1.22 m) in length, it is among the largest of Filipino swords, with only some Kampilan specimens being longer.

=== Blade ===
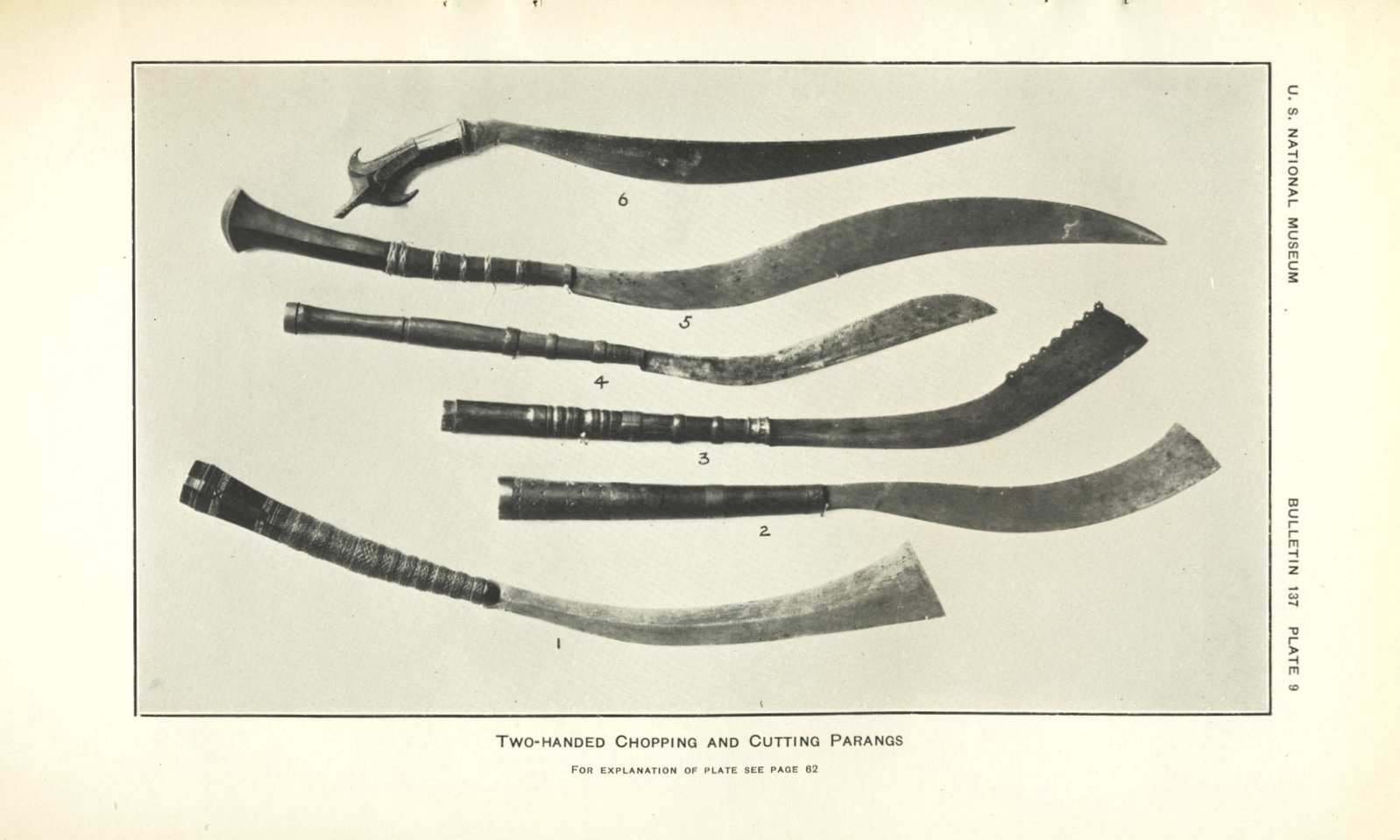
Four types of Maguindanao panabas (1 to 5), labeled as "tabas" and "talibong". 1, 3, and 4 are all ceremonially used for execution by beheading. 2 and 5 have S-shaped blades. The topmost sword (6) is a Visayan talibong. (c. 1926)

The most common forms of panabas have a laminated steel blade that is single-edged, narrowest near the haft, and gets dramatically broader towards the tip as the blade curves backwards away from the edged side, though there are some rare varieties that do have forward curved blades.

Because the panabas is primarily used in a chopping rather than thrusting motion, the shape of the actual tip varies greatly, with some specimens coming to a blunt tip, some pointed in the manner of other Filipino swords such as the Dahong Palay, and some taking on a square or diamond shape, with the furthest tip of the diamond, on the tip of the edge. There are rare panabas specimens that have an S-shaped blade sharpened partially along the backside, such that the specimen is double edged at the tip.

While design work on the panabas's blade is relatively rare, among the most common examples of decorative design elements take the form of decorative piercings/serrations along a small section on the furthest end of the spine, and/or a talismanic 'X' along the spine.

Observed cross-sectionally, the blade is also thicker at its base, with a typical example being about 2 cm (0.79 in) thick - so designed in order to withstand the massive forces that the panabas both deals out and absorbs with every blow.

=== Haft ===
The panabas' haft, made of hardwood such as narra and often wrapped in braided rattan, is perhaps the longest among Filipino swords, both in terms of overall length, and in terms of proportion relative to the blade. The hafts of some specimens are wrapped in metal bands rather than rattan. The haft has no guards.

=== Scabbard ===
Panabas scabbards were made of plain wood and are now extremely rare - according to accounts, largely because warriors would frequently discard them prior to a battle. Such scabbards invariably consist of two pieces of wood which are taken apart to remove the sword, as opposed to the sheath-type scabbards used by most other swords. The weapons are also said to have been carried into battle wrapped in cloth and slung across the back.

== Usage ==
=== Weapon ===
While the panabas is now rare and there are thus no contemporary cases of its use in battle, stories from and prior to the American colonial era describe it as being used for mop-up operations. It is said that warriors wielding panabas would form a rear guard and, following in the steps of warriors in front, use the panabas to quickly dispatch any survivors.

=== Execution tool ===
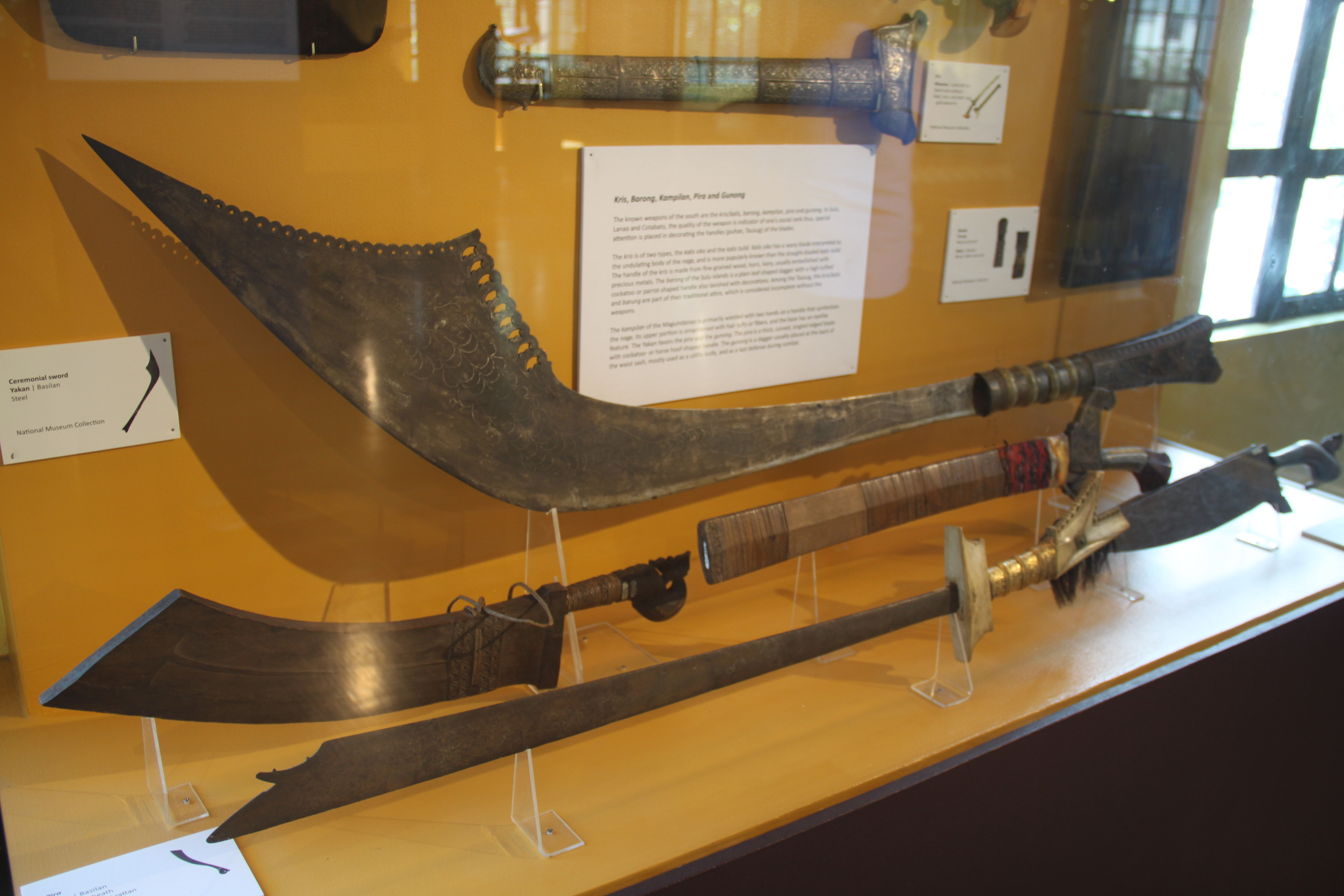
A very large ceremonial Yakan panabas

Because of its effectiveness at chopping through meat, panabas was known favored for use in executions. As such, the panabas also came to symbolize a datu's power - a demonstration of his ability to control violence.

=== Domestic use ===
The function of the panabas is that of a large cleaver, and this shapes the domestic use of the panabas as much as it shapes the martial use. The noted use of the panabas as an execution tool sprang from its initial domestic use for cleaving meat and fish, easily chopping through the large tuna that are caught in the seas of the Southern Philippines. However, its main domestic use is that of clearing dense vegetation.

== See also ==
- Head axe
- Kampilan
- Kerambit
- Celurit
- Weapons of Moroland
- Filipino Martial Arts
