= Utak =

- Type: Sword
- Place of origin: Philippines

Service history
- Used by: Moro people

Specifications
- Length: 24–48 in (61–122 cm)
- Blade type: Single edge
- Hilt type: wood
- Scabbard/sheath: wood

Utak is a traditional Filipino ethnic Moro weapon in the Sulu Archipelago. It is a sword with a wide tip designed for cutting forward and is a one-handed weapon meant for chopping. The sword is about 24–48 in (61–122 cm) in length with a hooked grip to prevent slipping when wet.
