= Kampilan =

Kampilan ᜃᜋ᜔ᜉᜒᜎᜈ᜔
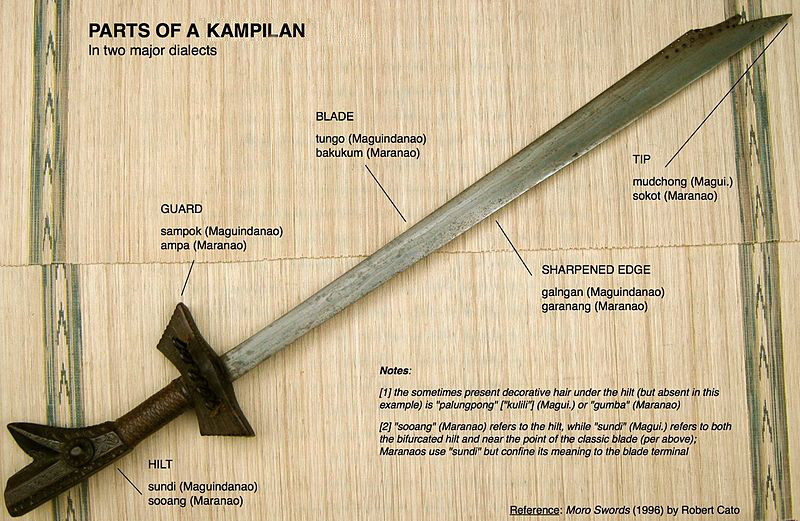
- Parts of a kampílan, written in Maguindanao and Maranao languages of Mindanao.
- Type: Sword
- Place of origin: Philippines

Service history
- In service: Precolonial barangays, Caboloan, Rajahnate of Cebu, Madja-as, Tondo, Namayan, Maynila, Ma-i, Rajahnate of Butuan, Sultanate of Maguindanao, Sultanates of Lanao, Sultanate of Sulu and Sultanate of Brunei
- Used by: Kapampangans, Ilocanos, Totoon Pangasinan, Tagalogs, Bicolanos, Visayans, Lumad, Moros (Iranun, Maguindanao, Maranao, Tausug), Bajau
- Wars: Battle of Mactan; Spanish Conquest; Moro wars

Specifications
- Mass: 0.85–1.3 kg (1.9–2.9 lb)
- Length: 90–100 cm (35–39 in)
- Blade length: 70 cm (28 in)
- Blade type: Laminated steel blade; tapered, single-edge
- Hilt type: One-handed cruciform, with carved bifurcated pommel; Hardwood, Horn, Bone, Metal (Gold, Silver, Brass)
- Scabbard/sheath: Rattan or fibre-lashed Wood or Bamboo

The kampilan (Baybayin: ᜃᜋ᜔ᜉᜒᜎᜈ᜔) is a type of single-edged sword, (also known as talong) traditionally used by various ethnic groups in the Philippine archipelago, Kalimantan and Sulawesi. It has a distinct profile, with the tapered blade being much broader and thinner at the point than at its base, sometimes with a protruding spikelet along the flat side of the tip. It is a long sword usually held in both hands. The design of the pommel varies between ethnic groups, but it usually depicts either a buaya (crocodile), a bakunawa (sea serpent), a kalaw (hornbill), or a kakatua (cockatoo)..

This weapon was featured in the American bladesmithing competition, Forged in Fire, in season 4 episode 16.

== Names ==
"Kampilan" is the term most commonly used for the sword in the Tagalog, Ilocano and Visayan languages. It simply means "sword". It is known by other names in other ethnic groups in the Philippines including Kapampangan talibong or talibon (not to be confused with the Visayan talibon); Maranao kifing; Iranun parang kampilan; and Tboli tok and kafilan.

== History ==
Kampilan are mentioned in ancient Filipino epics, including the Hiligaynon Hinilawod from the Visayas; the Ilocano Biag ni Lam-Ang from Luzon; and the Maranao Darangen of Mindanao. The kampilan also plays a central part in the Maranao and Maguindanao traditional war dance of Sagayan, which depicts a scene from the Darangen.

Unlike other common precolonial Filipino bolo weapons which were based on agricultural implements, the kampilan is specifically made for warfare, used either in small skirmishes or large-scale encounters. According to Philippine historical documents, the kampílan was widely used by chieftains and warriors for battle and as a headhunting sword. The most famous probable use of kampilan in warfare was in the Battle of Mactan, where Antonio Pigafetta described Ferdinand Magellan being wounded on the left leg by a warrior bearing "a large cutlass, which resembles a scimitar, only being larger." In traditional societies of the Tagalog people, it is also used as a form of religious adornment in a dambana. Kampilan swords only survive into modern times among the Moro and the Lumad people, due to the longer period that they avoided Spanish colonization.

== Physical description ==
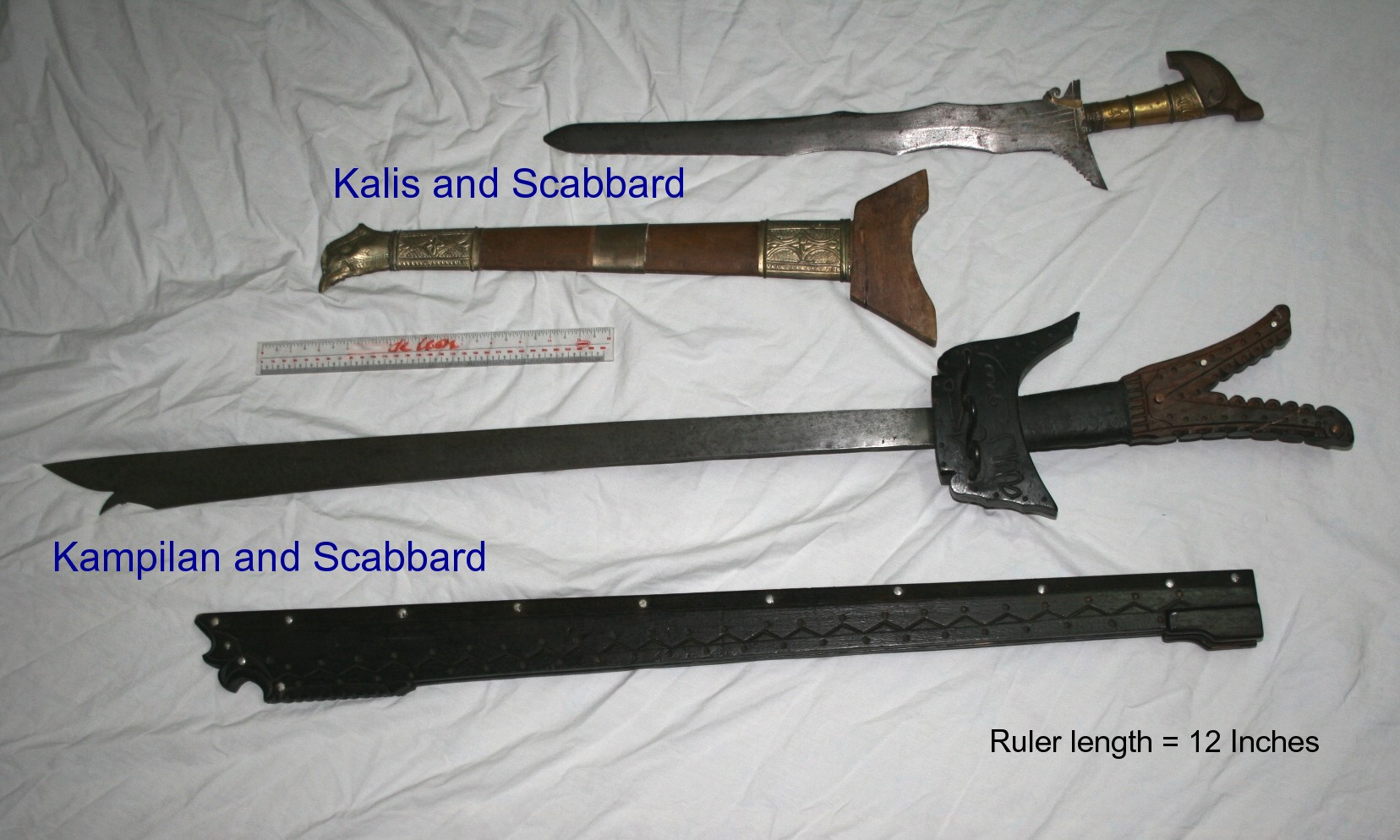
A kampilan with a crocodile pommel shown with the shorter kalis for comparison. The sheaths are also displayed.

Among Filipino swords, the most distinguishing characteristic of the kampilan is its huge size. At about 36 to 40 inches (90 to 100 cm) long, it is much larger than other Filipino swords, and is thought to be the longest, though smaller versions (sometimes called the "kampilan bolo") exist. A notable exception would be the panabas, another Philippine longsword, of which unusually large examples used for ceremonial execution purposes could measure up to four feet in length. The blade is narrow near the hilt and it gradually swells in width into an almost trapezoidal profile at the end. The blades are often laminated with various styles of tip. Kampílan blades often have holes near the tip that are sometimes filled with brass. Rarer still are specimens that have tips exhibiting a kris-like fretwork, while others have engravings down the entire blade. Although the kampílan can be used with one hand, it is primarily a one-handed sword.

=== Blade ===
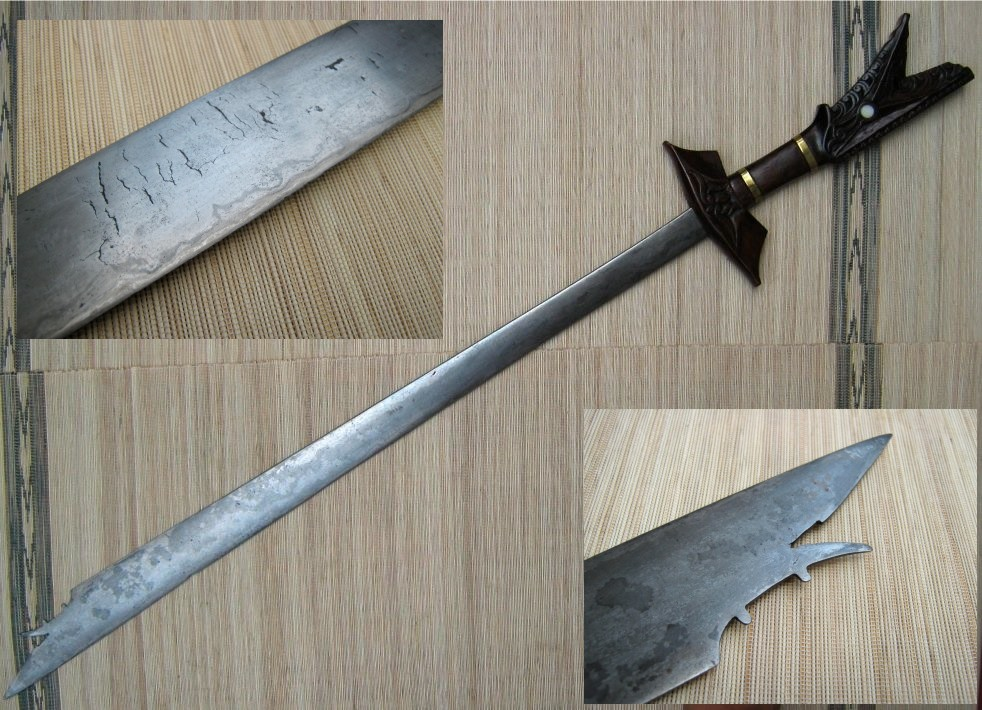
The lamination (pattern welding) of the blade of this kampílan is clearly visible. A close-up view of the characteristic spikelet on the blade's tip is also shown.

The laminated steel blade of the kampílan is single-edged, and made by the Damascus steel pattern welding process. It is easily identified by its tapered profile, narrowest near the hilt and gently widening until its truncated point. The blade's spikelet has led to the description of the kampílan in some documents as "dual-tipped" or "double-tipped".

=== Sheath or scabbard ===
The scabbard is usually made of cheap wood and is bound with simple rattan or fibre lashings. When the sword needs to be used immediately, the sword bearer will simply strike with the sheathed sword and the blade will cut through the lashings, thereby effecting a quick, tactical strike without the need to unsheathe the sword.

Scabbards are unadorned and are often disposable when going into battle. Some scabbards were also made of bamboo or were made with a handle that allowed half of the scabbard to serve as a small shield.

=== Hilt ===
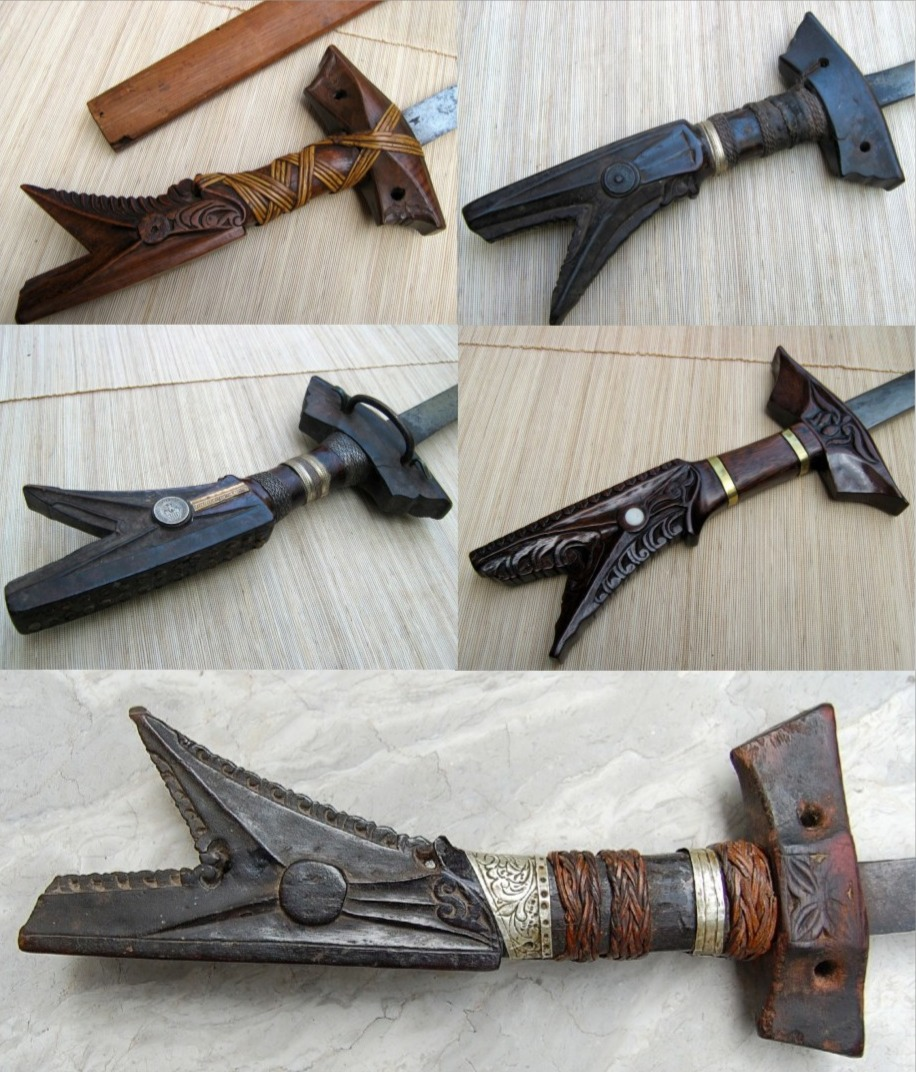
Detail of the hilts of Moro kampílan, which typically have kalaw (hornbill) pommel designs.

The hilt is quite long in order to counterbalance the weight and length of the blade and is made of hardwood. As with the blade, the design of the hilt's profile is relatively consistent from blade to blade. The hilt is sometimes wrapped with rattan to improve the grip. At times the hilt was bound to the hand by a talismanic piece of cloth to prevent slippage. Sometimes a chain mail covering was attached to prevent the hand from injury. Almost all kampílan originally had large metal staples protruding from the cross guard above the grip.

The complete tang of the kampílan disappears into a crossguard, which is often decoratively carved with geometric or flowing patterns. The guard prevents the enemy's weapon from sliding all the way down the blade onto bearer's hand and also prevents the bearer's hand from sliding onto the blade while thrusting.

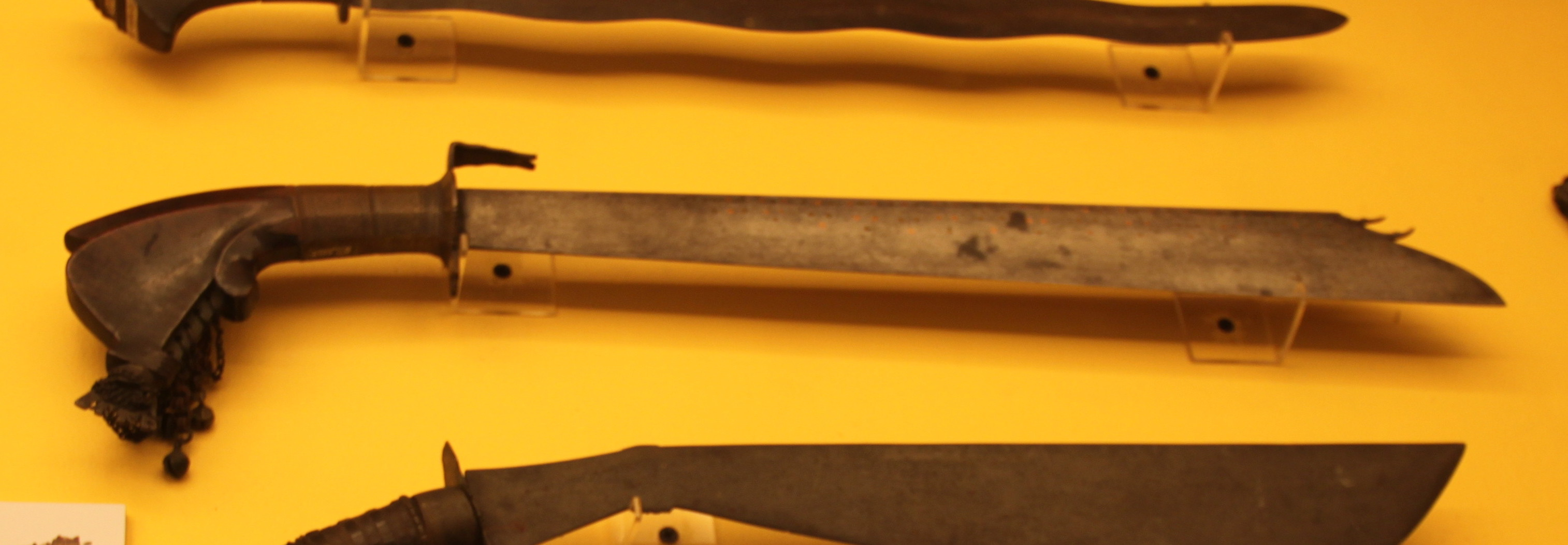
A Bagobo kampilan from Mindanao.

The most distinctive design element of the hilt is the pommel. The design of the pommel varies between ethnic groups of the Philippines. In the ethnic groups of Visayas and Luzon, the pommel usually depicts a bakunawa (or naga), a horned dragon-like mythological creature. Among the Muslim Moro people, the pommel usually depicts either a kalaw (hornbill) or a kakatua (cockatoo). Other animals depicted in kampilan pommels include monitor lizards and crocodiles. Among the Lumad people of the interiors of Mindanao, kampilan pommels do not typically depict animals, but is instead a simple curving shape that flares out at the end.

Kampilan hilts are typically made from hardwood, but expensive examples that belonged to datu are covered in silver sheet or are entirely manufactured out of expensive materials such as horn or bone. Like the blade, they may possess small holes at the tips and edges which can have attachments like bells, metal chains, or animal or human hair tassels. Some kampilan hilts, especially among the Lumad, can also be made entirely of brass.

== Similar swords ==
Similar weapons to the kampilan in the Philippines include the Bangkung, Laring, Itak, Pirah, and the Banyal. Other similar weapons to the Kampilan outside of the Philippines include the Dayak Mandau of Borneo; the Minahasan santi of northern Sulawesi; and the Sangirese Bara Sangihe of the Sangihe Islands. In Brunei, the officers who bear the royal regalia of the Sultan of Brunei such as the Panglima Asgar (Soldier General) who carry the royal weapons of kalasak and kampilan, where as the Panglima Diraja (Royal commander) carry the Pemuras and Karga.

== Historical accounts ==
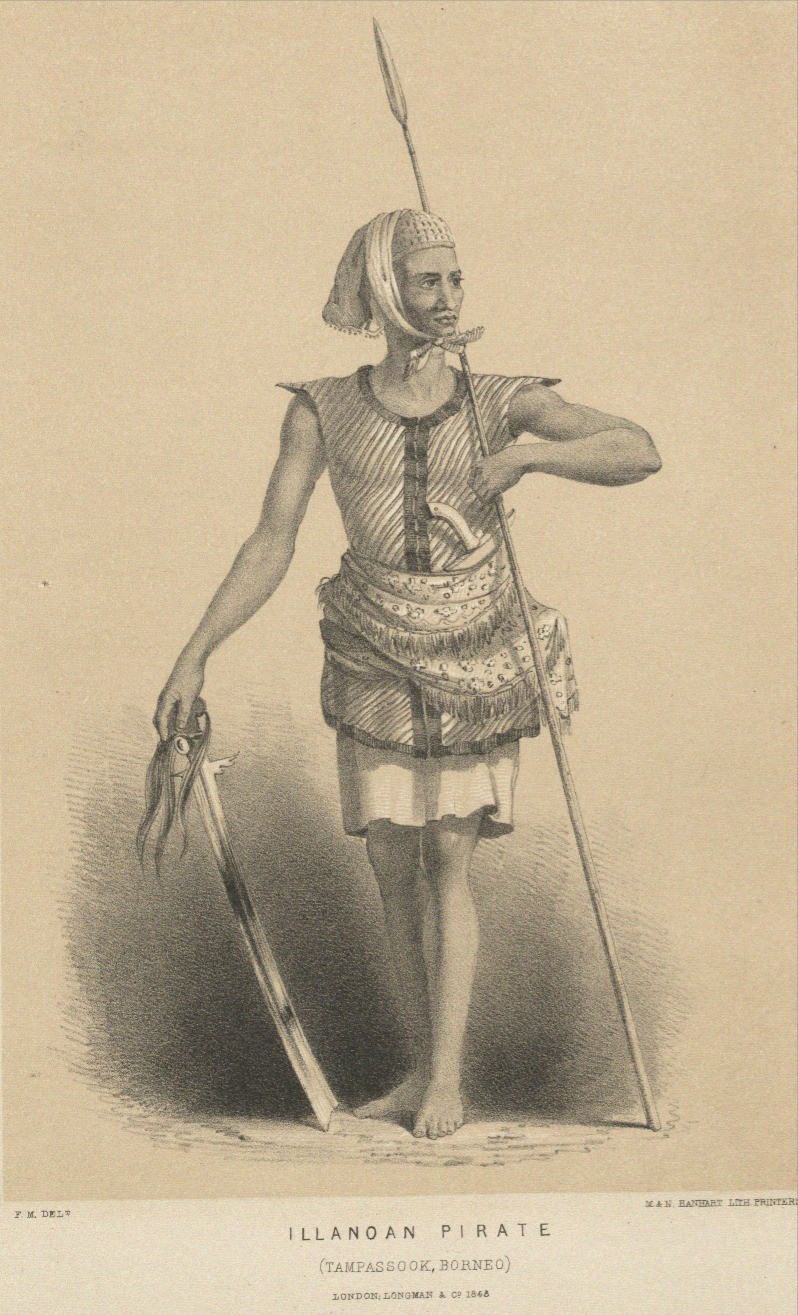
An Iranun pirate from Sabah armed with a kampilan, alongside a gunong dagger and a budjak spear.

The Mindanaos use a weapon quite distinct from that of the Ternatans. It is a campilan or cutlass of one edge, and heavier than the pointless Turkish weapon. It is a very bloody weapon, but, being so heavy, it is a danger for him who handles it, if he is not adroit with it. It has only two forms of use, namely, to wield it by one edge, and to raise it by the other, in order to deal another stroke, its weight allowing time for the spears of the opponents to enter. They do not gird it on, as that would be too much trouble, but carry it on the shoulders, in the fashion of the camarlengos who carry the rapiers on their shoulders in public ceremonies in front of their princes. Besides that weapon the Mindanao uses lance, kris, and shield, as do the other nations. Both these and those have begun to use firearms too much, having acquired that from intercourse with our enemies. They manage all sorts of artillery excellently, and in their fleets all their craft carry their own pieces, with ladle, culverins, esmerils, and other small weapons.

— Fr. Francisco Combes, History of Mindanao, Sulu and Adjacent Islands (1667)

== Modern day ceremonial uses ==
The No. 1 graduating cadet of the Philippine National Police Academy will receive the Presidential Kampilan as a recognition of his achievement for excelling in all aspects of the 4-year cadetship training, the No. 2 graduate will also receive the Vice Presidential Kampilan as recognition for the 2nd best performing cadet of the graduating batch.

== See also ==
- Cutlass
- Filipino Martial Arts
- Kalasag
- Kalis
- Klewang
- Kris
- Falchion
- Kampilan Division

== Publications ==
- Whittington, Jeff. "armory:knives". Peoples of the Philippines: Filipino Arts and Crafts. The C.E. Smith Museum of Anthropology. Archived from the original on July 19, 2011.
- Greaves, Ian; Jose Albovias Jr; Federico Malibago. "Sandata - The Edged Weapons of the Philippines". History of Steel in Eastern Asia. Macao Museum of Art. Archived from the original on August 10, 2015.
- "kampilan (subheading)". History of Steel in Eastern Asia. Macao Museum of Art.
