= Indian sword =

Sword of India

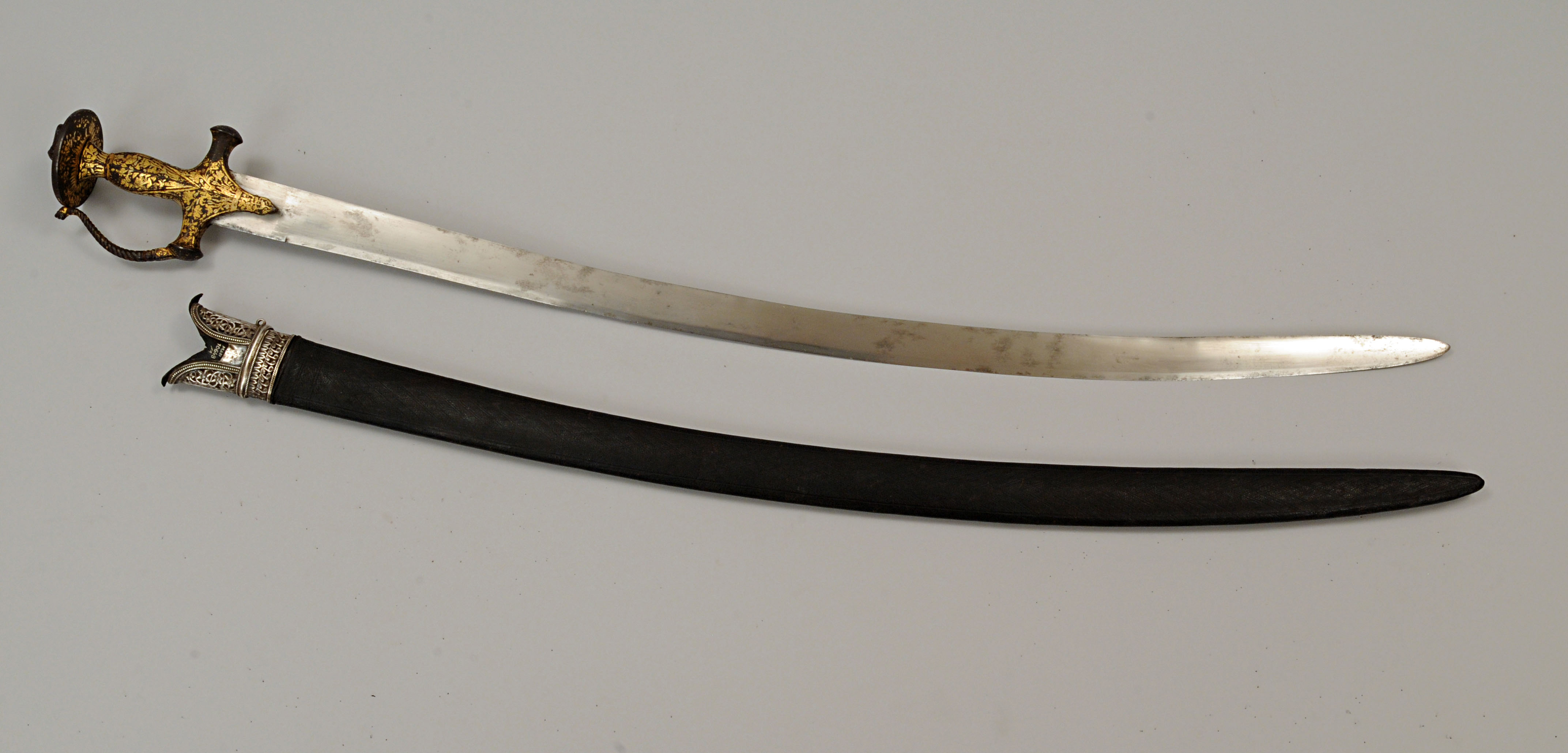
Talwar

There are a number of swords that originated in India and have seen their usage throughout the history of warfare.

== Overview ==
In the Indian subcontinent, one of the earliest available Bronze age swords of copper was discovered by the period of Indus Valley Civilization. Swords have been recovered in archaeological findings throughout the Ganges-Yamuna Doab region of Indian subcontinent, consisting of bronze but more commonly copper. Swords have been also discovered in Fatehgarh, where there are several varieties of hilt. These swords have been variously dated to times between 1700 and 1400 BC. Other swords from this period in India have been discovered from Kallur, Raichur.

In general, Indians have significantly used one-handed swords in order to carry the shield along with them. Nevertheless, there has been use of two-handed swords in India, such as by Naga people of Assam.

The Indian swords have been also used by Arabians and Europeans since medieval times.

Swords have culturally influenced the iconography and culture of India. Sikhs consider swords to be holy and the Sikh emblem (Khanda (Sikh symbol)) depicts a doubled-edged sword surrounded by a circle and two curved swords.

== List of Indian swords ==
- Aruval
- Asi
- Ayudha katti
- Bichuwa
- Dao
- Firangi
- Gupti
- Hengdang
- Katar
- Kayamkulam vaal
- Khadga
- Khanda
- Kirpan
- Kukri
- Malappuram Kathi
- Moplah sword
- Pata
- Pesh-kabz
- Pichangatti
- Sirohi sword
- Talwar
- Urumi

== See also ==
- Chinese sword
- Japanese sword
- Korean sword
