= Hengdang =

Single edged sword with long handle from India

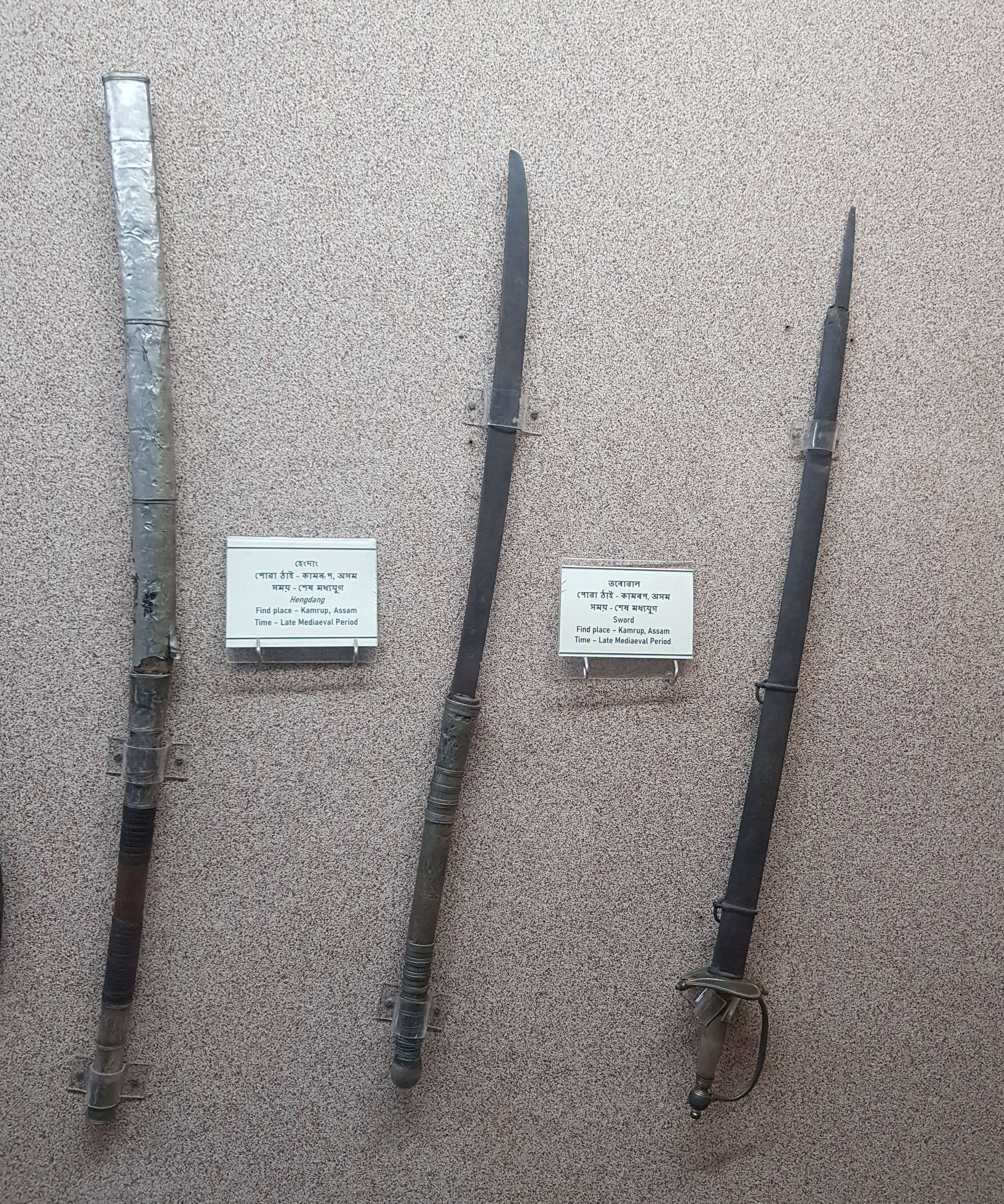
Hengdang of Ahom era

The Hengdang (Assamese: হেংদাং) is a single edged sword with a long handle used by the Ahoms in India. The handle and the scabbard were designed in gold, silver or wood according to the position of the person. It is similar in many ways to the Burmese or Thai Dha, or a samurai sword, the Katana. The hengdang was used as a special kind of sword which was used by high-ranking officials of the Ahom Kingdom like the Swargadeo (King), Premier, Prime Minister, Commander and Sub-Commander. It has ceremonial use today in the Ahom weddings.

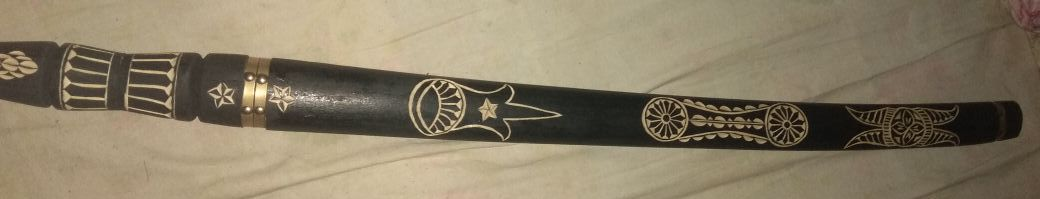
Hengdang sword

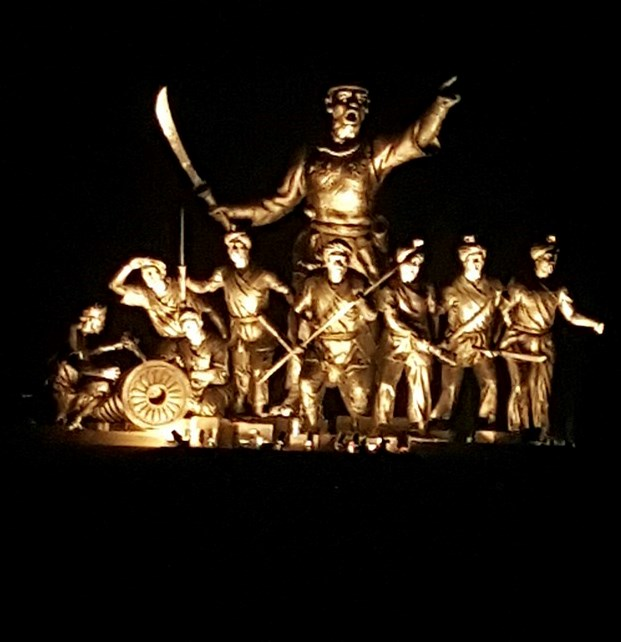
Ahom General Lachit Borphukan's statue with a Hengdang in his hand.

== See also ==
- Dha (sword) – Bughti knife
- Dao (Naga sword) – Type of sword from northeastern India
- Dao (Chinese sword) – Single-edged Chinese sword primarily used for slashing and chopping
- Chinese sword
- Turko-Mongol sabers – Type of cavalry sabre
- Korean sword – Swords produced in Korea
- Japanese sword – Type of traditionally made sword from Japan
- Indian sword – Sword of India
