= Aayudham =

Aayudham (lit. 'weapon' in Indian languages) may refer to:

- Aayudham (1982 film), a 1982 Malayalam-language film
- Aayudham (1990 film), a 1990 Telugu-language film
- Aayudham (2003 film), a 2003 Telugu-language film
- Aayudham (2005 film), a 2005 Tamil-language film
- Aayudham (2008 film), a 2008 Malayalam-language film
- Aayudham Seivom, a 2008 Tamil-language film

== See also ==
- Ayudha Puja, Hindu weapon worship
- Ayudhapurusha, weapons as personified in Hinduism
- Ayudha katti, an Indian blade weapon
- Ayudha Poojai, a 1995 Indian film
