= Boti =

South Asian cutting implement

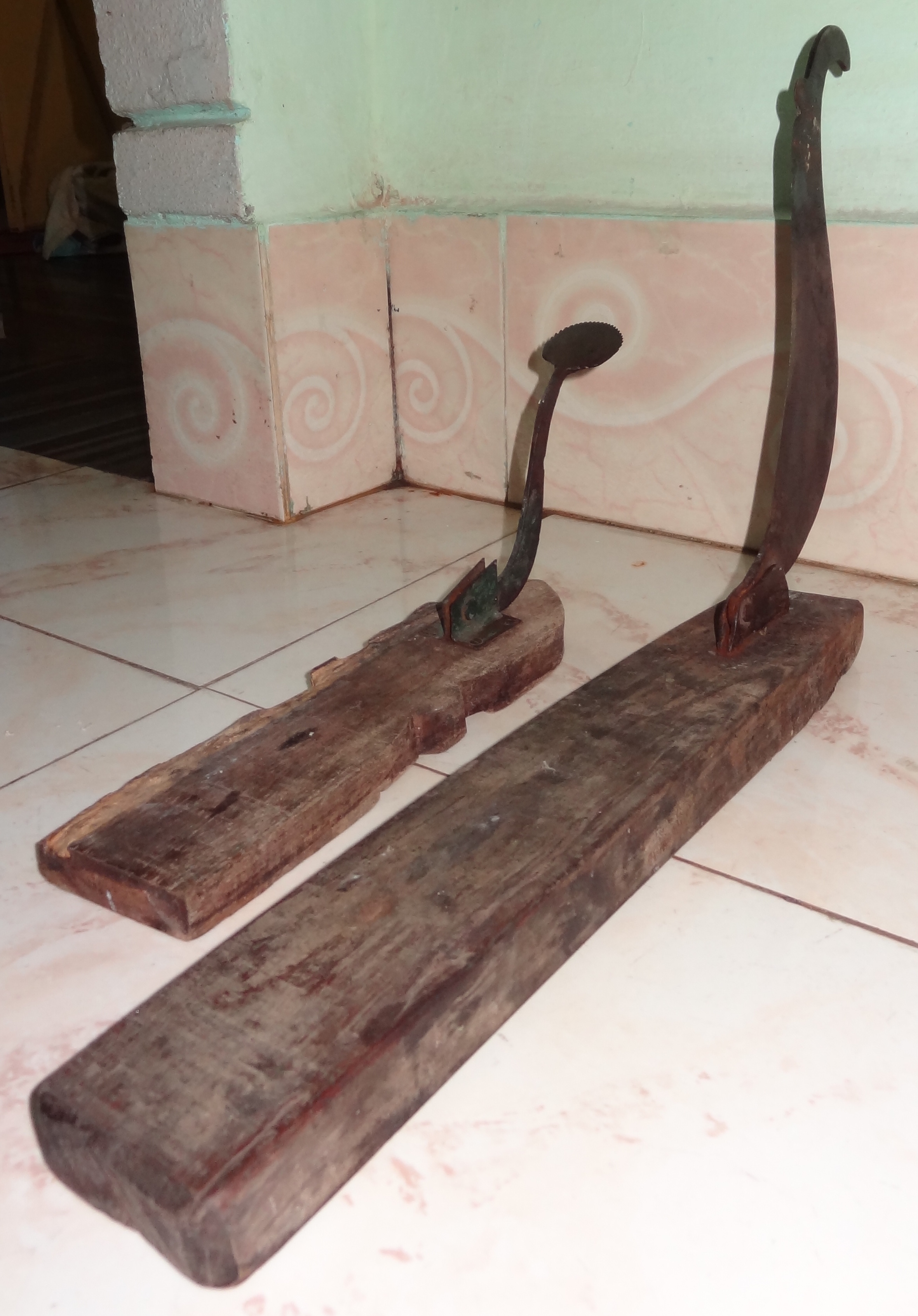
- Nariyal khuruchni (left) and regular boti (right)
- Other names: Chulesi, da, dao, hasua
- Classification: Knife
- Uses: Cutting meat, fish and vegetables
- Types: Kitchen knife

botidao also known as baithi, chulesi, botki, dao, da, aruvamanai, chulesi, pavshi, vili, morli, pahsul or pirdai is a cutting instrument, most prevalent in Nepal, Maharashtra, South India, Bihar, Pakistan and the Bengal region, Tripura, the Barak Valley of Assam.

It is a long curved blade that cuts on a platform held down by the foot. Both hands are used to hold whatever is being cut and move it against the blade. The sharper side faces the user. The method gives excellent control over the cutting process and can be used to cut anything from tiny shrimp to large pumpkins.

== Variations and names ==
A larger version of the instrument, with a bigger blade, is used for gutting and cutting fish. Another version of the instrument comprises the Nariyal Khuruchni (coconut grater) in the form of a flat round top with sharp small shark-like teeth all around it to serrate coconut. Dao or daa (one of many variants called in Bangladesh, specifically Chittagong and Sylhet) is a variation of boti, which is handheld.

The cutting instrument is not unique to Bengal. It is also used in regions throughout Indian subcontinent. It is known by different names in different languages. The names in various Indian languages or region are:

- Bengali: বটি (Boṭi), Kuruni (কুরুনি- coconut grater), Dāo/Dā (দাও/দা - hand-held)
- Bihari: बैठी (Baithi), हसवा (Haswa)
- Nepali: चुुलेेसी (Chulesi)
- Tamil: அரிவாள்மனை/அருவமனை (Arivāḷmaṇai/Aruvamaṇai), திருவி (Tiruvi - coconut grater)
- Kannada: ಈಳಿಗೆಮಣೆ (Īḷige Maṇe), ತುರಿಯುವ ಮಣೆ/ತುರಿಯಾ ಮಣೆ (Turiyuva Maṇe/Turiyā Maṇe - coconut grater)
- Malayalam: ചിരവ (Chirava)
- Telugu: కత్తిపీట (Kattipīṭa), ఈలపీట (Ēlapīṭa)
- Konkani: आदोळी (Ādoḷi)
- Marathi: मोरळी (Morḷi), विळी (Viḷi- coconut grater)
- Odia: ପନିକି / ପନିଖି (Paniki/Panikhi), କୋରଣା (Koråṇā - coconut grater)
- Maithili: হাসু/কত্তা (Hāsu/Kattā)
- Hindi: पिरदाइ (Pirdāi), पाहसुल (Pāhsul)
- Sinhala: හිරමන්‍ය (Hiramanya - coconut grater)

== Purpose ==
It is designed for the cooks to sit comfortably on the floor and cut vegetables and meat with one leg folded on the wooden base and the other leg stretched. The coconut scraper is in all states mentioned above who produce and use more coconuts in the cuisine.

== See also ==
- Dao (Naga sword)
- Dha (sword)
- Kukri
