= Ayudha =

Ayudha may refer to:

- Ayudha dynasty, former dynasty of Kannauj
- Ayudha Puja, Hindu observance
- Ayudha katti, Broad blade
- Ayudha Poojai, 1995 Indian film
- Ayudha Porattam, 2011 Indian Tamil-language film
