= Paniki =

Paniki may refer to:

- Paniki (cutting instrument), a traditional East Indian tool
- Paniki (food), a bat dish from Indonesia
- Paniki, Kursk Oblast, a rural locality in Russia

== See also ==
- Paniqui, a municipality in the Philippines
