= Krishnapuram Palace =

Palace in South kerala

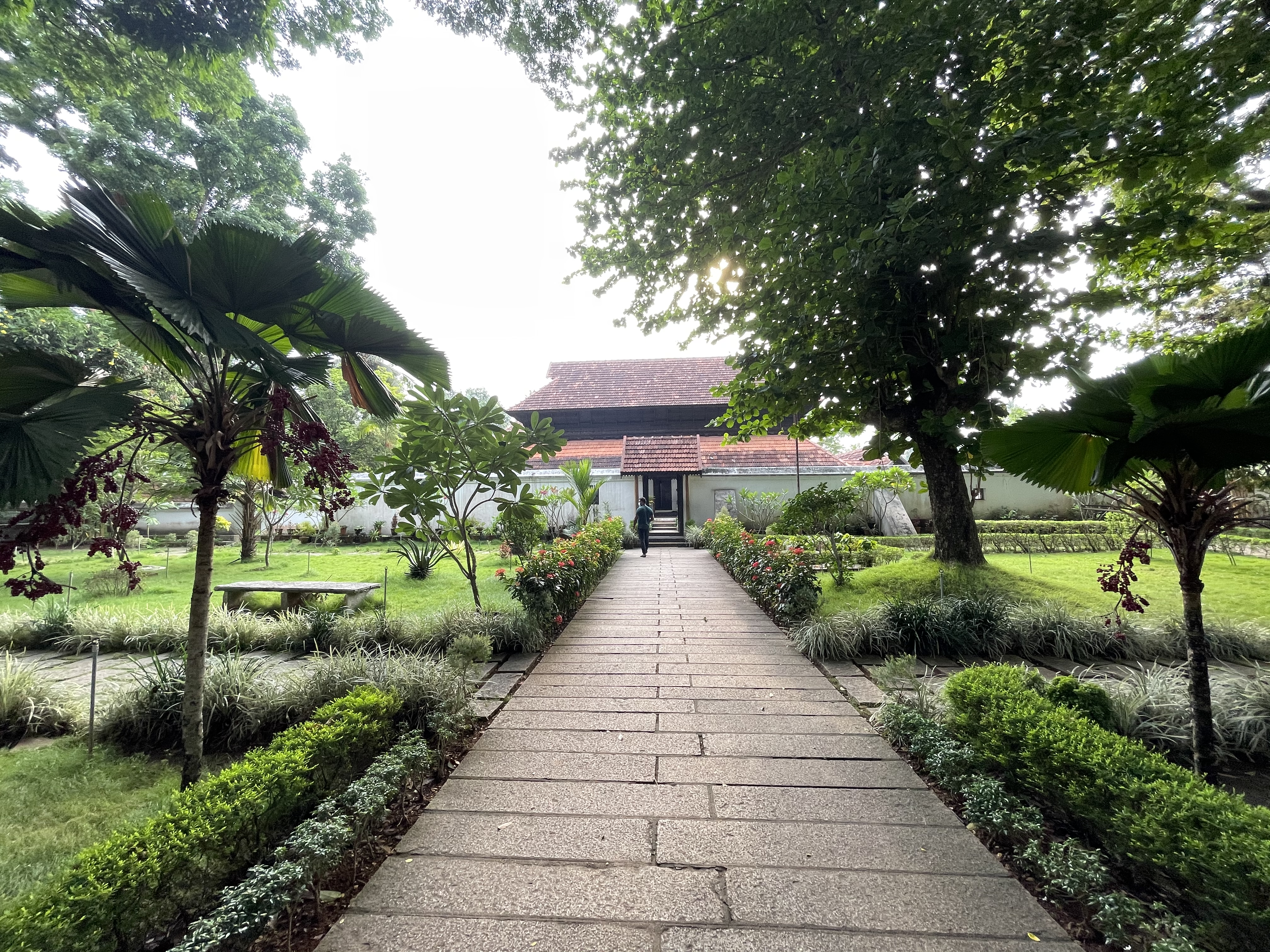
- Krishnapuram Palace in 2021, front

- Location within Kerala

General information
- Architectural style: Pathinerakettu; Kerala Architectural style
- Location: Kayamkulam and Krishnapuram in Alappuzha district, India
- Coordinates: 9.1503°N 76.5086°E
- Construction started: 1700–1775 CE; rebuilt in the 18th century
- Completed: Recent renovation in the 1950s
- Client: Originally by Veera Ravi Varma and rebuilt in the 18th century by Anizham Thirunal Martanda Varma (1729–1758 CE) and later the Archaeology Department of the Government of Kerala

Technical details
- Structural system: Laterite stone, rubble, teak, rosewood and Angili wood
- Size: Originally 56 acres (23 ha) now 2.55 acres (1.03 ha)

Design and construction
- Engineer: Initially by Ramayyan Dalava later by Ayyappan Marthan da Pillai

The Krishnapuram Palace is a palace and museum in Kayamkulam near Alappuzha in Alappuzha district, Kerala in southwestern India. It was built in the 18th century by Anizham Thirunal Marthanda Varma (1729–1758 CE), the Travancore kingdom. It is built in the architectural style of Kerala with gabled roof, narrow corridor and dormer windows, near the Krishnaswamy Temple at Krishnapuram.

The palace is maintained by the Kerala State Department of Archaeology and contains exhibits that belonged to the Palace and its former occupant, the Travancore Maharaja Marthanda Varma. It is also famous for a large pond within the palace complex. It is also said that an underground escape route runs from the bottom of the pond as a possible escape route from enemies.

Among the many Kerala-style paintings seen in the palace, a distinctly placed mural painting is titled "Gajendra Moksham" of 154 square feet (14.3 m^{2}) size, which is said to be the largest such find in Kerala. It is placed on the western end of the ground floor of the palace.

The double edged Kayamkulam Vaal (sword) is also on display here. The palace houses, in its courtyard, one of the four statues of Buddha found in Alappuzha District.

== Geography ==
The Krishnapuram Palace named after the Krishnaswamy Temple at Krishnapuram, a serene village, is situated about 2 kilometres (1.2 mi) south of Kayamkulam town... It is situated on the top of a small hillock encircled by terraced garden with fountains, ponds and lawns. Its location is to the left of the National Highway 66 (India) (NH 66) between Ochira and Kayamkulam in the Alapuzha District. It is 47 kilometres (29 mi) away from Alleppey (Alappuzha district) on the way to Kollam.

== History ==
The palace was built by King Marthanda Varma of Travancore after defeating and annexing Odanad in the Odanad–Travancore War of 1746. Before the construction of the palace, the King demolished an earlier palace at the site, which had been built by the King Veera Ravi Varma of Odanad (reign 1700–1775 CE). Initially, a small palace of a single story, known locally as Ettukettu, was built in the traditional style with an adjacent pond, temple and urappura under the management of Prime Minister Ramayyan Dalawa, which was later enlarged by Prime Minister Ayyappan Marthanada Pillai. The palace complex has many other buildings, which are a combination of traditional and Western architecture. The present building, a three-storied structure within the complex, was renovated in the 1950s by the Archaeological Department of Kerala in modern style conforming to the scientific techniques prescribed for the protection of heritage buildings. As a protected monument, it houses the Archaeological Museum and its offices.

== Architecture ==
The Krishnapuram Palace, as one of the finest and rarest examples of a typical Keralite-style architecture, known in the local language as Pathinarukettu, is complete with gabled roofs, narrow corridors and dormer windows. It is a miniature replica of Padmanabhapuram Palace, which was the headquarters of Travancore Rajas.

The palace complex originally encompassed a total land area of 56 acres (23 ha). However, over the years, as the monarchic rule ended, the palace was completely neglected and fell to disuse, and was dilapidated. Many of the buildings surrounding the main palace of the Maharaja got demolished or destroyed and the palace complex got reduced to a mere 2.55 acres (1.03 ha) enclosed within a 10 feet (3.0 m) high compound wall. The main palace, which was run down, was rebuilt to its original state as a two storied monument by the Archaeological Department of Kerala in the 1950s. The rare documents and artefacts which were kept at other locations were brought back, restored and eventually exhibited in the palace that has been converted into a Museum.

The palace restored to its originally built plans, conforming to Vastu Shastra norms, has 16 blocks or Kettus with four Nadumuttam or open area in the centre or courtyards. The windows, doors and ventilators were placed in such a way as to ensure fresh air circulation and natural lighting in all the rooms. There are 22 rooms (which open into the shady internal courtyards) with ornamental wooden partitions with carvings. Additional openings were provided to prevent any negative effects of "Murmavedham." (Secret effects). The building is set with verandas (passages) all round to protect the outer walls getting damaged due to rains. The materials used in its construction consisted of laterite stones, rubble, teak, rosewood and Angili wood. Roofing (red-tiled gabled) is steep and tiled with Mangalore tiles, which accentuates the beauty of the structure. A special feature of the carpentry adopted in building the palace consisted of wooden hinges and locks for doors and windows, instead of metallic fittings and fixtures. The flooring consists of polished wood and also of black and red oxide-coated concrete. The steps are made of polished granite blocks. Aesthetic beauty of the palace has been further enhanced by the special designs of straight, curved and spiral staircases and sunshades.

A small stream was created to flow close to the southern vicinity of the palace which also functioned as a secret escape route in times of emergency.

An underground tank or pond that stretches to the centre of the building was part of the palace; it provided air-conditioning effect of moderate temperature in all interior rooms.

The palace compound has many Padippuras, particularly at the main entrance, which are significators of status.

== Collection ==
The palace complex, which now functions as an archaeological museum, is a treasure house of ancient paintings and inscriptions, coins, megalithic remains, artefacts made of wood, brass and stone sculptures. Some of the prominent displays in the complex are: The mural of Gajendra Moksham, Kayamkulam Val (sword), Buddha's statue of the 10th century and ceremonial utensils and many other artefacts.

=== Gajendra Moksham ===
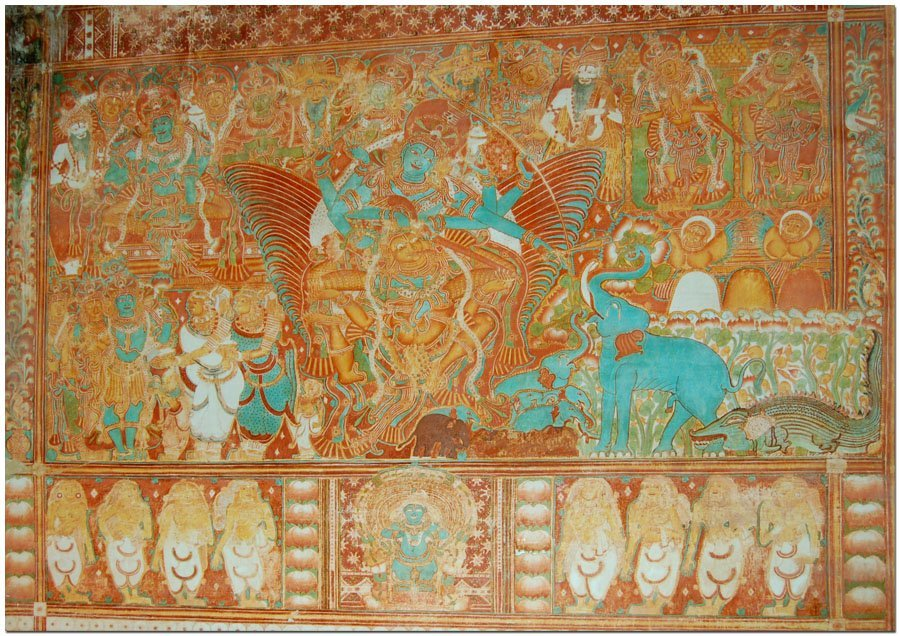
Mural of Gajendra Moksham.

Within the palace is the archaeological museum which has an exhibit of the Gajendra Moksham a 3 metres (9.8 ft) high mural, which is the largest single piece of mural painting so far discovered in Kerala. The literal meaning of 'Gajendra Moksham' is the "salvation or Moksha of the elephant king Gajendra." The theme of the mural is mythological and depicts an elephant saluting Lo Vishnu in devotion while the other minor gods, goddesses and saints look on. Vishnu was the family deity of the Kayamkulam Kings. This mural, in a fusion of colours and expressions, was placed prominently at the entrance to the palace from the pond to enable the kings to worship the deity after their daily ablutions.

The mythological legend narrated on the Gajendra Moksham (Gajendra means the King of elephants) is contained in the 10th century Sanskrit Bhagavata Purana. According to this legend, the Pandyan King Indradyumna, a devotee of Vishnu, was given a curse by Agastya, to be reborn as an elephant. Gajendra or the Elephant King, while on a pleasure trip to a lake with his wives, was seized by a crocodile that caught hold of his leg with a firm grip and thus Gajendra was held captive for many years. Finally the hapless Gajendra appealed to Vishnu, his chosen deity, to rescue him from his predicament. Vishnu made his presence soon after, riding on his Vahana (vehicle), the Garuda (the celestial half man half bird form). Garuda killed the crocodile. The entire sequence is vividly painted, with vegetable colours, on the mural with a dynamic portrayal of Garuda at the centre, about to land with "huge spread wings and a facial expression raudra (form of fury), in stark contrast to the compassionate features of the multi-armed Vishnu". The mural also shows a smaller figure of Gajendra in mid-trumpet, and of the crocodile on the right side. The mural truly represents the Kerala style of painting on every available space on it. Apart from the main characters of the legend, saints, animals, mythical beasts and forest plants are also depicted. The outer edges of the mural are decorated with Floriate borders. At the bottom, there is an exclusive "triptych-like panel which depicts Balakrishna, the child Krishna surrounded by doting females.

Kayamkulam Vaal (Sword)

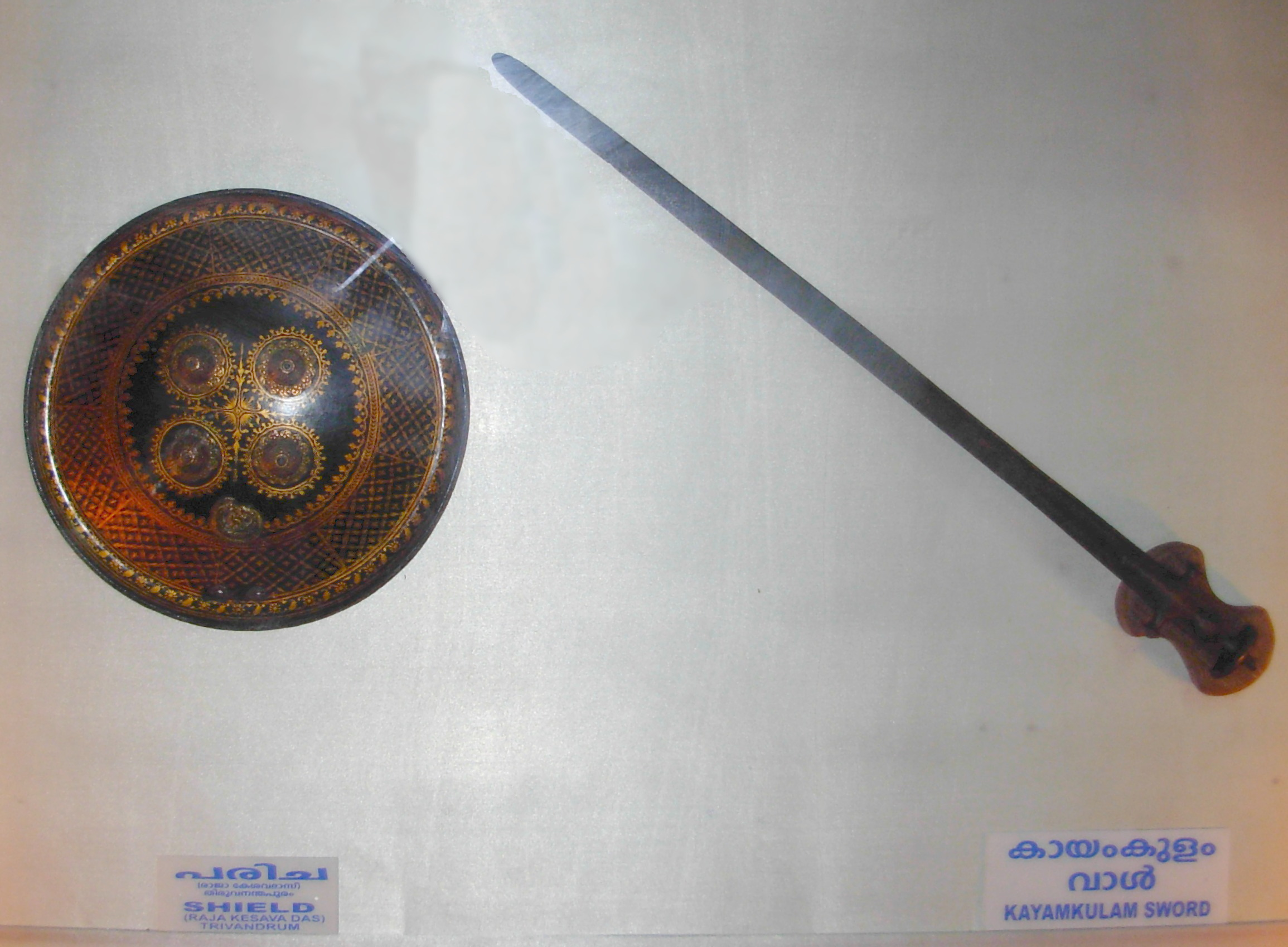
The Double edged sword – Kayamkulam Val

The Kayamkulam Vaal ('Vaal' means "sword") is an important exhibit in the museum. The significance of the sword is that its both sides are sharpened and thus it is more dangerous than any other martial weapon. It is said to have been used by the Kayamkulam Rajas in the 18th century and hence was of special attraction to the king.

=== Buddha mandapam (hall) ===
Buddha mandapam (hall) is where an attractive statue of one of the four antique Buddhas of the 10th century, which were recovered in recent times in ponds and fields in Alappuzha district is displayed. The Buddha mandapam (Buddha statue installed here predates the building of the palace) is located in the finely landscaped and tended garden with profusion of flower plants (endemic to Kerala) that surrounds the palace complex.

The four Buddha statues found in recent years in the Alappuzha district testify the prevalence of Hinayana Buddhism in Odanadu in the Maveli kingdom of Kerala several. The four Buddha images are in meditating posture with Ushnisha (cap) and Upavita (upper garment). These had been thrown into fields and ponds during the anti-Buddhism campaign in Kerala. The idol was found in a pool or tank called Puthenkula (Pond of Buddha) in Maruturkulangara in Karunagappalli. This idol, cut out of a single piece of rock, was first installed in Karunagappalli town and after many years reinstalled in the compound of Krishnapuram Palace which is now a monument in the Buddha Mantapam. This idol has a skull cap adorned with lines of pearls or diamonds that represents the highest wisdom attained by Buddha.

=== Other exhibits ===
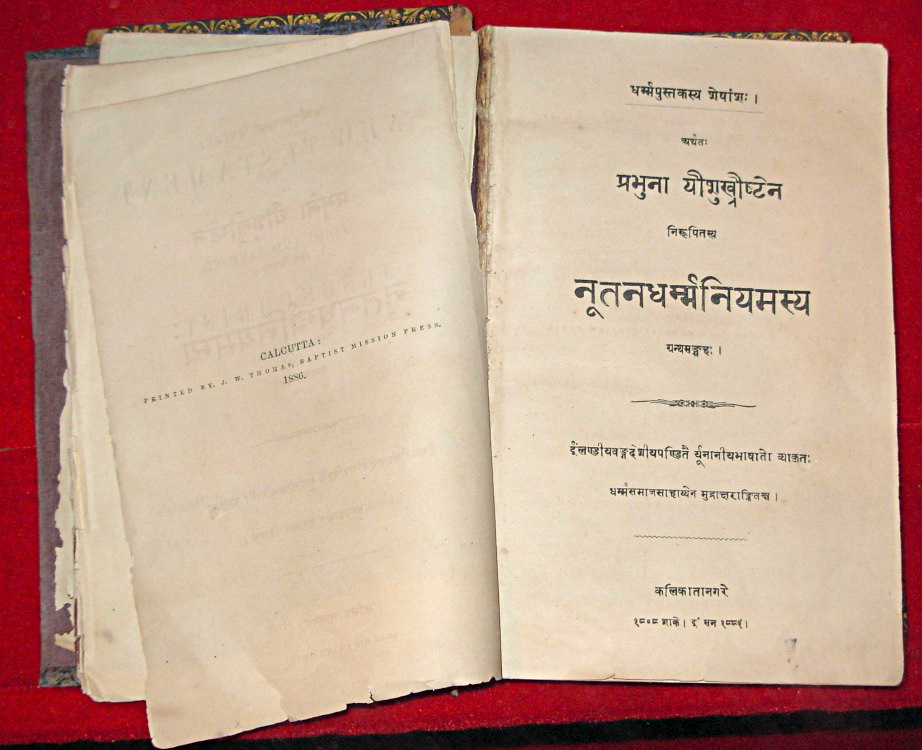
Bible in Sanskrit language printed in Calcutta (Kolkata) in 1886, kept in the Palace museum

The museum in the Krishnapuram Palace also has a copy of the Bible in Sanskrit printed in Calcutta (Kolkata) in 1886. Ceremonial utensils are also on display in a display case, which consists of oil lamps, fine miniature figures, and small stone columns carved with serpent deities (collected from various local houses). Some of these are arranged in an arc form known as prabhu and placed behind a temple deity to provide a "hallow of light". Fine miniature Panchaloha (five metals of bronze alloy with gold also as an ingredient) figures on display are of the Varuna (water god), many Vishnus and a minuscule devotee in worship mode.

== Postal Service ==
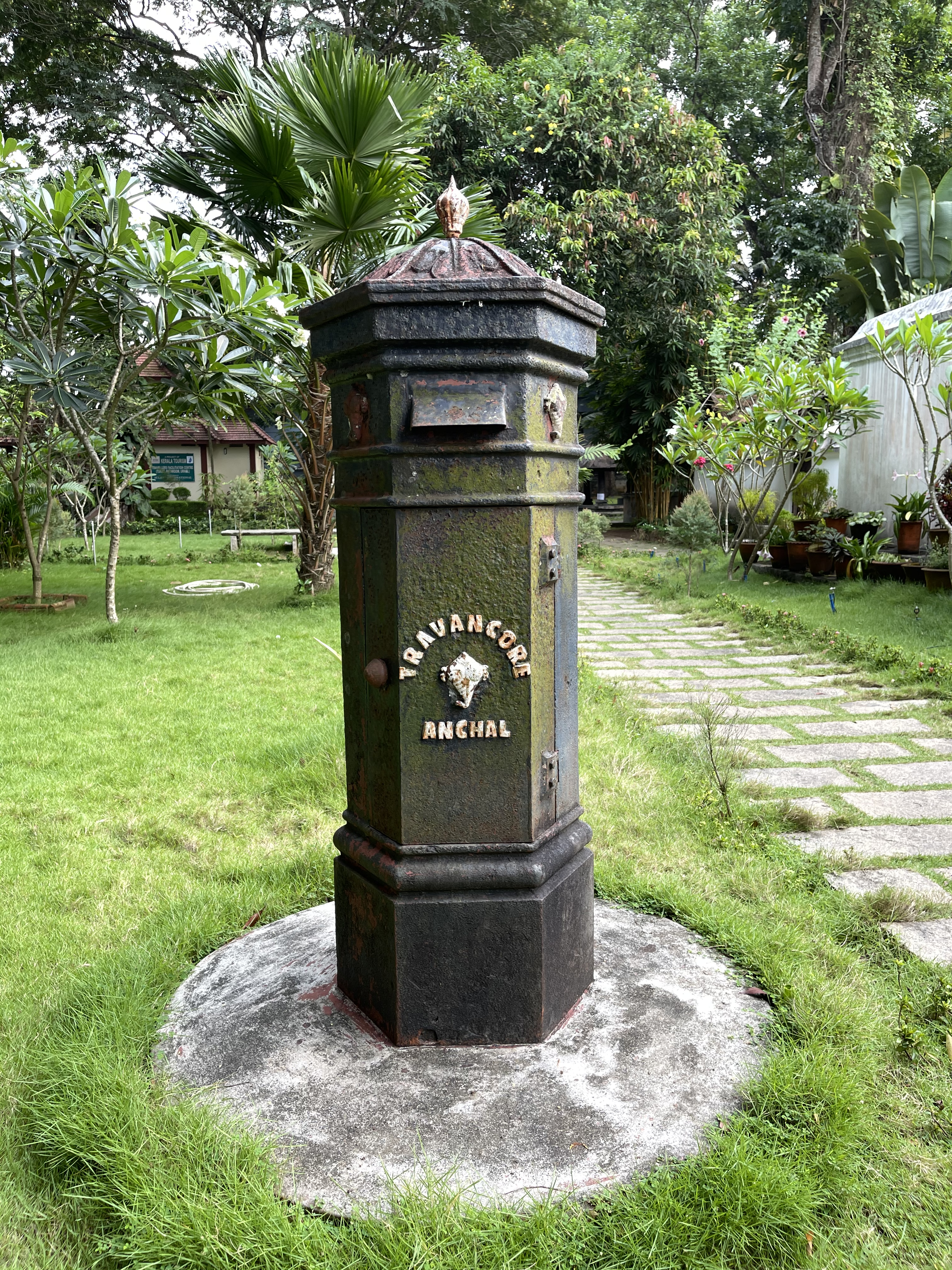
Anchal Post box at Krishnapuram Palace.

Anchal Post was the postal service of Krishnapuram Palace. It was the early postal service started in the kingdom of Travancore and Cochin before Independence of India. It was started in Travancore in 1729 by Anizham thirunal Marthandavarma and later in Cochin in 1770s.

== Gallery ==
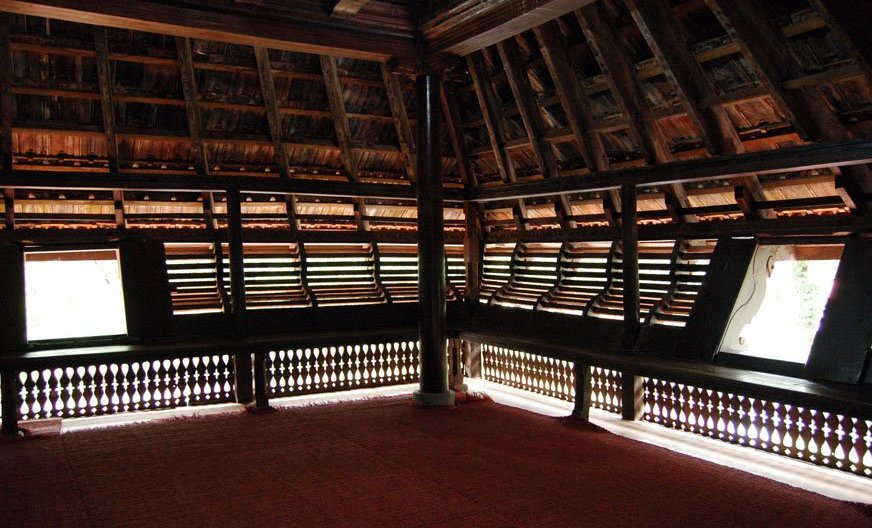
The Durbar Hall in the palace

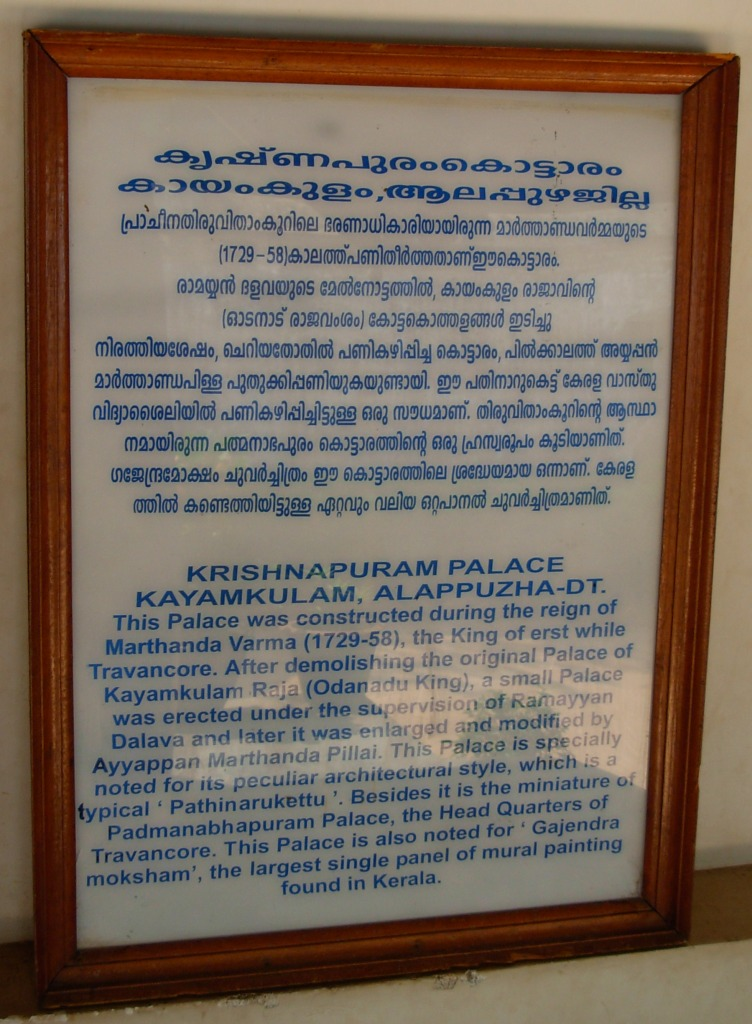
Plaque at the Krishnapuram Palace Complex

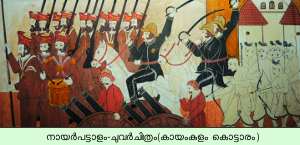
Nair soldiers with European army – A wall-painting at Krishnapuram Palace

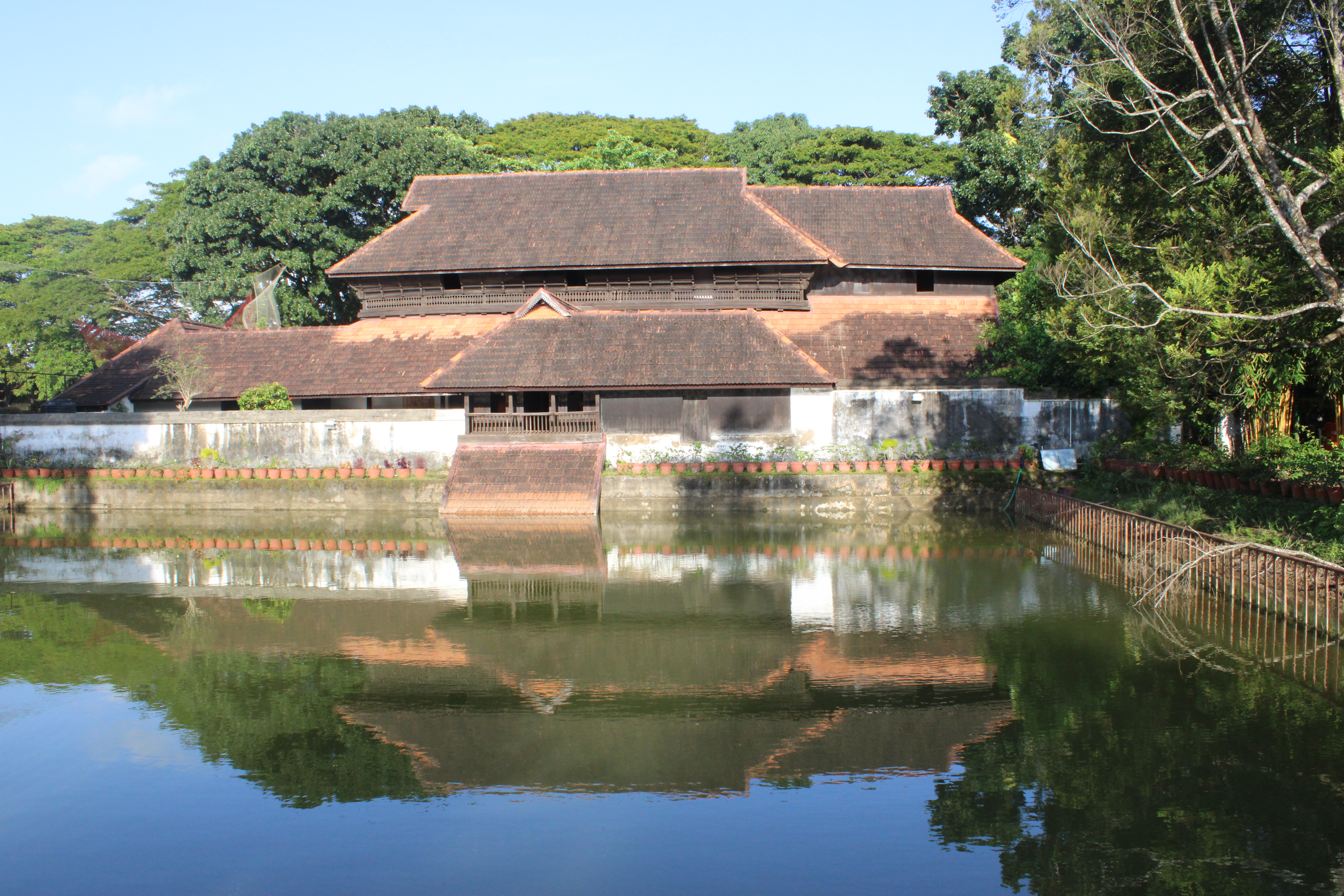
The backside of the Krishnapuram palace, with the pond in its foreground.

== See also ==
- Architecture of Kerala
- Tourism in Kerala
- Padmanabhapuram Palace
- Kowdiar Palace
- Kuthira Malika
- Eraniel Palace
