= Vethalan Kavu Mahadeva Temple =

Hindu temple in Kerala, India

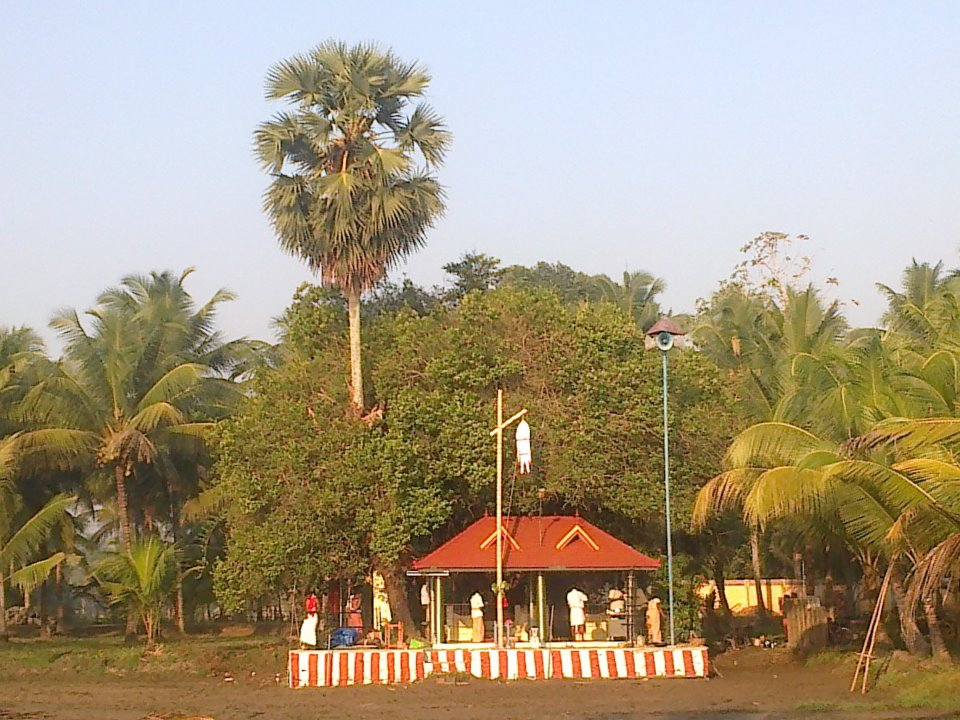

Religion
- Affiliation: Hinduism

Location
- Location: Kappil East, Krishnapuram, Kayamkulam
- Interactive map of Vethalan Kavu Mahadeva Temple

Vethalan Kavu Mahadeva Temple (Malayalam: വേതാളൻ കാവ് മഹാദേവ ക്ഷേത്രം) is located at budhanoor near chengannur alappuzha District, Kerala. It is one of the rarest temples in the world where Lord Siva is worshiped as Vethala. It is about 31 km east of the famous Oachira Parabrahma temple.

== Important festivals ==
- Festival is celebrated on the last Friday of Malayalam month Makaram (in February).
- Sivarathri
- Vishu

== See also ==
- Temples of Kerala
- Temple festivals of Kerala
