= Krishnapuram, Alappuzha district =

Krishnapuram
- village
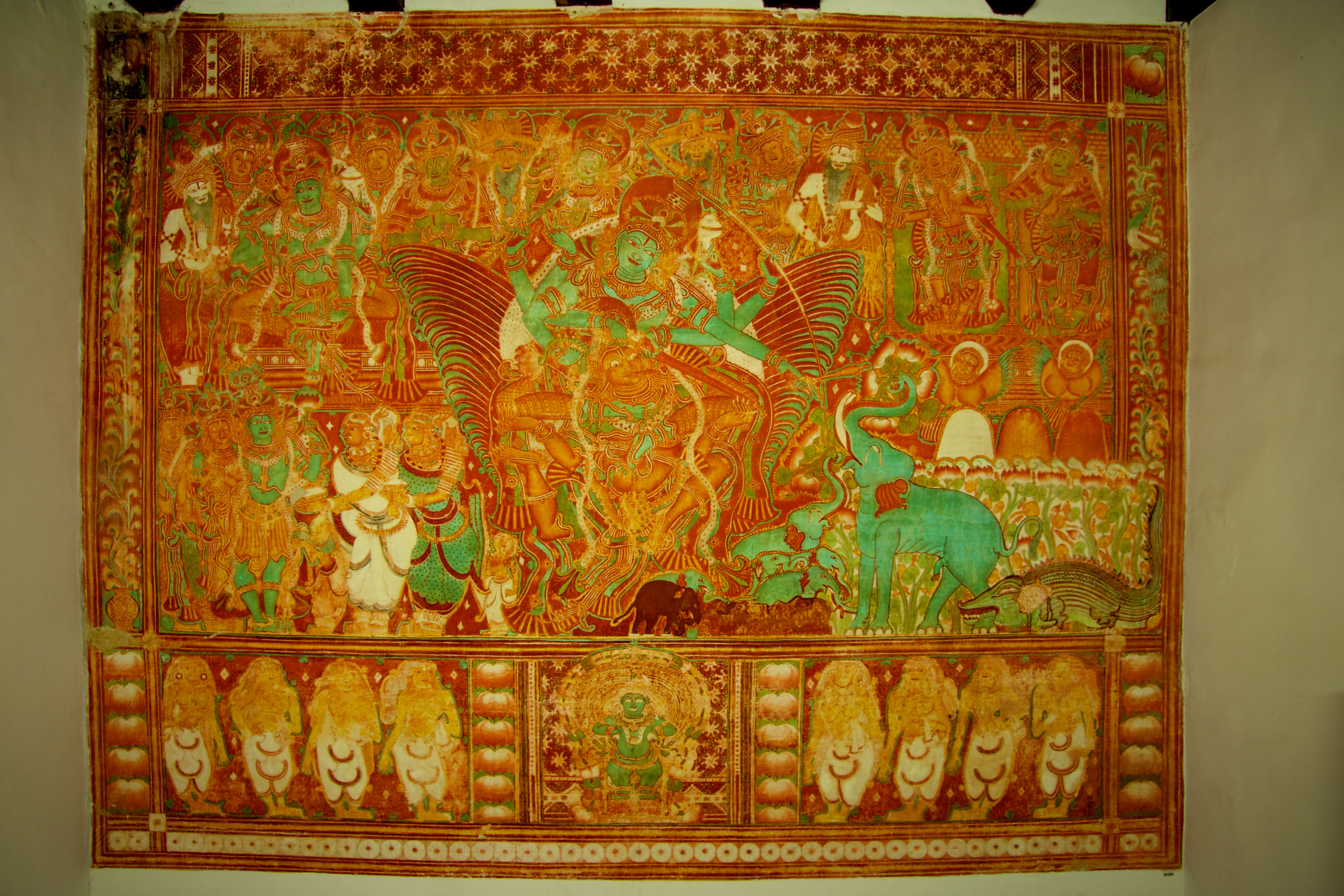
- Gajendra Moksham mural at Krishnapuram palace
- Interactive map of Krishnapuram
- Coordinates: 9°9′0″N 76°30′0″E
- Country: India
- State: Kerala
- District: Alappuzha

Population (2011)
  - Total: 26,705

Languages
  - Official: Malayalam, English
- Time zone: UTC+5:30 (IST)

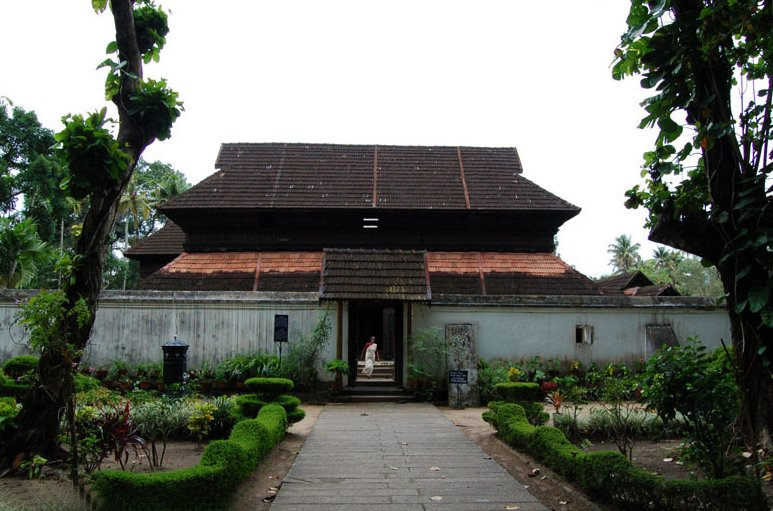
Krishnapuram palace

Krishnapuram is a village in Alappuzha district in the Indian state of Kerala.

== Demographics ==
As of 2011 India census, Krishnapuram had a population of 26705 with 12466 males and 14239 females.

== Notable sites ==
- Krishnapuram Palace
- Vethalan Kavu Mahadeva Temple
- Bishop Moore Vidyapith Kayamkulam school
