= Malappuram Kathi =

Malappuram Katthi
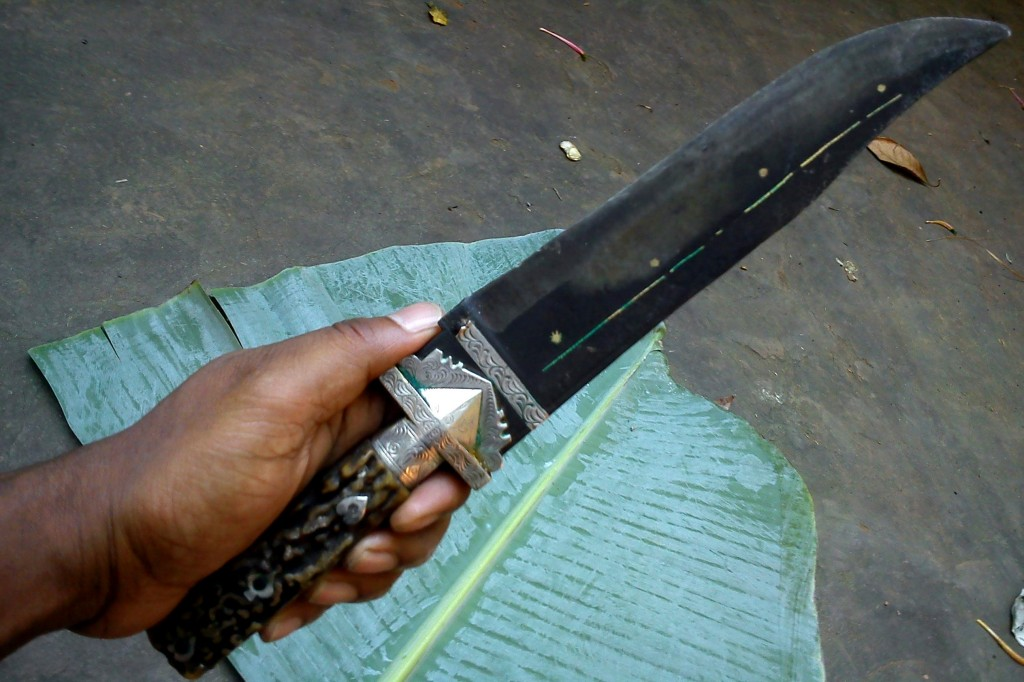
- മലപ്പുറം കത്തി
- Type: Dagger
- Place of origin: Malappuram, India

Specifications
- Length: 18–25 inches (46–64 cm)
- Blade type: Black metallic alloy
- Hilt type: Deer antler

A Malappuram kathi is a kind of dagger, originating from the Indian subcontinent, developed by few blacksmith families of Malappuram from Malabar region of Kerala in ancient times.

The dagger is unique in its physical appearance and features, as it has a very light-weight holder made of deer antler. The blade is thicker on the top and very sharp and lines at the bottom. The blade is full tang and continues to the handle and covers the handle in a small single strip. The dagger is 18–25 inches (46–64 cm) long. The handle is long enough to only accommodate the holders four fingers. It is said to be this short so that in combat, the opponent won't be able to grab the dagger from the beholder

Legend has it, that wounds sustained by Malappuram katthi are difficult to heal and that infections will often develop, also prolonging the healing. Some say this is because of the metallic combination of the dagger and the unique craftsmanship involved and the know-how of which has been passed on from generations and is restricted to only a few blacksmith families in Malappuram District of Kerala. This is one of the famous geographical indications described in the history of Kerala.
