= Kayamkulam vaal =

Indian sword

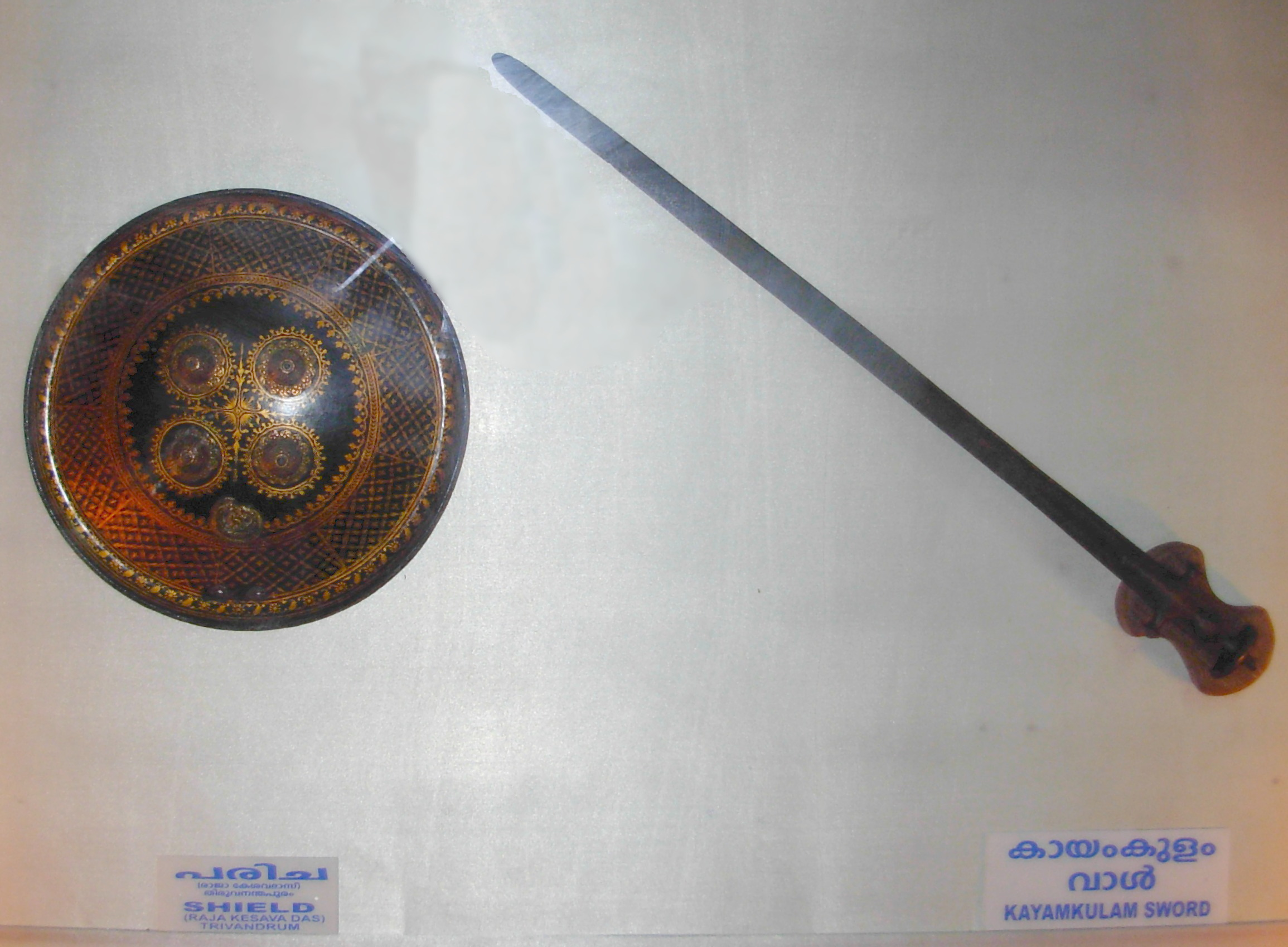
Kayamkulam vaal

The Kayamkulam vaal (lit. 'Kayamkulam sword') is a double-edged sword that was used by the rulers and soldiers (mostly in Travancore), in Kayamkulam, a princely state of India. An example is on display at the Krishnapuram Palace Museum in Kayamkulam.

It is said to have been used by the Kayamkulam Rajas in the 18th century.

== See also ==
- Khanda
