= Paniki (cutting instrument) =

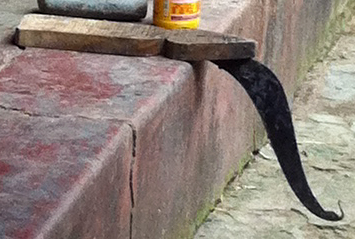
A paniki after being used for cooking

Paniki or Panikhi (Odia- ପନିକି) is a tool with a cutting edge and a wooden footrest, used for chopping vegetables, fish and meat. Panikis are mostly used in Odisha, India. A variation of the tool, known as Boti (Bengali- বটি), is found in the Indian states of West Bengal and Tripura, as well as in Bangladesh. Various tribes of Odisha used for different purposes. The tribe members of the Mutkia Kondha worship paniki as deity and do not keep their feet with their feet. They rather use a special type of paniki with a wooden stand. Panikis of ancient times show engraving of cultural and religious elements. Traditionally in rural Odisha, panikis are made from wrought iron or recycled steel by the blacksmith.

== In popular culture ==
In murals of the Ushakothi cave painting at Ulapgarh depict the use of paniki being used by a woman.
