= Dha (sword) =

Bughti knife

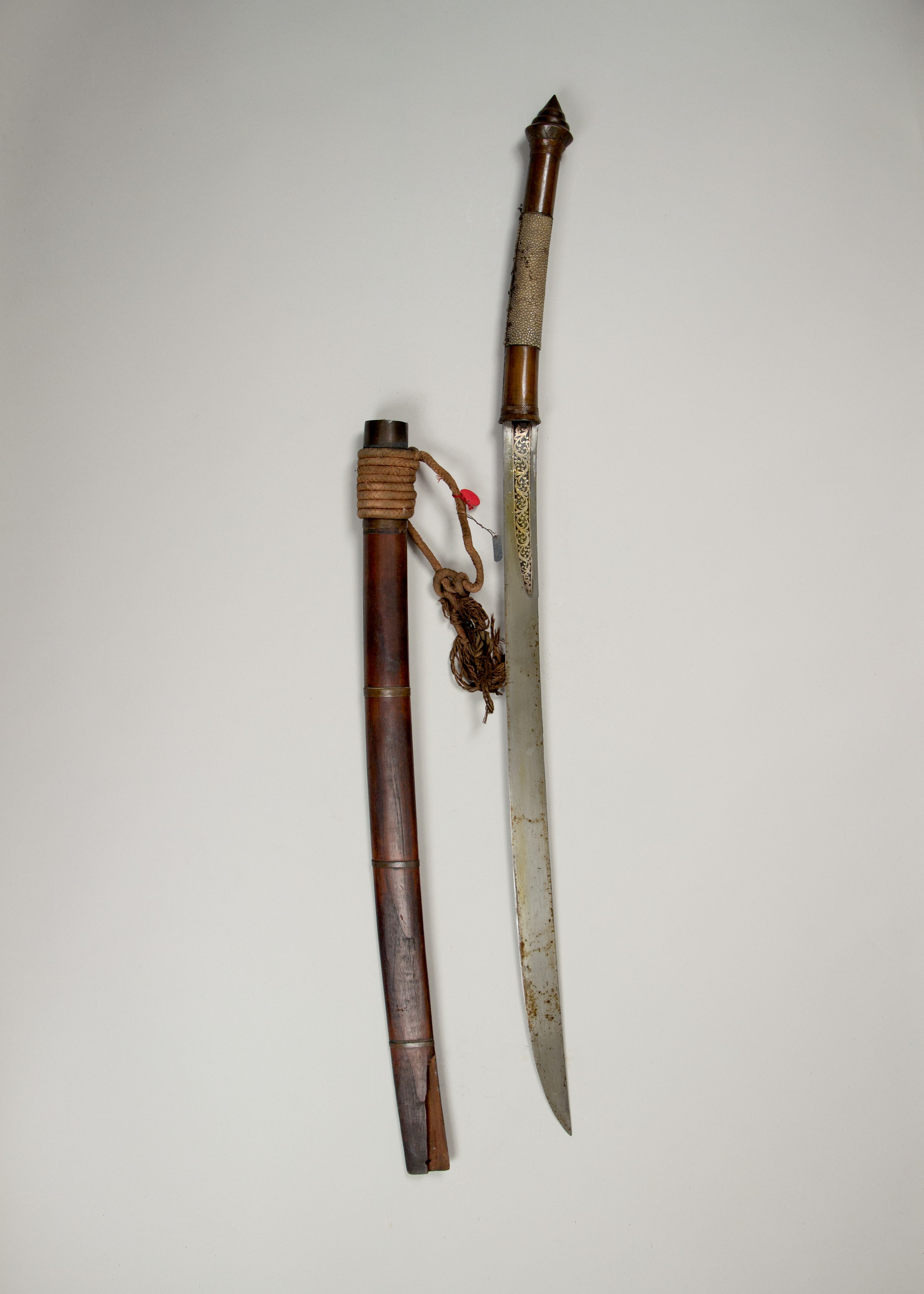
Burmese Sword (Dha) with scabbard; 19th century

Dha (Burmese: ဓား; also spelled dah) is a Burmese word meaning "knife" or "sword" which conventionally refers to a wide variety of bladed weapons used across Southeast Asia, especially present-day Myanmar (Burma), Thailand, Yunnan, Laos, Cambodia, and Northeast India. It is related to the Thai word for a single-edged sword, daab/darb (Thai: ดาบ).

== Origins ==
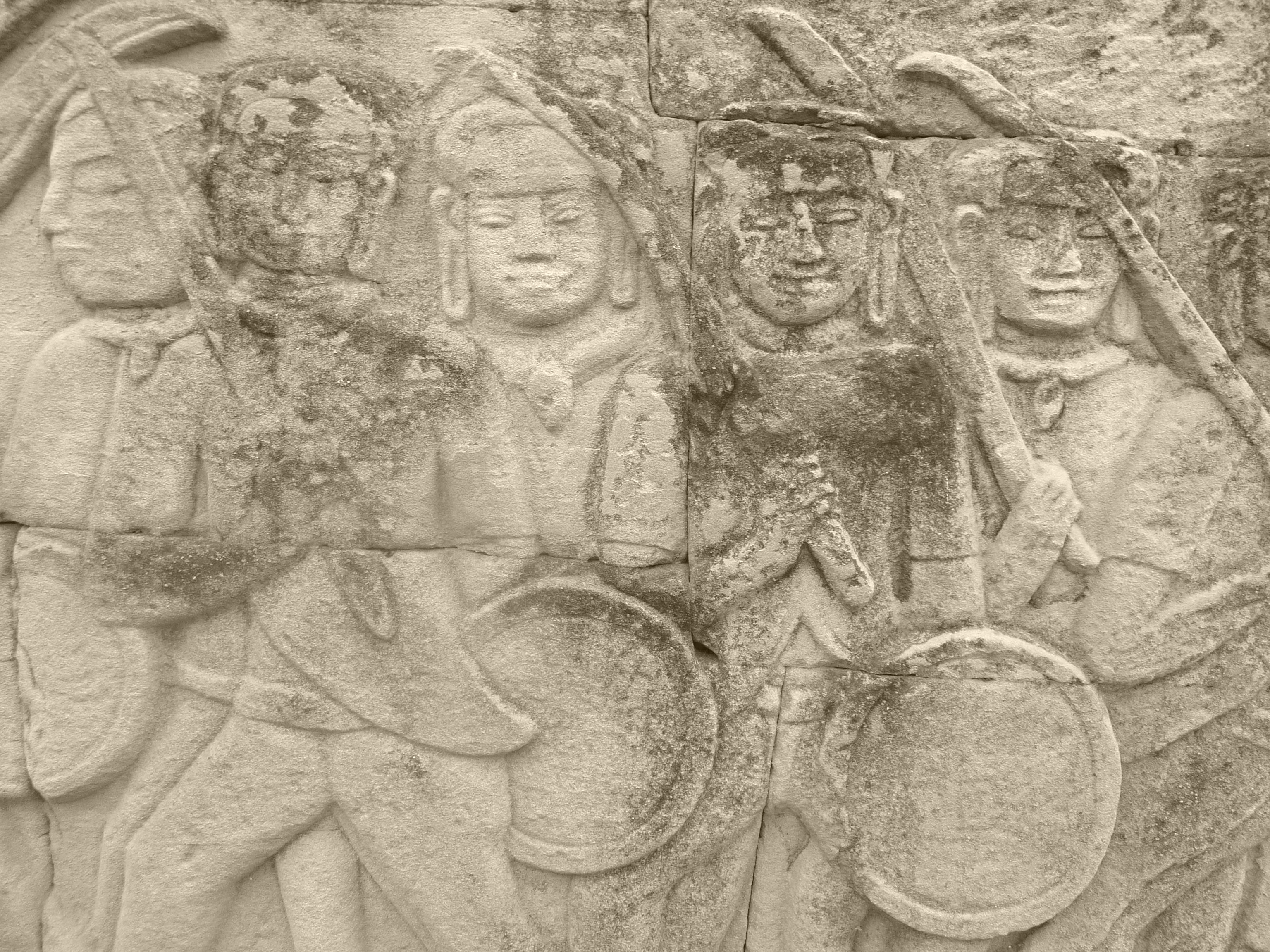
Soldiers at the Bayon temple (12th/13th century) wielding curved swords. Located at the ruins of Angkor.

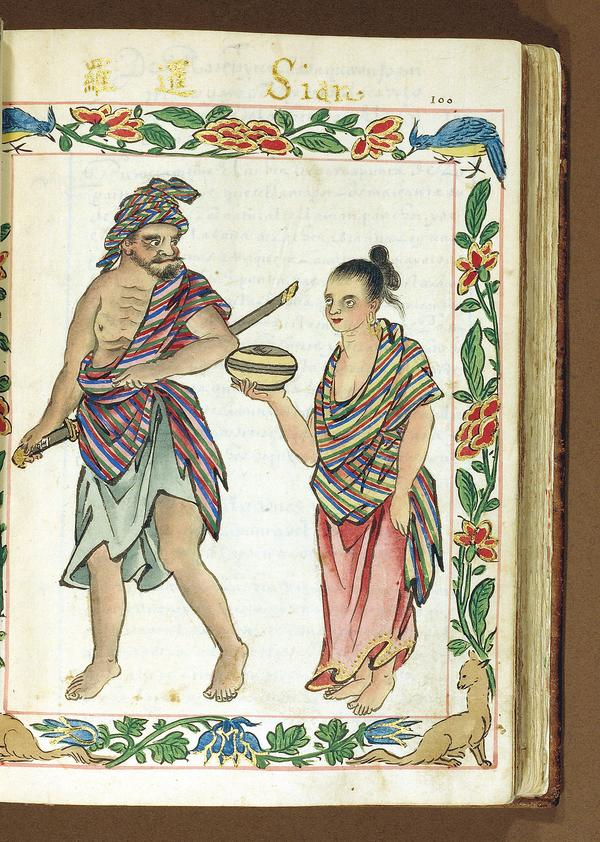
A man from Siam(Thailand) carrying a sheathed sword. This is from the Boxer Codex which is from around c.1590 A.D.

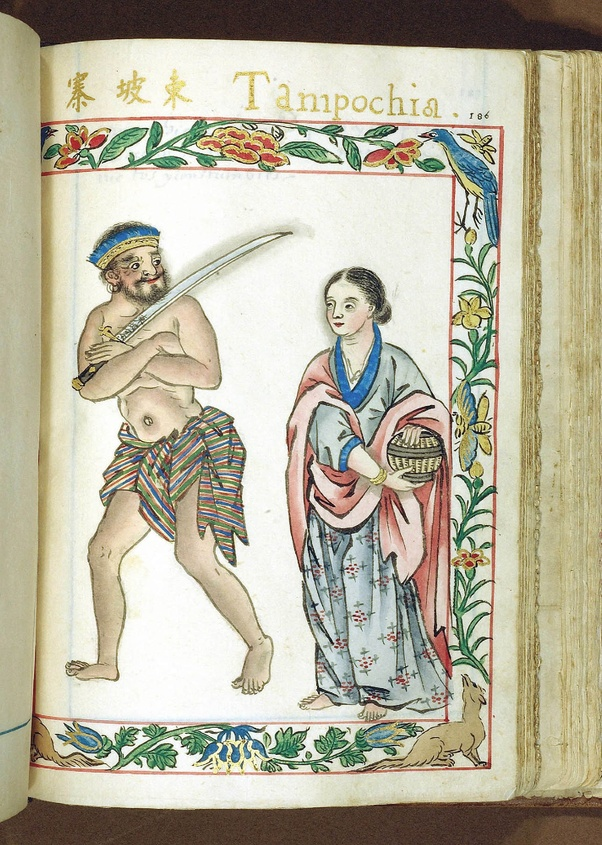
A man from Kampuchea(Cambodia) wielding a curved sword. This is from the Boxer Codex which is from around c.1590 A.D.

The broad use and diffusion of the dha across Southeast Asia makes it difficult to attribute the definitive origin.

The dha may have its origins with the Burmese people and Tai people who migrated to the area from present-day Yunnan Province in southern China. The Khmer and Mon peoples were well established before the arrival of the Tai or the Burmese people; perhaps they invented the dha as 13th-century reliefs at Angkor depict the weapon. The history of the region includes many periods where one or the other of these groups dominated, bringing along their culture and weapons to conquered areas.

Similar terms exist in the surrounding area with slightly different meanings. The Chinese word dao (dou in Cantonese) means knife but can refer to any bladed weapon with only one edge. From the Himalayas, the dao spread to Southeast Asia where it came into its present shape. While it is pronounced dha in Burmese, among Khmer-speakers it is known as dav (Khmer:ដាវ) and it may be related to the Malay words pedang and sundang, meaning sword. A related term, dap, means a long-handled sword in Malay. In Thailand, the dha corresponds to the krabi (Thai: กระบี่) but the equivalent Thai term is daab which is usually a single-edge sword. The Kachin dha used by the Kachin people has a long blade which is around 18 inches.

== Anatomy ==
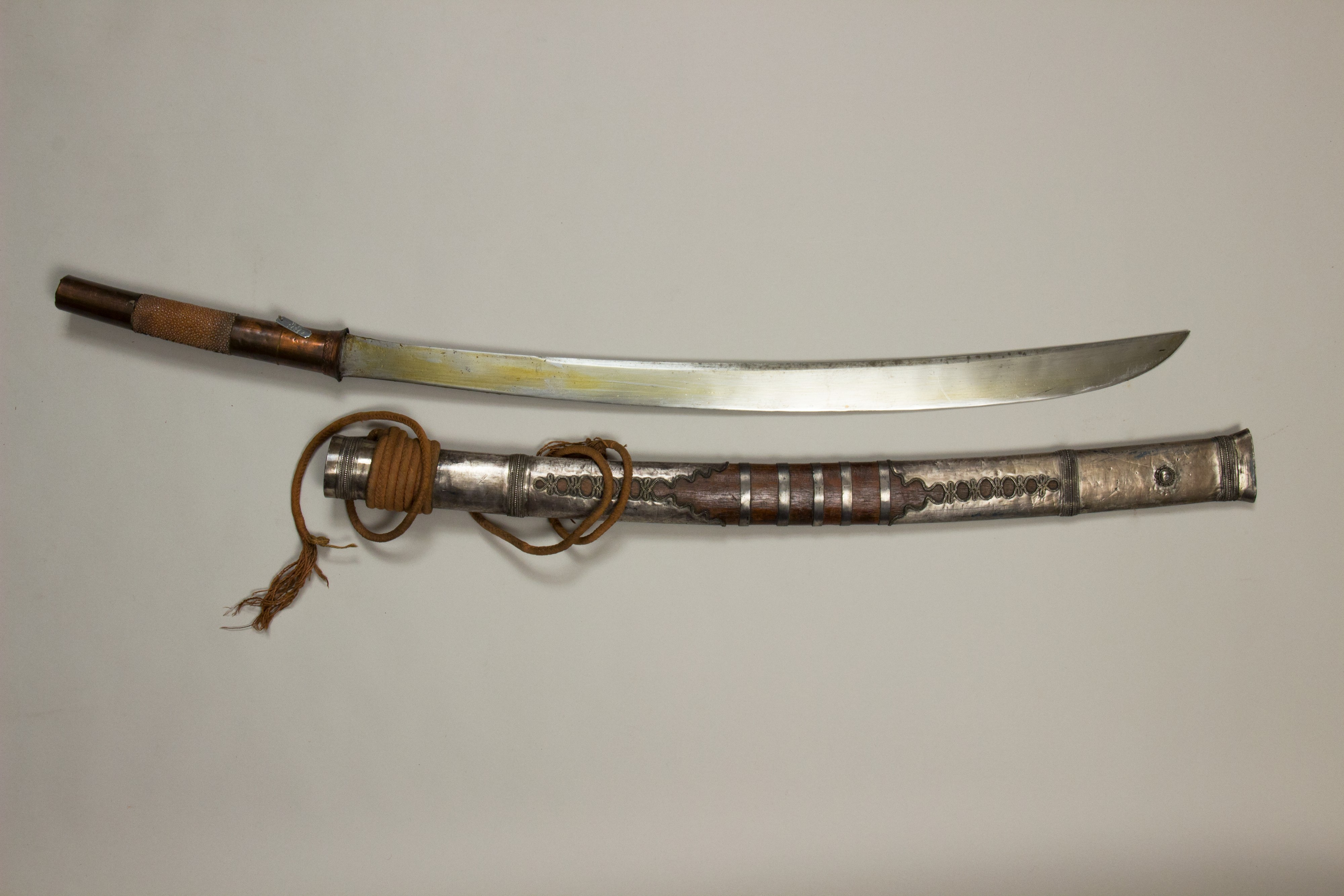
Burmese Sword (Dha) with scabbard and baldric; 19th century.

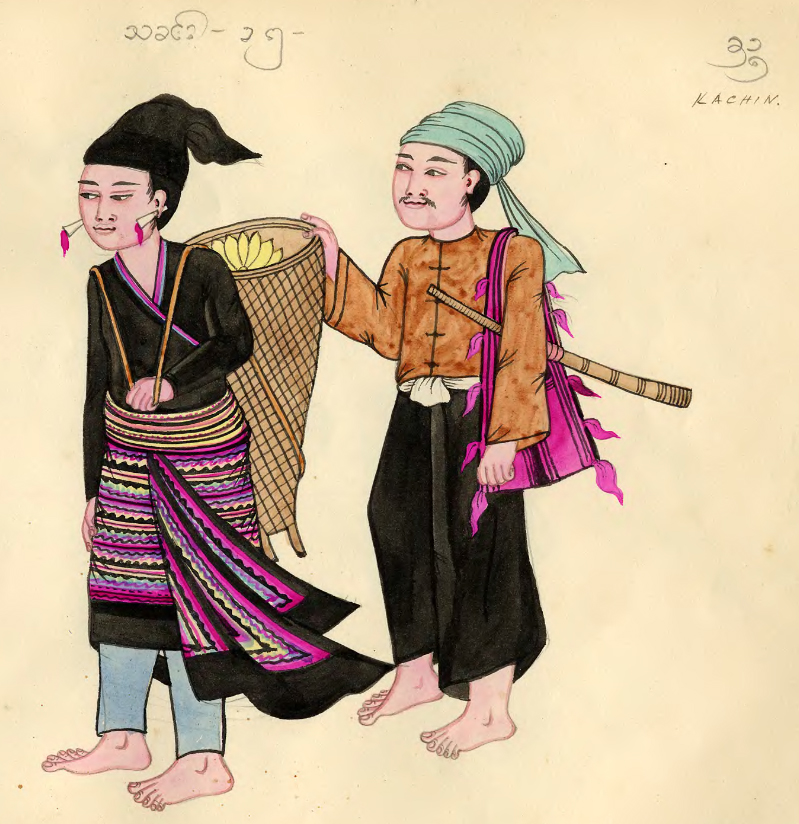
Kachin man carrying a Kachin dha, circa 1900

Dha vary considerably according to locality but they share a few features that define them apart from other weapons and tools of the area. These features are a round cross-section grip, a long, gently curving blade (sometimes upward, other times downward in the direction of use) with a single edge, and no guard. Knives and swords with these characteristics are viewed by ethnic groups of the region as being of a single type, albeit with variations arising from local style and tradition. There are a large number of possible shapes for the tip, with upswept, downswept, squared-off and spear-like varieties all being found. The blades are often inscribed, which can range from a simple maker's mark to quite intricate designs that may also feature inlays.

Hilts range from hand-width to quite long. A blade/hilt length ratio of 2:1 is not uncommon. Despite these long handles, most dha are meant for single-handed use, although some two-handed weapons exist. Guards are small, if present at all. Thai daab may have a guard similar to that of the Japanese katana. The montagnard dha may have a guard that barely exceeds the diameter of the handle and they can be regarded more as a spacer. The construction of the hilt varies widely by type and region or origin. Hilts range from simple wood, possibly wrapped in rattan or covered in ray skin, to elaborately worked silver and ivory. Pommels may or may not be present. Scabbards are made from two strips of wood, often bamboo, secured by metal bands, rattan (e.g., "village" dha), or completely wrapped in metal.

== Sub-types ==
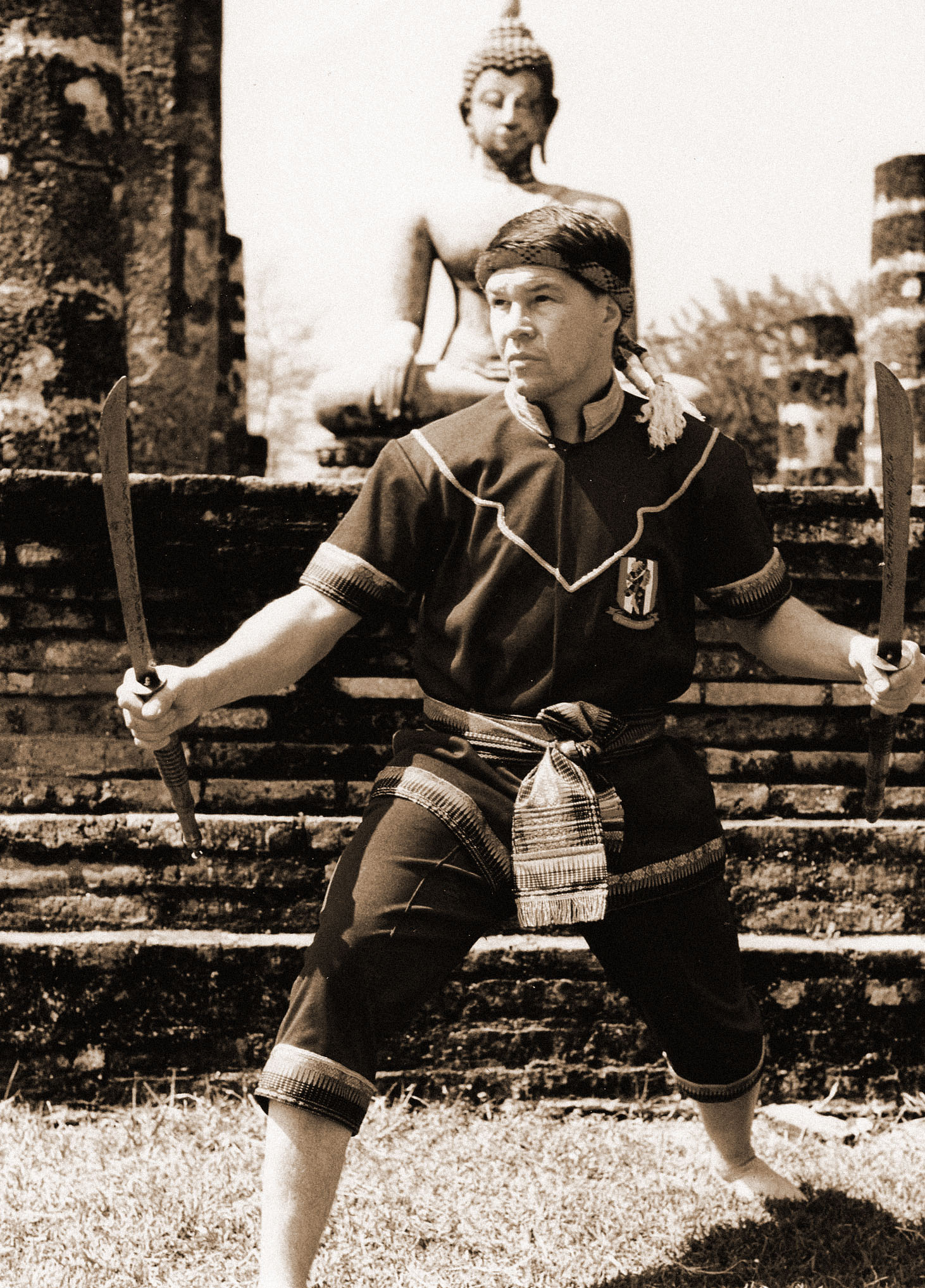
Krabi-krabong practitioner with Daab song mue, Thai double swords.

Shan dha

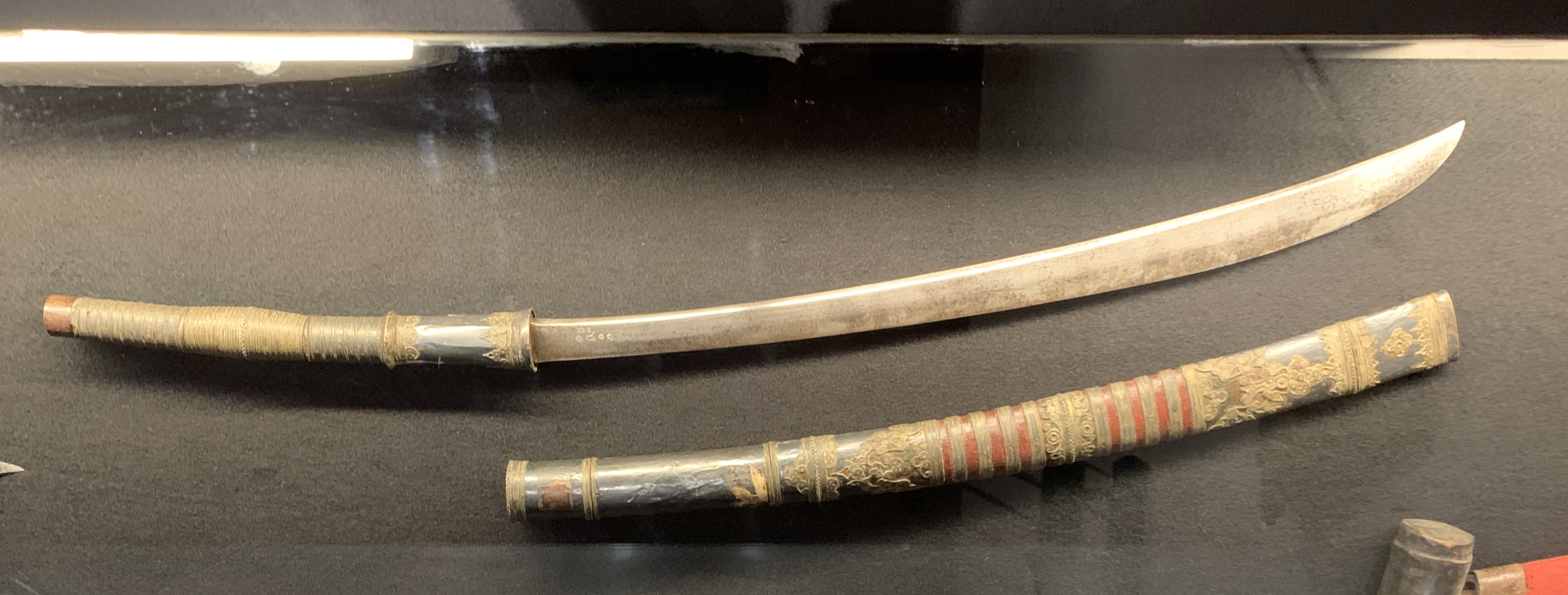
Lanna Sword, Bangkok National Museum

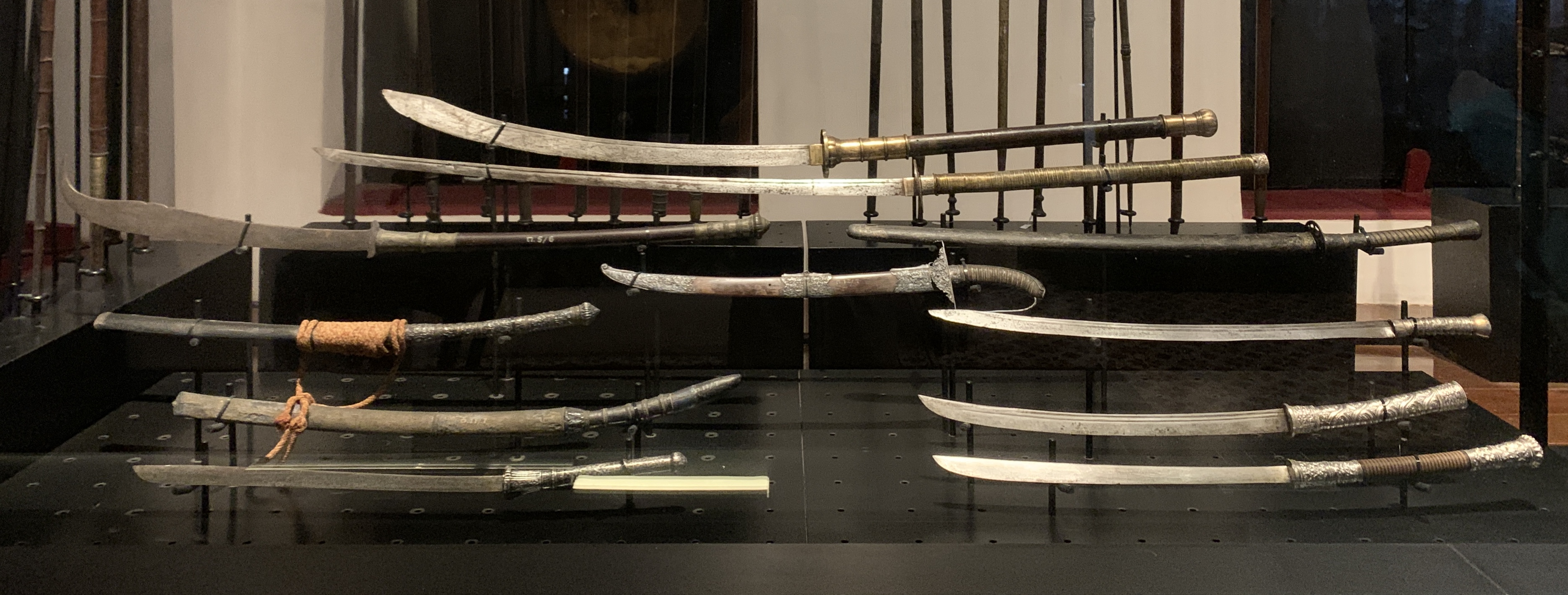
Collection of swords at Bangkok National Museum

- Burmese dha (ဓား); : The spine is straight (or mostly straight).
- Thai daab/darb (ดาบ): The spine curves slightly.
- Laos daab/darb (ດາບ): The spine curves significantly, and has more detailed carving and other tooling.

=== Burmese Dha ===
- Nghat kyee taung dha (ငှက်ကြီးတောင်ဓား): A single edge sword with a sharp point
- Dha-hmyaung (ဓားမြှောင်): A dagger
- Dha-shay (ဓားရှည်): A long curved sword
- Dha-lwe (ဓားလွေ): A dha-shay worn over the shoulder in a scabbard
- Dha-ma (ဓားမ): A chopper or cleaver
- Dha-mauk (ဓားမောက်): A paring or utility knife

=== Thai Daab ===
Ayutthaya shape (Central)

- Daab na luk kai (ดาบหน้าลูกไก่): A blade shaped like a chicken's face.
- Daab na bua (ดาบหน้าบัว): A blade shaped like a lotus.
- Daab na pla lot (ดาบหน้าปลาหลด) or Daab na tat khong (ดาบหน้าตัดโค้ง): A blade similar in shape to the Daab na bua.
- Daab hua tat (ดาบหัวตัด): A blade without a pointy tip.
- Daab hua tat chiang (ดาบหัวตัดเฉียง): A blade similar to the Daab hua tat, however, it has a more slanted shape.
- Daab na hua laem (ดาบหน้าหัวแหลม): Also known as the Lao sword, this sword has a pointy tip

Lanna shape (Northern)

- Daab ngao (ดาบง้าว): A blade with a ridged surface.
- Daab bai khaw (ดาบใบข้าว): A blade shaped like a rice leaves.
- Daab bai kha (ดาบใบคา): A blade shaped like a Daab bai khaw but more slender.

== See also ==
- Dao (Chinese sword) – Single-edged Chinese sword primarily used for slashing and chopping
- Dao (Naga sword) – Type of sword from northeastern India
- Hengdang – Single edged sword with long handle from India
- Langgai Tinggang
- Sabre – Type of backsword with curved blade, designed to cut and slash
- Banshay – Weapon-based martial art
- Krabi–krabong – Weapon-based martial art from Thailand
- Kbach kun boran – Cambodian martial art
- Panabas - Filipino sword
- Chinese sword
- Turko-Mongol sabers – Type of cavalry sabre
- Korean sword – Swords produced in Korea
- Japanese sword – Type of traditionally made sword from Japan
