= Pichangatti =

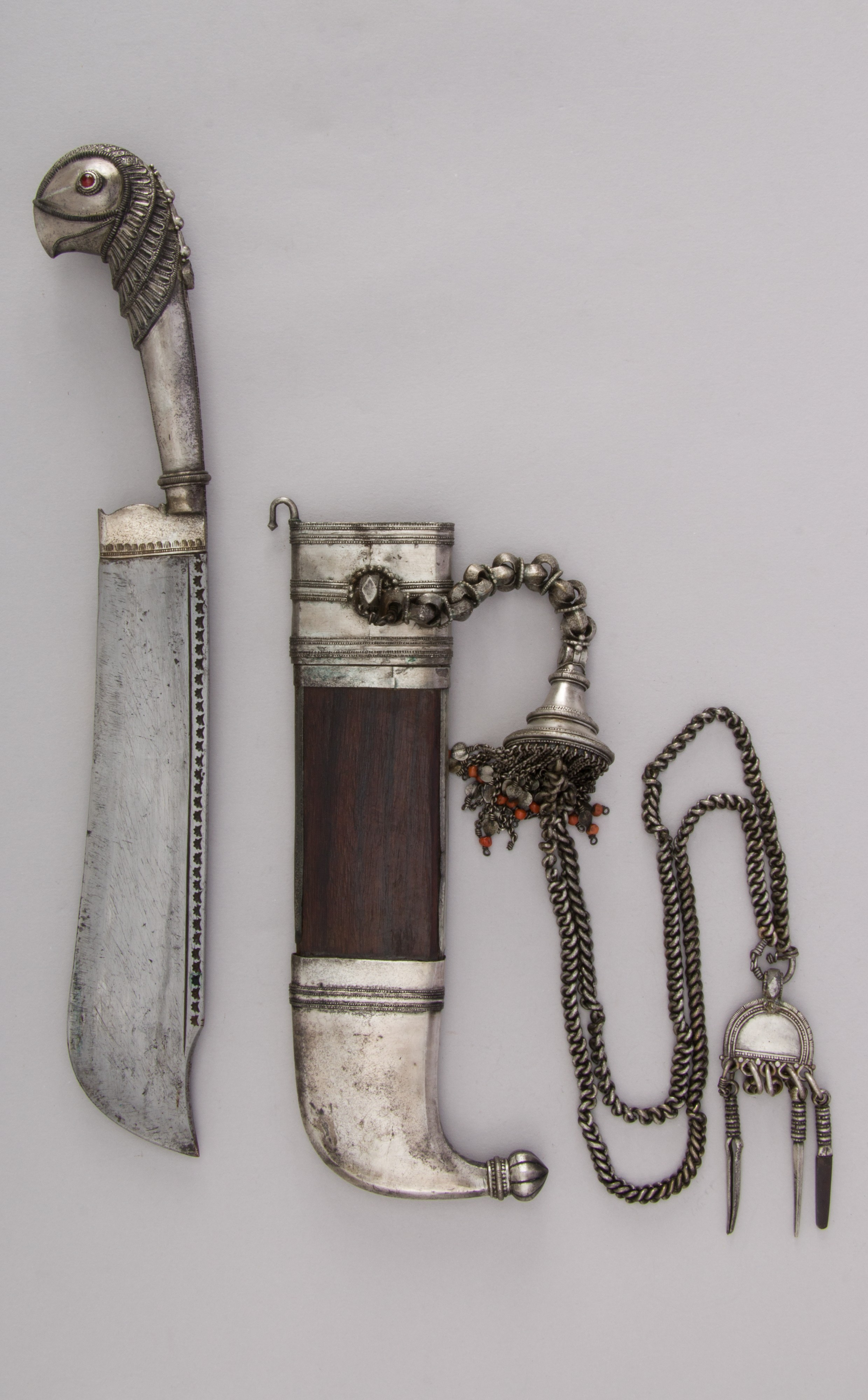
- 19th century pichangatti with its sheath.
- Type: Knife
- Place of origin: Kodagu

Service history
- Used by: Kodava people

Specifications
- Mass: 0.28 kilograms (0.62 lb)
- Length: 12 inches (30 cm)
- Blade type: single-edged
- Hilt type: silver
- Scabbard/sheath: wood, silver
- Head type: steel

Pichangatti is a knife of the Kodavas of Karnataka, India. The characteristic of the pichangatti is its silver hilt with bulbous-shaped pommel in the shape of a parrot's head. The pichangatti features in the traditional male dress of the Kodavas.This is a weapon used only by kodavas

== Origin ==
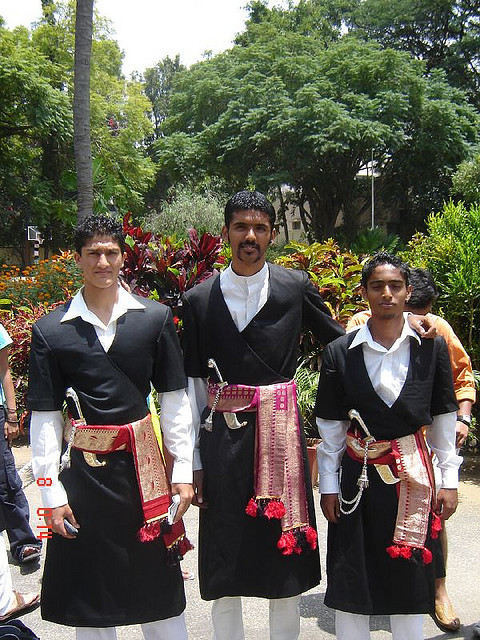
The Kodavas with the pichangatti slipped behind the waist band.

Pichangatti is derived from a Tamil word for "hand knife". Pichangatti was invented by the Kodavas. The Kodava people are indigenous to the southwestern region of India, which corresponds with the modern state of Karnataka. During the colonial period, the British named the region "Coorgi", a corruption of the Kannada word "kodaga" or "kodagu" meaning "hilly, steep". The word refers to the geographical condition of the region.

The Kodavas were known as tough warriors, establishing many wars against the neighboring nations to protect the sovereignty of their land. When the British Empire intervened the region in 1834, a war broke up between the Kodavas and the British. In 1884, a riot broke out near Malappuram. As a result of this incident, the British punished the Kodavas by seizing their weapons, including the pichangatti. It was recorded that "17,295 weapons of which 7,503 were guns" were confiscated by the British colonial administration. Most of these seized weapons were dumped into the sea, while the high-quality examples can still be seen in what is now the Madras Museum.

== Form ==
Pichangatti has a broad and heavy blade of about 7 inches (18 cm) to 12 inches (30 cm) long. The blade is single-edged, while the hilt ends up in a round bulging base. Pichangatti is heavily decorated, especially on the hilt and on the scabbard. These parts of the pichangatti are usually heavily-decorated in precious metal carvings e.g. brass, silver, gold, or a combination of these; in a very sophisticated design. Probably one of the distinctive features of the pichangatti is the carving of a parrot-head carved on the bulging base of the hilt. An uncut ruby is placed for the parrot's eyes. The hilt is usually inlaid with silver, but they can also be made entirely out of light-colored ivory. A brass or silver chain is attached to the scabbard; the chain carries various utensils e.g. tweezers, nail and ear cleaners, etc.

The scabbard of the pichangatti is made of wood (e.g. ebony) decorated with rich carvings of silver or brass. A silver or brass chain is attached to the scabbard. Attached to the chain are up to five implements used for cleaning and maintenance e.g. a toothpick, tweezers, ear-pick, a piercer, and a nail cleaner. The multi-function of the pichangatti and its small articles made them similar with modern day's pocket knife.

Pichangatti is worn by the Kodavas in front of their waist. They are slipped into the waist-belt together with the ayudha katti.

Video demonstrating the features of Peeche Kathi, Mande Thuni and Chouka

== See also ==
- Ayudha katti

== Cited works ==
- Atkinson, David J. (2016). "War Ayda Katti". Atkinson Swords.
- Egerton, Earl Wilbraham Egerton (2002). Indian and Oriental Arms and Armour. Dover: Courier Corporation. ISBN 9780486422299.
- Gahir, Sunita; Spencer, Sharon, eds. (2006). Weapon - A Visual History of Arms and Armor. New York City: DK Publishing. ISBN 9780756622107.
- Ganapathy, B. D. (1967). Kodavas (Coorgs), their customs and culture. copies available at Kodagu.
- Stone, George Cameron (2013). A Glossary of the Construction, Decoration and Use of Arms and Armor: in All Countries and in All Times. Dover: Courier Corporation. ISBN 9780486131290.
