= Ayudha katti =

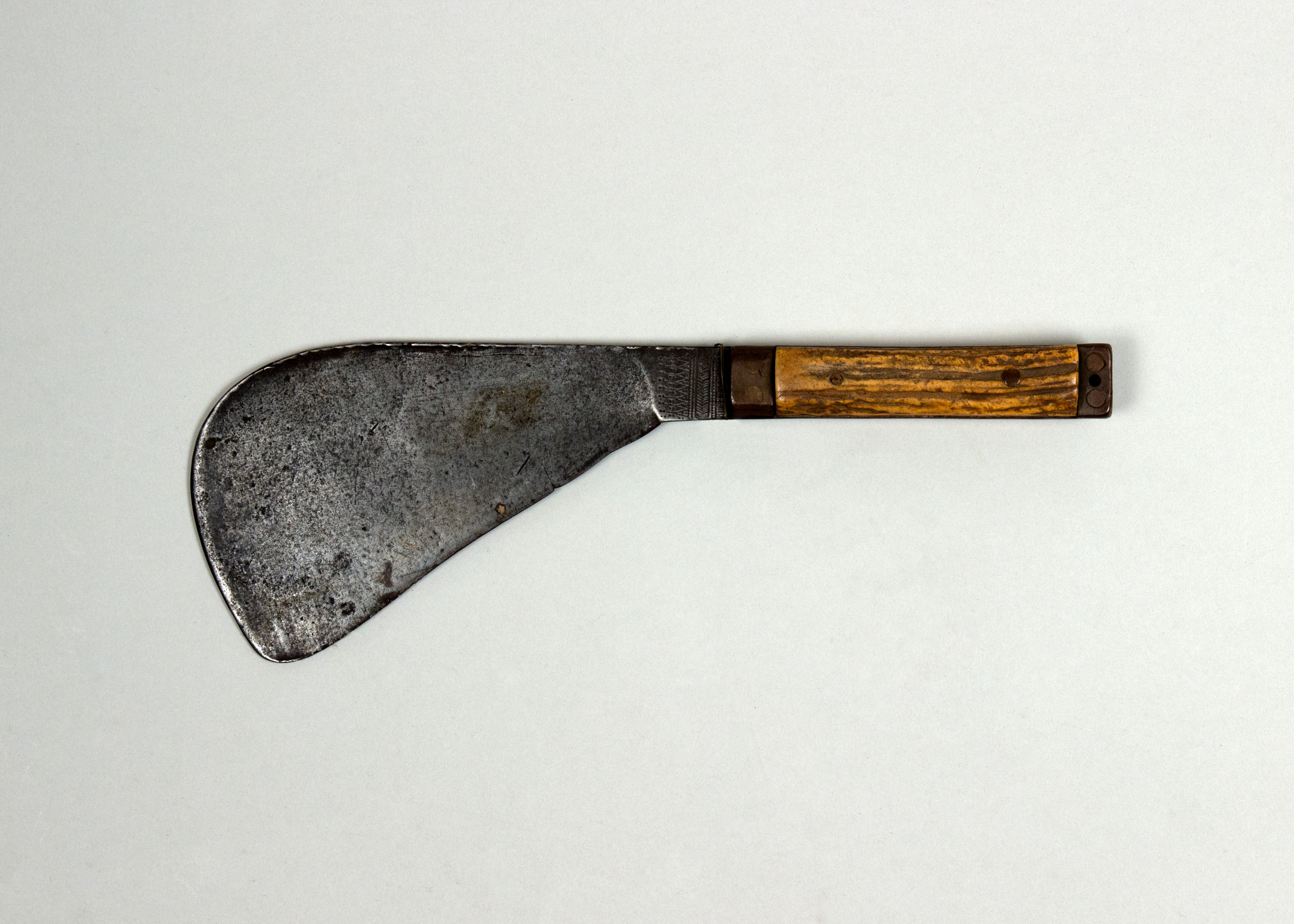
- "War" form of the ayudha katti, lacking the egg-shaped pommel plate on the base of the hilt. The shape of the blade of this particular ayudha katti is unusual.
- Type: Broad blade
- Place of origin: Kodagu

Service history
- Used by: Kodava people
- Wars: Yes

Specifications
- Mass: 2.5 pounds (1.1 kg)
- Length: 50 centimetres (20 in)
- Width: 9 centimetres (3.5 in)
- Blade type: Single edge
- Hilt type: wood, horn
- Scabbard/sheath: wood, silver
- Head type: steel

Ayudha katti (also written ayda katti or aydha katti or आयुध कटि) is an indigenous weapon of war and tools to the Kodava people of Kodagu, in the state of Karnataka, India. The ayudha katti is developed from an implement used to cut through dense undergrowth. Unlike most blades, the ayudha katti is worn without a sheath.

== Origin ==
The ayudha katti is the traditional sword of the Kodavas The Kodavas inhabit the region of Kodagu in southwestern India in what is now the state of Karnataka. The Kodavas have resided in the area for over 2 millennia cultivating paddy fields, maintaining cattle herds and carrying arms during war. The invention of the ayudha katti probably started around the 17th-century. It was first invented as an implement used to cut through dense undergrowth. The shape of the blade is similar with the Turkish yatagan and northern Indian sosun pattah, which indicates that it is related to the Ancient Greek kopis blade.

During the colonial period, the British named the region "Coorg", a corruption of the Kannada word "kodaga" or "kodagu" meaning "hilly, steep". The word refers to the geographical condition of the region.

== Description ==
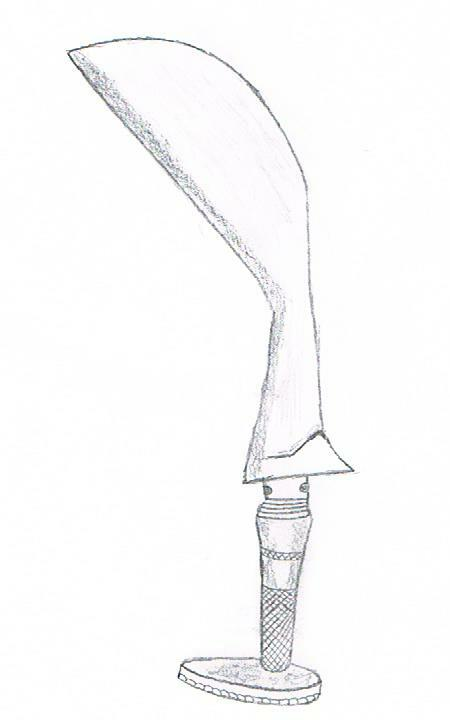
A sketch of the "prestige" ayudha katti with the most common shape of the blade.

The length of the ayudha katti varies greatly. Some ayudha katti can reach up to 50 centimetres (20 in) long. There are two known forms of the ayudha katti. The 'war' form is mainly used for melee combat, and the 'prestige' form is worn for daily use. Unlike the prestige form, the war ayudha katti lacks the egg-shaped pommel plate on the base of the hilt. The ayudha katti is one of the rarest of the edged- weapons.

The blade of the ayudha katti measures about 38 centimetres (15 in) long. The sharpened edge is located on the concave side of the blade. The top (the non-sharpened edge) of the sword is initially concave, then it tapers slightly for about a quarter of the length until it becomes extremely convex, and then it tapers quickly until the point. The widest part of the blade reaches 9 centimetres (3.5 in) wide. The overall shape of ayudha katti is short and quite heavy. The shape somehow resembles the moplah sword used by the Muslim population on the Malabar Coast, although unlike the moplah, the ayudha katti is sharpened only on one side and has no medial ridge. Ayudha katti is mostly a chopping tool, a very common weapon found worldwide. It was used for clearing the forest, as an agricultural tool, as well as melee weapon in war.

The hilt of the ayudha katti can be made of wood or horn (usually of the water buffalo). The pommel is a plate with the shape if an egg and is made of same material as the hilt. The hilt is often decorated with traditional geometric or floral carvings.

The ayudha katti is peculiarly worn without a scabbard. It is typically held in the hand while sitting. The prestige form ayudha katti has a special carrying device consisting of a silver chain that serves as a belt and a large brass ring for hanging the knife in the back of the blade's holder.

== See also ==
- Golok
- Moplah (similar, but with different hilt shape)
- Pichangatti

== Cited works ==
- Atkinson, David J. (2016). "War Ayda Katti". Atkinson Swords.
- Gahir, Sunita; Spencer, Sharon, eds. (2006). Weapon - A Visual History of Arms and Armor. New York City: DK Publishing. ISBN 9780756622107.
- Ganapathy, B. D. (1967). Kodavas (Coorgs), their customs and culture. copies available at Kodagu.
- Stone, George Cameron (2013). A Glossary of the Construction, Decoration and Use of Arms and Armor: in All Countries and in All Times. Dover: Courier Corporation. ISBN 9780486131290.
- Thurston, Edgar (1909). Castes and Tribes of Southern India, Volume IV of VII. Library of Alexandria. ISBN 9781465582393. This article incorporates text from this source, which is in the public domain.
