= Dao (Naga sword) =

Type of sword from northeastern India

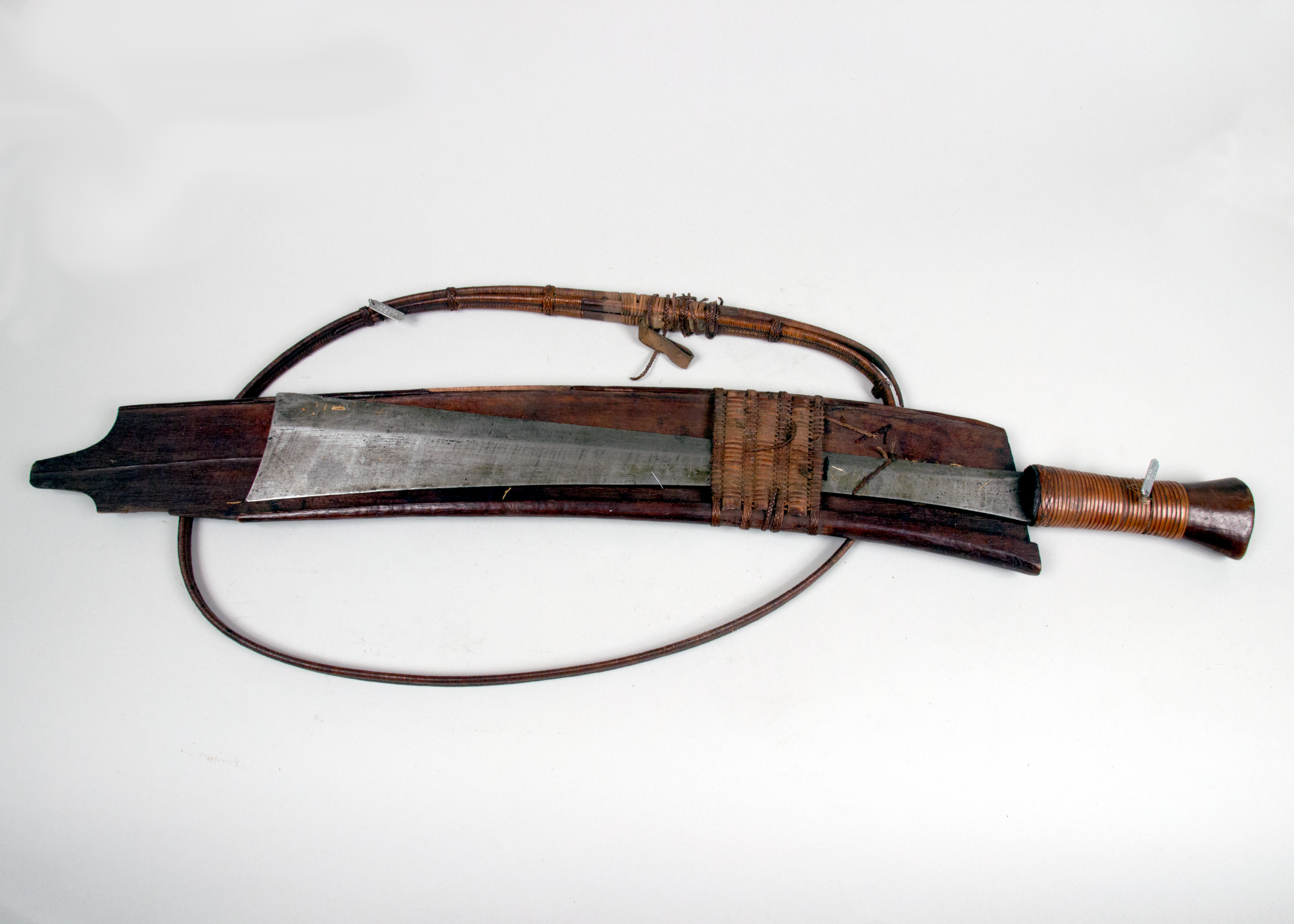
- Sword (dao) with scabbard and baldric
- Type: Sword
- Place of origin: Myanmar; India

Service history
- Used by: Naga people, Mizo people

Specifications
- Blade type: Single edge
- Hilt type: Wood, cane
- Scabbard/sheath: Wood, cane
- Head type: Steel

Dao is the sword of the people of Northeastern India, mainly in the Indian states of Nagaland, Mizoram, Manipur, Assam and Kachin, Sagaing region of Myanmar. The sword, with its wooden hilt, and unique square form is used for digging as well as used in historical warfare. In modern times, it is generally used for cutting meat and wood.Used by the Naga Regiment for various purposes

== Form ==
The dao broadsword can be found in Nagaland, Manipur, Arunachal Pradesh, Mizoram and Assam in the northeastern region of India and Kachin, Saigaing region of Myanmar. The dao has a thick and heavy form, which varies in length from 45 centimetres (18 in) to 65 centimetres (26 in). The unique design of this long backsword is that, instead of a point, the tip of the sword is a bevel which creates the appearance of a squarish shape. This form is also found in the Burmese dha, which is derived from the dao. The form of the dao was first adopted by the Kachin people. From here the form would evolve to the more elongated dha.

The blade of the dao is almost straight, with a very minimal curve that can only be discerned upon close examination. The blade is heavy and chisel-edged. It has a unique form in that it is narrowest at the hilt and the gradually broaden to the endpoint.

The wooden hilt has a very simple shape, without a guard or without a distinguished pommel. Bamboo root is considered to be the best material for the hilt. The grip of the handle is sometimes wrapped with basketry. Sometimes the hilt is decorated with a bronze cap at the bottom. The hilt may also be made of ivory, and occasionally can be well-carved.

A dao is usually carried in an open-sided wooden scabbard which is fastened to a rattan belt hoop. The scabbard is centrally hollowed out on one face.

== Functions ==
The dao is a tool common in all tribes of North East India. It is used for many purposes e.g. for building houses, to clear the forest, to dig the earth, to make the women's weaving tools, for hunting and for creating any kind of wooden objects. The dao was also used as a weapon in historical warfare.It is also used by the Indian Army's Naga Regiment as a military utility knife and was used by Naga troops for beheading Pakistani soldiers during the 1999 Kargil War.

== See also ==
- Dao (Chinese sword)
- Dha (sword)
- Boti

== Cited works ==
- Burton, Richard F. (1987). The Book Of The Sword. London: Dover. ISBN 0-486-25434-8.
- Greaves, Ian A.; Bowditch, Mark I.; Winston, Andrew Y. (2005). "THE SWORDS OF CONTINENTAL SOUTHEAST ASIA". Ars Cives Creativity. Archived from the original on December 7, 2007.
- Jones, Lee A. (1999). "Sword-daos of the Hill Tribes of Assam and Nagaland (northeastern India) and of the Kachin Peoples (northern Burma (Myanmar))". Viking Sword.
- Stone, George Cameron (2013). A Glossary of the Construction, Decoration and Use of Arms and Armor: in All Countries and in All Times. Dover: Courier Corporation. ISBN 9780486131290.
- van Zonneveld, Albert G. (2001). Traditional Weapons of the Indonesian Archipelago. C. Zwartenkot Art Books. ISBN 9789054500049.
