= Moplah sword =

Sumraal Khanjar خنجر سمرال
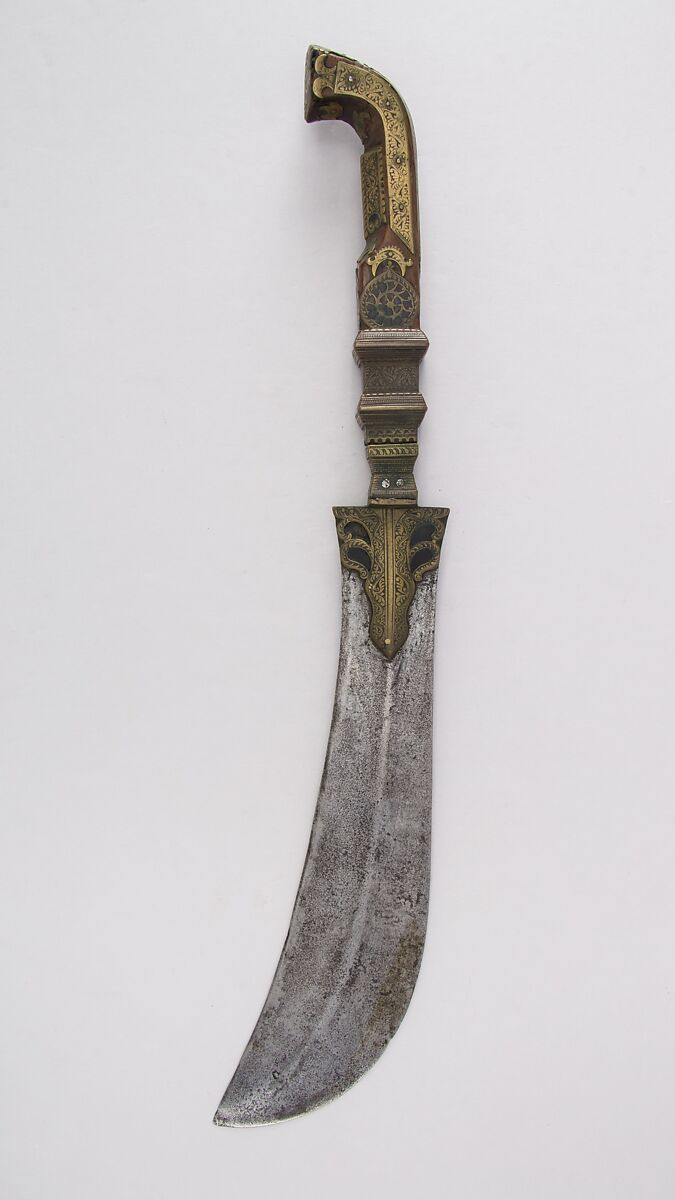
- Mappila sword
- Type: Sword
- Place of origin: India

Service history
- Used by: Moplah
- Wars: Moplah uprising of 1921-22

Specifications
- Length: 60 cm (24 in)
- Blade length: 35 cm (14 in)
- Width: 10 cm (3.9 in)
- Blade type: Double
- Hilt type: Metal, wood, horn
- Scabbard/sheath: None

The Moplah sword or Sumraal Khanjar is a sword used by the Malabar Muslim population in the Malabar Coast in southwestern India. The sword has been used since medieval times.

It is also known as the ayda katti.

== Characteristics ==
The Moplah sword has a wide blade that is broader near to the tip and runs slightly concave. The blade is polished smooth, with no hollow-ground. In some versions, the blade has a strong middle section, which extends up into the tip. The hilt can be made of wood, horn or bone. The pommel is often covered with a metal disk. At the transition between the blade and hilt, decorations are often found, and they are made of silver or brass. These decorations are of traditional or religious significance in most cases.

The blades are about 35 cm (14 in) long, at the widest point about 10 cm (3.9 in) wide and the sword has a total length of about 60 cm (24 in).

The sword is held in a belt worn on the back with the blade facing upwards. It is not kept in a scabbard.

== History ==
The Moplah sword is named after the Muslim Mappilahs, an Indian Muslim community.

== Gallery ==
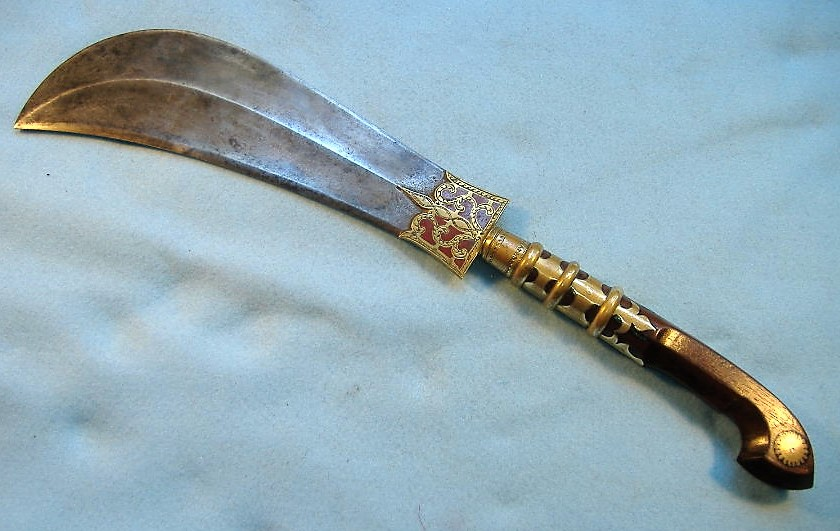

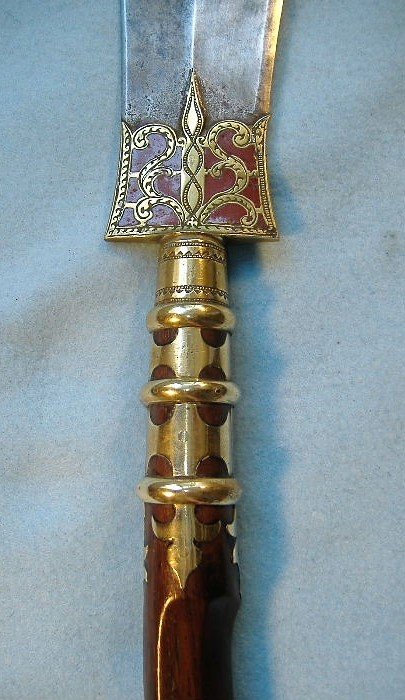

== Bibliography ==
- Stone, G.C., LaRocca, D.J. (1999) A Glossary of the Construction, Decoration and Use of Arms and Armor: in All Countries and in All Times. Courier Dover Publications ISBN 978-0-486-40726-5
- Egerton, W.E. (2002) Indian and Oriental Armour. Courier Dover Publications ISBN 978-0-486-42229-9
- Indian Museum (2002) Indian and Oriental Arms and Armour. Courier Dover Publications ISBN 978-0-486-42229-9
- Elgood, R. (1994) The Arms and Armour of Arabia in the 18th-19th and 20th centuries. Scolar Press ISBN 978-0-85967-972-5
