= Taming (disambiguation) =

Taming may refer to:

- Animal taming
- Animal training
- Taming (shield), a Philippine shield
- Taming Sari, a legendary Malay kris
