= Kalasag =

Shield used historically in the Philippines

The Kalaság or Kalasak is a large rectangular wooden shield used by precolonial Filipinos. While the word 'kalasag' can mean any kind of shield in many Filipino languages, the description of the article pertains to indigenous Filipino wooden shields.

== Description ==
The shield is made of hardwood and is decorated with intricate carvings and an elaborate rattan binding on the front. The wood comes from native trees such as the dapdap, polay and sablang. The shield usually measured about 1.5 m (4.9 ft) in length and 0.5 m (1.6 ft) in width. Its base is composed of rattan wood which is strengthened by the application of resin coating that turned rock-hard upon drying.

It was widely used throughout the Philippines for warfare. Datu Lapulapu was reported to have used this shield during the Battle of Mactan in 1521. In the Panay Bukidnon folk epic Hinilawod, the heroes in the story are depicted rigorously training, carrying, and fighting with the kalasag. The shield can also be used in an offensive manner. When the character Dumalapdap was being surrounded by a crowd of maidens, he "struck them with his shield" and "drove them with his shield" before threatening them further with his spear.

Among the various Cordilleran ethnic groups in the northern Philippines, their kalasag were distinctively shaped with three prongs on the upper edge and two prongs on the bottom. These were used offensively in close-quarters combat during headhunting raids and warfare. The three upper prongs are designed to be thrust onto an enemy's legs and are quickly twisted to trip them; while the two lower prongs are designed to fit over the neck of a downed enemy for decapitation with a head axe or a bolo.

Its shape is commonly used as part of the official seal of the Philippine National Police. Various kinds of kalasag are also represented in the provincial flags of Bukidnon, Maguindanao, and Mountain Province.

The officers who bears the royal regalia of the Sultan of Brunei such as the Panglima Asgar, Perwira Asgar and the Hulubalang Asgar carry the royal weapons of kalasak (shield) and kampilan (sword).

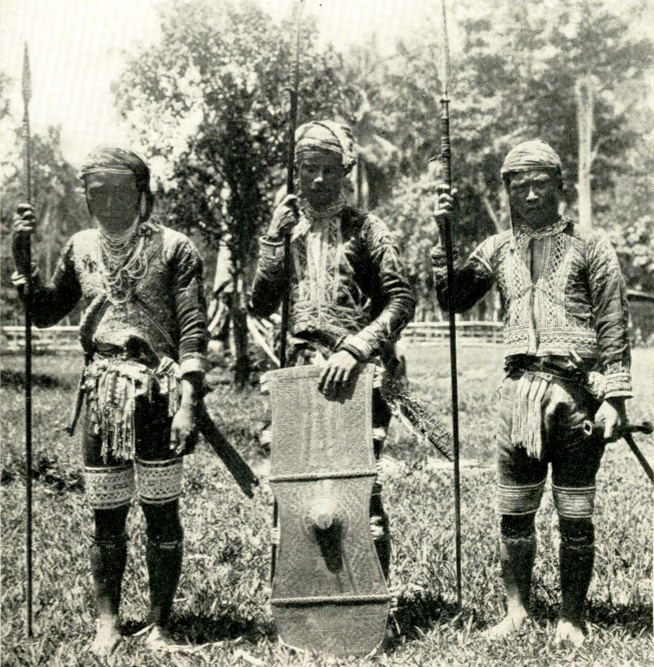
Bagobo warriors from Davao (1926), the warrior in the center is holding a kalasag

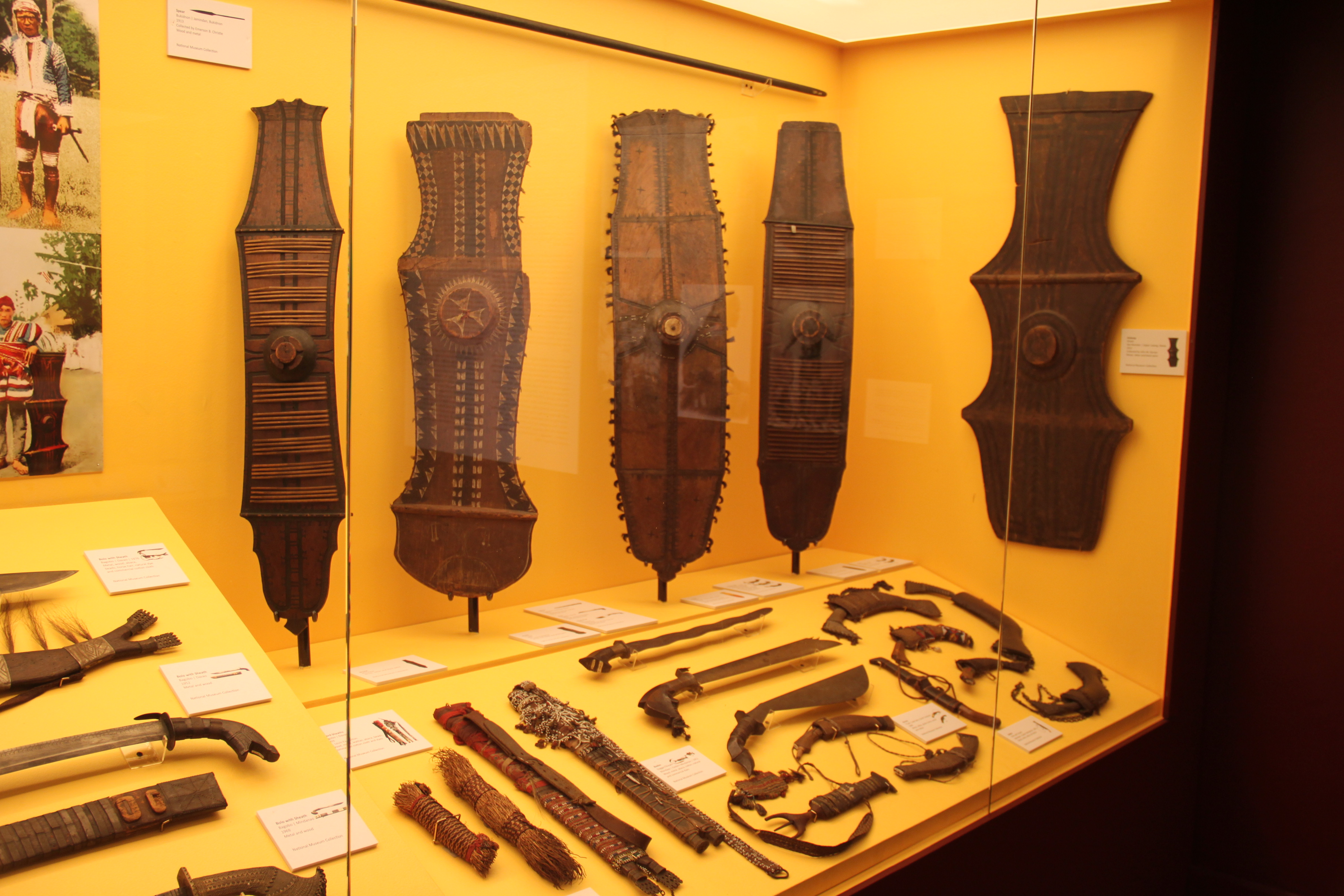
Various kinds of kalasag from Mindanao displayed in the National Museum of Anthropology

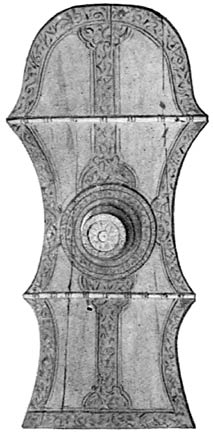
A Moro kalasag (c. 1905)

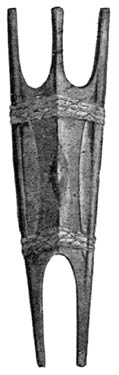
An Igorot kalasag (c. 1905)

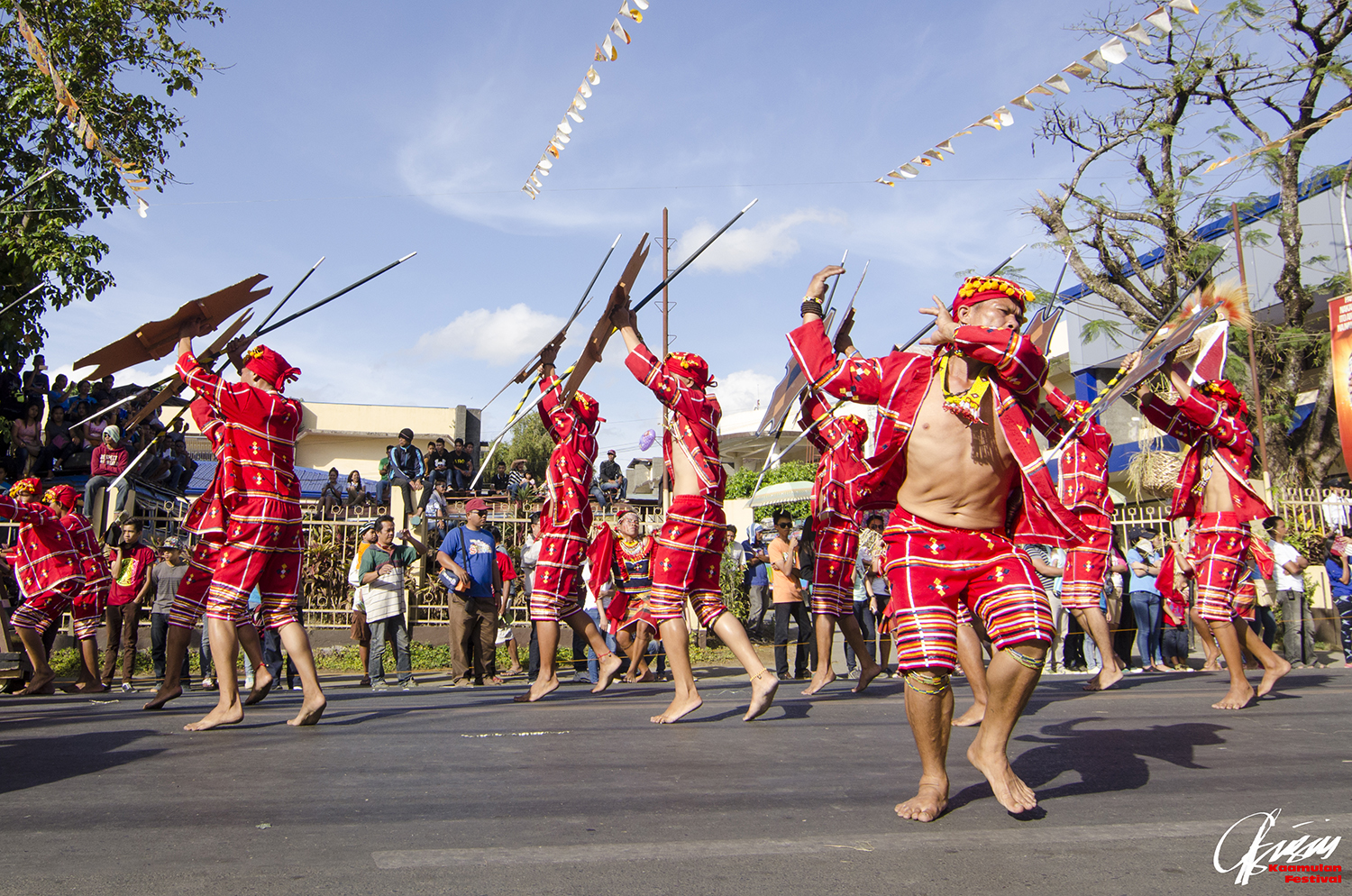
Manobo kalasag and spears during the 2016 Kaamulan Festival

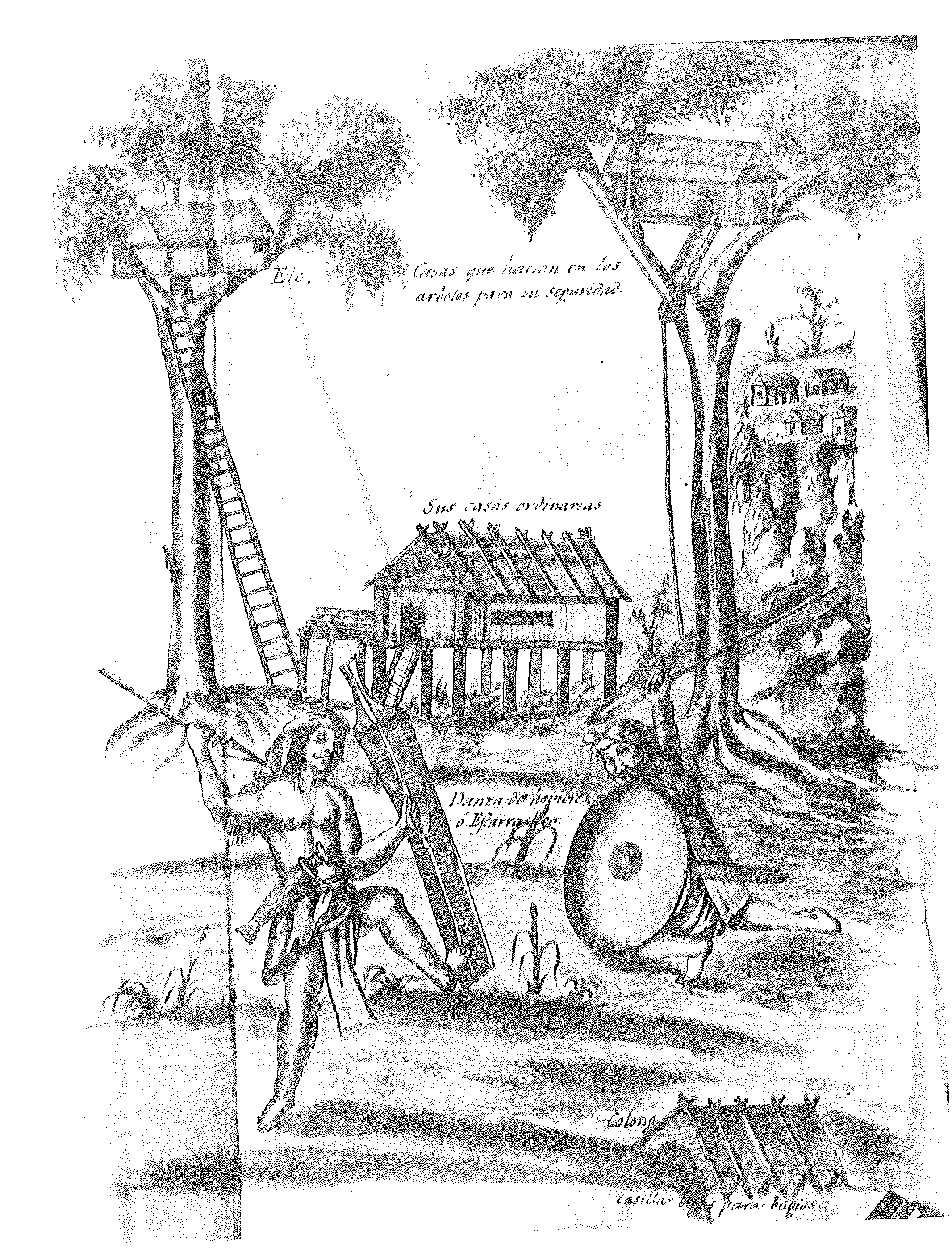
Visayan warriors with both taming and kalasag shields from the Historia de las Islas e Indios de Bisayas (c. 1668) by Francisco Ignacio Alcina

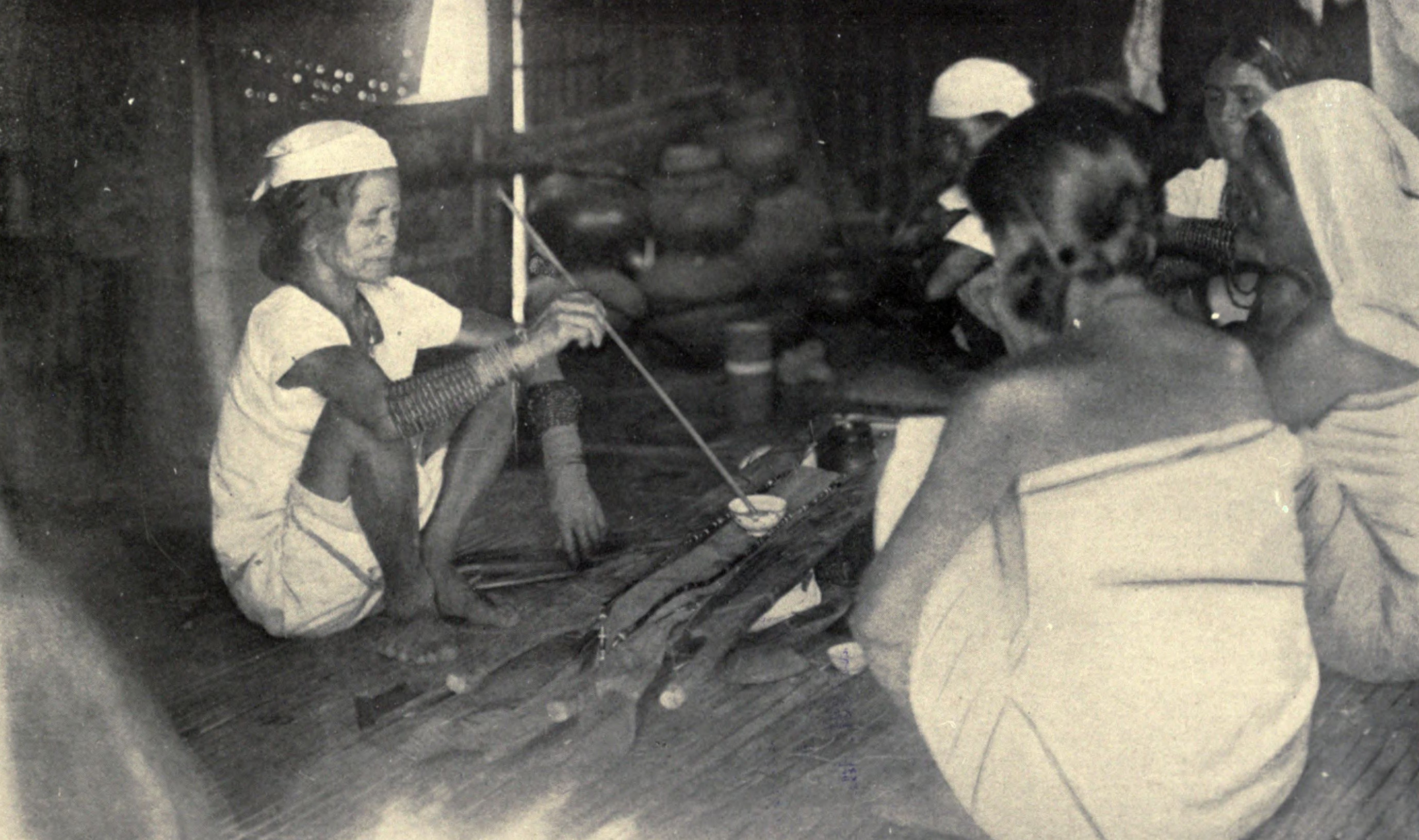
A 1922 photograph of a shaman of the Itneg people renewing an offering to the spirit (anito) of a warrior's kalasag

== See also ==
- Kampilan
- Taming

== See also ==
- Filipino Martial Arts
- Arnis
