= Young Moro Professionals Council =

Organization of young Muslim professionals in Mindanao

- YMPC logo

Young Moro Professionals Council, almost always referred to by its abbreviation YMPC, is an organization of young Muslim professionals in Mindanao.

In July 2006, YMPC and members of the international peace monitors, which oversees the peace talks between the Philippine government and the Moro Islamic Liberation Front or MILF, turned over a reconstructed water system to an orphanage in Polomolok, South Cotabato.

In April 2007, YMPC supported a Qur’an reading competition in General Santos hosted by Office on Muslim Affairs, a government agency mandated to uplift and improve the conditions of the Muslims in the Philippines

In September 2008, YMPC was one of the non-government organizations that assisted the internally displaced persons (IDPs) in Maasim, Sarangani after some “lawless” members of MILF attacked the municipality.

YMPC has provided Muslim inmates and orphans with food and clothes, and free tutorials to Muslim graduating high school students in Sarangani to help them pass college scholarship examinations.

== See also ==
- Bangsamoro
- Moro people
