= Head axe =

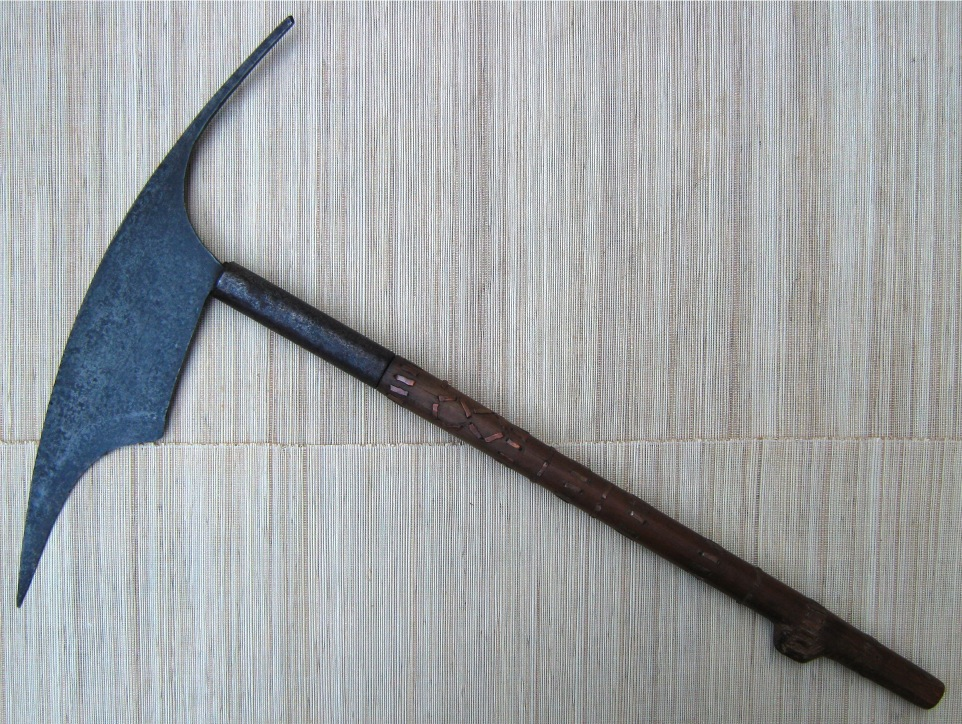
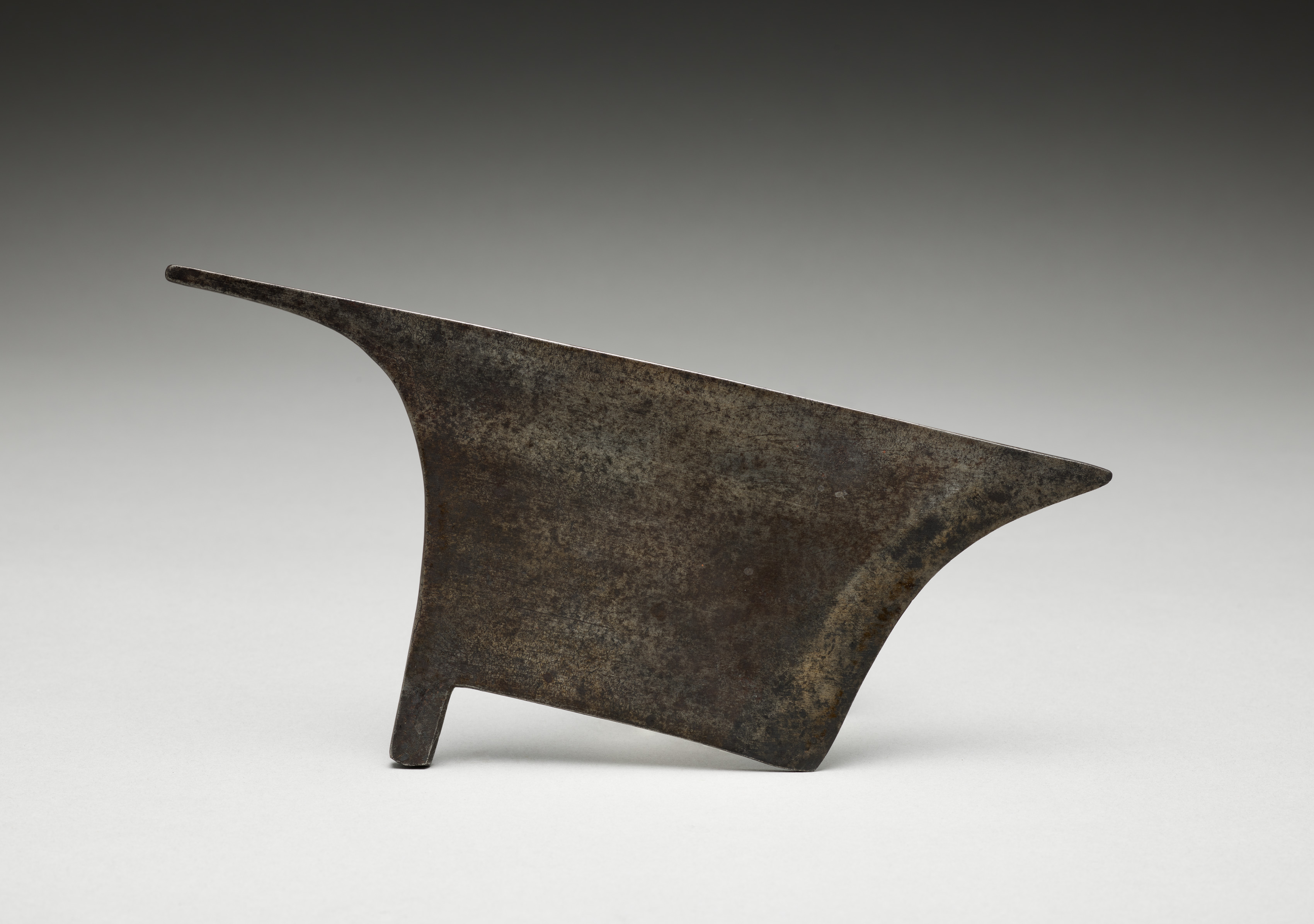
- Top: A Kalinga head axe; Bottom: A head axe, c. early 20th century, Cleveland Museum of Art
- Type: Axe
- Place of origin: Philippines

Service history
- Used by: Cordilleran peoples (Igorot)

The head axe, also known as headhunter's axe, is a battle axe of the Cordilleran peoples of the Philippines specialized for beheading enemy combatants during headhunting raids. They are distinctively shaped, with a concave or straight thin blade and an elongated backward spike on the upper corners of the poll. Their native names and designs varied by ethnic group, ranging from axes with curving slender designs to heavy axes with short heads and straight edges. Head axes, like most other pre-colonial bladed weapons of the Philippines, were also utilitarian. They were also used for cutting trees, clearing undergrowth, or even cutting hair. Smaller hatchet-like versions were used by women for agricultural work.

== Names ==
Head axes are most widely known as aliwa among the Ga'dang people of Paracelis and other settlements of Ga'dang Apayao (Isneg) and Itneg people, a name which has carried over to the lowlander Ilocano people. They are also known as gaman among the Ifugao and Itneg people; pinong, pin-nang, or pinangas among the Bontoc people; sinawit among the Kalinga people; wasay among the Kankanaey people; and guwasay among the Ibaloi people.

== Description ==
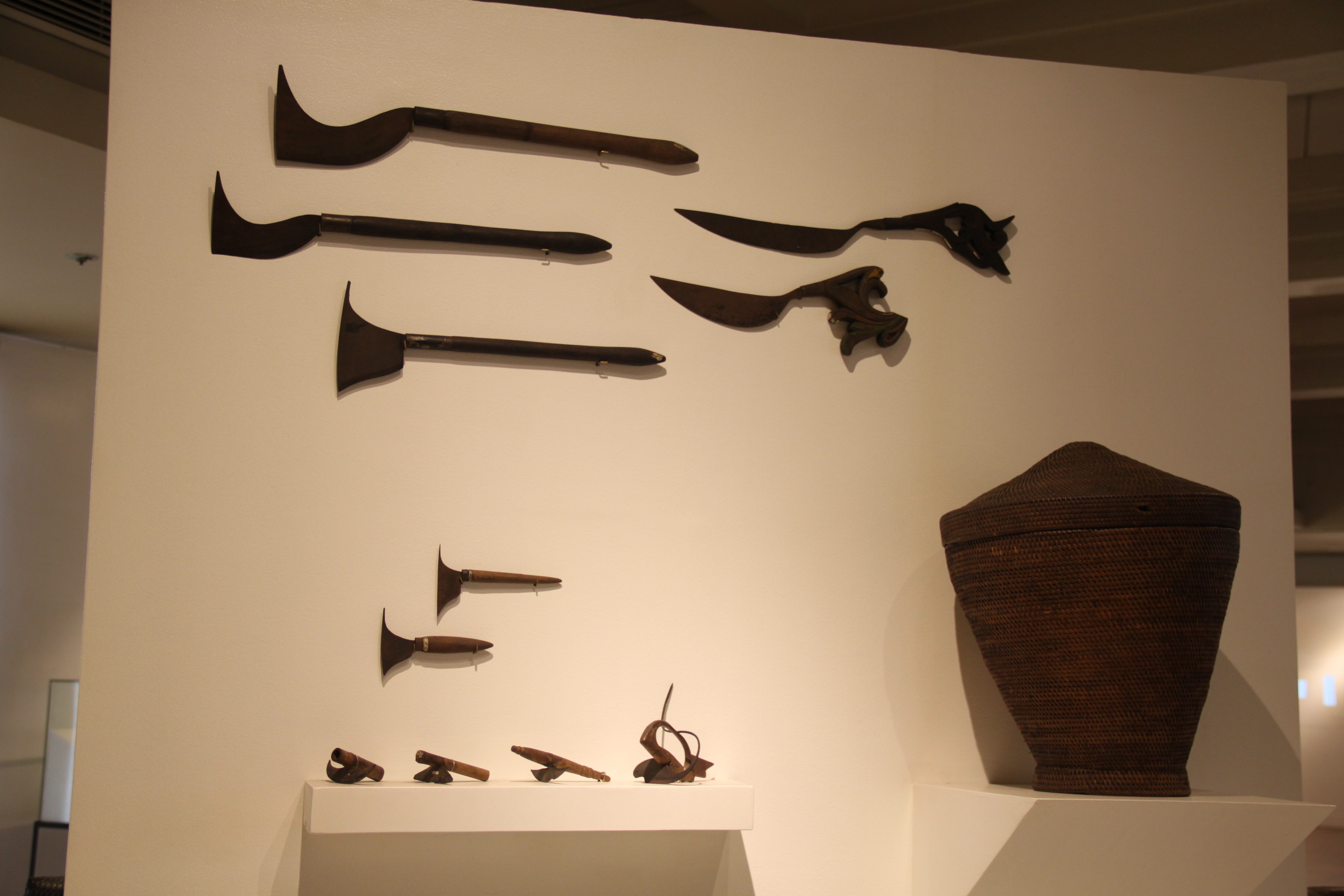
Apayao head axes (upper left) in the National Museum of Anthropology. Also note the smaller women's iko hatchets in the lower left.

Head axes all have long slender spikes on the upper back edge of the poll. Unlike European axes, the head axe is thin throughout because the haft does not go through the axe-head. It is only attached to the base of the blade via a metal tang that is bound to the wood by a metal ring, similar to bolos and other native Filipino swords. They also have a protruding stub or spur near the bottom end of the wooden haft for better grip.

Among the Ifugao and Kalinga, the axe-head generally has a curving concave front upper edge (the toe) and a concave bit. Among the Itneg and Bontoc, the upper edge and the bit are generally straight, with shorter axe-heads. The Apayao design is unique in that the length of the axe-head is longer, resembling a short bolo or a panabas, with a concave bit and a straight upper edge.

== Usage ==
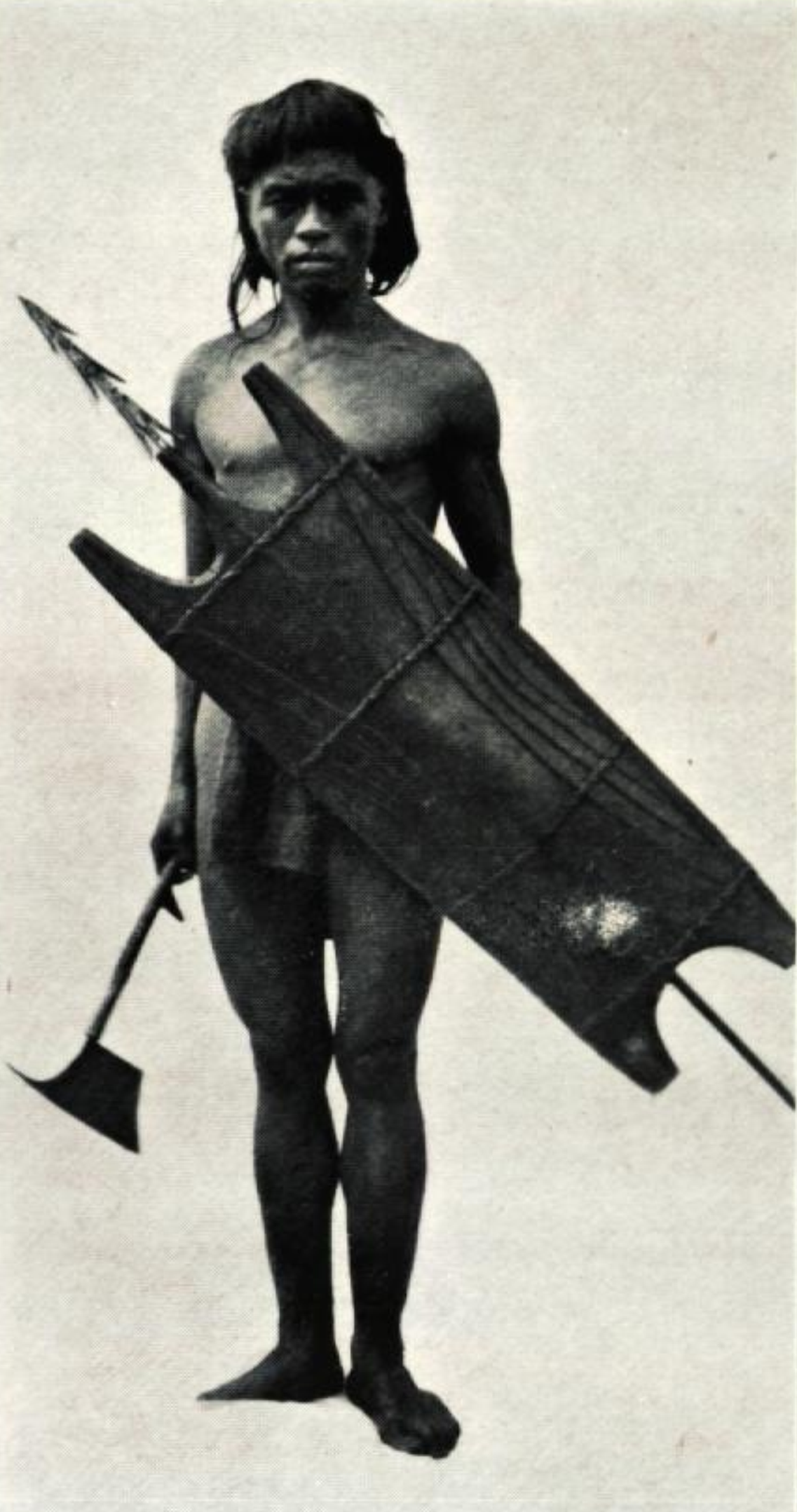
A fully-armed Bontoc warrior with a head axe, a kalasag shield, and a three-pronged fan′-kao spear

Head axes, along with bolos, were used in close-quarters combat alongside the kalasag shield. The shield has specially designed prongs on both the upper and lower edges. The three upper prongs were designed to be thrust unto an enemy's legs and were quickly twisted to trip them; while the two lower prongs were designed to fit over the neck of a downed enemy for decapitation with the axe.

Not all head axes were used for warfare. Among the Ibaloi people, the guwasay was only used as a tool, with other weapons (like spears, war clubs, and bows) being preferred in warfare. Among the Kankanaey, head axes are differentiated into ones used for headhunting and ones used only for utilitarian purposes.

Small hatchet-like versions known as the iko were also used by Apayao women for harvesting crops and other various utilitarian purposes. These were distinctively tucked into the headdresses of women when they were out working on the fields.

== In modern times ==
Head axes were outlawed, along with headhunting practices, during the American colonial period of the Philippines in the early 20th century. They have largely been replaced with the bolos of lowlander Filipino cultures.

== See also ==
- Panabas
- Kalasag
- Sibat
