= Taming (shield) =

Shield used historically in the Philippines

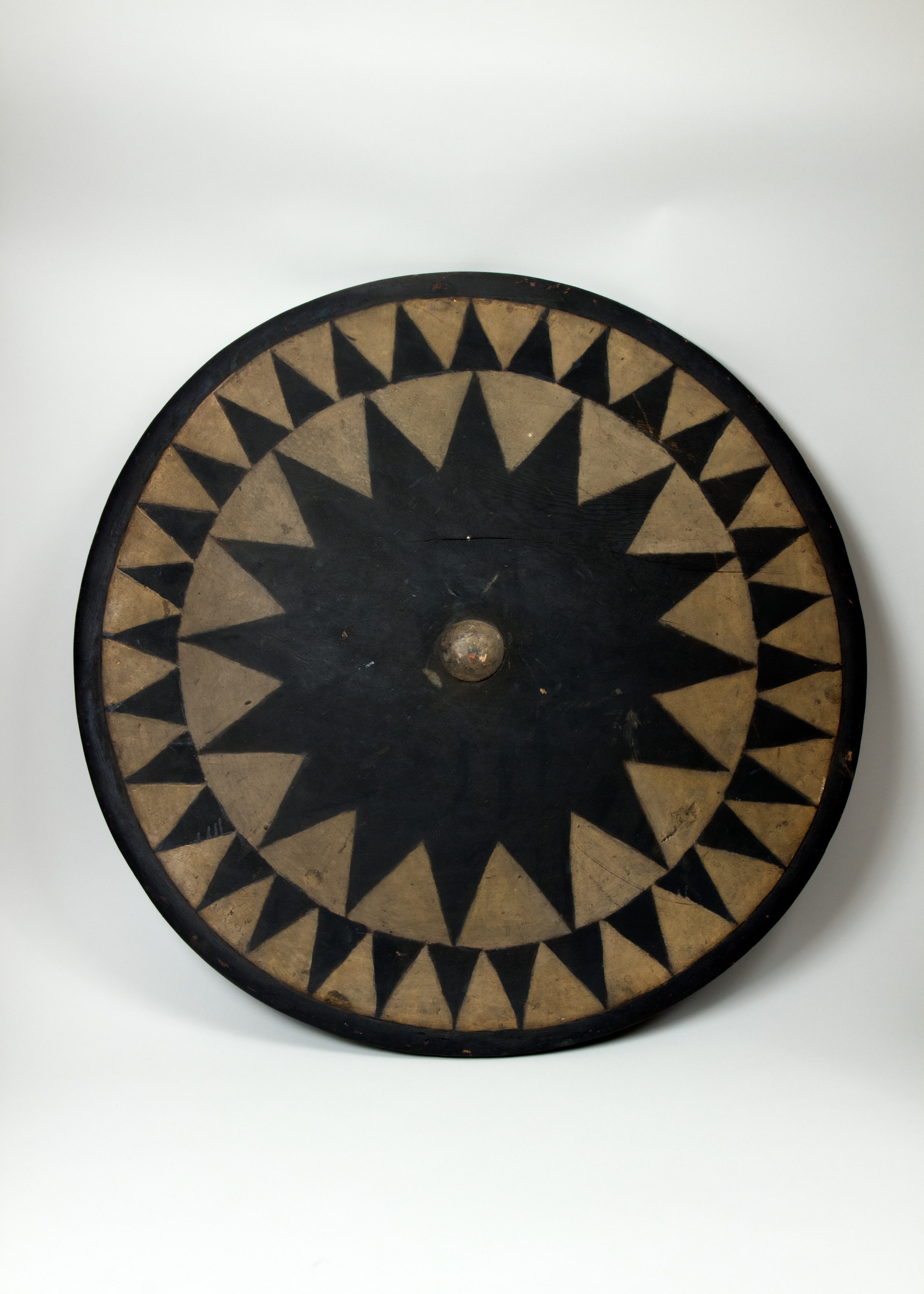
A wooden Moro taming in the Metropolitan Museum of Art, c. 18th-19th century

A taming (pronounced: tah-MING) is a round shield made of wood or tightly-woven rattan traditionally used by the Moro, Lumad, and Visayan people of the Philippines.

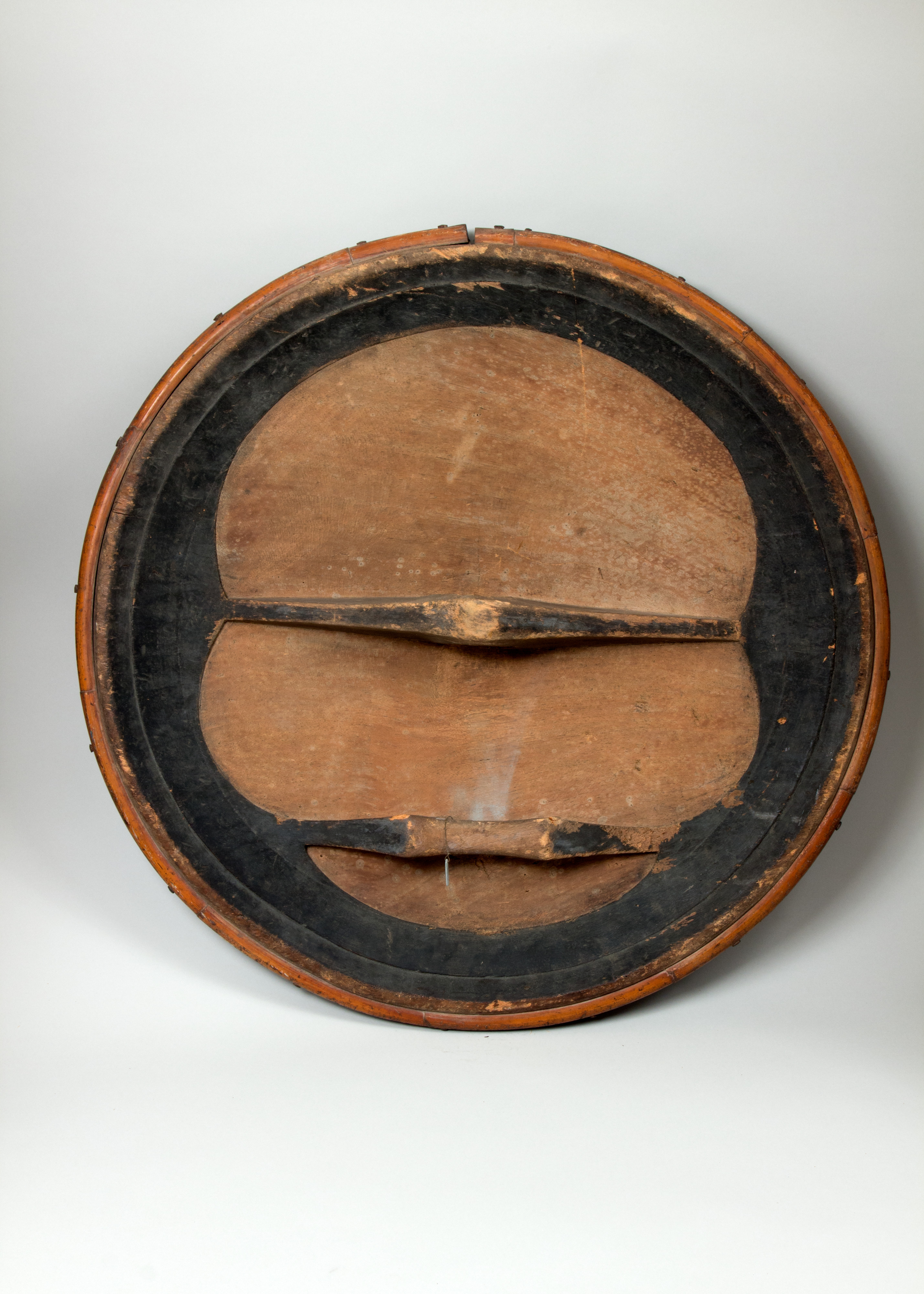
Obverse side of a wooden Moro taming in the Metropolitan Museum of Art, c. 18th-19th century

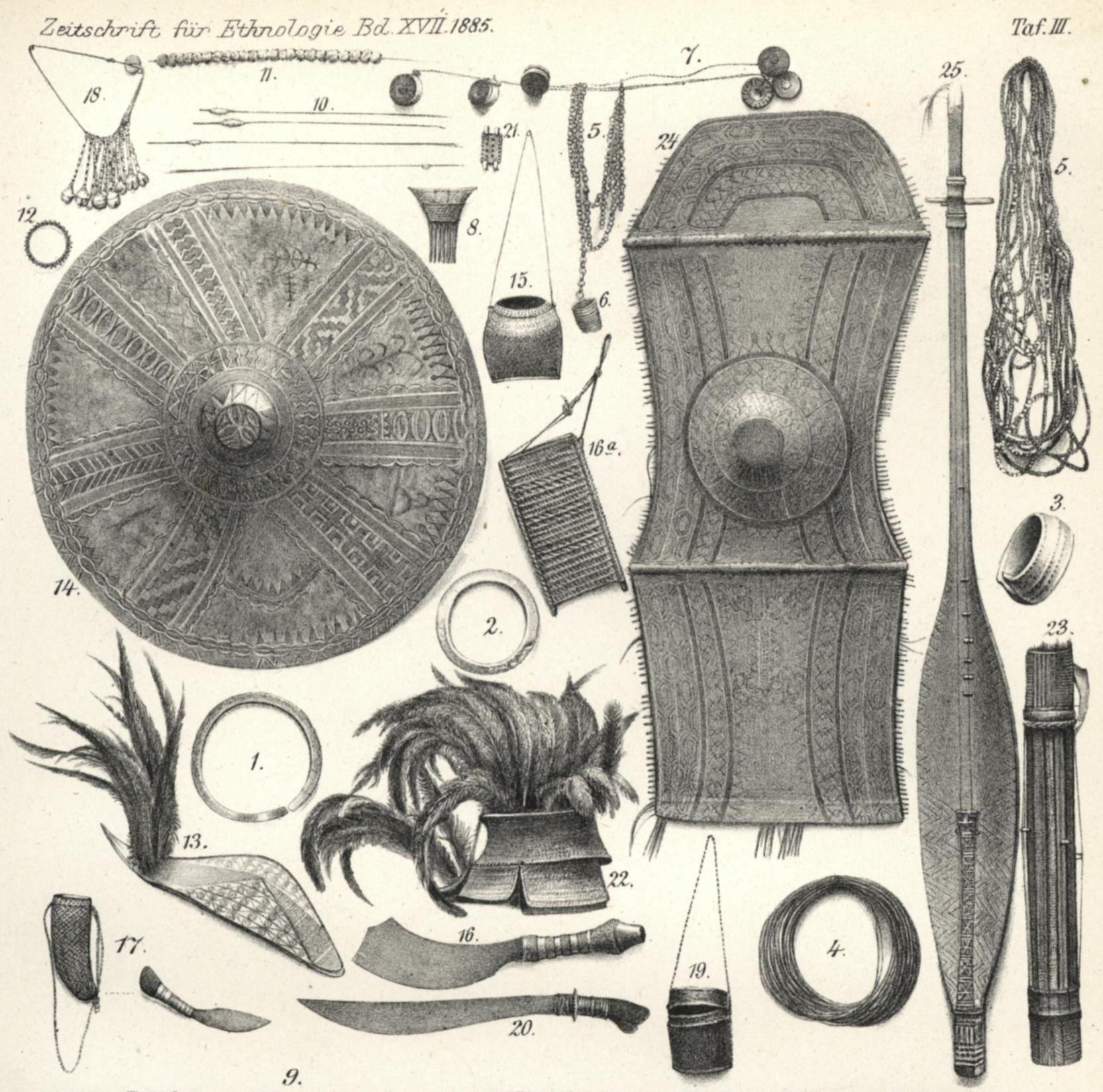
A Bagobo taming alongside a kalasag (1885)

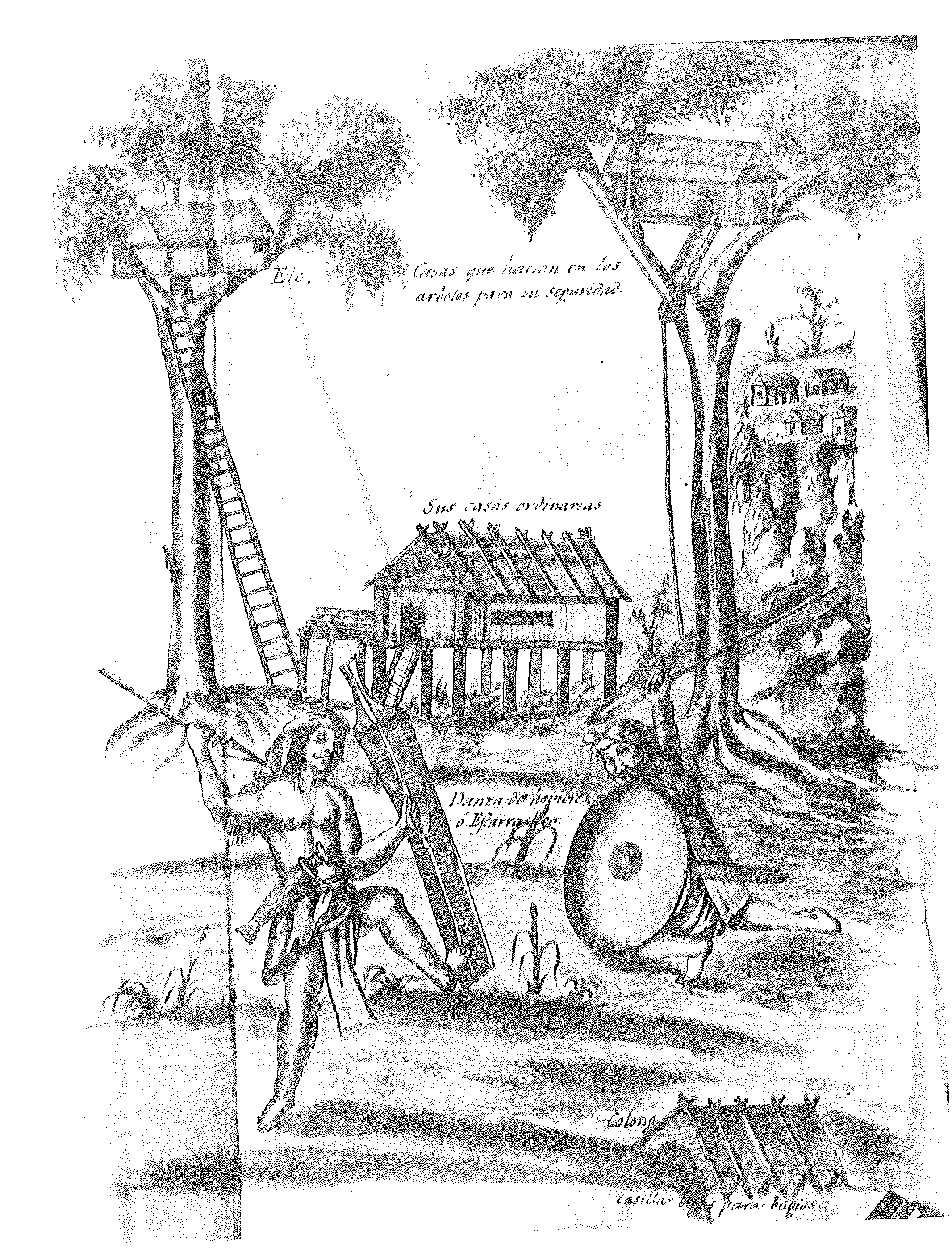
Visayan warriors with both taming and kalasag shields (c.1668)

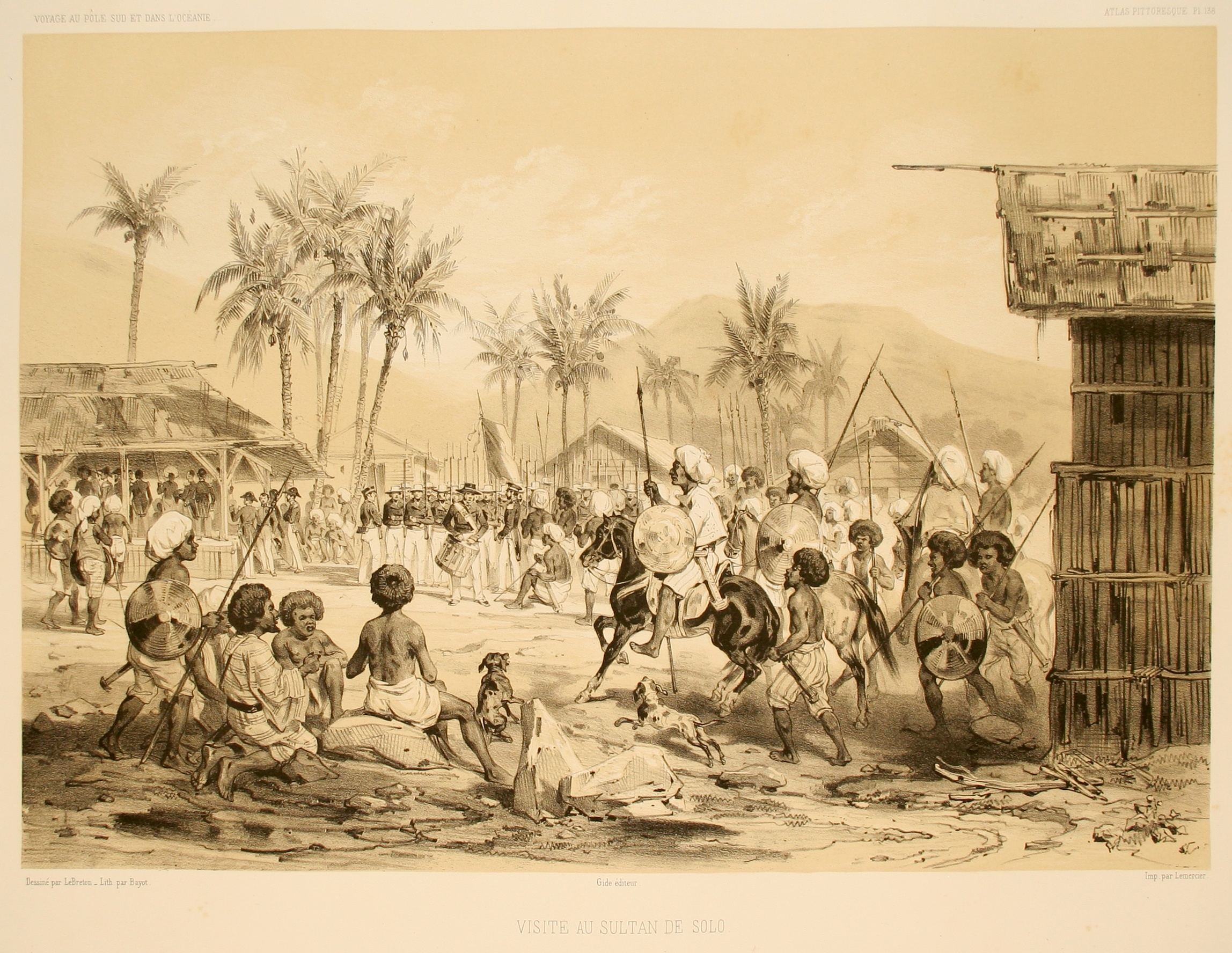
Warriors with taming during the meeting of the crew of L'Astrolabe with the Sultan of Sulu (c.1846)

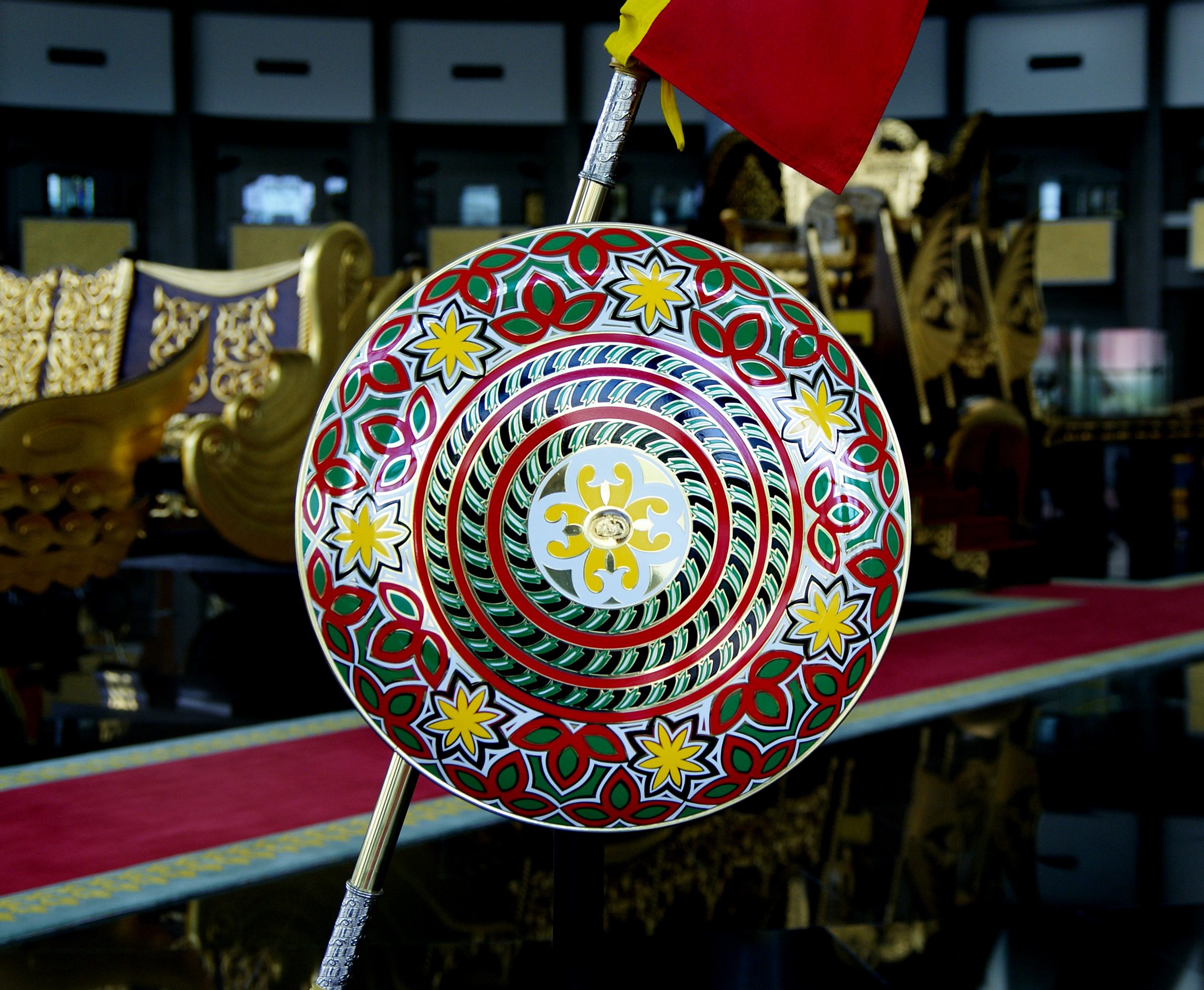
Taming, a regalia of Brunei, displayed in the Royal Regalia Museum

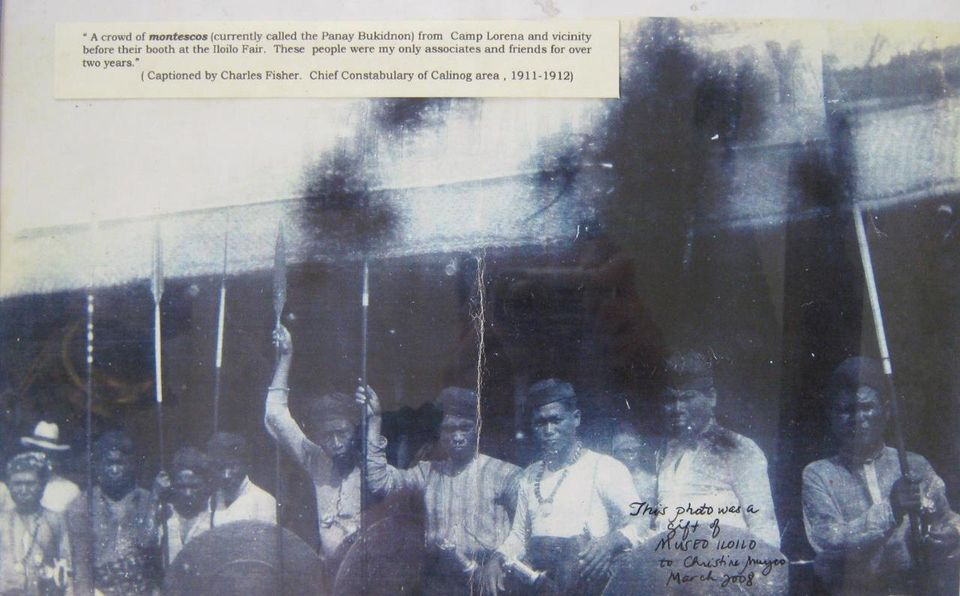
Panay Bukidnon tribesmen posing with wooden Taming shields

== See also ==
- Kalasag
