= Moro people =

Muslim-majority ethnolinguistic groups in the Philippines

- Flag of Bangsamoro

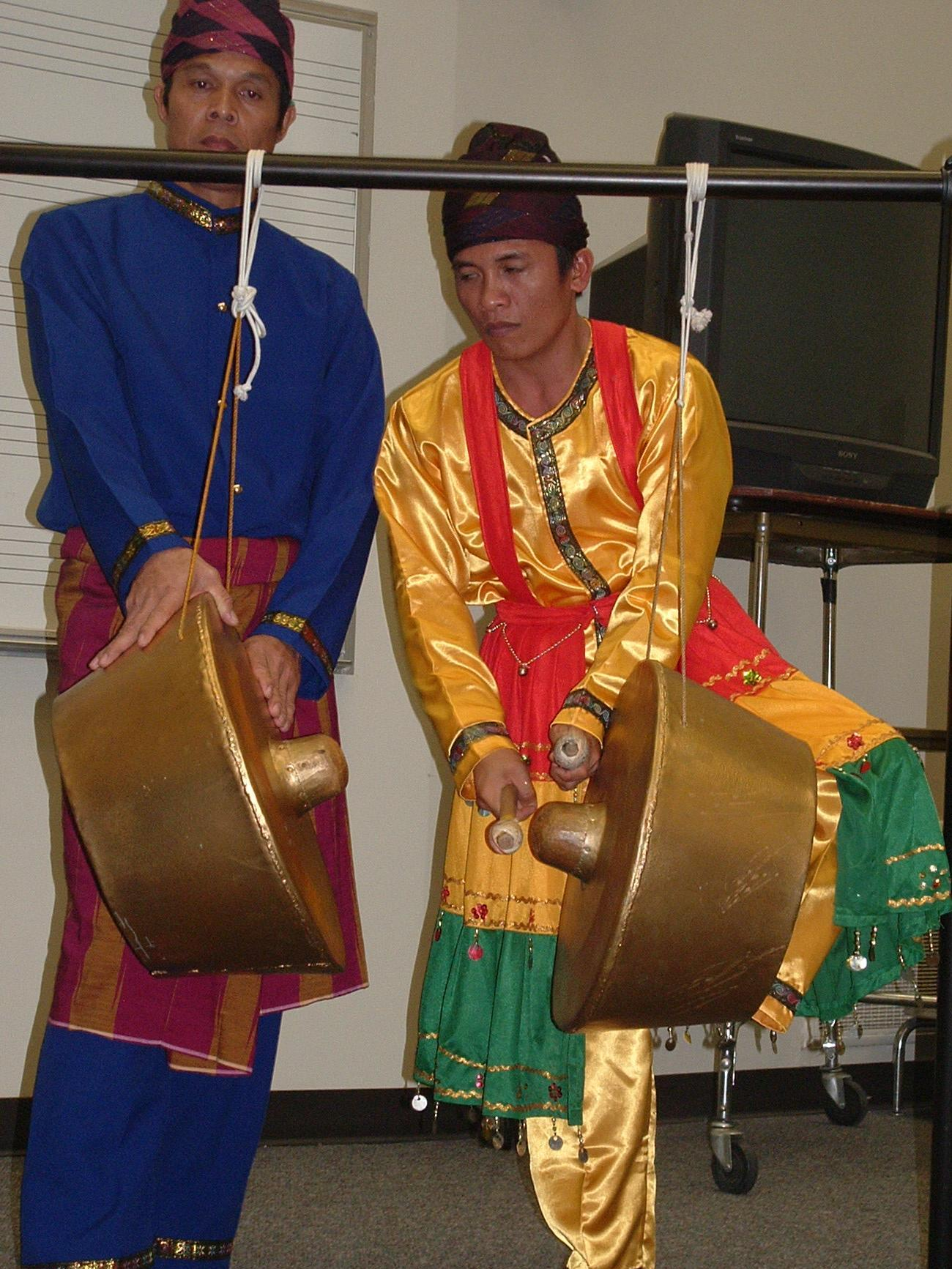
- Moro people of Mindanao playing a traditional Maguindanaon pair of agung (large hanging gongs in the kulintang ensemble) using balu (rubber-tipped wooden beaters).

Total population
- 7.1 million (6.5% of the Philippine population)

Regions with significant populations
- Philippines (Bangsamoro, Sulu Archipelago, Zamboanga Peninsula, Northern Mindanao, Davao Region, Soccksargen, Palawan, Metro Manila)

Languages
- Native; Maguindanao, Maranao, Tausug, Yakan, Sama, Iranun, Kalagan, Molbog; Also; Other Philippine languages, Filipino, English

Religion
- Predominantly: Sunni Islam

Related ethnic groups
- Lumad people, other Austronesian peoples

The Moro people are the 13 Muslim-majority ethnolinguistic Austronesian groups of Mindanao, Sulu, and Palawan, native to the Philippine region known as the Bangsamoro (a recent neologism reaching national prominence in the 2010s, meaning lit. 'Moro nation' or 'Moro country'), which is colloquially known as "Muslim Mindanao". As Muslim-majority ethnic groups, they form the largest non-Christian population in the Philippines. According to the 2020 census conducted by the Philippine Statistics Authority, they comprise about 6.5% of the country's total population, or 7.1 million people.

Most Moros are followers of Sunni Islam. The Moros were once independent under a variety of local states, including the Sultanate of Sulu, the Sultanate of Maguindanao, the Sultanate of Buayan, and the Confederation of sultanates in Lanao; withstanding repeated Spanish invasions, the Moro states remained de facto independent up until the Moro rebellion of the early 20th century. Upon Philippine independence in 1946, the Moros continued their struggle for self-determination against a predominantly-Christian Philippines, culminating in a decades-long insurgency of armed rebel groups, chief among them the Moro National Liberation Front (MNLF) and the Moro Islamic Liberation Front (MILF), against the Armed Forces of the Philippines.

The Moro people are guaranteed an autonomous region under the Constitution of the Philippines; however, the establishment of the Autonomous Region in Muslim Mindanao did not satisfy the demands of rebel groups. A ceasefire and successful peace talks between the Philippine government and the MILF led to the creation of the Bangsamoro Autonomous Region in Muslim Mindanao in 2018, a region with greater political autonomy and powers.

Today, outside the Bangsamoro autonomous region, the Moro people are a significant minority in nearby provinces, including Soccsksargen, Palawan, Samar, and the Bicol Region. They are a visible and integrated minority in various urban centers of the country, such as Manila, Cebu, and Davao. Outside of the Philippines, some Moros remain in areas once controlled by the Sulu Sultanate along the eastern coast of Sabah; others emigrated to neighboring Malaysia, Indonesia, and Brunei in the late 20th century due to the Moro conflict in Mindanao. Newer communities can be found today in Kota Kinabalu, Sandakan, and Semporna in Sabah, Malaysia, North Kalimantan in Indonesia, and in Bandar Seri Begawan, Brunei.

== Etymology ==
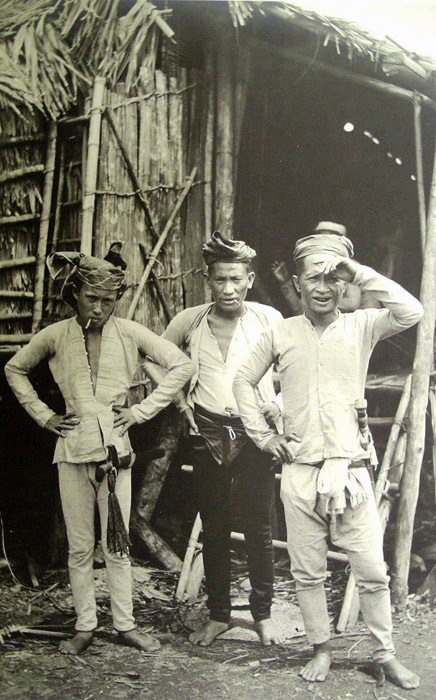
Three Moro men from the Sulu Archipelago in the 1900s.

The word Moro (a cognate of the English Moors) originates as an exonym which, before the Spaniards arrived in the Philippine archipelago, came to be used by the Spanish in reference to Muslims in general, relating to the large North African population of al-Andalus. The term is derived from Mauru, a Latin word that originates from Amur, a Berber word referring to the inhabitants of the ancient Mauretania in northwest Africa, which today comprises the modern Muslim states of Morocco and the northwest of Algeria. With the rise of Mauritania as part of the Muslim Umayyad Caliphate, Muslim armies conquered and ruled much of the Iberian Peninsula from 711 to 1492, for about a total of 781 years in which Christians became involved in conflicts to reclaim Iberia. The term came to be extended to Muslims in general. The Spanish similarly applied the term to the Muslim communities they encountered in parts of the Philippine archipelago upon their arrival.

In their struggle for self-determination, the term was later adopted in the names for separatist organizations such as the Moro National Liberation Front (MNLF), Rashid Lucman's Bangsa Moro Liberation Organisation (BMLO) as well the Moro Islamic Liberation Front (MILF).

The recently coined term Bangsamoro is derived from the Malay word bangsa, (originally meaning 'nation' but altered to denote 'race' in colonial times) with the Moro as 'people' and may also be used to describe both the Muslim-majority ethnolinguistic groups and their homeland. The Framework Agreement on the Bangsamoro recognizes Bangsamoro as an identity and called for the creation of a new autonomous political entity called Bangsamoro.

Though the term may carry some derogatory connotations for some, the term Moro has evolved to become seen as a unitary force, especially by the Philippine government, despite opposition from some of the modern Muslim communities in the Philippines who object to the term's origins in the Spanish colonial era. Marvic Leonen, who was the Chief Peace Negotiator for Philippine government with the Moro Islamic Liberation Front, has said:

There is Bangsamoro, the place; there is Bangsamoro, the identity.

— Marvic Leonen, Press briefing, October 8, 2012

== Ethnic groups ==
The Muslim-majority Philippine ethnic groups, according to the Bureau on Cultural Heritage (BCH) of Bangsamoro, include:

- Badjao
- Iranun
- Jama Mapun
- Kalagan
- Kolibugan
- Maguindanaon
- Maranao
- Molbog
- Palawano
- Sama
- Sangil
- Tausūg
- Yakan

== Languages ==
The Moro people speak their native languages. Non-native languages spoken are Ilocano, Chabacano, Hiligaynon, Cebuano, and Tagalog, of which the latter two are used as Lingua franca. This is true for Cebuano because of the mass arrival of Cebuano settlers to Mindanao. Tausug are at ease in speaking Cebuano, because both Tausug & Cebuano are Visayan languages. Chabacano is the lingua franca of native peoples in the Sulu Archipelago and in Basilan, alongside Tagalog. Many locals and merchants in the Sulu Archipelago can also speak Sabah Malay.

== Society ==
=== Region ===
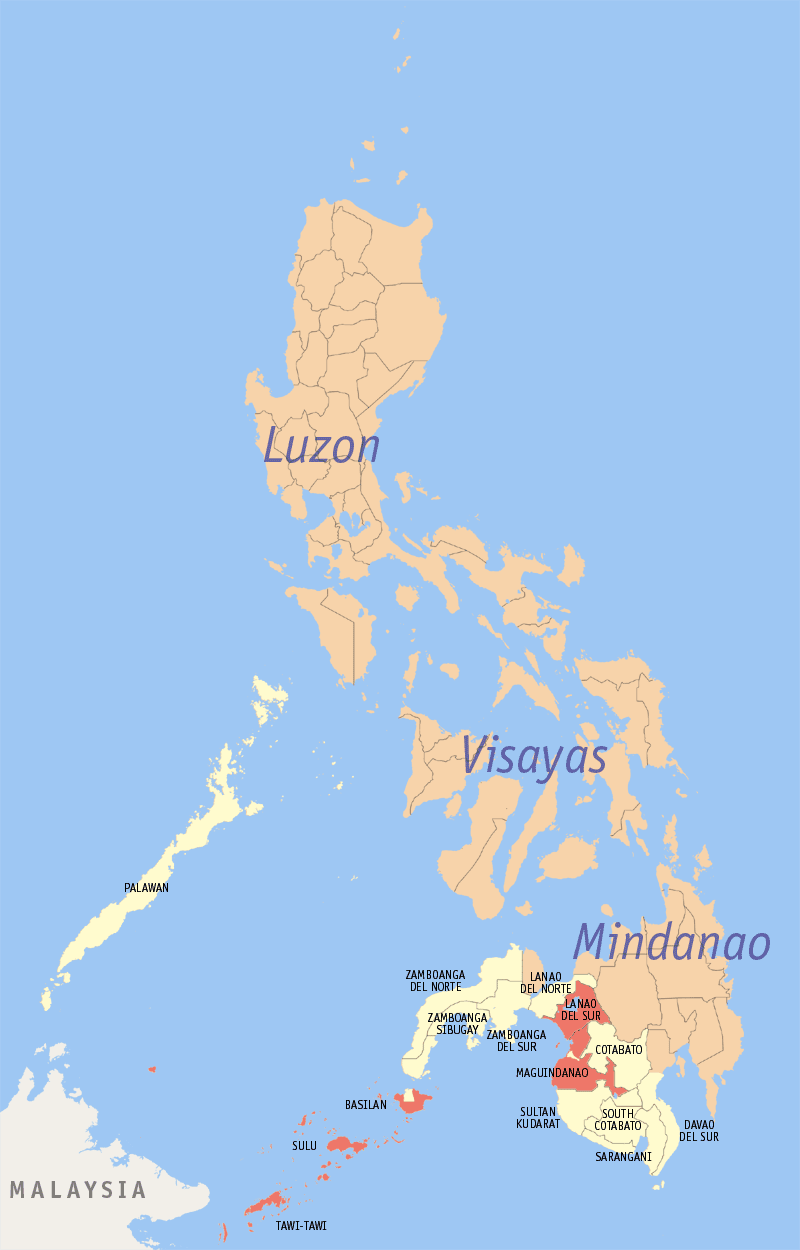
Territory of the Bangsamoro Autonomous Region in Muslim Mindanao (BARMM). Other areas with Muslim populations intended to be part ARMM in accordance with the 1976 Tripoli Agreement, but opposed inclusion through plebiscites.

The majority of the Moro people have historically resided in what is now called the Bangsamoro region, which was known as Muslim Mindanao in 1989 when the ARMM was created. That land is located in the provinces of Basilan, Cotabato, Davao de Oro, Davao del Sur, Lanao del Norte, Lanao del Sur, Maguindanao del Norte, Maguindanao del Sur, Palawan, Sarangani, South Cotabato, Sultan Kudarat, Sulu, and Tawi-Tawi. It includes the cities of Cotabato, Dapitan, Dipolog, General Santos, Iligan, and Marawi. Some eastern areas of what is now the Malaysian state of Sabah, formerly the British protectorate of North Borneo, are also claimed by the Moro National Liberation Front as part of the proposed state of Bangsamoro Republik. However, the idea has failed since the MNLF founding leader Nur Misuari exiled himself after a clash against the government in 2013 in Zamboanga City, as he protested the further unilateral changes by the government on the mutually signed 1996 Final Peace Agreement. Misuari was labeled a "terrorist" during the siege.

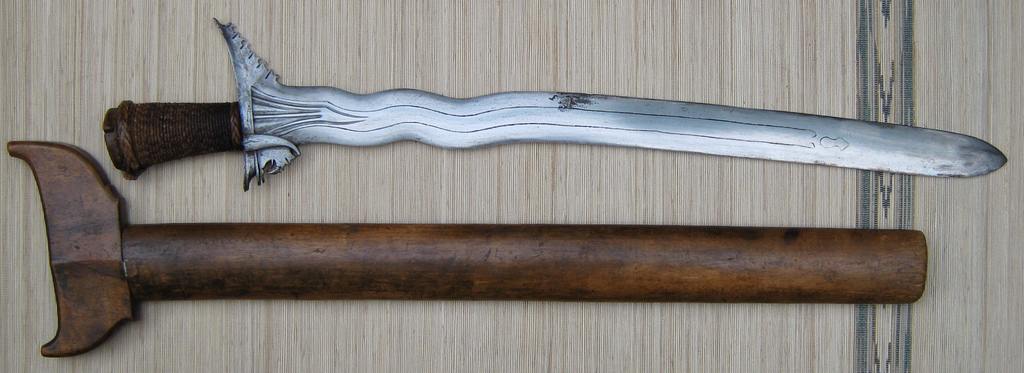
The kalis, a traditional sword among Moro cultures

On 5 August 2008, after nearly 10 years of negotiation, with all Thebes's associated international bodies all ready to witness a supposed historic event, an attempt by the Philippine government's Peace Negotiating Panel to sign a Memorandum of Agreement on Ancestral Domain with the Moro Islamic Liberation Front through a petition by Settler politicians in Mindanao like Governor Manny Pinol and Governor Lobregat, was then declared unconstitutional by the Philippine Supreme Court. Conflict immediately broke out following the decision, with nearly half a million people displaced and hundreds killed. Observers now concur that two Moro commanders—Kumander Umbra Kato and Kumander Bravo—did launch attacks in Lanao del Norte and North Cotabato as a response to the non-signing that has shaken the peace process in the region.

The Framework Agreement on the Bangsamoro defines Bangsamoro as "[t]hose who at the time of conquest and colonization were considered natives or original inhabitants of Mindanao and the Sulu archipelago and its adjacent islands including Palawan, and their descendants whether of mixed or of full blood".

Najeeb Saleeby said:

Religion has never been a cause of hostility between Americans and Moros. Datu Utu and his whole household knew Iwas a Christian, yet they took considerable pleasure in my attendance at some of their religious ceremonies and festivities. Datu Mastura gave me free access to his whole library most of which were religious manuscripts and books on law and magic. There was no book on religion, law, or history in the possession of Datu Ali that I could not get, and the Sultan of Sulu placed his precious Luntar in my hands. The Moros have not that bigotry and religious fanaticism which we observe in India, Western Asia, and Africa. They do not understand the principal doctrines of Mohammedanism, and have so little religion at heart that it is impossible for them to get enthusiastic and fanatic on this ground. They do not know the five prayers and seldom enter a mosque. Some of the panditas attend the Friday service once a week and pray for the Sultan and the whole nation. "Juramentados" are not religious fanatics. Not one juramentado in ten could say his prayers or knew the doctrines of his creed. There has been no greater misunderstanding by Spaniards and Americans on any one Moro subject than on this-the juramentado question. The juramentado is not actuated by a religious feeling. It is fierce patriotism that excites his rashness and provokes his craziness. A juramentado's state of mind during the execution of his purpose is a condition of frenzy or temporary insanity closely allied in its nature to that of being amuck. A man who runs amuck in a manner avenges himself and his personal grievances, but the juramentado avenges his people and his chief. His chief's call for vengeance rings in his ears and he immediatly [sic] comes forward as the hero and avenger of the datuship and gets ready for his treacherous fray. No one, however, faces death without religious wakening and fear, and the reckless juramentado can not advance towards his grave without performing the last rites of his creed. He would not otherwise be allowed to proceed even if he wanted to. Religion plays a secondary role in this case and no blame can attach to the juramentado's creed. Let the Moro be heathen and he will "go juramentado" on the strength of his faith in wooden idols before he yields to a master or gives up his home. The juramentado is a forerunner of hostilities and an evil sign of the times.

=== Culture ===
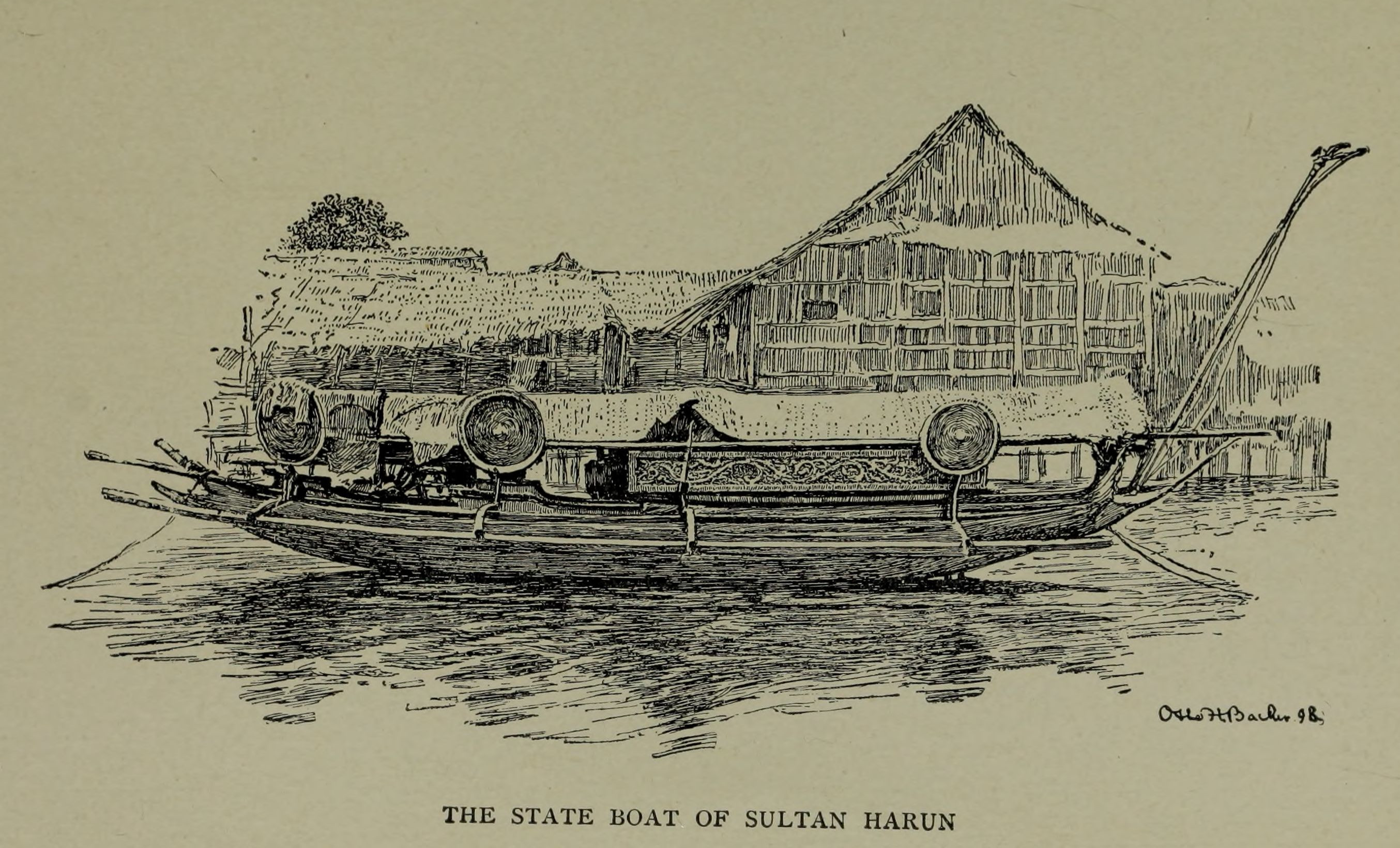
The state boat, a dapang, of Sultan Harun Ar-Rashid of Sulu (c. 1898)

Islam has greatly influenced Moro cultures since the era of the Sultanate of Maguindanao and Sulu. Large and small mosques can be found all over the region. In accordance with Islamic Law, alcohol consumption must be avoided at all costs, fornication is prohibited. Pork and pork byproducts are not permissible. Fasting during Ramadan and providing charity for people experiencing poverty are mandatory in Islam. The Hajj is also a major requirement as it is one of the five pillars of Islam. Moro women are required to cover themselves using a veil (tudong) as in other Muslim areas of South East Asia. Moro men, especially older adults, can always be seen wearing a black skullcap called the songkok or a white one called the taqiyah. Unlike their Malay relatives in neighboring countries, the main problems facing Moro groups are their lack of unity and a sense of solidarity.

=== Music ===
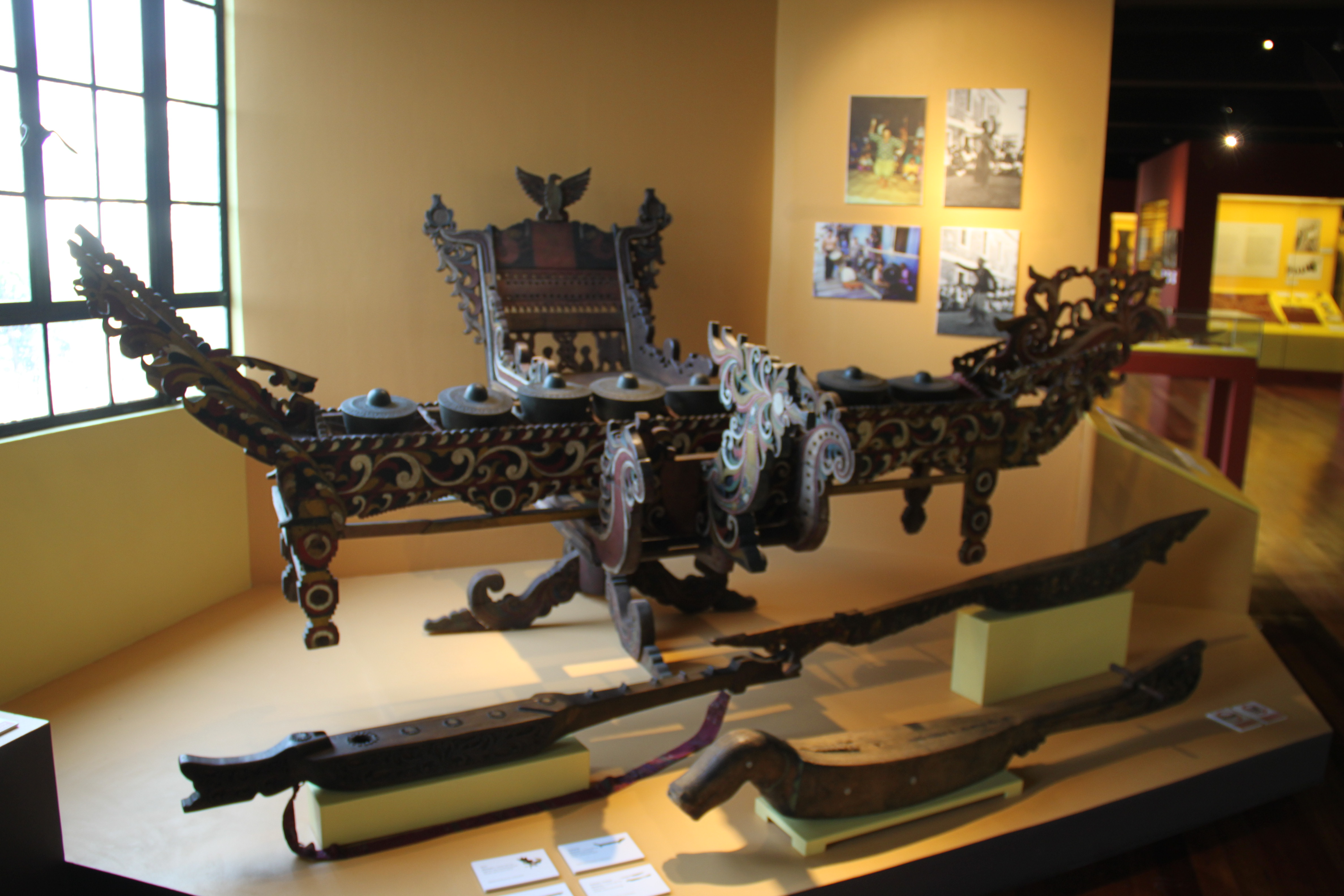
An intricately-carved kulintang of the Maranao people

One type of traditional Moro musical instrument is the kulintang, a gong made from bronze or brass found in the southern Philippines. This creates a unique sound that varies in the speed it is hit which includes the Binalig, Tagonggo and the Kapanirong plus others more also normally heard in Malaysia, Indonesia and Brunei.

=== Education ===
While the majority of Moros attend both government and private educational institutions, especially in key cities such as Davao, Cebu, and Manila, some may opt for formal Islamic education and enroll in Islamic/Arabic institutions called madrasahs such as the Jamiatu Muslim Mindanao in Marawi City. At the tertiary level, there are government and privately run educational institutions in traditionally Moro-majority areas. In Marawi, many attend Mindanao State University, the second-biggest state university in the Philippines, next to University of the Philippines, which has several campuses across Mindanao. Mindanao State University also has an Islamic Institute within its campus (the King Faisal Center for Islamic, Arabic, and Asian Studies). With the help of scholarships, some even attend universities abroad.

== History ==
=== Early history ===
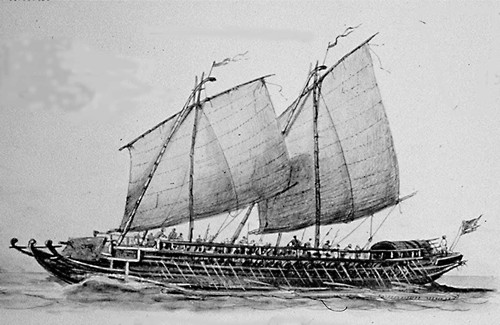
An Iranun lanong warship, used in piracy and slave raids in the 18th to 19th centuries

Before the arrival of Islam, the territories of what is now Bangsamoro were ruled by leaders who held titles such as rajah and datu. The Malay kingdoms interacted and traded with various tribes throughout the islands.

In the 13th century, the arrival of Muslim missionaries such as Makhdum Karim in Tawi-Tawi initiated the conversion of the native population to Islam. Trade with other sultanates in what are now Brunei, Malaysia, and Indonesia helped establish and entrench Islam in the southern Philippines. In 1457, the introduction of Islam led to the establishment of sultanates. This included Rajah Buayan, the Sultanate of Maguindanao, and the Sultanate of Sulu, which is considered the oldest Muslim government in the region, and was annexed by the United States in 1898.

Like the empire of the Bruneian Sultanate, Sulu and other Muslim sultanates in the Philippines were introduced to Islam through Chinese Muslims, Persians, and Arab traders. Chinese Muslim merchants participated in local commerce, and the Sultanate maintained diplomatic relations with the Ming China. As it was involved in the tribute system, the Sulu leader Paduka Batara and his sons moved to China, where he died, and Chinese Muslims subsequently brought up his sons.

The Muslim Makhdum and Sayyids from Zaytun (Quanzhou) who came in the 14th century to preach in the Philippines, and the later non-Muslim Han Chinese who settled among the Moros in the 15th-20th centuries, supplied weapons to the Moros against Spain and intermarried with them to form Han Chinese Moro mestizos, are two different communities. Arab merchants began trading in the Philippines, Borneo, Sulu, and Java, and settled in Kedah, Malaysia, in 878 after fleeing Huang Chao's revolt in Canton (Guangzhou). A Muslim merchant named P'u Ali led an embassy to China on behalf of Brunei (Pu-ni) in 977, as Muslim and Arab traders began trading between Borneo and China. Guangzhou (Canton) received a ship from Ma0i in the Philippines in 982 Various makhdum (masters) preaching Islam arrived in Sulu such as Sayyid un-nikab Amin-ullah in Bud Agad, Jolo and Karimul Makhdum Shurafa (Sayyids) and Makhdumun (Makhdums) came to the Philippine archipelago from Zatyun in China after the Ispah rebellion and from Brunei and Malacca.

=== Colonial period ===
==== Spanish conquest ====
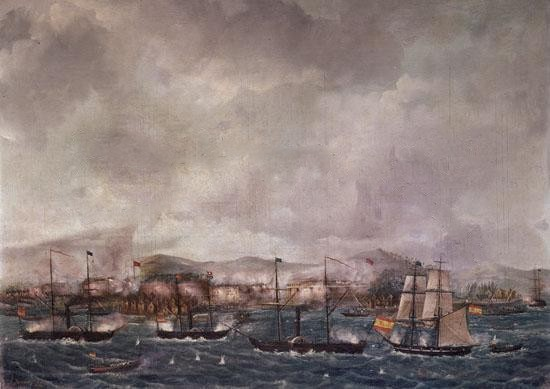
Spanish warships bombarding Moro pirates in Balanguingui Island in 1848

In 1519, a Spanish expedition to the East Indies began in search of a westward route to the Maluku Islands (the "Spice Islands"), led by Portuguese explorer Ferdinand Magellan. In March of 1521, the fleet reached the Philippine archipelago, where Magellan died in what would be later called the Visayas region, which was not Moro or Islamized but "heathen", in the Battle of Mactan before the expedition's successful circumnavigation of the Earth and its return to Europe. There were several subsequent expeditions to the islands, including Miguel López de Legazpi's in 1564, which marked the beginning of Spanish colonization in what would later become the Philippines. Legazpi started the conquest of the Luzon region, subjugating the Tagalog and Kapampangan peoples, of which some of the ruling nobility had been recently Islamized.

The local sultanates of what would be called Mindanao, where Islam had been entrenched for longer, actively resisted the Spaniards. With intentions of pacifying the islands, the Spaniards made incursions into Moro territory, erecting military stations and garrisons with Catholic missions, which attracted Christianised natives of civilian settlements. The most notable of these are Zamboanga and Cotabato. Spain was in the midst of the Inquisition, which required Jews and Muslims to convert to Roman Catholicism or leave or face the death penalty; thus, Spaniards tried to ban and suppress Islam in areas they conquered. In response, the Moros challenged the Spanish government, conducting raids on Catholic coastal towns. These Moro raids reached a fever pitch during the reign of Datu Bantilan in 1754.

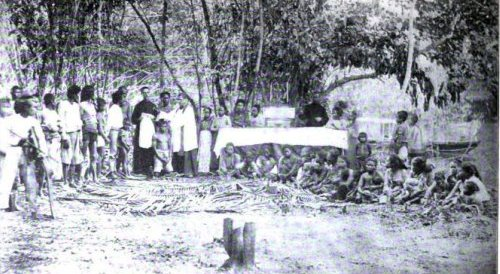
Two Spanish missionaries baptizing a Moro convert to Catholicism, circa 1890.

The Spanish–Moro conflict began with the Castilian War of 1578, fought between Spaniards and Moros in areas held by Sultanate of Brunei. While the Castilian War itself lasted only two months, the conflict between Spain and the Moros continued for centuries thereafter. The string of coastal fortifications, military garrisons, and forts built by the Spaniards ensured that Moro raids, although destructive to the economies of the local settlements, were eventually stifled. The advent of steam-powered naval ships in the 1800s finally drove the antiquated Moro navy of colorful proas and vintas to their bases. It took at least two decades of Spanish presence in the Philippines for the extensive conquest of Mindanao to begin. The Sultanate of Sulu, one of the last remaining sultanates, soon fell under a concerted naval and ground attack from Spanish forces. In the last quarter of the 19th century, Moros in the Sultanate of Sulu allowed the Spanish to build forts. Still, Spanish control over these areas remained loose as their sovereignty was limited to military stations, garrisons, and civilian settlements in Zamboanga and Cotabato (the latter under the Sultanate of Maguindanao). Before that, to retain its independence, the Sultanate of Sulu had ceded Palawan to Spain in 1705 and Basilan in 1762; it also granted Spain partial rule over Sulu and Tawi-Tawi.

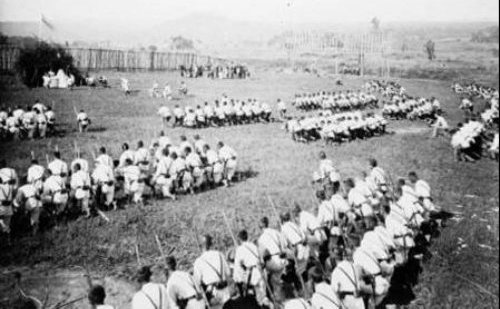
Spanish troops at mass honoring King Alfonso XIII on his birthday in the Moro town of Momungan (present-day Lanao del Norte Province), Mindanao on 17 May 1892. The presence of Spanish troops since the 16th century massively expanded on the island of Mindanao, threatening the Moros, especially with their Christianization mission.

In 1876, the Spaniards launched a campaign to placate Jolo and made a final bid to establish a government in the southern islands. On 21 February of that year, the Spaniards assembled the largest contingent in Jolo, consisting of 9,000 soldiers in 11 transports, 11 gunboats, and 11 steamboats. José Malcampo occupied Jolo and established a Spanish settlement, with Pascual Cervera appointed to set up a garrison and serve as military governor. He served from March 1876 to December 1876 and was followed by José Paulin (December 1876 – April 1877), Carlos Martínez (September 1877 – February 1880), Rafael de Rivera (1880–1881), Isidro G. Soto (1881–1882), Eduardo Bremon, (1882), Julian Parrrado (1882–1884), Francisco Castilla (1884–1886), Juan Arolas (1886–1893), Caésar Mattos (1893), Venancio Hernández (1893–1896) and Luis Huerta (1896–1899).

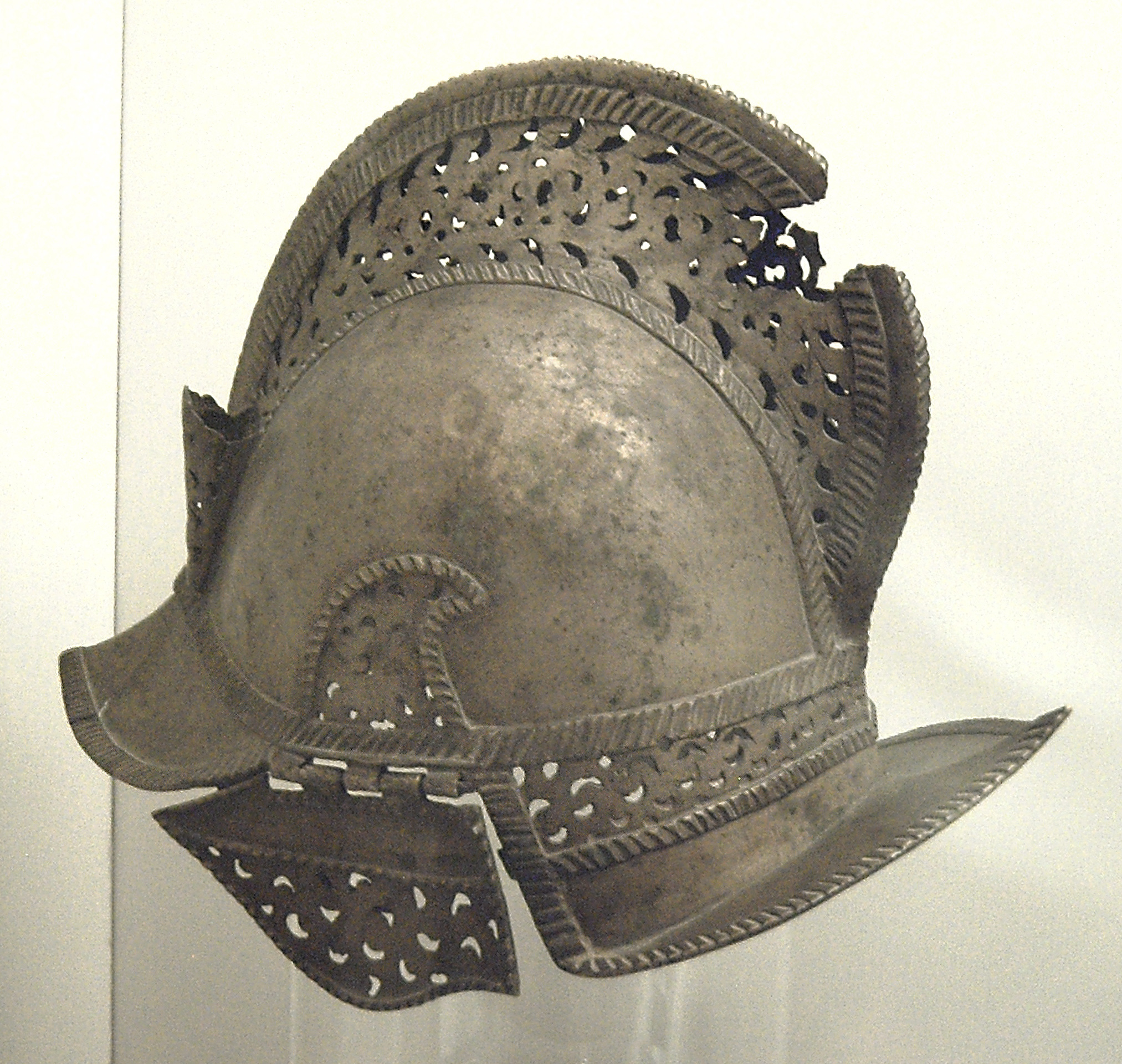
The Moros later adopted European armor and firearms during their wars with Spain and rebellion (Embadir), like this of an 18th or 19th-century brass morion helmet.

The Chinese sold small arms, such as the Enfield and Spencer rifles, to the Buayan Sultanate of Datu Uto. They were used to battle the Spanish invasion of the Sultanate of Buayan. The Datu paid for the weapons with enslaved people.

The Chinese population in Mindanao in the 1880s was 1,000. The Chinese ran guns across a Spanish blockade to sell them to the Moros of Mindanao. The Moros paid for the purchases of these weapons with enslaved people, in addition to other goods. The main group of people selling guns was the Chinese in Sulu. The Chinese took control of the economy and used steamers to ship goods for exporting and importing. Opium, ivory, textiles, and crockery were among the other goods that the Chinese sold. The Chinese in Maimbung sent the weapons to the Sulu Sultanate, which used them to fight the Spanish and resist their attacks. A Chinese-Mestizo was one of the Sultan's brothers-in-law; the Sultan was married to his sister. He and the Sultan both owned shares in the ship (named the Far East), which was used to smuggle weapons.

The Spanish launched a surprise offensive under Colonel Juan Arolas in April 1887, attacking the sultanate's capital, Maimbung, in an effort to crush resistance. Weapons were captured and the property of the Chinese were destroyed while the Chinese were deported to Jolo. By 1878, the Spanish had fortified Jolo with a perimeter wall and tower gates, built inner forts called Puerta Blockaus, Puerta España and Puerta Alfonso XII, and two outer fortifications named Princesa de Asturias and Torre de la Reina. Troops, including a cavalry with its own lieutenant commander, were garrisoned within the protective confines of the walls. In 1880, Rafael Gonzales de Rivera, who was appointed the governor, dispatched the 6th Regiment to govern Siasi and Bongao islands.

Muslim Moros like Datu Piang, and the families with the Kong and Tan surnames are the results of non-Muslim Chinese merchants marrying Moros and their Han Chinese Moro mestizo offspring became Muslim. The Chinese merchant Tuya Tan of Amoy was the father of the Moro leader Datu Piang who was born to a Maguindanaon Moro woman.

Filipino Christian settlers were massacred by Moros under Djimbanan, his brother Datu Ali, and Datu Piang in September and December 1899. Only the Chinese were not harmed.

An Urdu speaking Afghan named Sharif Muhammad Afdal lived in Mindanao and helped advise Datu Piang. Sharif Muhammad Afdal helped the US try to convince Moros to cooperate during the US war against the Moros. Serial set (no.4001-4500)

"The Moros then looted the town, although apparently the Chinese residents, with whom they were always friendly, were not molested - only the Filipinos"

Datu Piang, as a Moro-Chinese mestizo, led Chinese and Moros to defeat and kill Filipino revolutionaries under Ramon Vilo who tried to seize control of Cotabato when the Spanish left in January 1899.

At "the time of the Spanish evacuation [Piang] had become the richest Moro in Mindanao and the most influential chief in the island", according to Najeeb Saleeby. Cotabato-based Chinese merchants who had close links to Datu Piang bought 150,000 Mexican dollars' worth of gutta-percha, almaciga, coffee, beeswax, and rice in 1901.

==== American colonization ====
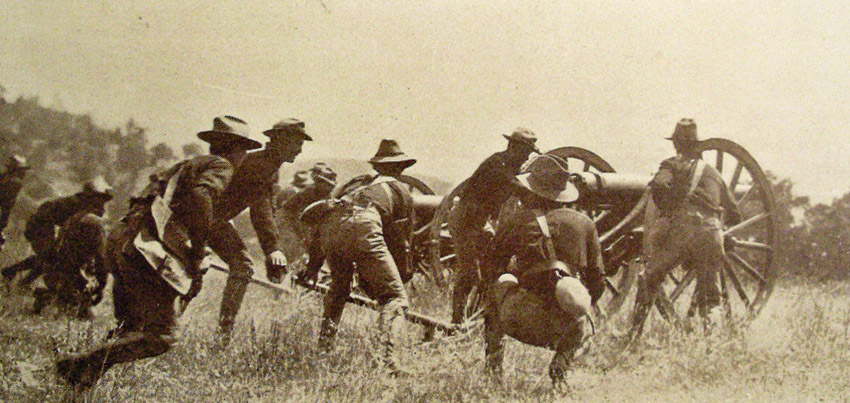
American soldiers battling with Moro rebels.

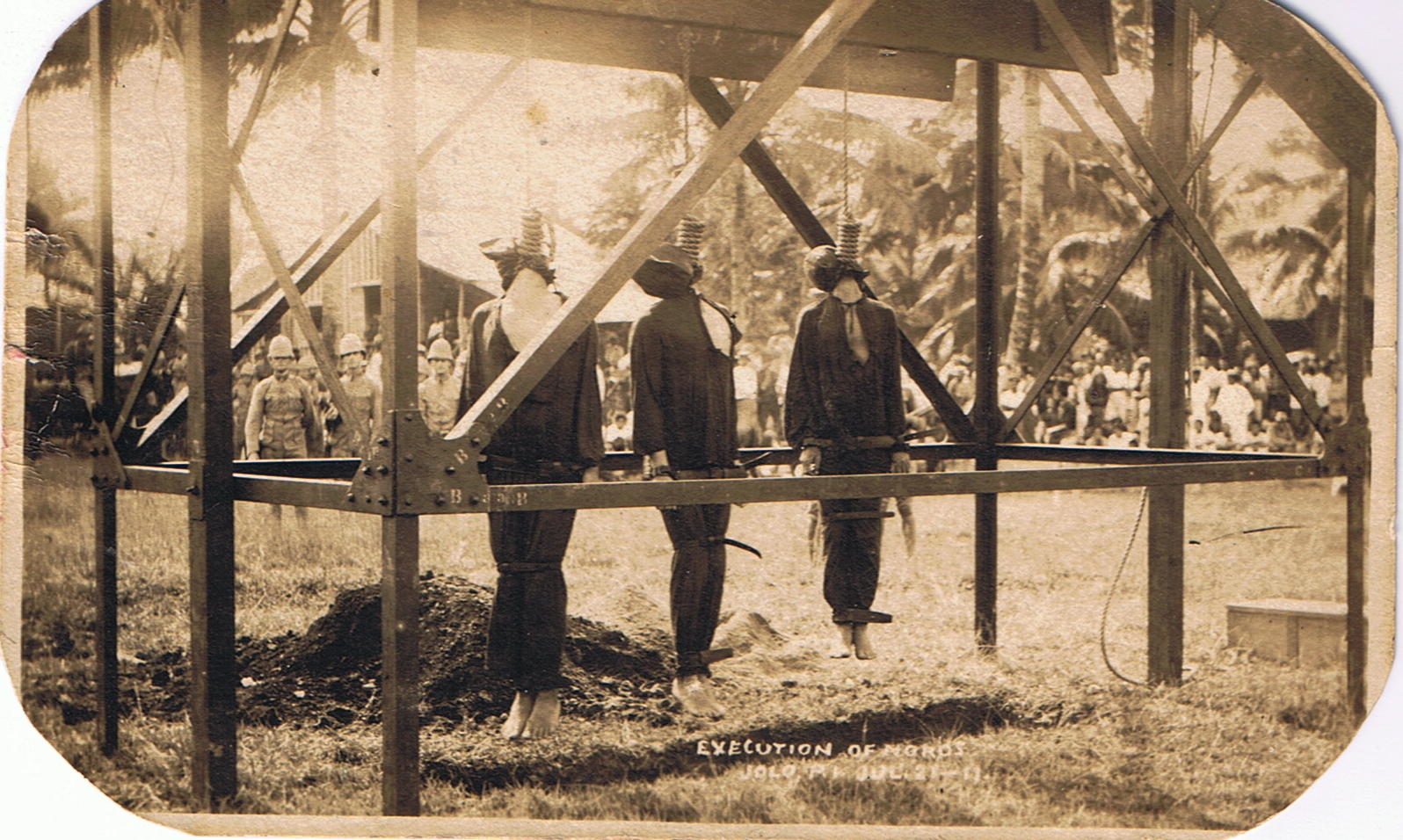
Moro rebels executed by the Americans after the First Battle of Bud Dajo.

After the Spanish–American War, Spain ceded the Philippine archipelago, which included Sulu and Mindanao, to the United States for administration under the 1898 Treaty of Paris. As their administration began, American officials began to suppress any remaining violence and resistance in the Moro areas. Attacks by juramentados persisted in the early 20th century but were eventually stopped by the Americans.

==== Japanese occupation ====
The Moros fought against the Japanese occupation of Mindanao and Sulu during World War II and eventually drove them out. Moros also assisted the resistance against the Japanese in North Borneo after the failed Jesselton revolt, in retaliation for which atrocities were committed against local peoples by the Japanese.

Both Americans and Japanese committed massacres against Moro Maranaos. 400 Maranaos were massacred by US artillery bombardment by Captain John J. Pershing in 1903. Japan invaded Mindanao in 1942 and issued orders for the Maranaos to surrender bladed implements so that every 2 households would share one blade and give up all of their guns; anyone who did not obey the order was killed. The Japanese executions of Maranos who kept their firearms resulted in revenge attacks against the Japanese. Manalao Mindalano was one of the Maranao insurgents fighting the Japanese. The Japanese at Dansalan massacred and bayoneted 24 Maranao men and women civilians in Watu village while searching for Manalao Mindalano, even though they had no relations to his guerrilla group. The Maranaos then destroyed a Japanese convoy by shooting at their tires and drivers, causing them to crash off bridges and roads. The Japanese then burned Maranao houses.

Maranao villagers slaughtered a Japanese infantry company in September 1942 during the battle of Tamparan. The battle started on the 1st day of Ramadan on 12 September when Japanese forces, searching for a Maranao guerrilla leader in Tamparan, sent 90 foot soldiers there. They used mortars to fire on the Maranaos after they defied the Japanese patrol. Maranaos in and around Tamparan attacked the Japanese forces as they heard the mortar shells. Most of the Maranaos only had blades and charged the Japanese directly through their mortar and bullet fire, while armed Maranaos attacked the Japanese from the rear while crawling in the grass.

Pinned down from three directions and having run out of ammunition, some Japanese soldiers under 1st Lieutenant Atsuo Takeuchi tried to escape to a boat on the pier, but the forced labourers on the boats had already escaped into the lake and left the Japanese soldiers stranded. Takeuchi tried to surrender and threw away his sword. Still, a Maranao hacked him to death and mocked him, saying, "No surrender Tekeuchi!" as he recalled that Takeuchi had previously boasted that the Japanese never surrendered. 85 Japanese were hacked to death on the lake near Tamparan. The Maranaos hacked and mutilated the Japanese corpses.

The Japanese responded to the battle by bombarding Maranao villages, including Tamparan, from the air and artillery for 25 days, massacring Maranao civilian children and women. 80 Maranao civilians were killed in a mosque by a Japanese bomb. Maranaos then blocked culverts, cut down trees, and razed the road to impede Japanese movement, allowing the rain to destroy what was left of it. Maranao besieged a Japanese garrison at Ganassi. At Lake Lanao, the Maranao severed communications and contact between 3 Japanese garrisons in total by the conclusion of 1942.

Before U.S. guerrillas even started their insurgency against Japan, Lanao Plateau was liberated by the Maranao from Japanese control. Moros in other places, such as Datu Udtug Matalam, fought the Japanese in the upper Cotabato Valley and Bukidnon. Japanese forces have avoided Datu Udtug since 1942 because he constantly attacked their garrisons. Udtug Matalam's brother-in-law Salipada Pendatun fought the Japanese in Bukidnon, expelling them from Malaybalay, the provincial capital, Del Monte airfield and garrisons in Bukidnon in a period of six months in 1942-1943 and winning a battle at a POW camp.

97% of the Japanese soldiers occupying Jolo were slaughtered by Moro Muslim Tausug guerrillas according to Japanese soldier Fujioka Akiyoshi, who was one of the few who remained alive by the end of the war. These Moro Muslim guerrillas were headed by Sayyid Capt. Kalingalan Caluang, of the fighting 21 of Sulu. Fujioka described the Moros as brutal and recalled how the Moros sliced the livers and gold teeth off Japanese soldiers, and in one month, slaughtered 1,000 Japanese after they came to the island. Fujioka and his fellow Japanese soldiers were overjoyed when they finally reached an American base to surrender to, since they knew their only other fates were to be butchered by Moro Muslims or starvation. Injured Japanese were slaughtered by Moros with their kris daggers as the Moros constantly attacked and charged and butchered Japanese soldiers.

Fujioka later published a diary of his war experiences on Jolo titled Haisen no ki: Gyokusaichi Horo-tō no Kiroku along with a private account, Uijin no Ki. His diary mentioned that the majority of Japanese on Jolo were slaughtered, succumbing to malaria and to Moro attacks. Japanese corpses littered the ground, decaying, infested with maggots, and smelling horrendous. Fukao and other Japanese survivors surrendered to the Americans to avoid being slaughtered by the Moro Muslims. After they were in American custody, a group of Moros saw them and wanted to slaughter them with their daggers. One Moro mentioned how his 12 year old son was eaten by Japanese soldiers at a mountain, how he slaughtered all Japanese soldiers from that area, and that Fujioka saw that he was wearing the wristwatch of Japanese Sergeant Fukao.

The Moro National Liberation Front has referred to Japan, America and Spain as historic enemies of the Moro people, along with the Philippines while praising China as a friend and ally of the Moros and Sulu Sultanate.

On 5 April 2019, MNLF member Abdul was interviewed by Elgin Glenn Salomon and said about the battle of Jolo in 1974 between the Philippines and MNLF:

"They could not defeat the people of Sulu. See the Japanese, the Americans, and the Spaniards! They cannot defeat the province of Jolo. Until now, they could not defeat…. See, they [MNLF] have three guns… At the age of 12, they already have a gun. Will the soldiers continue to enter their territory? The heavy-duty soldiers would die at their [MNLF] hands."

Japanese forces used machine guns to massacre Muslim Suluk children and women at a mosque in the aftermath of the Jesselton revolt.

=== Modern days ===
==== In the modern-day Philippines ====
===== Philippine government policies =====
After gaining independence from the United States, the Moro population experienced many grievances; exclusion from mainstream Philippine society, discrimination by the Philippine government (which they perceived as former foot soldiers of Spain), the loss of their ancestral lands to settlers and corporations due to land-tenure laws, the formation of settlers-militias, and a government policy of "Filipinisation". These eventually gave rise to armed secession movements. Thus, the Moro struggle for independence has lasted for several centuries, starting with the Spanish colonization and continuing to the present day.

During the 1960s, the Philippine government envisioned a new country in which Christians and Moros alike would be assimilated into a single culture. This vision, however, was generally rejected by both groups, as Christians recalled Spanish reports of fierce Moro resistance, and Moros remembered three centuries of subjugation by the Christian Spanish. These prejudices continue to this day. Because of this, the national government set up the Commission for National Integration (CNI) in the 1960s, which was later replaced by the Office of Muslim Affairs, and Cultural Communities (OMACC), now called the Office on Muslim Affairs (OMA).

Concessions were made to the Moro after the creation of these agencies, with the Moro population receiving exemptions from national laws prohibiting polygamy and divorce. In 1977, the Philippine government made another palliative attempt to harmonize Moro customary law with national law. These achievements were seen as superficial. The Moro, still dissatisfied with the past Philippine governments' policies and misunderstanding established a first separatist group known as the Moro National Liberation Front (MNLF) led by Nur Misuari with the intention of creating an independent country. This initiated the modern Moro conflict in the Philippines, which persists, and has since deepened the fractures between Muslims, Christians, and people of other religions. The MNLF is the only recognized representative organization for the Muslims of the Philippines by the Organisation of the Islamic Cooperation (OIC). By the 1970s, a paramilitary organization created by settler mayors in collusion with the Philippine Constabulary, mainly of armed Hiligaynon-speaking Christian settler residents of mainland Mindanao, called the Ilagas began operating in Cotabato, originating from settler communities. In response, Moro volunteers with minimal weapons also group themselves with much old traditional weapons like the kris, spears and barong, such as the Blackshirts of Cotabato and the Barracudas of Lanao, began to appear and engage the Ilagas. The Armed Forces of the Philippines were also deployed; however, their presence only seemed to create more violence, and reports that the Army and the settler militia are helping each other. A Zamboangan Chavacano version of the Ilagas, the Mundo Oscuro (Spanish for Dark World), was also organized in Zamboanga and Basilan. Among the Peruvian and Mexican descendants of Chavacano Spanish-Creole language speakers.

In 1981, internal divisions within the MNLF led to the formation of an Islamic paramilitary breakaway organization called the Moro Islamic Liberation Front (MILF). The group continued the conflict when the MNLF signed a Peace Deal with the Philippine Government in 1994. It has now become the largest and best-organized Moro armed group in Mindanao and Sulu. The Moro Islamic Liberation Front is now in the final stages of the required annex to the Framework Agreement on the Bangsamoro, which has a set time frame for full implementation in 2016.

===== Autonomy =====
The Tulay Mosque in Jolo, Sulu

Although initiated in a 1976 ceasefire, by 1987, as a fallout of the EDSA revolution, peace talks with the MNLF picked up pace with the intention of establishing an autonomous region for Muslims in Mindanao. On 1 August 1989, under Republic Act No. 6734, known as the Organic Act, a plebiscite was held in 18 provinces in Mindanao, the Sulu Archipelago, and Palawan, regardless of the ongoing migration of settlers from Luzón and the Visayas. This was said to determine if the residents would still want to be part of an Autonomous Region. Of all the Provinces and cities participating in the plebiscite, only four opted to join: Maguindanao, Lanao del Sur, Sulu, and Tawi-Tawi. Even its regional capital, Cotabato City, rejected joining the autonomous region, as settlers now greatly outnumber the Moro and Lumad. When they were a majority, they have now become a minority. This still led to the creation of the ARMM, however. A second plebiscite, held a year later in 2001, included Basilan (except its capital, Isabela City) and Marawi City in the autonomous region. Of the original 13 provinces that agreed to the Final Peace Agreement (FPA) with the MNLF, only 5 are now part of the present-day ARMM due to the continuous settler program of the Republic of the Philippines, which began in earnest in 1901.

The ARMM is headed by a regional governor, the result of the Final Peace Agreement between the MNLF and the Philippine government in 1996 under President Fidel Ramos. The regional governor, with the regional vice governor, serves as the head of the executive branch and is served by a Regional Cabinet composed of regional secretaries, mirroring the national government agencies of the Philippines. The ARMM has a unicameral Regional Assembly headed by a speaker. This acts as the legislative branch for the region and is responsible for regional ordinances. It is composed of three members for every congressional district. The current membership is twenty-four. The Supreme Court has since nullified some of the Regional Assembly's acts as "unconstitutional". An example is the nullification of the creation of the Province of Shariff Kabunsuan by the Regional Legislative Assembly (RLA), as this will create an extra seat in the Philippines Congress' House of Representatives, a power reserved solely for the Philippine Congress — Senate and House jointly — to decide on. Some would say, that this proves in itself the fallacy of its Autonomy granted by the Central Government during the Peace Process.

===== Current situation =====
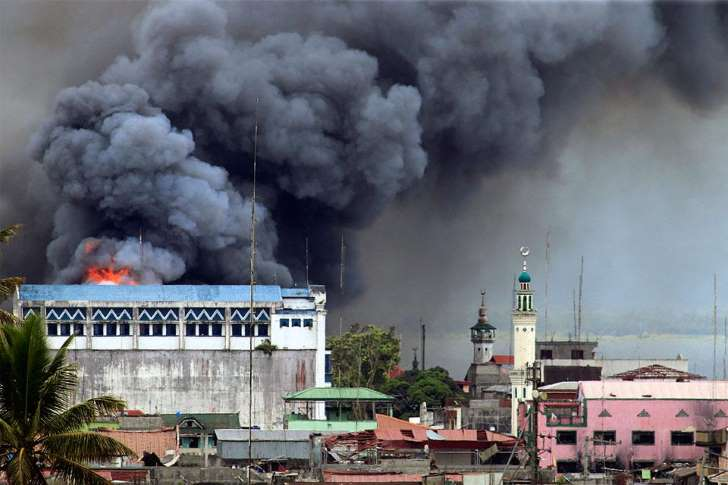
The Battle of Marawi, which destroyed large parts of Marawi City in 2017 in a conflict between militants affiliated with the Islamic State of Iraq and the Levant and the Armed Forces of the Philippines

The Moros had a history of resistance against Spanish, American, and Japanese rule for over 400 years. The armed struggle against the Spanish, Americans, Japanese and Filipinos is considered by present Moro leaders as part of the four centuries long "sovereign based conflict" of the Bangsamoro (Moro Nation). The 400-year-long resistance against the Japanese, Americans, and Spanish by the Moro persisted and morphed into their current war for independence against the Philippine state. Some Moros have formed their own separatist organizations such as the MNLF, MILF and become members of more extreme groups such as the Abu Sayyaf (ASG) and Jemaah Islamiyah (JI) and the latest formed is Bangsamoro Islamic Freedom Fighter ( BIFF).

The Moro Islamic Liberation Front boycotted the original referendum established by the Organic Act and has continued its armed struggle to the present. However, it remains a partner to the peace process, with the Philippines unwilling to brand MILF as a "terrorist" group. Today, the Moro people have become a marginalised minority in Mindanao; they experience discrimination and disadvantages compared to Christians in terms of employment and housing. This has resulted in the establishment of escalating tensions that have contributed to the ongoing conflict between the Philippine government and the Moro people. In addition, there has been a large exodus of Moro peoples comprising the Tausūg, Samal, Bajau, Illanun and Maguindanao to Malaysia (Sabah) and Indonesia (North Kalimantan) since the 1970s due to the illegal annexation of their land by the Catholic majority (in certain regions) and armed settler militias such as the Ilaga, which have destroyed the trust between Mindanao settlers and Moro communities. Land tenure laws have significantly altered the population statistics of the Bangsamoro and have gradually displaced the Moros from their traditional lands.

===== 2014 Draft Bangsamoro Basic Law =====
The office of the Presidential Adviser on the Peace Process has posted a set of frequently asked questions about the Bangsamoro Basic Law (BBL), the draft of which President Benigno Aquino III submitted to Congress leaders. The Bangsamoro Basic Law abolishes the Autonomous Region in Muslim Mindanao and establishes the new Bangsamoro political identity in its place. The law is based on the Comprehensive Agreement on the Bangsamoro signed by the Philippine government and the Moro Islamic Liberation Front in March 2014. It is still to be implemented by the Government by Congressional mandate.

==== In Malaysia ====
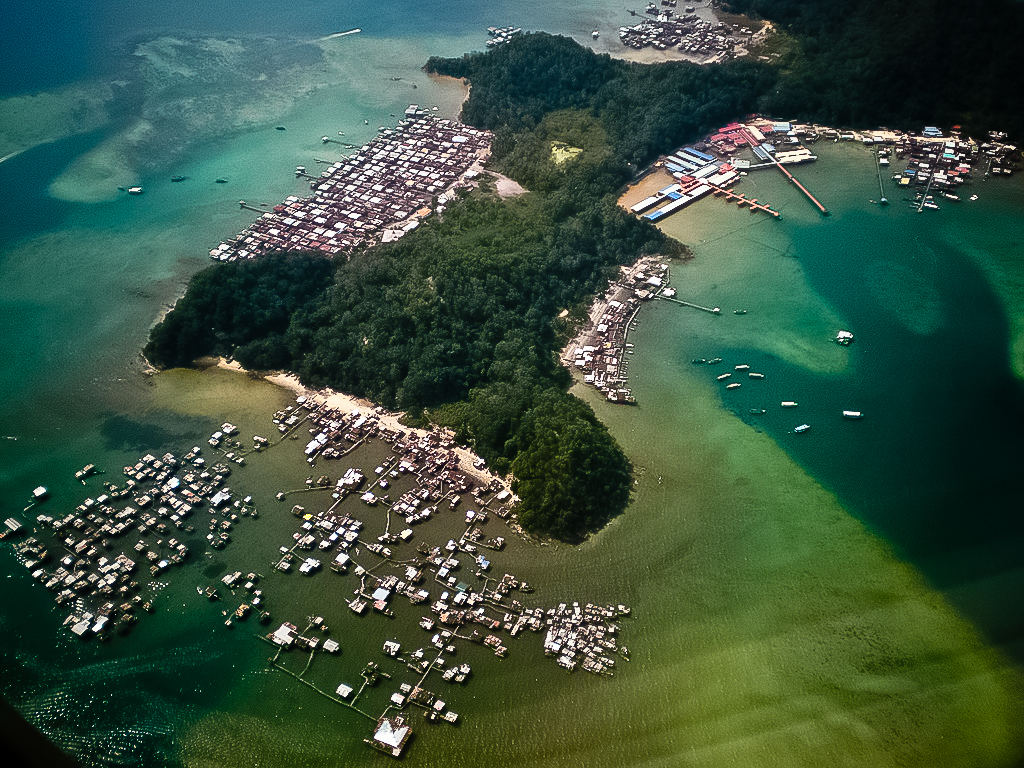
Moro refugees dwellings off the coast of Gaya Island in Sabah.

Due to their conflict in the southern Philippines and the Sulu islands' proximity with the Malaysian state of Sabah, many Moros have emigrated to Sabah since the 1970s in search of better lives. Most of them have been reported to be illegal immigrants living in squalor, prompting the Sabah state government to work on relocating them to proper dwellings to ease management.

==== Bangsa Sug and Bangsa Moro ====
In 2018, a unification gathering of all the sultans of the Sulu archipelago and representatives from all ethnic communities in the archipelago commenced in Zamboanga City, declaring themselves the Bangsa Sug and separating them from the Bangsa Moro of mainland central Mindanao. They cited the complete difference in cultures and customary ways of life they have with the central Mindanao Muslims as the primary reason for their separation. They also called the government to establish a separate Philippine state, called Bangsa Sug, from mainland Bangsa Moro or to incorporate the Sulu archipelago to whatever state is formed in the Zamboanga peninsula, if ever federalism in the Philippines is approved in the coming years.

== See also ==
- Ethnic groups in the Philippines
- Juramentado
- Taming (shield)
- Young Moro Professionals Council
- Maguindanao people
- Maranao people
- Iranun people
- Lumad
- Tagalog people
- Tausūg people
- Kapampangan people
- Ilocano people
- Ivatan people
- Igorot people
- Pangasinan people
- Bicolano people
- Lowland Christian Filipinos
- Negrito
- Visayan people
  - Cebuano people
  - Boholano people
  - Hiligaynon people
  - Waray people
