= Tangkin =

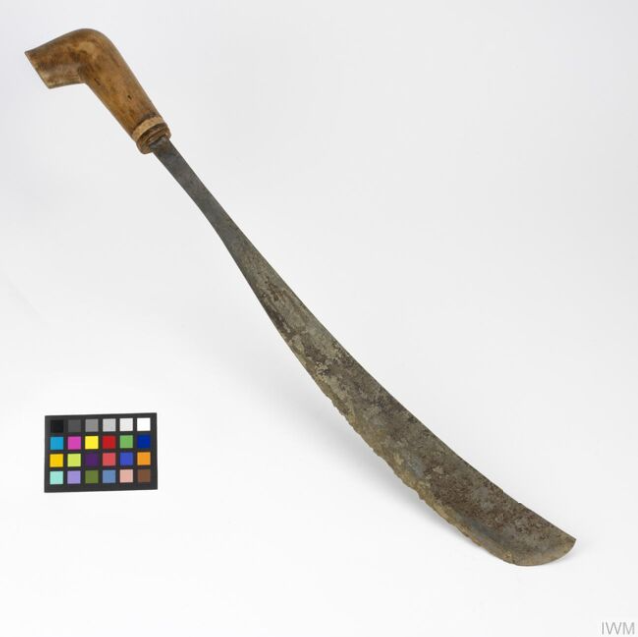
- An Iban Tangkin acquired during the Indonesia–Malaysia confrontation, 1963-1966.
- Type: Parang (knife)
- Place of origin: Borneo (Sarawak, Malaysia & West Kalimantan, Indonesia)

Service history
- In service: Indonesia–Malaysia confrontation (1963-1966)
- Used by: Iban people

Specifications
- Length: overall 59 cm (23 in) approximately
- Blade type: Single edge
- Hilt type: Wood
- Scabbard/sheath: Wood

The Tangkin (also known as Duku Tangkin or Parang Tangkin) is a traditional parang (knife) of the Iban people from Sarawak, Malaysia and West Kalimantan, Indonesia.

The word tangkin in Iban language means "to wear" or "to don", specifically some weapon such as a sword. The Tangkin is often used when men would enter the jungle for fishing or hunting. It is carried by the side of the waist or tied to a loop around the waist.

The Tangkin has a curved wooden handle with a brass ferrule.

The Tangkin of the Iban people is not to be confused with the Tangkitn of the Kendayan people, which actually refers to the same Pandat of the Bidayuh people.

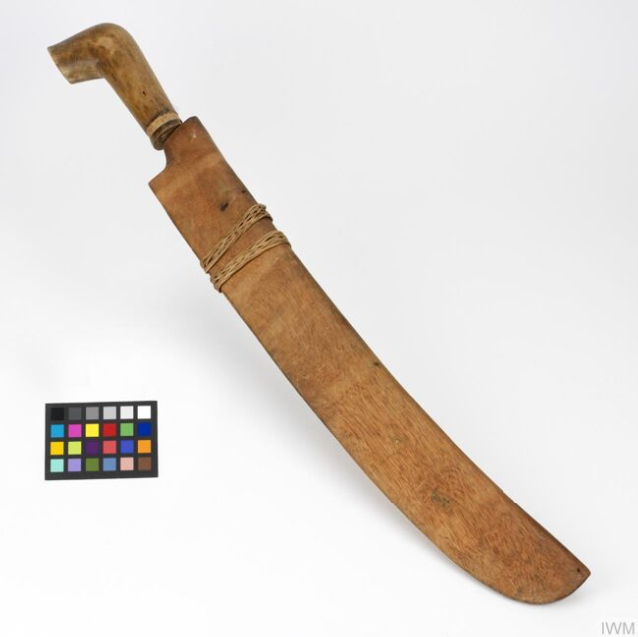
A Tangkin inside a wooden sheath.

== See also ==
- Parang Chandong
- Buko (cleaver)
- Parang Latok
