= Dohong =

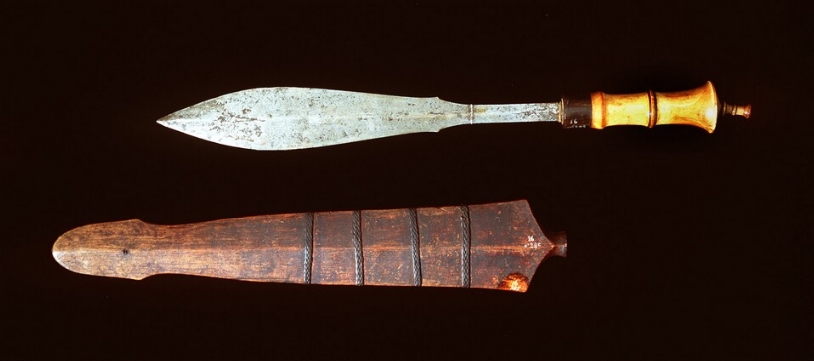
- A dohong dagger of Ngaju people.
- Type: Dagger, short sword
- Place of origin: Borneo (Indonesia, Malaysia)

Service history
- Used by: Dayak people (Ngaju people)

Specifications
- Length: approximately 45 cm (18 in)
- Blade type: Single edge
- Hilt type: Wood, horse or goat hair
- Scabbard/sheath: Wood

A dohong (also duhong or duhung) is a dagger or short war sword from Borneo. The name is used figuratively to imply bravery. In other parts of Borneo, it is referred to as a mandau. The dohong is thought to be an ancient Dayak sword, used long before the mandau was introduced. It is believed to be the oldest weapon of the Dayak people. According to folklore, the first people who owned the Dohong were the forefathers of the Dayaks, namely Raja Sangen, Raja Sangiang, and Raja Bunu.

== Description ==
There are two types of dohong. One version serves for combat; the other as a ceremonial weapon.

The dohong has a double-edged, leaf- or wedge-shaped blade. The blade widens from the hilt to the end-tip. The tip is pointed. The blade usually has a central ridge and looks similar to a spearhead. There are different versions that differ in shape, hilt and decoration. There are blades that represent a figure with arms and legs. The hilt, with no guard, is often decorated with feathers and is made of wood or antler. The scabbards are made of wood in two halves, held together with rattan straps. The surfaces are decorated with carvings, often depicting a face.

The ceremonial dohong is used in mourning ceremonies, and is worn by women when warriors return from headhunting to the village. Amulets made of shark teeth or bear claws are often attached to the belt that holds the dohong.

== See also ==
- Mandau (knife)
- Langgai tinggang
- Niabor
- Pakayun
