= Buko (cleaver) =

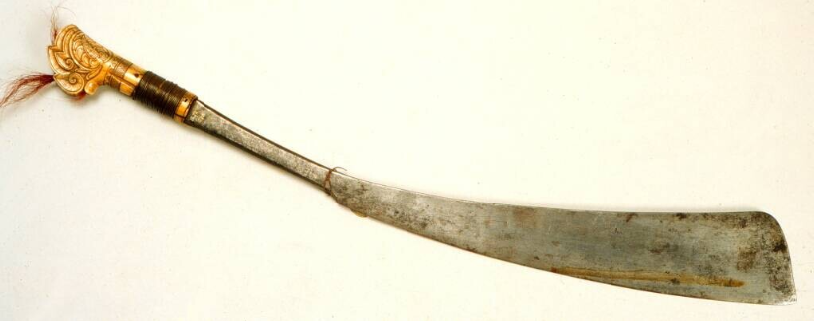
- A Buko from East Kalimantan, 1954.
- Type: Parang (knife)
- Place of origin: Borneo (Sarawak, Malaysia and Kalimantan, Indonesia)

Service history
- Used by: Bornean Malay people, Dayak people (Bidayuh)

Specifications
- Length: approximately 60 cm (24 in)
- Blade type: curved single edged
- Hilt type: wood or horn
- Scabbard/sheath: wood

The Buko, also called Buku or Parang Buko is a cleaver (parang) that originates from Borneo. This parang is used by the native Bidayuh (Land Dayaks) people. While the Buko is also used by the Malays chiefly for carpentering purposes.

== Description ==
The Buko has a curved, single-edged blade. The blade becomes wider from the hilt to the point and is bent sharply after about a fifth. The blade first becomes narrower after the hilt, but then becomes wider again after the bend. The tip is rounded. The handle is made of wood or horn and is decorated with decorative carvings on the pommel. A metal clamp is attached to the transition area from the handle to the blade, which serves to better attach the blade and handle. The Buko bears great resemblance to the Parang Latok and the Pandat.

== See also ==
- Parang Chandong
- Jimpul
