= Bendo (knife) =

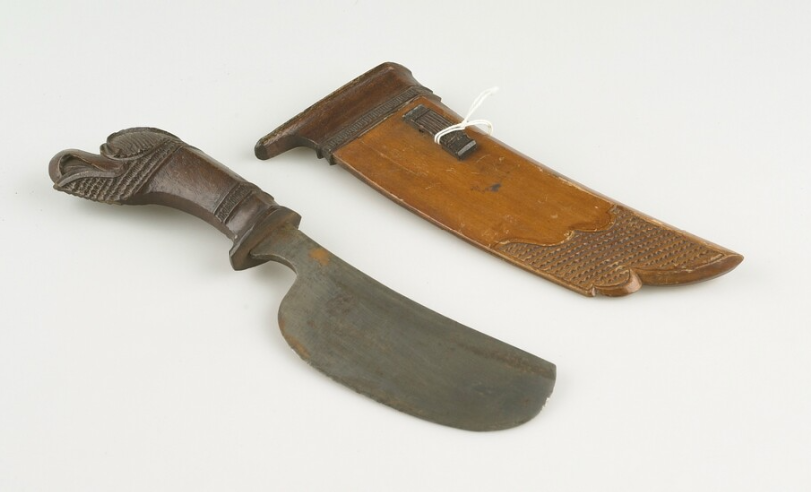
- A Bendo from Java, pre-1951.
- Type: Golok, Cleaver
- Place of origin: Indonesia (Java)

Service history
- Used by: Betawi people, Javanese people

Specifications
- Length: overall length: approx. 26 cm (10 in)
- Blade type: Single edged
- Hilt type: Wood, Horn
- Scabbard/sheath: Wood

The Bendo is a traditional bladed tool from Java, Indonesia. Betawi people would regard the Bendo as a domestic household tool and sometimes it is also called golok dapur, which means a "kitchen golok".

== Description ==
The Bendo has a short, single-edged, heavy blade. The blade is narrow at the hilt and becomes significantly wider after a few centimeters. The back of the blade is straight, the blade is bulbous and has a deep hollow grind that runs just below the back. The handle is usually made of wood and is decoratively carved and slightly curved on the pommel. The scabbards are made of wood and are artfully decorated with carvings. They consist of two halves connected by rattan straps. The Bendo is used to harvest the sugar palm.

== See also ==
- Blakas
- Wedung
