= Golok rembau =

Rembau-style golok golok rembau
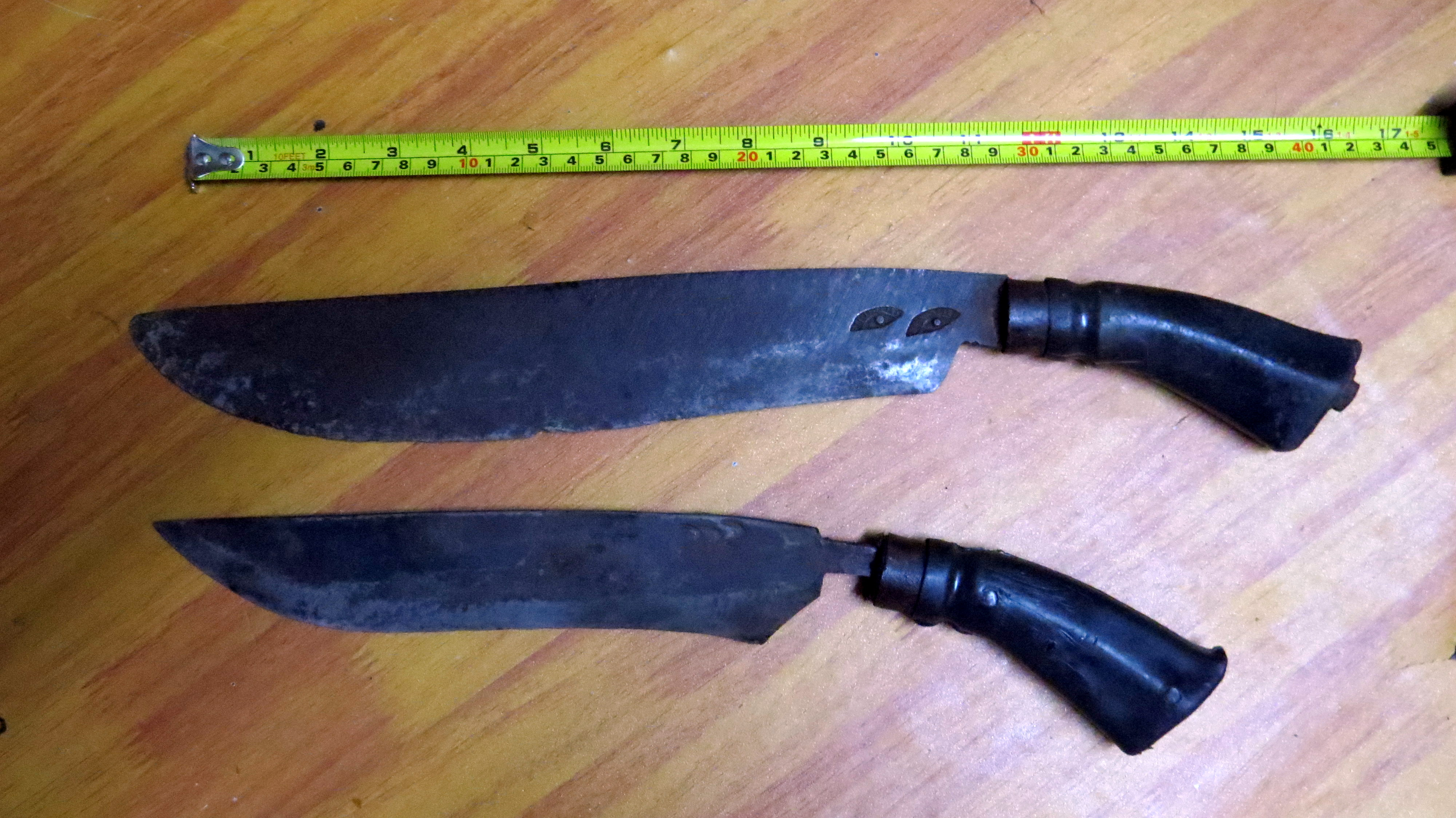
- A pair of Malaysian style golok rembau.
- Type: Golok or machete
- Place of origin: Indonesia (Bengkulu, Jambi, West Sumatra)

Service history
- Used by: Minangkabau people, Malay people

Specifications
- Length: approximately 35–47 cm (14–19 in)
- Blade type: Recurve with convex edge
- Hilt type: Water buffalo horn, wood
- Scabbard/sheath: Wood

A golok rembau is a type of golok in a shape of the tumbok lada, but in a larger version originating from Sumatra, Indonesia. It is also commonly found in Malaysia.

== Description ==
This golok has an angular hilt and a curved blade. A ricasso or finger coil on the blade after the handle is a common design in most Golok Rembau. The blade has a pointy tip with a slight drop point and is approximately 23 to 40 cm (9.1 to 15.7 in) in length. The edge along the blade has a S shape curvature. While most Golok Rembau use a convex edge, some are made with somewhat hollow or flat ground on the edge near the finger coil for small whittling purposes. The scabbard is usually made of wood, however cheap leather sheath can also be found.

== Culture ==
In Asahan Regency, Indonesia, the Golok Rembau is thought to have the magical power to protect its bearer from attack by tigers. Hence sometimes this golok is also referred to as Golok Rimau or Golok Harimau. Because of this belief, men who owned or had been able to borrow the Golok Rembau, exhibited their weapons with complacency and pride.

== See also ==
- Golok tarisi
- Jimpul
- Wedung
