= Pisau raut =

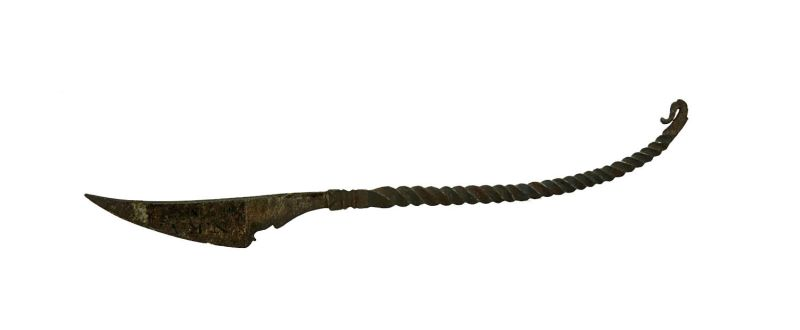
- A pisau raut from Kalimantan, Indonesia, pre-1890.
- Type: Whittling knife
- Place of origin: Malay Archipelago

Service history
- Used by: Dayak people, Orang Asli, and other Malay (ethnic group)

Specifications
- Length: 7.5 to 12.5 cm (3.0 to 4.9 in)
- Blade type: Single edge, chisel grind
- Hilt type: Antler/deer horn, wood
- Scabbard/sheath: Jomok (Artocarpus elasticus) bark or bamboo (Dayak style)

Pisau raut (pisau meaning 'knife'; raut meaning 'trim' or 'pare') is a whittling knife that is commonly used to prepare the rattan and other fine carving found throughout the Malay Archipelago. It is well known as an accompanying knife placed in the same sheath with the mandau, a traditional weapon of the Dayak people.

== Names ==
Pisau raut is found throughout the Borneo where it is known by various names of different Dayak tribal languages such as munbat in the Iban language, langgei or langgei puai in the Ngaju language, jabang among the Dayaks of Baranjan, and haut nyu in the Mandalam Kayan language.

== Description ==
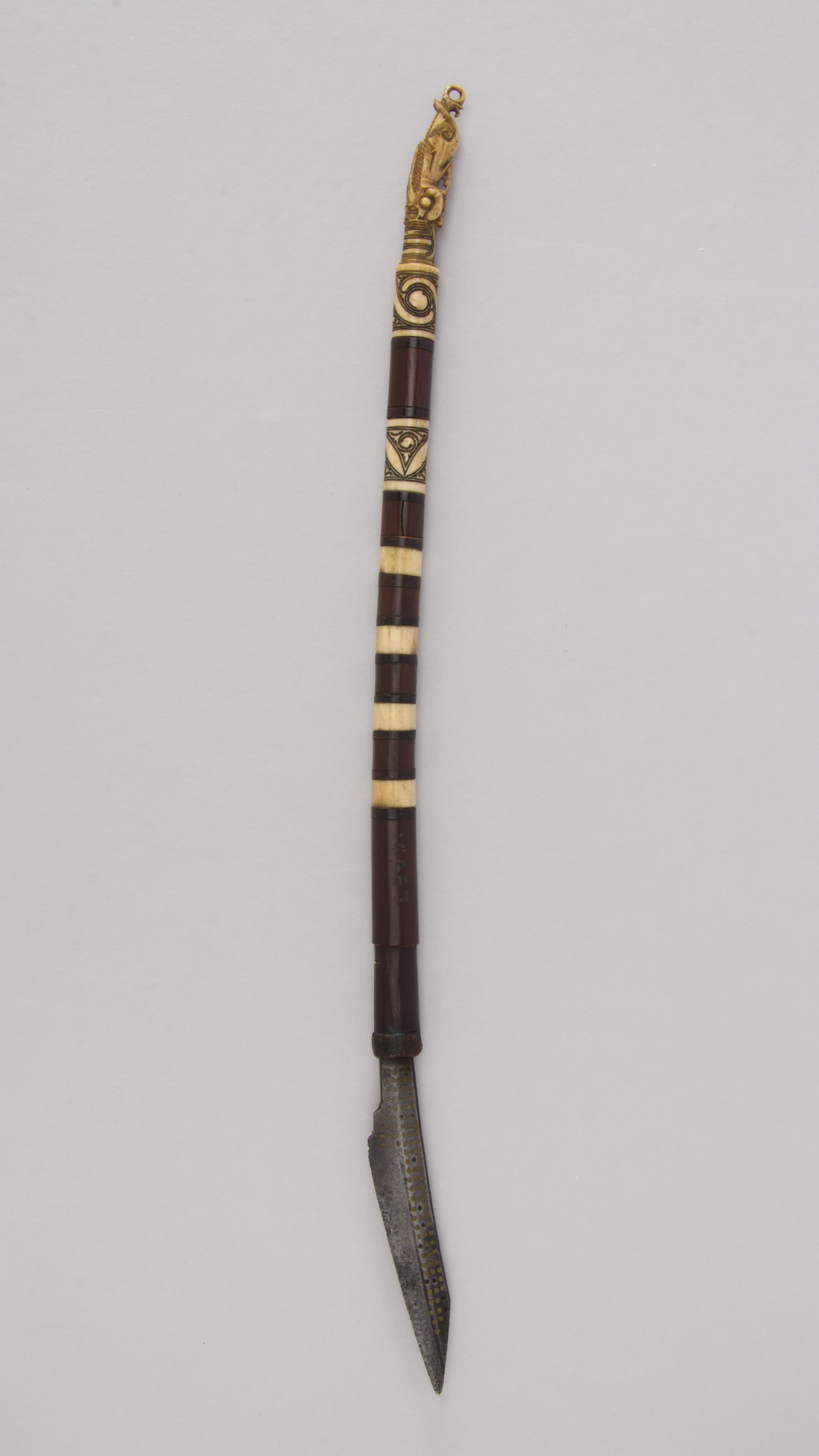
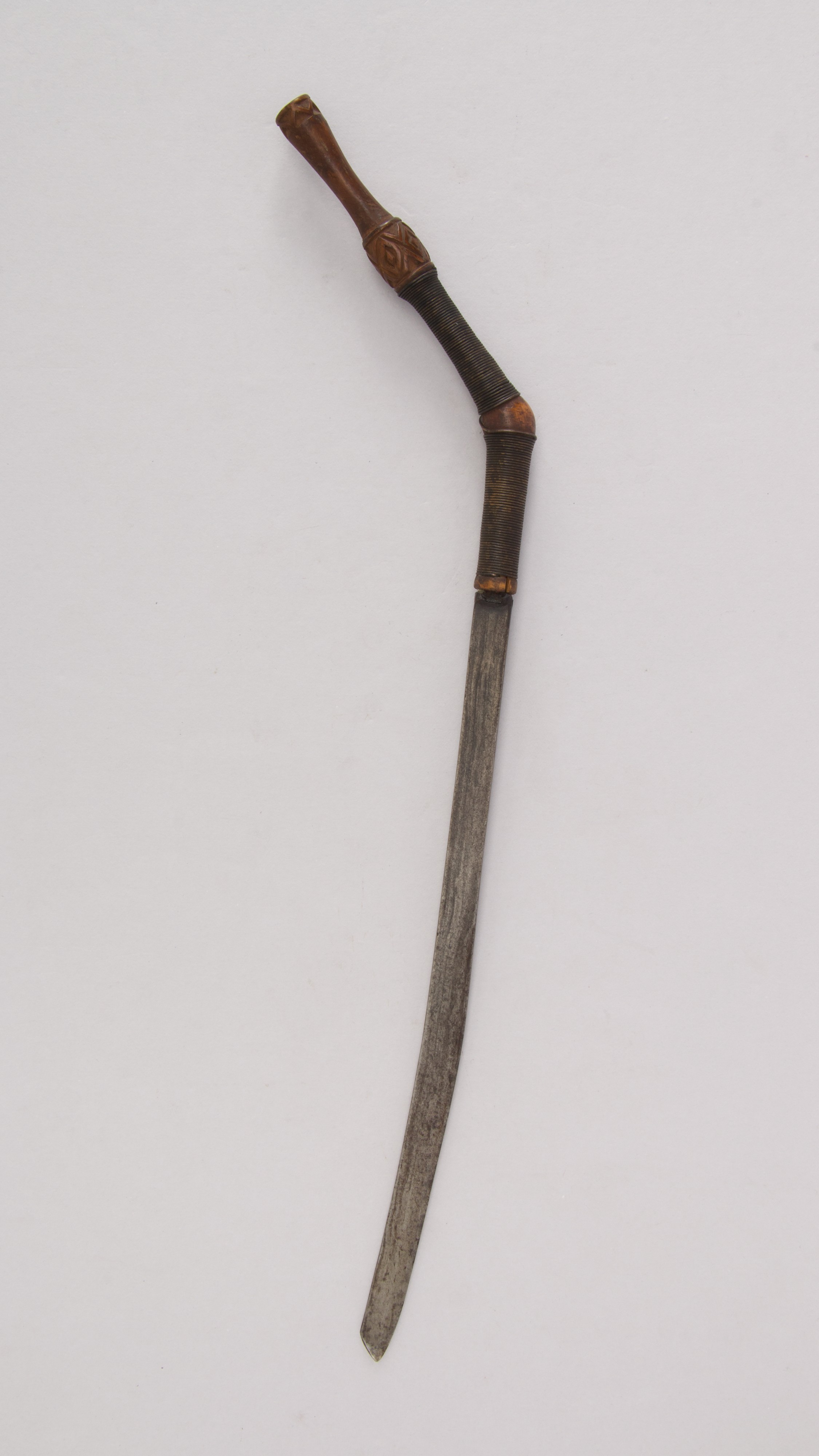
A Dayak style pisau raut typically seen accompanying a Mandau sword (left) and a Malay style pisau raut (right) from Malay Peninsula, circa 18th-19th century.

The scabbard used for the pisau raut is made of palm leaf and attached to the back of the scabbard for the mandau.

Pisau raut consists of a small blade and a wooden handle. The blade is about 10 centimetres (3.9 in) long and is slightly curved. The blade is attached to a wooden hilt that is about three times longer than the blade itself. The blade is attached to the hilt by gluing the blade onto the wooden hilt using a kind of dammar resin taken from the damar tree and then bound with rattan cords. In other version, the blade is convex on one side and concave on the other, which is similar to the design of the Dayak mandau, a much larger blade.

The hilt of the pisau raut is much longer than the blade, reaching 30 centimetres (12 in) to 40 centimetres (16 in) long. It is also slightly curved, following the same curve as the blade. This wooden handle is often decorated with finely carved inlaid bands made of the horn of a water buffalo or a stag. At the end of the handle is a knob which is also made of a horn of a stag, or sometimes of light-colored bone or ivory, giving it a contrast with the normally dark-colored hilt. The knob is intricately decorated with figurative representations of mythical creatures typical of Dayak art, e.g. a stylised aso dragon head above a crouching figure.

== Usage ==
Pisau raut is used by holding the blade between thumb and index finger. Pisau raut styles that has a long hilt is held tight between the ribs and lower arms, or under the armpit. The pisau raut is used with the strength of the body while at the same time used to work on fine details. Other variety of pisau raut found in Sumatra has shorter hilt but with a reversed edged, similar to a mushroom knife. The blade of the pisau raut is usually as sharp as a shaving knife, favored by country folks for numerous fine bamboo and rattan craft works.

The pisau raut is used for harvesting and processing rattan as well as a tool to carve wood. For the Batak people, the pisau raut is also used for carving ornamentals and even Aksara. Although the pisau raut is placed in the same sheath as the weapon mandau, pisau raut was not a weapon and is mostly used as a crafting tool.

== See also ==
- Niabor
- Langgai Tinggang
- Jimpul

== Cited works ==
- Stone, George Cameron (2013). A Glossary of the Construction, Decoration and Use of Arms and Armor: in All Countries and in All Times. Dover: Courier Corporation. ISBN 9780486131290.
- van Zonneveld, Albert G. (2001). Traditional Weapons of the Indonesian Archipelago. C. Zwartenkot Art Books. ISBN 9789054500049.
