= Parang chandong =

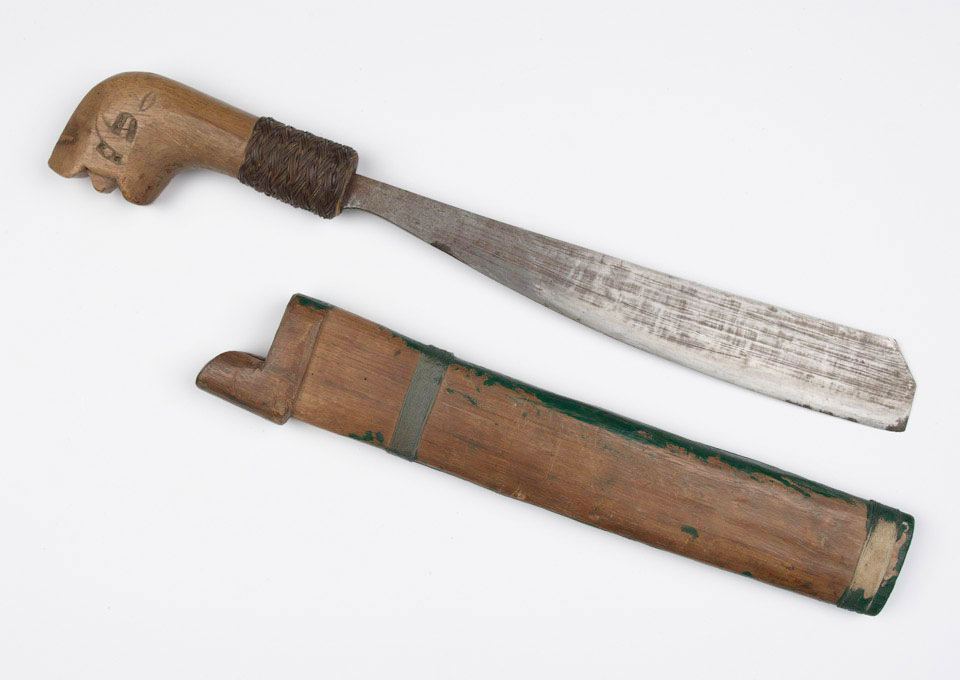
- An Iban-made parang chandong, used by a serviceman during the Malayan Emergency (1948–1957) as seen in the National Army Museum, UK
- Type: Parang
- Place of origin: Borneo (Brunei, Indonesia, Malaysia)

Service history
- Used by: Dayak people (Ibanese)

Specifications
- Length: 40–50 cm (16–20 in)
- Blade type: Sheepsfoot point blade with a single convex edge
- Hilt type: Wood
- Scabbard/sheath: Wood

A parang chandong (also spelled parang candong, parang candung, duku candong, or duku candung) is a traditional chopper used by the Dayak people (Ibanese) of the Baram River in Borneo.

The parang candung is also the primary weapon of Sari Panji, a character in the Rajé Ngalam tale of Sambas Regency, West Kalimantan, Indonesia.

Recently in the west, the parang chandong was popularized by Raymond Mears and is therefore sometimes referred to as a Ray Mears parang.

This parang is also not to be confused with the candung in Lampung language, which refers to another type of golok in Lampung, Indonesia.

== Description ==
The blade's edge is convex. The back is concave and curves towards the edge at the point. The centre of gravity lies near to the tip. The wooden scabbard's two parts are held together by means of rattan strips. The scabbard may be finely decorated, for instance with open-work carvings of floral motifs.

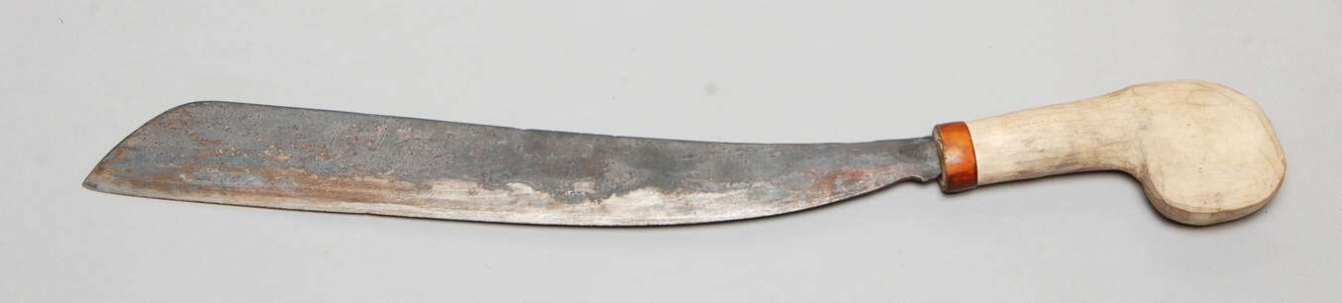
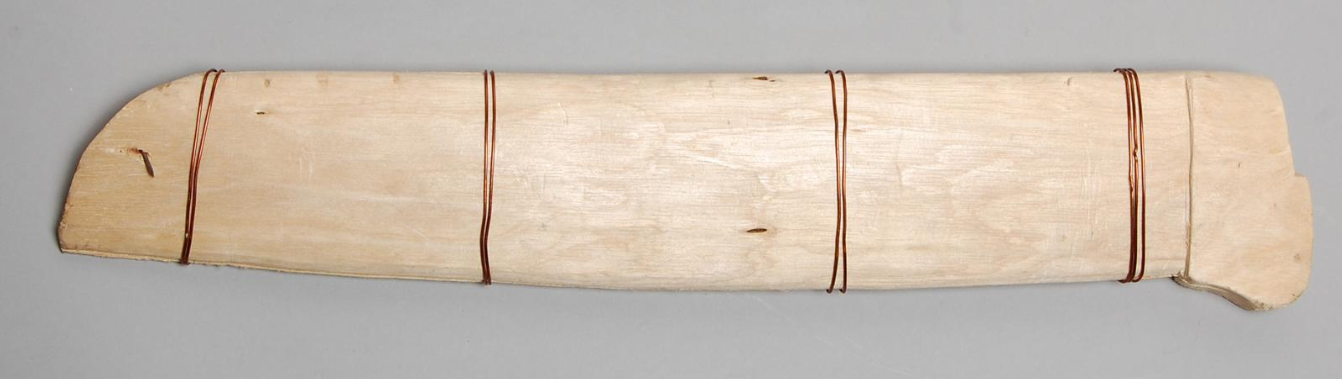
A duku (means parang in Iban language) chandong from Baram River, mid 1970s-1980s.

== See also ==
- Tangkin
- Buko (cleaver)
- Parang latok
