= Parang nabur =

Parang Nabur
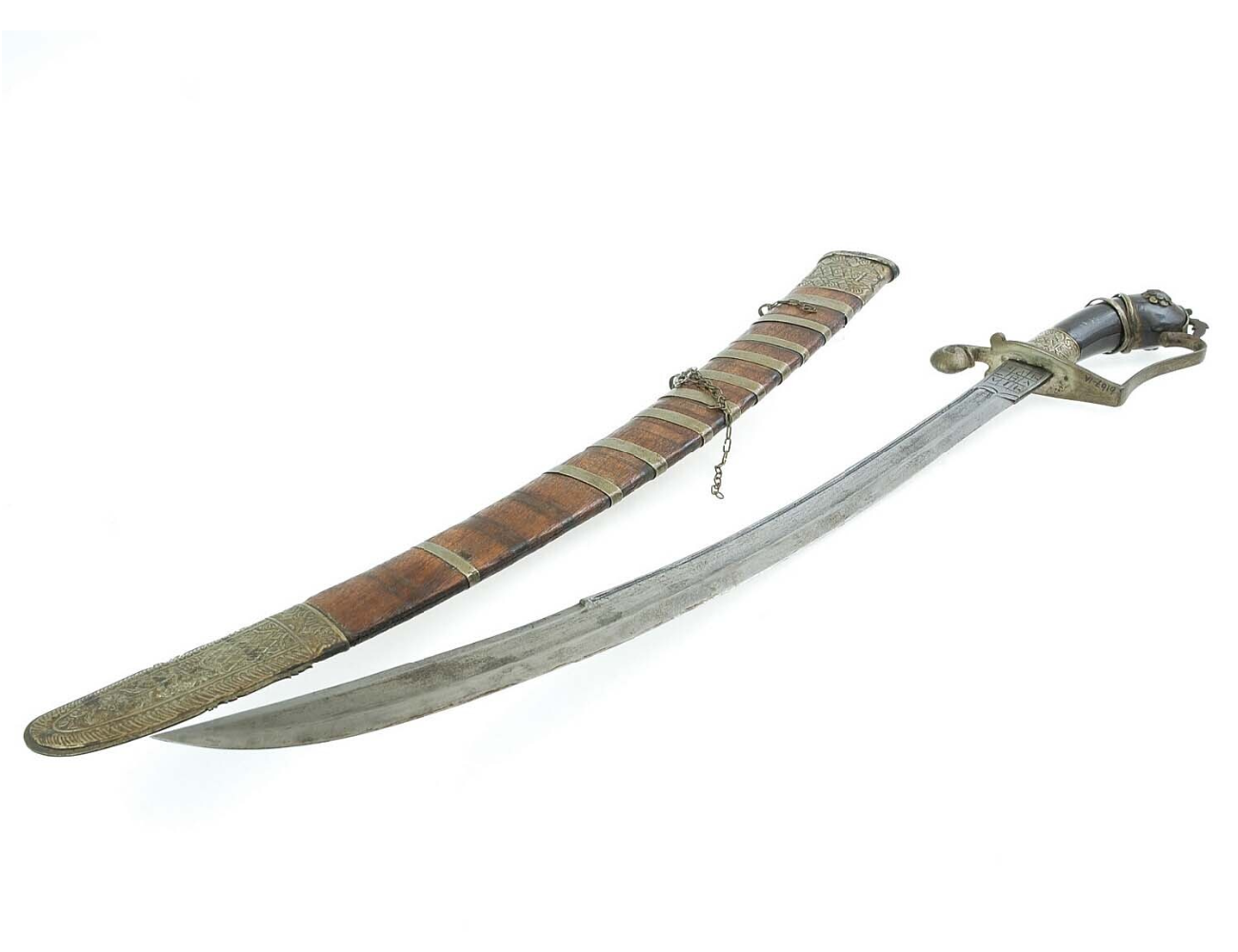
- An unsheathed Parang Nabur from South Kalimantan.
- Type: Sword, Cutlass
- Place of origin: Borneo (South Kalimantan, Indonesia)

Service history
- Used by: Banjarese
- Wars: Banjarmasin War (1859 – 1863)

Specifications
- Length: 50 to 90 cm (20 to 35 in)
- Blade type: Partial double edge, convex grind
- Hilt type: Buffalo horn, bone, wood
- Scabbard/sheath: Wood

Parang Nabur (other names also include Belabang or Beladah, while older variants are called Pacat Gantung or Pacat Bagantung) is a sword that originates from Banjarmasin, South Kalimantan, Indonesia. Most of these swords were made during the Banjarmasin Sultanate period in the 19th century.

== Description ==
The Parang Nabur is a kind of sabre with a curved blade broadening towards the point, with its widest section at the curvature. The edge is convex, while the back is concave. It has a double edge for about 0.66 to 0.375 in (16.8 to 9.5 mm) of the blade from its front tip. The edge may bend towards the back or the back may bend towards the edge at the point. The hilt is usually made of horn or bone, sometimes of wood, and often has protection for the hand and fingers made of brass or iron. The hilt is furnished with a knuckle guard and parry are made similar to European models, strongly influenced from the naval cutlasses carried by the Dutch sailors, and shows a blend of European and Islamic styles. The scabbard is usually made of wood. It is built in two parts held together by bands of metal, and it follows the blade's shape. The Parang Nabur is also not to be mistaken with the Niabor.

== See also ==
- Mandau
- Niabor
