= Blakas =

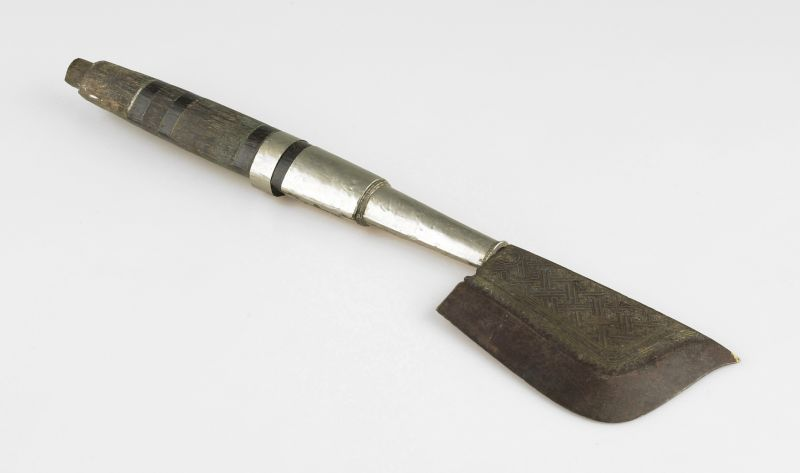
- A Balinese Blakas, pre-1944.
- Type: Chopper, Cleaver, Ceremonial Knife
- Place of origin: Indonesia (Bali)

Service history
- Used by: Balinese people

Specifications
- Blade type: Single edge, chisel grind
- Hilt type: Water buffalo horn, wood
- Scabbard/sheath: Wood

Blakas or Belakas is a general name for any sort of cleaver or large knife originating from Bali, Indonesia that has a heavy rectangular blade with a straight cutting edge used for chopping. The long, rounded hilt often becomes thinner at one or both ends. The blade often has a fanciful shape and encrusted motifs. Sometimes it is made for ceremonial purposes, and also used in pairs with golok. It is a common utensil in Balinese households and is used for kitchen chores, orchard work, and in ceremonial activities.

== See also ==
- Golok
- Parang
