= Pakayun =

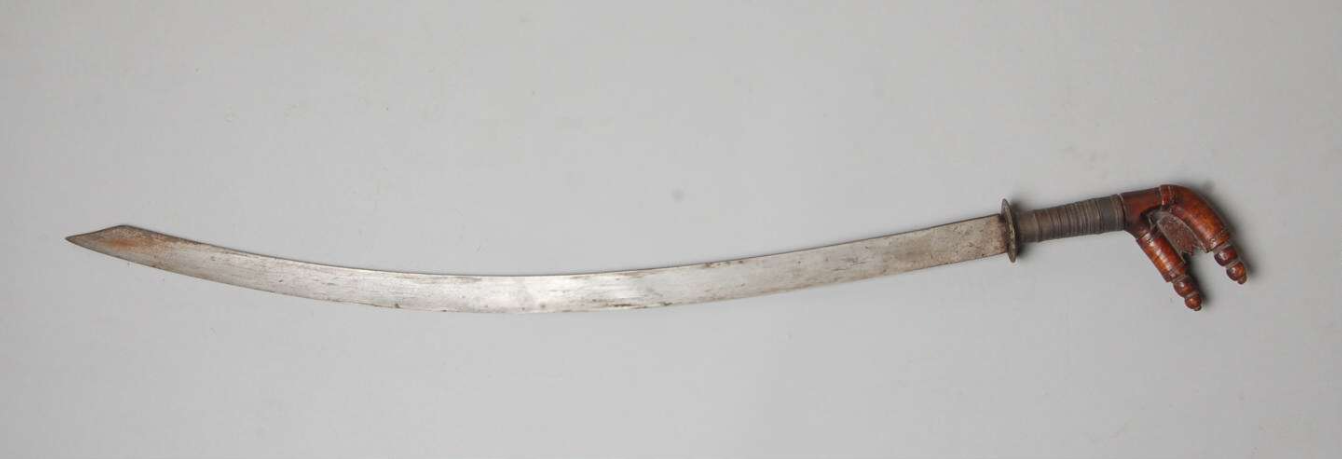
- A late 19th century pakayun sword.
- Type: Sabre sword
- Place of origin: Borneo (Brunei; North Kalimantan, Indonesia; Sabah, Malaysia)

Service history
- Used by: Dayak people (Murut people), Orang Ulu (Lun Bawang)

Specifications
- Length: approximately 80–90 cm (31–35 in) blade
- Blade type: Single edge
- Hilt type: Wood with brass ferrule
- Scabbard/sheath: Wood

The pakayun, as it is called among Malay-speaking Muruts, or parapat in the Murut language, or pelepet or felepet to the Lun Bawang / Lundayeh people, is a sword characteristic of the Murut people of Borneo.

The pakayun is a sabre sword with a light curved blade and a curious forked pommel. The blade is of almost uniform diameter throughout, with its back shorter than the edge, so that there is a short slope at the tip of the blade.

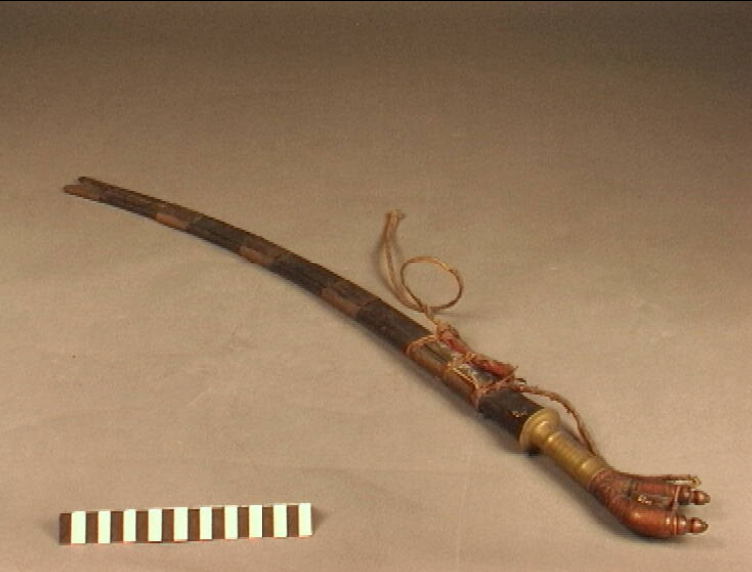
A Pakayun sword in its scabbard.

== See also ==
- Niabor
- Langgai tinggang
- Mandau (knife)
- Dohong
