= Pandat =

War sword of Dayak of Borneo

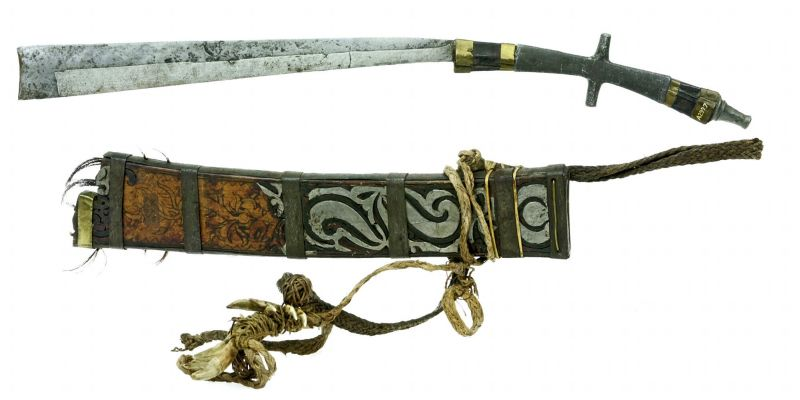
- A Pandat, pre-1887.
- Type: Chopper, War Sword
- Place of origin: Borneo: Malaysia (Sarawak); Indonesia (West Kalimantan)

Service history
- Used by: Dayak people (Bidayuh, Kanayatn, Selako)

Specifications
- Length: 55–70 cm (22–28 in)
- Blade type: single edge, flat grind
- Hilt type: antler/deer horn, iron
- Scabbard/sheath: wood

The Pandat (other names also include Kamping, Parang Pandat, Parang Pandit or Mandau Tangkitn) is the war sword of the Dayak people of northwest Borneo (Sarawak, Malaysia and West Kalimantan, Indonesia) and is never used as a tool. On October 18, 2016, this weapon was featured in season 3 episode 9 of the American bladesmithing competition series Forged in Fire.

== Description ==
The Pandat has a short, heavy, single-edged blade with an iron hilt. It has no real handle, but a short cross-piece of iron or bone passes through the handle. A Tangkin (a term for the Pandat in Kendayan language) with a handle that resembles a cross is referred to as "female Tangkin" by the Kendayan people, while a "male Tangkin" has its handle wrapped in red cloth.

The sword is wielded with one or two hands and used primarily with downward strokes. Its blade and hilt are forged from one piece and the blade is bent, just before the hilt, at an angle of 25 degrees. The bend in the blade is located in the transitional part between the blade and the hilt. Both the back and the edge are straight and run apart, so that the blade's broadest part is at the point. The blade length is generally between 55 and 70 centimetres (22 and 28 in) and the handle is about 40 centimetres (16 in) long. The sheath is usually made of wood and decorated with traditional patterns. It may be decorated with feathers or tufts of hair or simply painted red.

== Use ==
It is thought that a downward cut would be highly inefficient and unbalanced, throwing a great strain upon the wrist. Pandats are well balanced for upward cuts, but this would perhaps not be a very effective form of attack. The Pandat's typically bent blade is very similar to Parang Latok which, unlike the Pandat, is used as a tool.

== See also ==
- Jimpul
- Langgai Tinggang
- Mandau
- Niabor
