= Wedung =

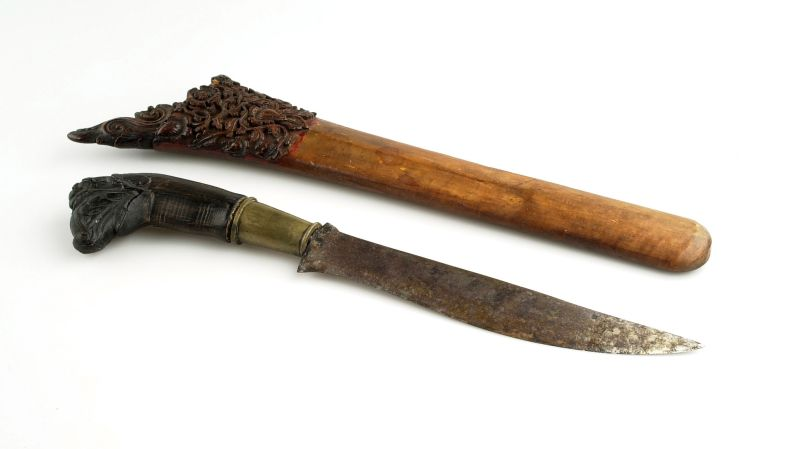
- A Balinese style Wedung, pre-1939.
- Type: Ceremonial Knife, Machete
- Place of origin: Indonesia

Service history
- Used by: Balinese people, Javanese people

Specifications
- Length: approximately 30 to 35 cm (12 to 14 in)
- Blade type: Straight back blade with convex edge
- Hilt type: Wood, buffalo horn
- Scabbard/sheath: Wood, buffalo horn fittings

Wedung (or Wedoeng, Wedong) is a traditional large knife of the Javanese people and the Balinese people originating from Indonesia.

== Description ==
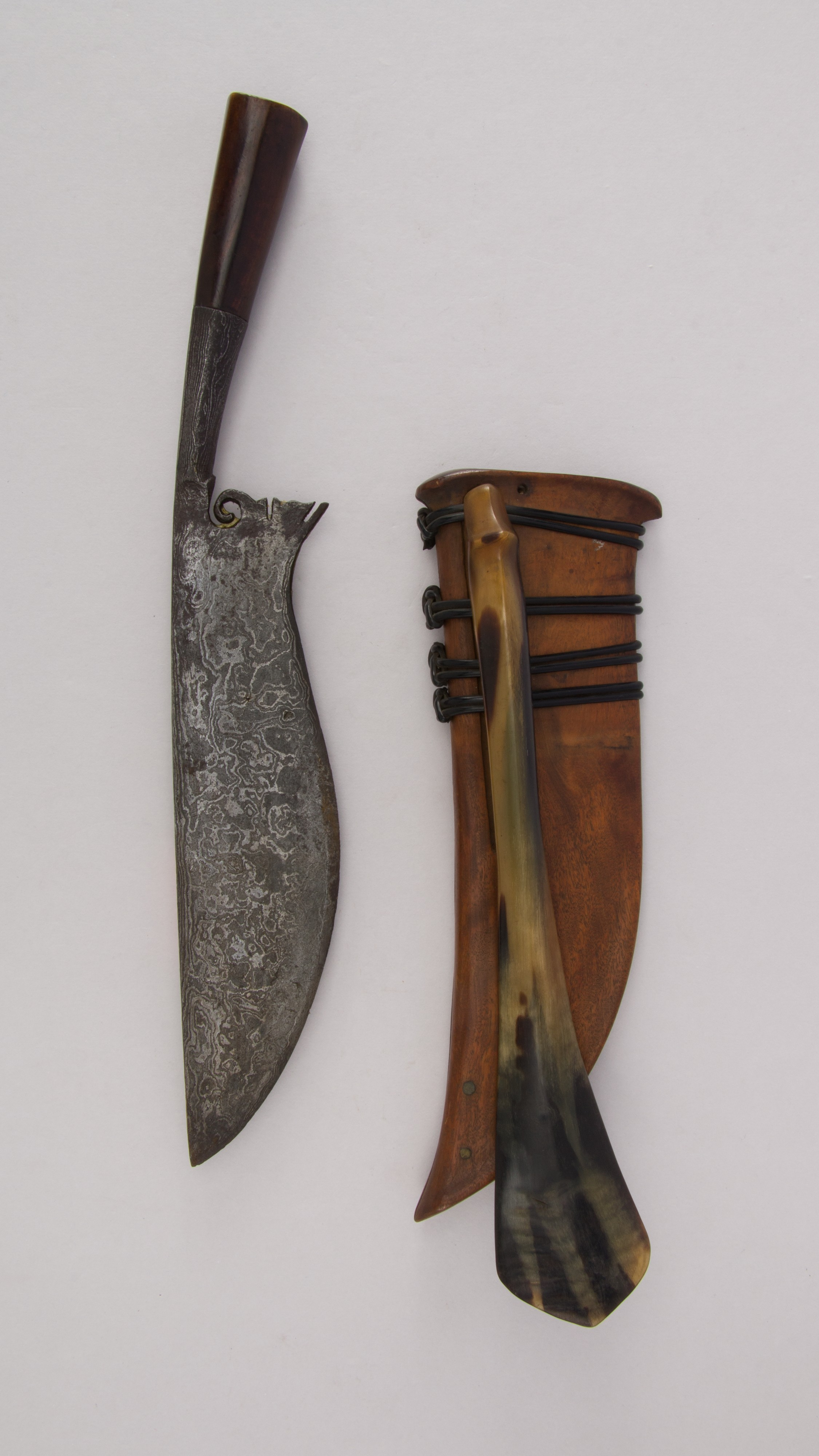
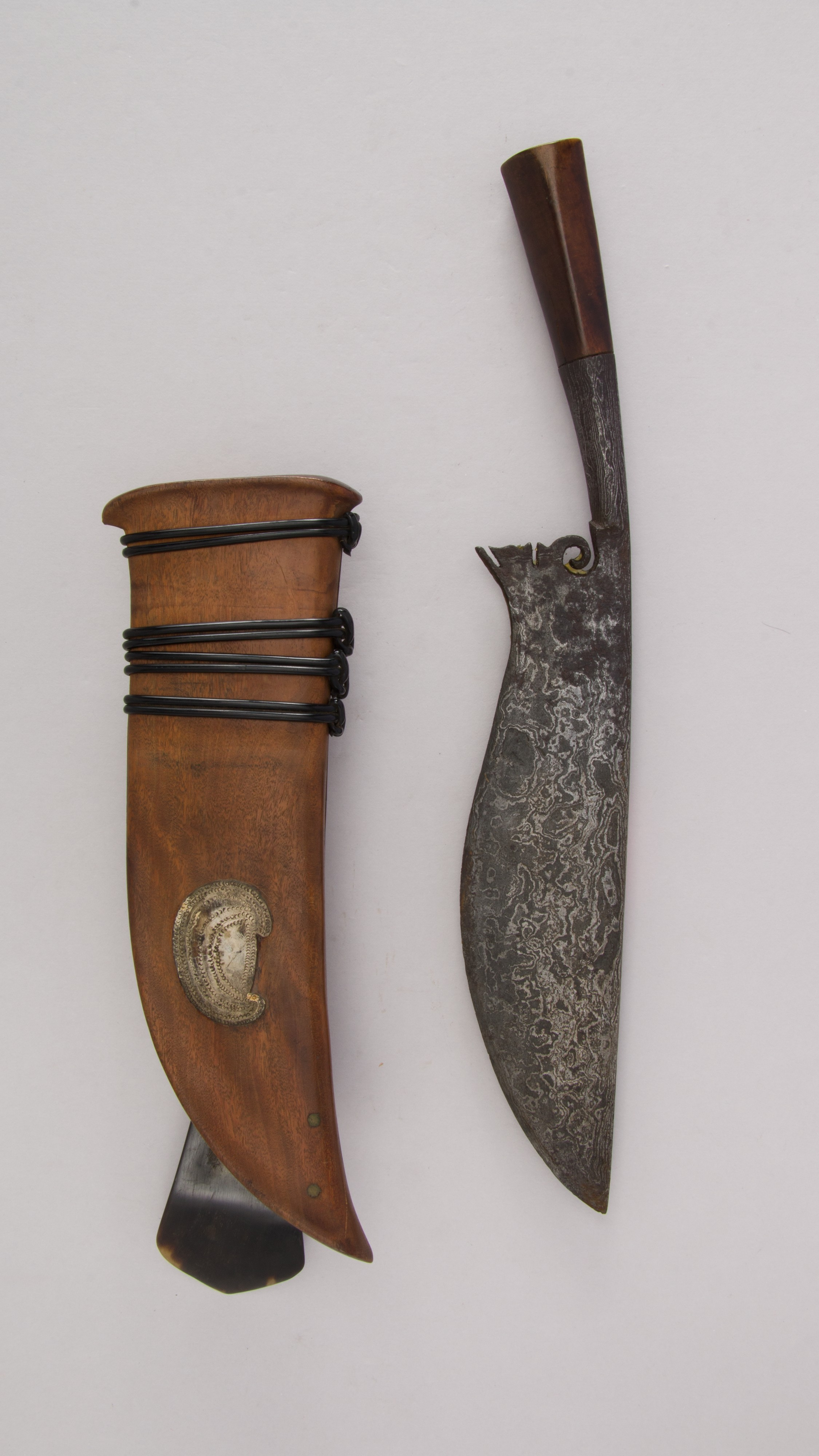
A Javanese style Wedung, circa 16th-19th century.

The Wedung is a short and broad machete (Bendho). Its blade has a straight back and an S-shape edge. It may be made of smooth iron, but pamor forge work also occurs. The back is sometimes sharpened along 1/3 of its length from the point. The blade's base is straight and stands at an angle of 90 degrees to the back. This base usually has decoration shaped as filed-out indentations or small teeth (greneng). A round 'eye' or hole (kembang kacang) is sometimes found. Furthermore, the base may be decorated with inlay work and representations of mythical dragon (naga), leaf and floral motifs. The tang (peksi) is made out of the blade's thick back rim. Between the spike and the blade, a pentagonal segment (metok or integral bolster) is forged. The short hilt, which is pentagonal on Java, forms as it were, an extension of the metok. The hilt is usually made of wood, but other materials such as animal tooth are also found. Its smooth upper part is flattened. The Wedung on Bali has narrower shape and is usually more lavishly decorated. On the rear near the base a lengthy decoration is sometimes added. The hilt and the metok of the Balinese Wedung are instead of pentagonal, usually round in cross-section. It is sometimes chiselled. The wooden scabbard usually follows the blade's shape, but may have a rectangular lower part. Its mouth has a broadened rim all around. At the rear side the scabbard has a large horn hook shaped (sangkletan) resembling a shoe-horn, with which the Wedung can be hitched onto the belt. This hook is attached to the scabbard by means of strips of horn, rattan or metal. On expensive examples the scabbard sometimes has one or two round or comma-shaped golden or silver mounts.

== Culture ==
The Wedung is a peculiar weapon, in the shape of a chopper, worn on occasions of the state by all chiefs when in the presence of the sovereign. It is carried in the palace (kraton) as a symbol of servitude to the sultan for performing tasks such as cutting of shrubs or even the most humble work such as grass cutting. It is therefore, no longer a real weapon but rather a work-tool carried on the left hip and used as personal decoration. Unlike the Keris which is only meant for men, the Wedung can be worn by both men and women in the kraton.

== See also ==
- Parang Latok
