= Jimpul =

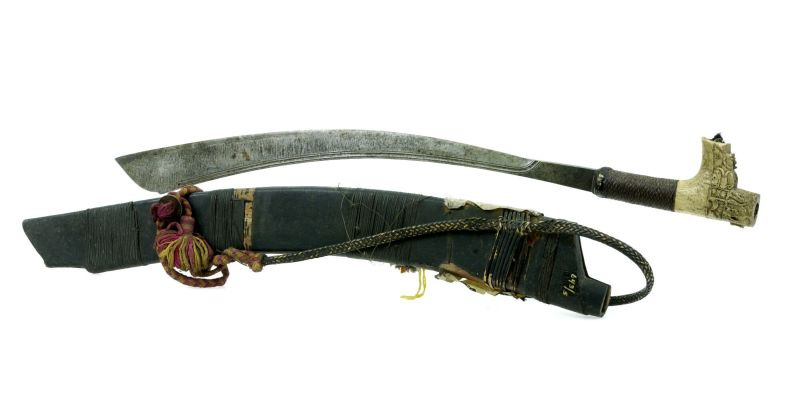
- A Parang Jimpul, pre-1930.
- Type: Chopper, Machete
- Place of origin: Borneo (Sarawak, Malaysia, West Kalimantan and Central Kalimantan, Indonesia)

Service history
- Used by: Dayak people (Iban / Sea Dayak), Kenyah people

Specifications
- Length: approximately 60–75 cm (24–30 in)
- Blade type: Single edge, flat grind
- Hilt type: Antler/deer horn, wood
- Scabbard/sheath: Wood

Jimpul (other names also include Jumbul, Mandau Pasir, Parang Djimpul, Parang Jimpul) is a traditional weapon of the Sea Dayak and Kenyah people from Borneo. It is often thought that the Parang Jimpul may be considered as a hybrid between the Mandau and Langgai Tinggang. The Parang Jimpul is an intermediary form between the Mandau and the Langgai Tinggang dating from c. 1870-c. 1885.

== Description ==
The blade of the Parang Jimpul has flat sides and is distinctly curved. Widening towards the point, it ends in a slanting angle or drop point. The edge is longer than the spine. The blade may have two or three grooves, running at short distance from the back, as well as hooks and protrusions (krowit) near the hilt on the sharp edge. Chased figures can be found on both sides near the hilt. The hilt and scabbard are made in the same way as those of the Mandau. Just as the shape of the blade is, the scabbard is also curved. The blade of the Parang Jimpul is very identical to the Parang Lading and Parang Panyang.

== See also ==
- Langgai Tinggang
- Mandau
- Niabor
- Pisau raut
