= Parang latok =

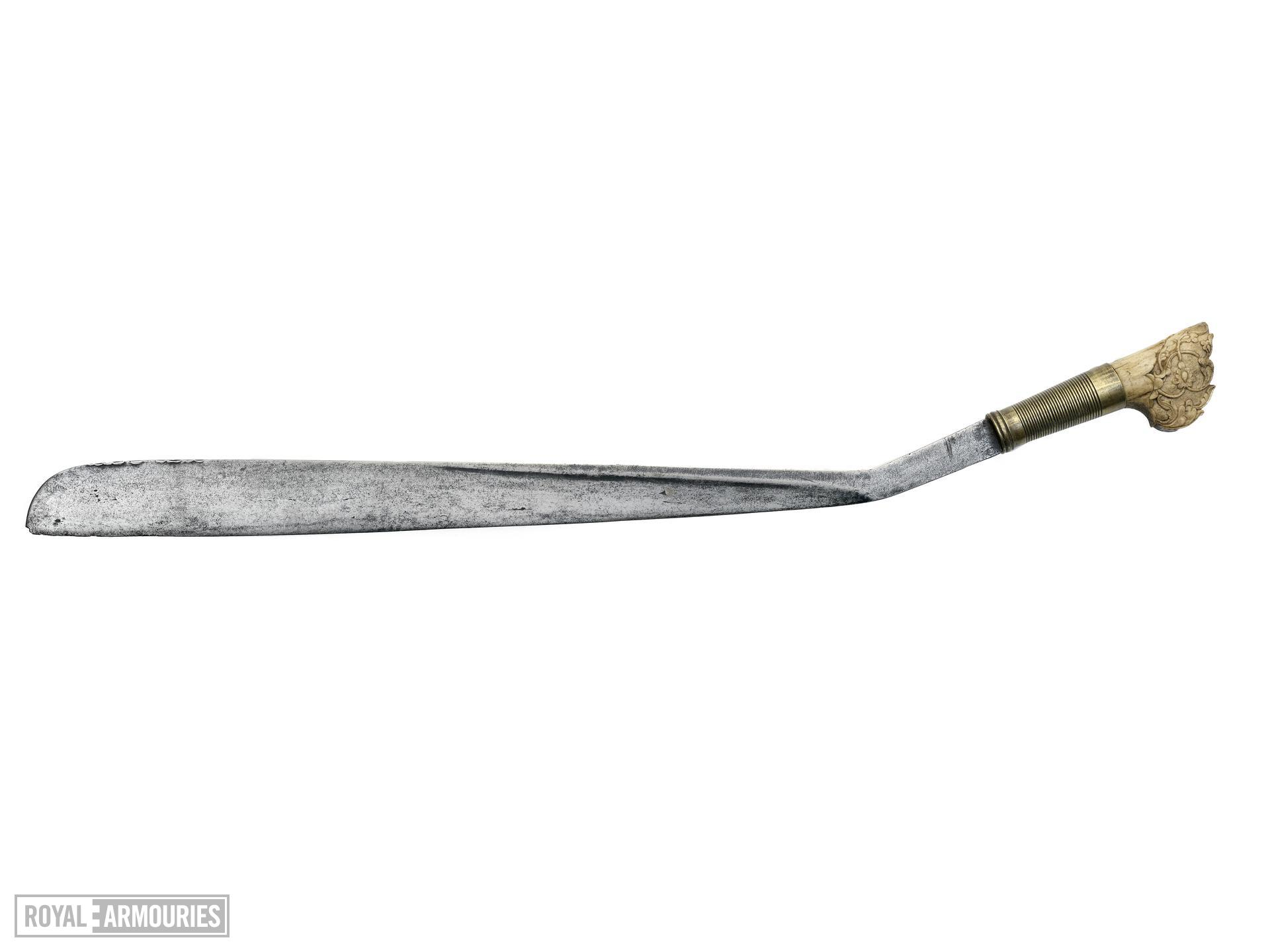
- A Parang Latok, circa 1800-1899.
- Type: Parang, Sword
- Place of origin: Borneo (Sarawak, Malaysia and West Kalimantan, Indonesia)

Service history
- Used by: Bornean Malay people, Dayak people (Bidayuh)

Specifications
- Length: approximately 55 cm (22 in)
- Blade type: single edged, one sided chisel grind
- Hilt type: wood
- Scabbard/sheath: wood

A parang latok (which is also known as latok, latok buku or parang pathi) is a sword from Borneo in Sarawak, Malaysia; where it is regarded as the national weapon of the Sarawakian Malay people and the Bidayuhs (Land Dayak people), and as well as Kalimantan, Indonesia. It also functions as a machete.

Its used for both timber felling, agricultural activities and warfare is characterised by the noticeable bent at an obtuse angle from one-third of its length starting from the pommel. This parang features a single-edge blade that is heavier and wider towards the point of the blade. The handle of the parang latok is made of wood without a guard and often tied securely with rattan at its grip. It is carried in a long, two-piece wooden sheath to properly hold the blade.

In the past, the parang latok is also used for executing condemned criminals, and the decapitation is normally achieved with a single blow. This parang is used two-handedly, with one hand holding the hilt and the other holding the blade's shoulder, enabling its user to strike downwards.

A smaller version of the parang latok is called the buko, while another variant of the parang latok is known as the sadap.

== See also ==
- Pandat
