= Golok =

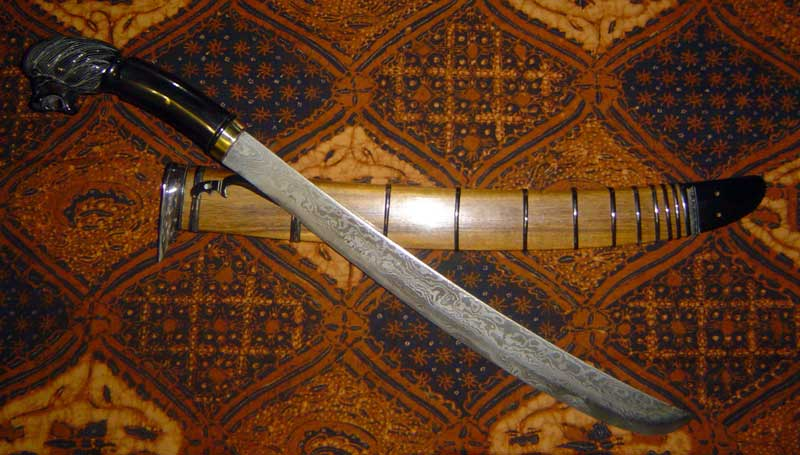
- A traditional Indonesian golok
- Type: Machete
- Place of origin: Malay Archipelago

Service history
- Used by: Austronesian people

Specifications
- Length: 25–50 cm (9.8–19.7 in)
- Blade type: Single edge, convex grind
- Hilt type: Water buffalo horn, wood
- Scabbard/sheath: Water buffalo horn, wood

A golok is a cutting tool, similar to a machete, that comes in many variations and is found throughout the Malay Archipelago. It is used as an agricultural tool as well as a weapon. The word golok (sometimes misspelled in English as "gollock") is used in Indonesia and Malaysia. Both in Malaysia and in Indonesia, the term is usually interchangeable with the longer and broader parang. In the Sundanese region of West Java it is known as bedog. In the Philippines, the term gulok (also known as gunong), refers to different dagger weapons including the kris.

== History ==
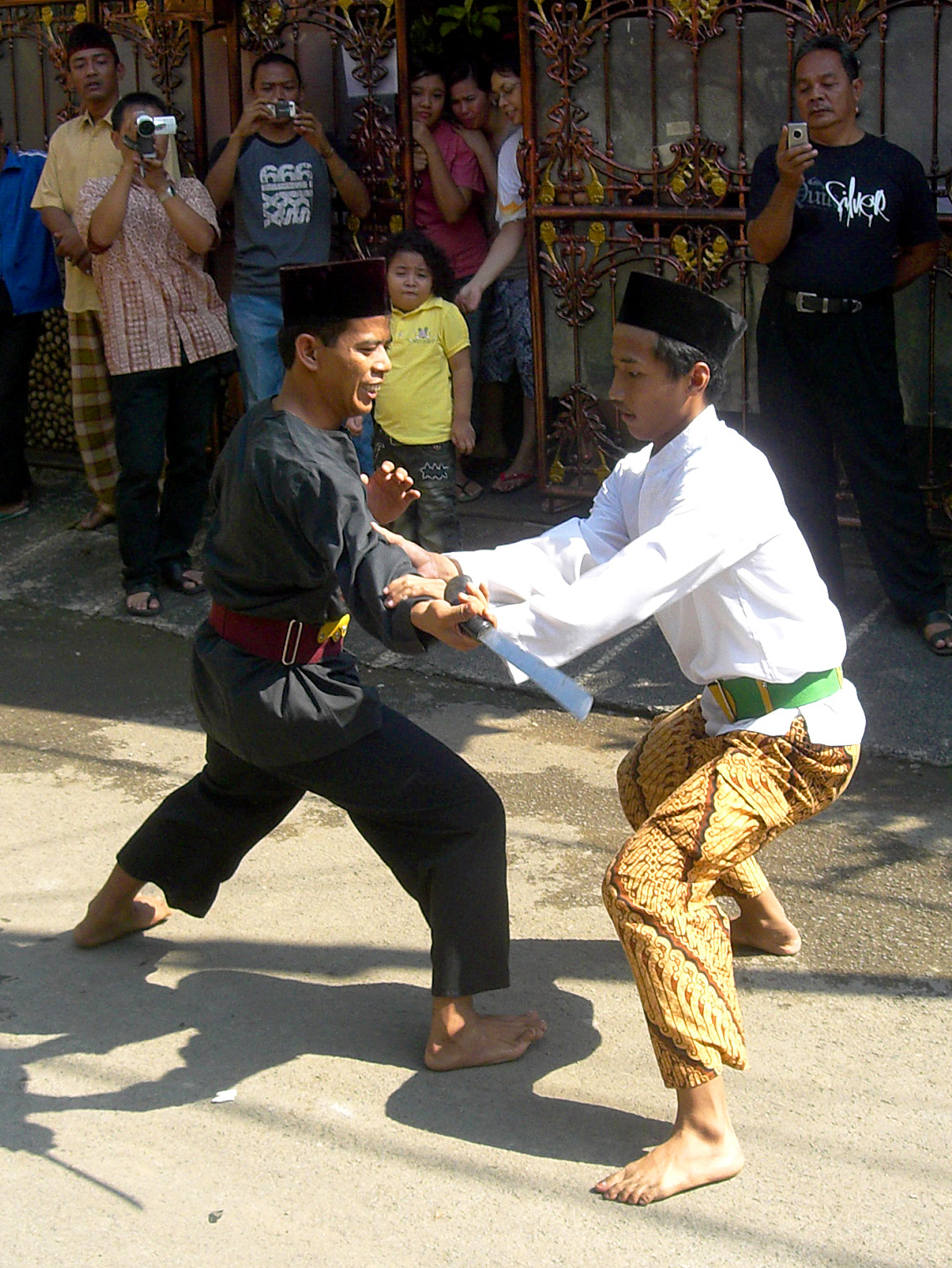
Silat Betawi demonstration of disarming a person who has a golok.

In Indonesia, the golok is often associated with the Sundanese and Betawi people. The Betawi recognize two types of golok; gablongan or bendo is the domestic tool used in the kitchen or field for agricultural purposes, and the golok simpenan or sorenam that is used for self-protection and traditionally always carried by Betawi men. The golok is a symbol of masculinity and bravery in Betawi culture. A jawara (local strongman or village champion) will always have a golok hung or tied around the waist at the hips. This custom, however, has ceased to exist since the 1970s, when authorities would apprehend those that carry the golok publicly and have it confiscated in order to uphold security, law and order, and to reduce gang fighting.

Sundanese, Javanese and Malay goloks have also been recorded. The use of golok in Sundanese was recorded in Sanghyang Siksa Kandang Karesian (text dated 1518) and in Malay was recorded as early as the Hikayat Hang Tuah (text dated 1700) and Sejarah Melayu (1612),

== Description ==
Sizes and weights vary, as does blade shape, but the typical length is 25–50 cm (9.8–19.7 in). Goloks tend to be heavier and shorter than parangs or common machetes, typically being used for bush and branch cutting. Most traditional goloks use a convex edge or an edgewise taper, where the blade is less likely to get stuck in green wood than flat edged machetes. The blade is heaviest in the centre and flows away in a curve to a sharp point at the tip.

Goloks are traditionally made with a springy carbon steel blade of a softer temper than that of other large knives. This makes them easier to dress and sharpen in the field, but it also requires more frequent attention. Although many manufacturers produce factory-made goloks, there are still handmade productions that are widely and actively made in Indonesia.

== Modern application ==
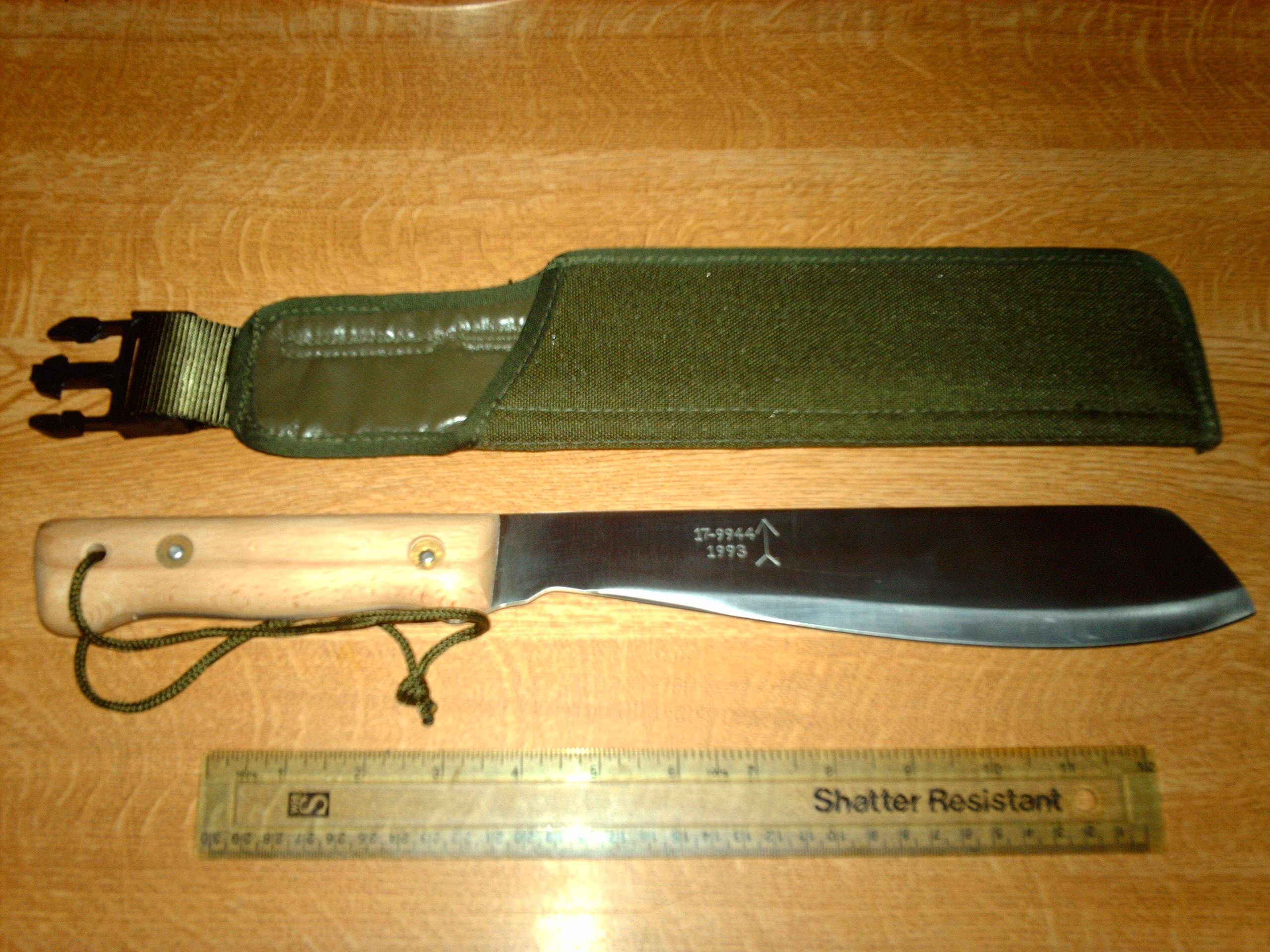
Martindale design is a modern representation of another traditional golok variant, the Golok Bangkung.

The golok style is noted for being the pattern for British Army-issue machetes used since the early 1950s.

== See also ==
- Bolo knife
- Golok rembau
- Klewang
- Kukri
