= Mandau (knife) =

Traditional weapon of the Dayak people of Borneo

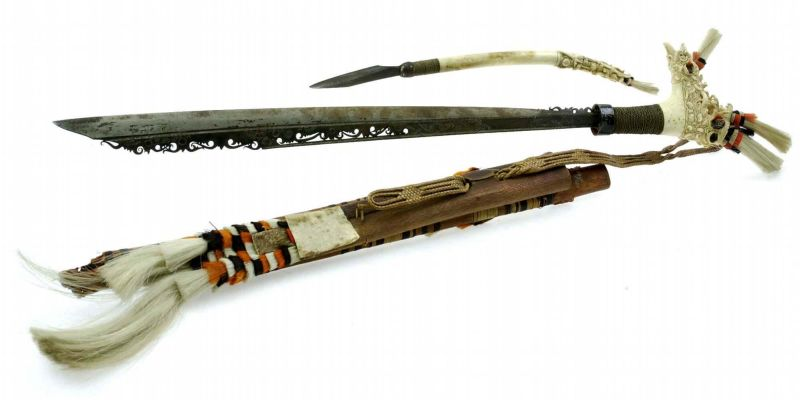
- A mandau complete with a langgei puai (whittling blade), pre-1927.
- Type: Sword, cutlass, ceremonial blade
- Place of origin: Borneo (Brunei, Indonesia, Malaysia)

Service history
- Used by: Dayak (Sea Dayak, Bidayuh, Kayan, Kenyah, Penan, Lun Bawang/Lundayeh)

Specifications
- Blade type: Single edge, one side convex and concave on the other side
- Hilt type: Antler/deer horn, wood, animal or human hair
- Scabbard/sheath: Wood, antler or bone fittings, animal or human hair

A mandau is the traditional weapon of the Dayak people of Borneo. It is also known as parang ilang among the Bidayuh, Iban and Penan people, malat by the Kayan people, baieng by the Kenyah people, or bandau by Lun Bawang, and pelepet or felepet by Lundayeh. The mandau is mostly ceremonial, but a less elaborate version called an ambang is used as an everyday practical tool.

Associated with the headhunting ceremony, in which people would gather to attack other tribes and gather heads to be used in various festivities, the mandau is both a work of art and a weapon.

== Description ==
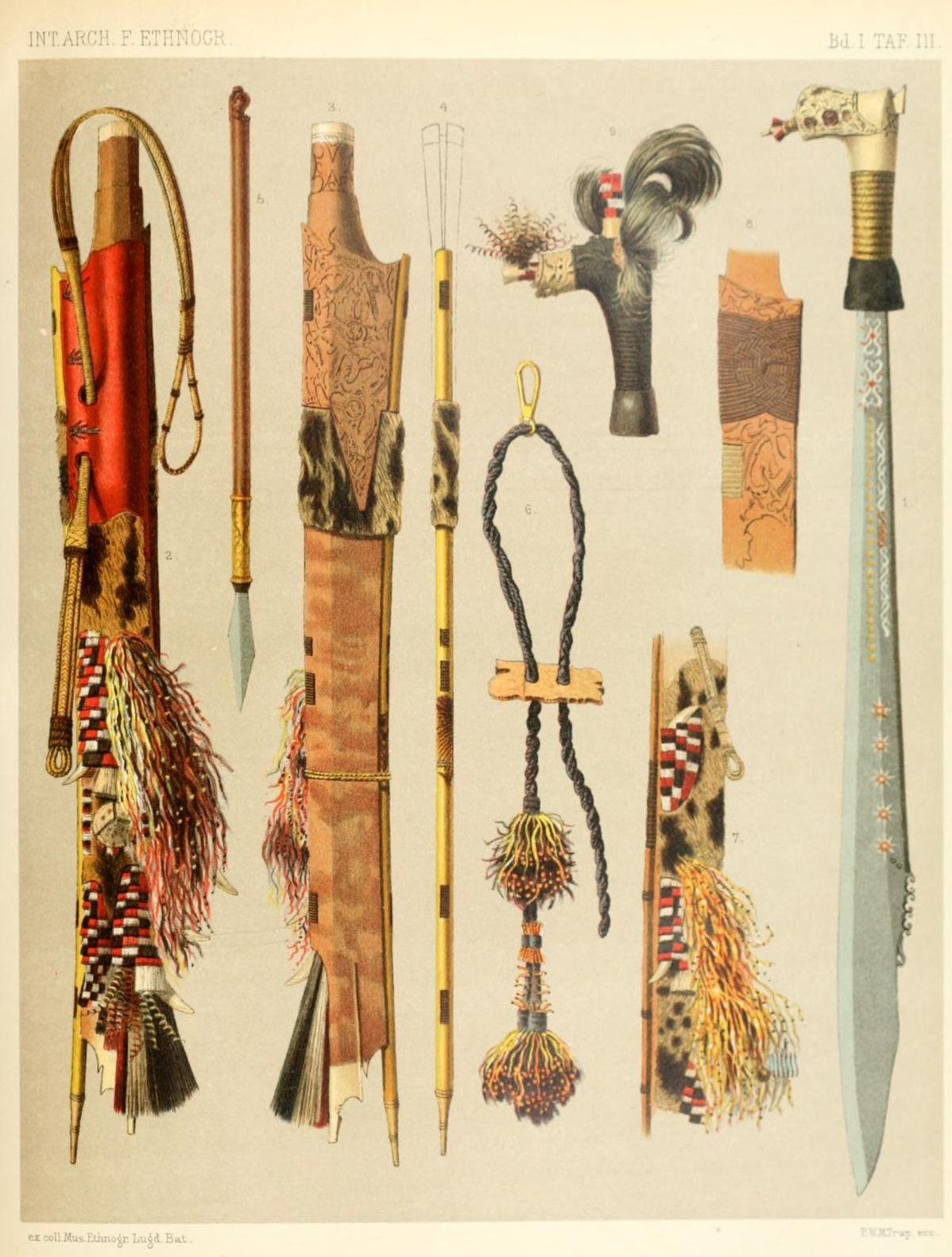
Various parts that makes up a complete mandau.

The mandau's blade is convex on one side and somewhat concave on the other side. It is mostly made of tempered metals, with exquisite vine-works and inlaid brass. The hilt is made from animal horns, such as deer horns, although some variations with human bones and fragrant wood also have been found. Both the hilt and scabbard are elaborately carved and plumed. Details of carvings vary from tribe to tribe, but mostly depict creatures or, if human bones were used, anthropomorphic deities. A mandau is often accompanied with a whittling knife, generally referred to as pisau raut.

=== Ambang ===
An ambang is a mandau made from common steel, often sold as a souvenir. Those who are not familiar with the mandau will often be unable to distinguish between a mandau and an ambang, because of their similar appearance. However the two are actually very different. The mandau's blade is engraved, and it is embedded with gold, copper or silver. It holds a stronger edge and is more flexible: it is said that the mandau is made from iron ore obtained from rocky mountains forged by skilled blacksmiths, whereas the ambang is made from ordinary steel.

== In popular culture ==
As a symbol of Dayak culture, the mandau is frequently depicted in various ways. The Indonesian provinces of East Kalimantan, West Kalimantan, and Central Kalimantan all featured a mandau in their provincial emblems. The paramilitary organization Mandau Talawang Pancasila was named after the weapon. The insignia of the military commands Kodam VI/Mulawarman and Kodam XII/Tanjungpura in Indonesia also featured them.

== See also ==
- Jimpul
- Pandat
- Langgai Tinggang
- Niabor
