= Parang (knife) =

Type of Southeast Asian knife

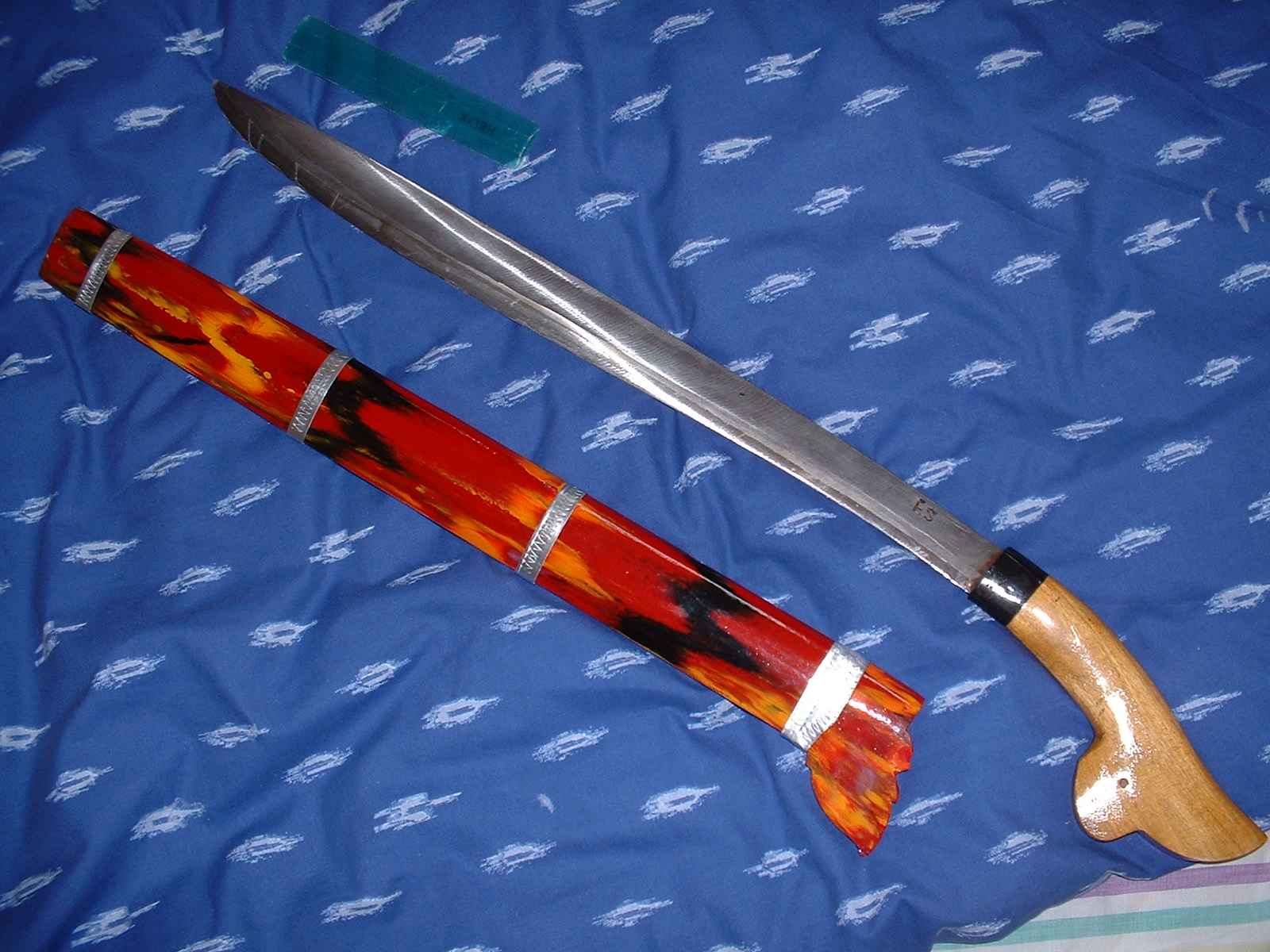
- A souvenir Indonesian parang pisang (banana parang)
- Type: Chopper (knife)
- Place of origin: Malay Archipelago

Service history
- Used by: Austronesians

Specifications
- Blade type: Single edge, convex edge
- Hilt type: Water buffalo horn, wood
- Scabbard/sheath: Water buffalo horn, wood

The parang (/ˈpɑːrɑːŋ/) is a type of knife used across the Malay Archipelago.

== Design ==
Typical vegetation in Southeast Asia is more woody than in South America, and the parang is therefore optimized for a stronger chopping action with a heavier blade and a "sweet spot" further forward of the handle, in comparison to a South American machete; the blade is also beveled more obtusely to prevent it from binding in the cut. This is the same rationale and (in practical terms) the same design as the Indonesian golok and very similar to the Filipino bolo. The parang blade ranges from 25 to 91 centimetres (10 to 36 in) in length.

The parang has a weight of up to 0.91 kilograms (2 lb) and the edge typically uses a convex grind. The parang has three different edges: the front is very sharp and used for skinning, the middle is wider and used for chopping, and the back end (near the handle) is very fine and used for carving. A parang handle is normally made out of wood or horn, with a wide end to prevent slips in wet conditions. The tang of the parang is usually of hidden tang design, but full tang designs are also available.

== Uses ==
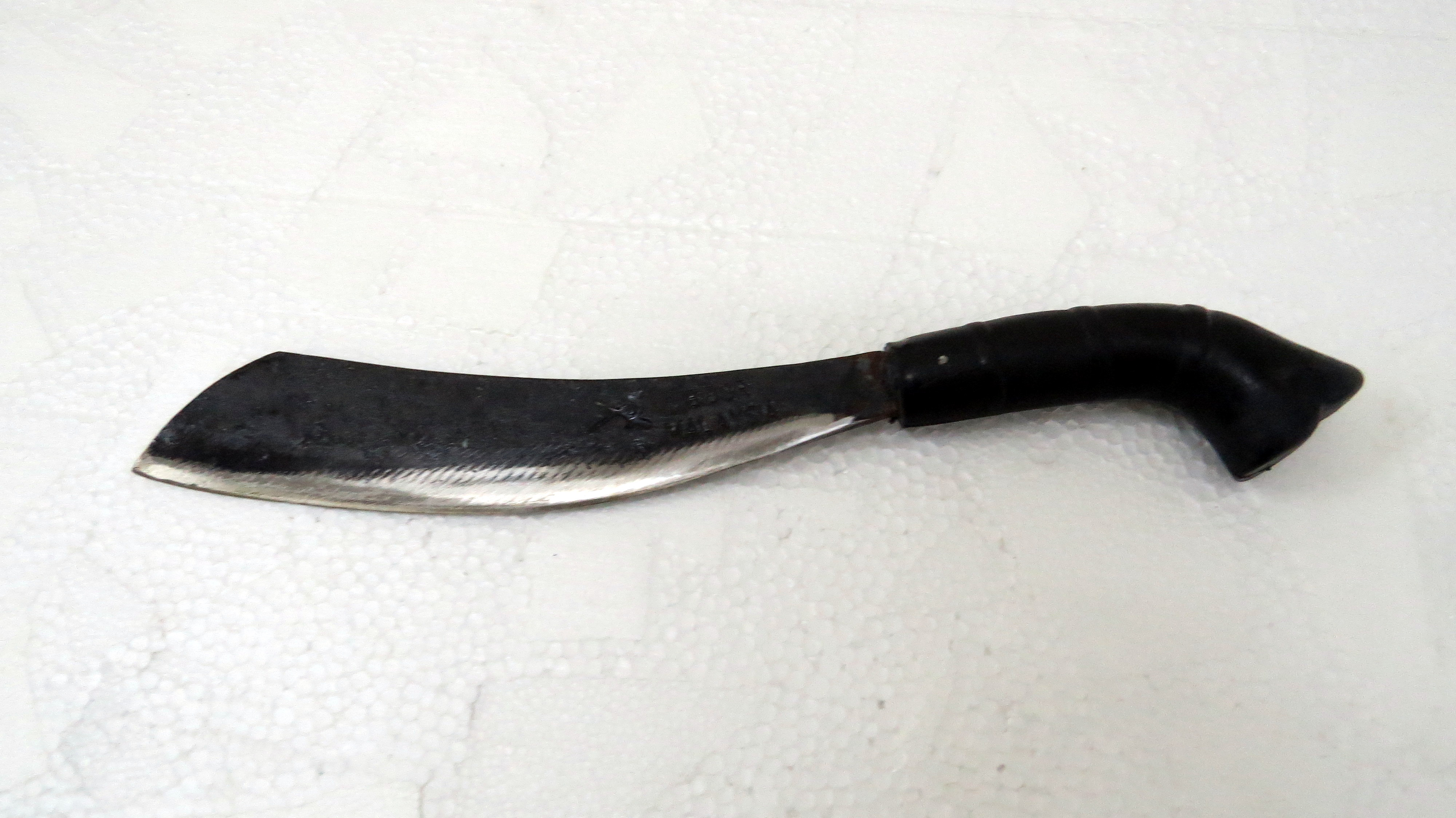
An example of a parang variant, the parang candung; which was popularized by Ray Mears.

Like the machete, the parang is frequently used in the jungle as well as being a tool for making housing, furniture, and tools. The parang has been noted in John "Lofty" Wiseman's SAS Survival Handbook for this use. Wiseman points out that by grinding three different angles in three separate regions along the Parang blade—a narrow angle at the tip for skinning and fine cutting work; a wide, chopping blade angle along the bow in the blade for axe work, and an all-purpose hunting/survival knife angle along the edge nearest the handle for general purpose work—the parang becomes a very useful, and compact all-purpose tool in the bush.

The weapon is related to the kampilan from the Philippines, which is referred to as parang kampilan in the Iranun language.

Parangs are historically recorded as being used as weapons against colonial powers. For instance, North Borneo guerillas fought with parangs against the Japanese in the Jesselton Revolt during the Japanese occupation of British Borneo.

== See also ==
- Kukri
- Kampilan
