= Niabor =

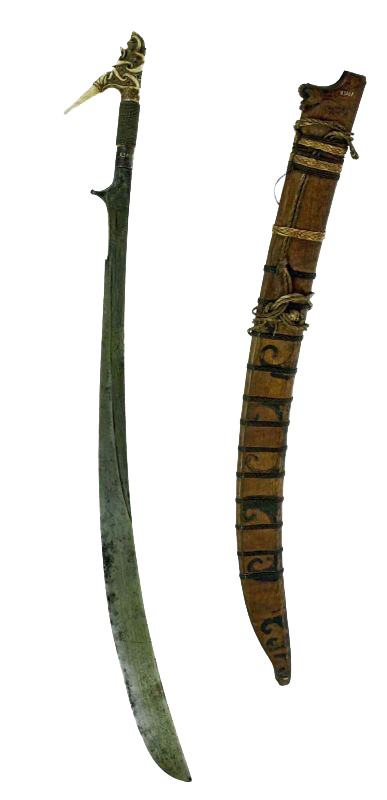
- A Niabor, pre-1887.
- Type: Sword, Cutlass
- Place of origin: Borneo: Brunei; Indonesia (West Kalimantan and Central Kalimantan); Malaysia (Sarawak)

Service history
- Used by: Dayak people (Iban / Sea Dayak)

Specifications
- Length: 60–90 cm (24–35 in)
- Blade type: Single edge, convex grind
- Hilt type: Antler/deer horn, wood
- Scabbard/sheath: Wood

A niabor (other names include beadah, naibor, nyabor, nyabur, parang njabur laki-laki) is a curved sword from Borneo, a characteristic weapon of the Sea-Dayaks.

== Description ==
The niabor's blade has a convex edge and concave back, broadening towards the tip so that the center of gravity lies at the point. The edge curves slightly toward the tip. The blade usually has one or more broken hollow sections and no midrib, and is usually not decorated. In some versions, a nose-shaped projection is forged to the blade, which is seated on the cutting edge. This projection, called kundieng, serves as a kind of parry and finger guard; it is typical of these swords. Below the finger guard, the blade is rectangular. This portion is called sangau. The portion between the finger guard and the hilt is called temporian. The hilt is made of antler or deer horn, like that of the mandau. The pommel is carved in the traditional way and never decorated with animal hair.

The niabor is very similar to another Sea Dayak sword called langgai tinggang. The name "niabor" should not be mistaken for parang nabur.

== See also ==
- Langgai Tinggang
- Mandau
- Pakayun
