= Langgai tinggang =

Langgai Tinggang
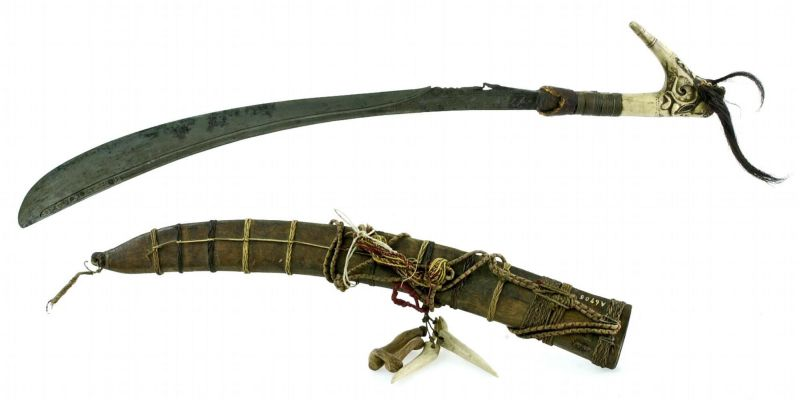
- Langgai tinggang, pre-1894
- Type: Sword
- Place of origin: Borneo: Brunei; Indonesia (West Kalimantan and Central Kalimantan); Malaysia (Sarawak)

Service history
- Used by: Dayak people (Iban / Sea Dayak)

Specifications
- Blade type: Single edge, convex grind
- Hilt type: Antler/deer horn, wood
- Scabbard/sheath: Wood

A Langgai tinggang (other names include langgi tinggang, mandau langgi tinggan) is a traditional sword of the Sea Dayak people, originating from Borneo. The name "langgai tinggang" means "the longest tail-feather of a hornbill".

== Description ==
This sword is almost identical to the niabor, but with a hilt resembling that of the mandau. The blade has a convex edge and concave back. On both sides, a broad rib runs from the finger guard to the tip. The finger guard is smaller than of the niabor and is further removed from the hilt. Unlike the finger guard of the niabor, the langgai tinggang's is similar to the mandau's. Another feature that separates the langgai tinggang from the niabor is that the pommel of the langgai tinggang is always decorated with animal hair.

== See also ==
- Mandau
- Niabor
- Pakayun
