= Puyi (disambiguation) =

Puyi (1906–1967) was the last emperor of China; a child emperor of the Qing dynasty and a puppet emperor of Manchukuo.

Puyi may also refer to:

- Bouyei people, an ethnic group in southeastern China and northern Vietnam, also spelled Puyi
  - Bouyei language, a Tai language
- Puyi Township, Guangxi (普益乡), a township in Yangshuo County, Guangxi, China
- Puyi Township, Yunnan (普义乡), a township in Ning'er Hani and Yi Autonomous County, Yunnan, China
- Puyi (footballer) (born 1994), Spanish footballer
