= Gantang =

Gantang may refer to:

== Units of measurement ==
- Gantang (Basilan), a Basilan measurement
- An Indonesian units of measurement
- A Malay unit of measurement
- A South African unit of measurement

== Places in China ==
- Gantang, Shuangfeng, Hunan
- Gantang, Jingzhou County, Hunan
- A village in Puyi Township, Yunnan
- A village in Huangshan District, Huangshan City, Anhui
- A township in Pingnan County, Fujian
- A town in Fu'an, Ningde, Fujian

== Other ==
- Gantang–Wuwei railway, a railway in China
  - Gantang railway station, a station on Gantang–Wuwei railway

== See also ==
- Bukit Gantang (disambiguation)
