= Culture of Basilan =

The Culture of Basilan are derived from the three main cultural ethnolinguistic nations, the Yakan, Suluanon Tausug and the Zamboangueño in the southern Philippines. Both Yakans and Tausugs are predominantly Muslim, joined by their kin from the Sama, Badjao, Maranao, and other Muslim ethnolinguistic groups of Mindanao, while the Zamboangueños are primarily Christian, joined by the predominantly Christian ethnolinguistic groups; the Cebuano, Ilocano, Tagalog and others. These three main groups, however, represent Basilan's tri-people or tri-ethnic group community.

== Yakan ==
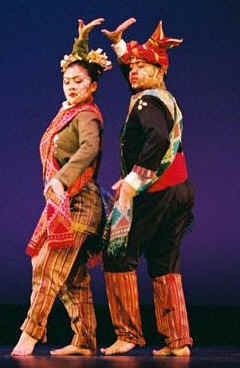
Filipino American dancers performing wedding dance of a Yakan couple in traditional costume.

The island is the homeland of the Yakans, a Filipino ethnic group or ethnolinguistic group widely regarded as having been descended from Orang Dampuans (Orang Dyaks, Tagihamas) of the Kingdom of Champa and eastern Indonesia, and recognized for their colorful costume.

The Yakan have designs or motifs used repeatedly in all their visual arts and crafts. The pussuk labbung is a sawtooth design used for cloth baskets and the native sword called kris. The bunga sama, used for table runners, monuments for the dead and on trunks, is a symmetrical design made of rectangular-shaped figures. The kabban buddi is a set of triangles, squares, and other geometric shapes used for cushions, pillows, casings, mats, and hats. The baggang kettan combines incised triangles and rectangles, and is used to decorate the kris. The ukil lagbas consists of a combination of various lines – wavy, crossed-wavy, and straight – used on shirts, windows of houses, and boats (Sherfan 1976:210–211).

Weapons such as knives and swords are part of the Yakan's visual arts. The punnyal is a small knife, which can be hidden within one's clothing. The taming is the traditional shield used along with two types of spears, the budjak and the sankil, now used only in war dances. The bangkung is another type of bolo seldom used nowadays. The pira is a traditional weapon used by little boys when going on a long journey. The barong and the kalis, although popular, are less valuable or admired among the Yakan (Sherfan 1976:156–160).

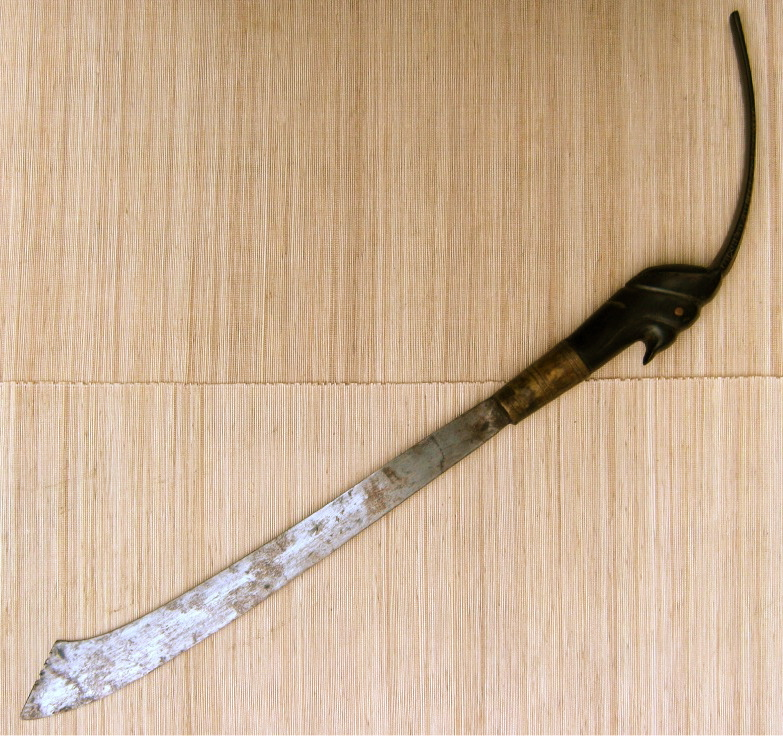
The pira, a Yakan sword with the characteristic highly elongated kakatua pommel

Yakan visual arts includes Yakan kitchen utensils and household implements. Metalware includes the talam, a beautifully decorated bronze tray, and the sanduk or ladle used for special occasions. Yakan basketry is both colorful and functional. The tutop is a food cover made of bamboo leaves. The peliyuk is a clay jar with cover used for cooking. The baling is a decorative clay jar treasured as heirloom. The kombo is a lidded container for rice storage. A lakal is a bamboo frame used to hold the cooking gadget when placed on the ground. The tempipih is a big basket carried on the back. A conical basket called the saan is used as a liquid strainer.

Baskets are also used to measure and weigh. The gantang is bigger than the government ganta. The batil measures nine gantang. The laga is 10 gantang. The ilug is 30 gantang. The lukung is equivalent to 100 gantang. An example of Yakan pottery is the poga, a covered clay jar used as water container (Sherfan 1976:201–204).

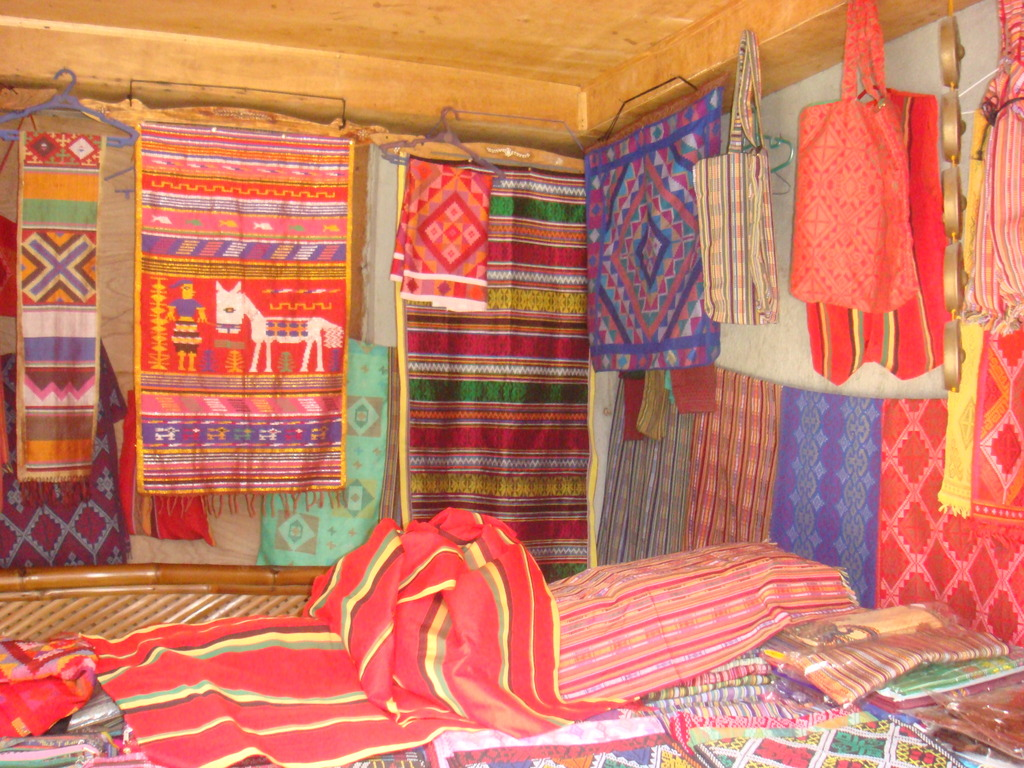
Yakan cloth on display at the Isabela City Pasalubong Center and at the Lami-Lamihan Yakan Center in Lamitan, Basilan

Yakan women are excellent weavers, and are famous for their beautifully woven traditional costumes of cotton and pineapple cloth. The basic garment for men and women consists of a tight-fitting upper garment with tight-fitting trousers called sawal. The shirt is open in front from lapel down to the waist, using up to 40 sequined or golden buttons. To close the shirt, a long string is crisscrossed from one button to the other so that when tightly drawn, the shirt closes from top to bottom. Usually, the shirt remains open since the string is often lost. Over the shirt, male and female wear a tight-fitting jacket, which is exquisitely embroidered in the front and back, with cuffs decorated with multicolored sequins.

The difference in male and female apparel lies in accessories. Men wear a hand-woven pis (head cloth) and a 15-m-long kandit (belt or sash) made of red cloth called gilim. The pis serves as "protection" from spears and knives during combat, and may be fastened around the trousers. The women wear a short skirt over the trousers, around which a rectangular, hand woven cloth is tied. This cloth is the most expensive part of their costume because it is woven in a tedious manner. Men and women wear the saruk, the Yakan hat worn to make one look more attractive and elegant. Some wear the hat over the turban and use it as a purse for betel nuts, tobacco, and money. Yakan warriors wear a bulletproof shirt prepared by hadjis and imams who write Arabic script all over the shirt (Sherfan 1976:160, 205–207).

Ornaments such as necklaces may be worn as charms. A crocodile tooth polished with a hole at the base is believed to bring good luck when worn as a necklace. The Yakan also wear amulets against bullets. These contain unreadable symbols, are wrapped in black cloth, sewn in triangular form, and tied around the neck. Belts made of snake bones are strung together to protect them against bodily pain. One charm that protects them from sicknesses due to evil spirits is the manik tegiyas – a necklace or bracelet made of the fruits of a flower beaded together. The manik sembulan is made of a bamboo stem cut into short pieces, strung together either as a necklace or bracelet, and serving as added protection against sickness inflicted by evil spirits. To gain more strength against evil spirits, men and women wear the anting-anting. This consists of a string with a piece of cloth containing beads as pendant (Sherfan 1976:143–147).

The Yakan also wear functional gadgets. The pegupaan is a bamboo container for all the paraphernalia for chewing betel nut. The lutuan, a small bronze box with engravings carried at the waist, has a similar function (Sherfan 1976:203).

A unique form of visual arts is the facial make-up done on brides and grooms. After creating a foundation of white powder, the make-up artists proceed to paint dots and lines in various patterns on the faces, creating the effect of formal and elaborate masks which match the ornate costumes of the celebrants.

The Yakan have a rich musical tradition, which may be broadly divided into instrumental and vocal. Yakan musical instruments are made of bamboo, wood, and metal. Their musical instruments also demonstrate the influence of the traditional cycle of rice production in their lives. Several instruments are used in each stage of rice production. The daluppak is a digging stick with a bamboo clapper. The kopak-kopak is a bamboo clapper on a stick. The Kwintangan Kayu is percussion instrument consisting of wooden beams laid after the planting season, to enhance plant growth. The wooden tuntungan is a percussion plank with jar resonators, also played during the harvest season for thanksgiving.

The gabbang is a bamboo split into five, and arranged like a xylophone. Small children near the fields played it in order to guard the crops against prying animals. The kwintangan batakan is an earlier form of gabbang which has six, seven, or nine bamboo pieces. The suling is a bamboo mouth flute used by the men in courting women. Another bamboo instrument used by the men in expressing love or admiration is the kulaing. The Kulintangan or kwintangan consists of several bronze gongs arranged according to size, and used during celebrations such as weddings and graduations. Any individual played it in the home and after work, for self-expression and relaxation. The agong is a percussion instrument used to announce marriage or for tolling the dead. The jabujabu (djabu-djabu) is a type of drum that summons the people to prayer (Nicolas 1977: 100–108; Sherfan 1976:195–199).

There are three main types of Yakan vocal music: the lugu and other melodies used in reading the Quran and other religious books; the kalangan or songs which may be further reclassified into Jamiluddin and Lunsey; and the katakata, nahana, yaya, lembukayu, and sa-il, among others. The kalangan, jamiluddin, katakata, nahana, and yaya are sung solo, while the lunsey, sa-il, meglubulebu seputangen, and lembukayu involves singers from two groups singing solo as they answer each other. The kalangan, jamiluddin, lunsey, and lembukayu are courting songs. The katakata, jamiluddin, and nahana may also narrate the history of the Yakan people. The katakata is a long traditional song narrating the lives, loves, and historical backgrounds of people who lived during early times. The Yakan believed that such stories originated from people who lived in another world. The katakata is sung only at night, at a big gathering with food served by the host or hostess. The singing, in episodes, may last for several nights. The singer lies on a mat, the back supported by several pillows. The audience, either sit or lie around the singer. The jamiluddin relates love stories. At present, it is also sung when families discuss marriage engagements. Both the katakata and jamiluddin are sung by wise men and women of the tribe.

The sa-il and lunsey are sung during a wedding ceremony, with messages revolving around good advice regarding married life. Another type of sa-il is sung during the magtammat or Quranic graduation. During social gatherings, the maglebu-lebu seputangan is sung, by a group of men answering a group of women. Each group has a soloist who sings the kalangan, expressed in metaphors. The yaya is a lullaby. The magsambag is a method of studying the Quran in which a Murid or student follows the Quranic singing of the teacher. The student and teacher are not allowed to sing together.

Then there are the songs, which the Yakan sing during daily activities. In keeping watch over rice fields, they sing some forms of the jamiluddin and kalangan. While resting at home, they also leisurely sing the katakata, jamiluddin, and nahana. Children at play imitate the adults in singing the kalangan, jamiluddin, lembukayu, and lugu (Nicolas 1977:97–100). One popular Yakan dance adopted from the Tausugs Pangalay is called mangalay. The dance is accompanied by the kunlintangan kayu and played by three people. In the Yakan "bumblebee" mimetic dance usually performed by a male dancer, a searcher successfully finds honey with the aid of a torch. He overeats, and the result is a stomachache (Orosa-Goquingco 1980:175). Another example of a mimetic dance is the tahing baila, which imitates the movement of a fish (Tiongson 1991:236). At weddings, the tumahik or war dance is to be performed by the groom as well as male relatives of both the groom and the bride. Dressed in Yakan finery, the dancer uses a spear and a shield to fight an imaginary enemy to the music of the kulintangan.

== Tausug ==
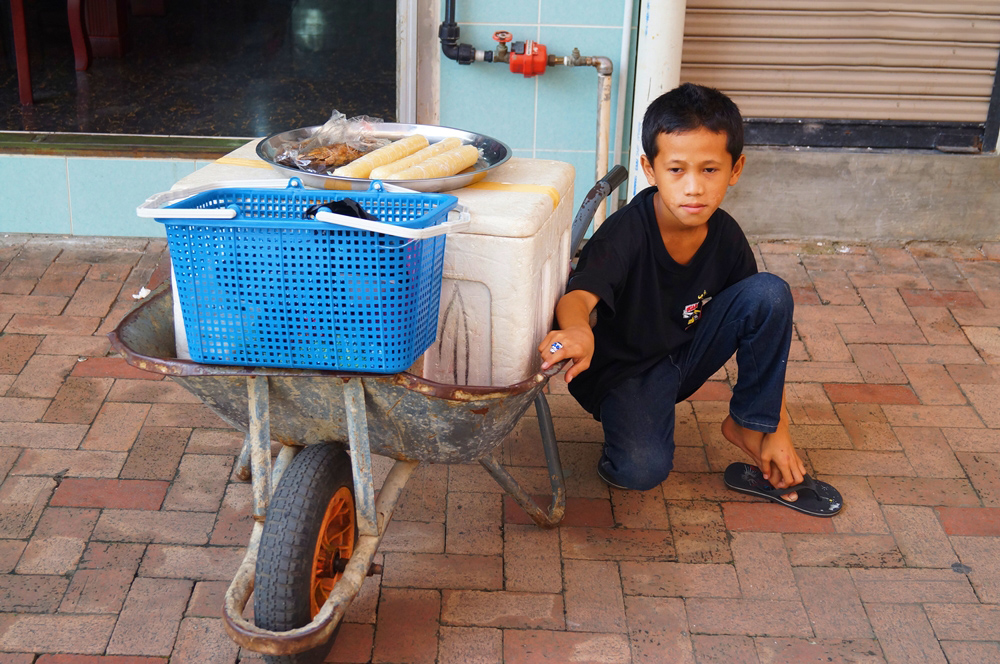
A Tausug child vendor selling piyutu (traditional steamed tapioca cylinders)

The Tausug are the Yakan's traditional rivals in the Sulu Archipelago. Based primarily in the island of Jolo, the Tausug built a powerful maritime confederation of Datus and Rajas extending from the Sulu Archipelago to Palawan and North Borneo. They inhabit Basilan's coastal areas, specifically around the island's southwest and northwestern communities. Known to be fierce warriors and sailors throughout the 16th to the 19th centuries, they withstood Spanish incursions for over 350 years, succumbing only in 1876, and then to the Americans in 1915.

"Tausug" derives from tau meaning "man" and sug meaning "current," and translates into "people of the current." It refers to the majority Islamized group in the Sulu archipelago, their language, and culture. The Tausug, are predominant in the northern part of Sulu province, i.e., Jolo Island and the neighboring islands of Pata, Marunggas, Tapul, and Lugus, and to a lesser extent in Siasi and Pangutaran (Arce 1963:3). The province of Sulu derives its name from sulug or sūg which in Tausug means "ocean current," while Sulu's capital Jolo is the Spanish corruption of Sulu.

The Tausug speak Bahasa Sūg, a Malayo-Polynesian language related to the Visayan variety spoken in Surigao, and write in a Malayo-Arabic script known as Jawi or sulat sūg.

Tausug visual arts are represented by carvings, metalworks, woodworks, tapestry and embroidery, mat making and basketry, textile and fashion, pottery, and other minor arts (Szanton 1963). In general, Tausug visual arts follow the Islamic prohibition of representing human or animal forms. Consequently, Mindanao and Sulu have developed ukkil or abstract motifs which are carved, printed, or painted into various media. These motifs are suggestive of leaves, vines, flowers, fruits, and various geometric shapes.

Tausug carving is best exemplified by the sunduk or grave marker. Although not as stylized as those of the Samal, the Tausug sunduk are wood or stone carvings of geometric or floral forms. Women's grave markers are flatter with carved geometric designs, those of the men are more floral. Sakayan or outriggers present yet another media for Tausug carving. Adornments are usually made on the prow and sometimes on the sambili or strips across the hull. The carvings are done either on the boat itself, or on a separate piece of wood which is then attached to the vessel. Abstract manok-manok (bird) motifs are the most common. Ajong-ajong/sula-sula are carved tips supporting the wrapped sail; the hidjuk (dark cord) on the sangpad (prow-plate) also serve as decoration. Carved saam or cross—pieces supporting the outriggers are called the mata (eyes) of the boat. Colors used on the finished carvings are yellow, red, green, white, and blue (Szanton 1973:33–47).

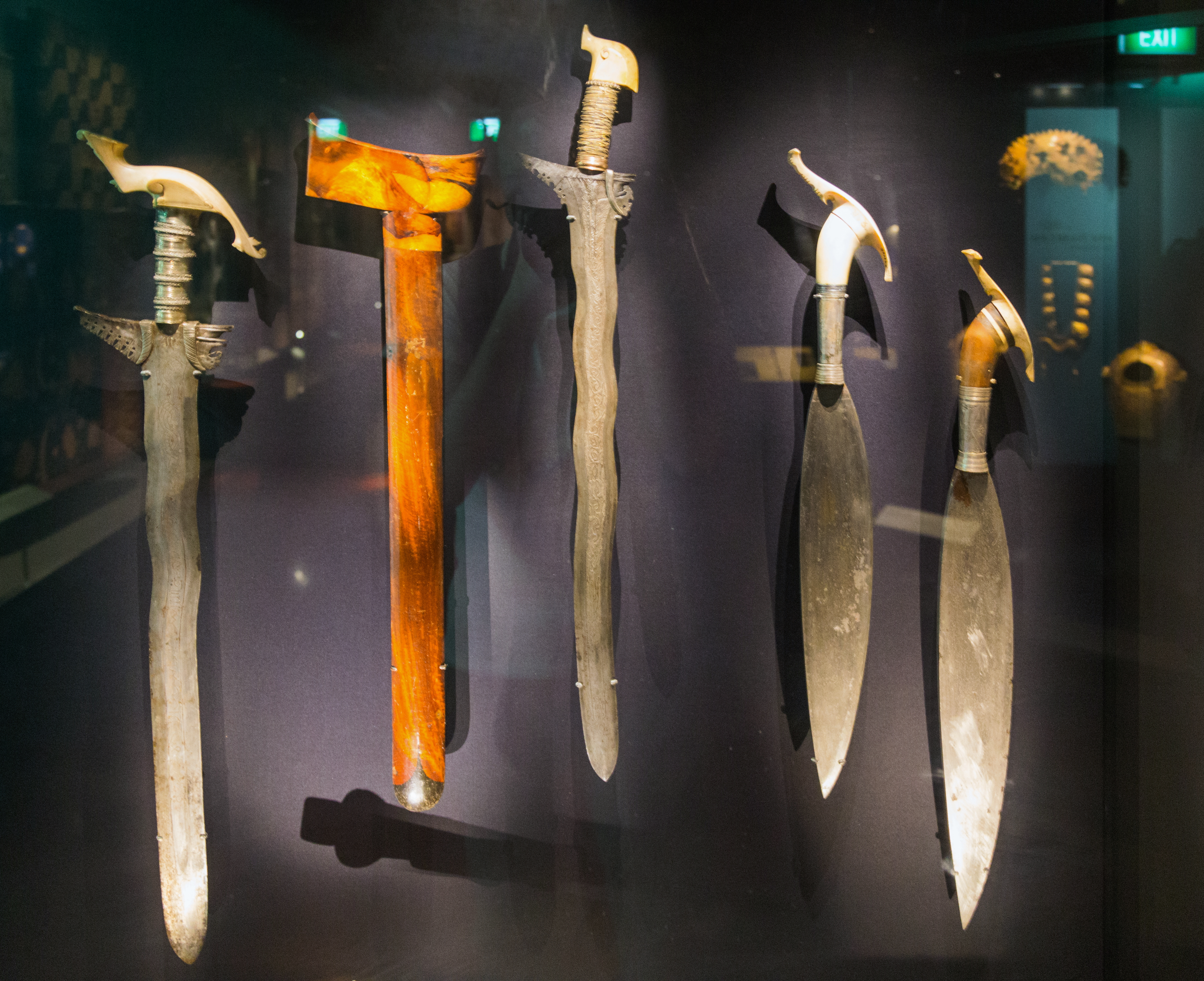
The most common Tausūg weapons: the kalis and the barong with the characteristic Tausūg kakatua (cockatoo) pommel design

Tausug mananasal or blacksmiths produce bolo, kalis, and barong (bladed weapons). Fishing implem-ents are also made, such as the sangkil (single-pointed spear) and the sapang (three-pronged spear). The more expensively fashioned blades have floral and geometric incisions; the ganja or metal strips which lock the handle and the blade are a decorative as well a functional device. Bronze casting is not as well developed as it is in Lanao. Among the several functional pieces produced were the batunjang (standing trays) and the talam (flat trays). Gold and silver-smithing for jewelry remain lucrative. Items produced by the local goldsmith include the singsing (ring), gallang (bracelet), gantung liug (necklace), bang (stud earring), aritis (dangling earring), pin (brooch), and gold teeth. In the past, tambuku (buttons) made of gold or silver decorated the traditional male and female costumes and were made with exquisite designs, often inlaid with palmata (semiprecious stones or gems). Among the favorite palmata are mussah (pearl), intan (diamond), kumalah (ruby) (Szanton 1973:47–51; Amilbangsa 1983:142–157).

An example of Tausug woodwork is the puhan (wooden handle) of bladed weapons which may be simple or decorated with gold or silver wires, strings, and rings. For the barong, the handle is wrapped in cord and metal at the far end, and carved and polished at the upper part. At the end of the grip is a protrusion carved with ukkil designs. The handle of the kalis, which the Tausug terms as daganan kalis, can also be profusely decorated, sometimes with mother-of-pearl. Taguban (scabbards) are beautifully carved and are covered with budbud (fine rattan). Other woodworks include kitchen utensils and furniture items like beds, chests, and wardrobes (Szanton 1973:51–54).

There are two types of tapestries that the Tausug use to hang as house decoration: the luhul or canopy that hangs from the ceiling, and the kikitil/buras or wall tapestry. The ukkil design used for both is first traced on a starched white cloth which is then cut and sewn over a red, green, yellow, or blue background material. The ukkil design of the luhul, for example, is in the form of a tree with spreading leaves, vines, flowers, and branches. About 1 m wide, the kikitil is a smaller version of the luhul and is hung on the wall. The size of the room determines the length of the kikitil which is divided into various units corresponding to individualized panels. The ukkil design may be similar in all units.

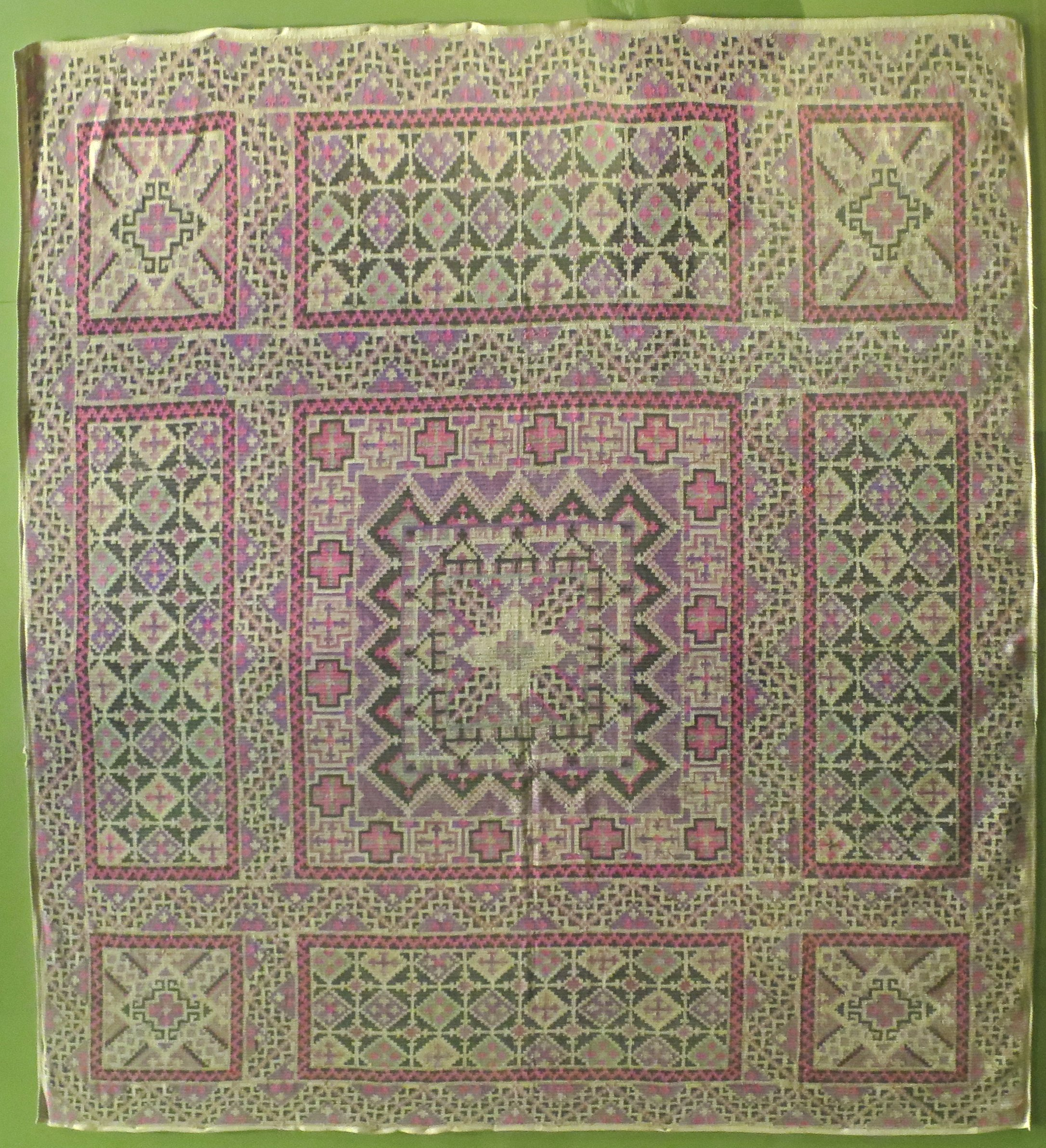
A Pis siyabit (headscarf) made of silk and tapestry weave at the Honolulu Museum of Art.

Embroidery, another Tausug visual art form, is used to ornament tablecloth, pillow cases, bed spreads, and the habul tiyahian (embroidered tube). The brightest silk thread is often used for the habul to underscore the design, which follows the ukkil pattern. Used as bedding or underbedding, baluy or mats are usually made from pandanus. Double layering provides decoration and color; a simple base mat is sewn under a colored panel which has been dyed with one or more colors. The designs the Tausug usually adopt are the geometric patterns found on the pis siabit (male headgear) or the plaid known as baluy palang. Mat designs are memorized and passed on to the next generation.

The Tausug male hat is made by weaving nito with bamboo strips over nipa leaves. Thus it is three-layered and woven in a sawali pattern. Structure and form are provided by the nipa leaves and the light bamboo frame, while texture and feel are supplied by the nito strips. The open-weave layer assures ventilation inside. Another example of Tausug basketry is the small nito container, 18–20 cm in diameter, used either as a coin or as a personal basket. If used as a personal basket, it comes with cover and handle. As a coin basket, it is supplied with a loop to allow it to be carried on a finger. A slit serves as the coin slot. Aniline dyes-magenta, blue, violet, and green-color the nito strips (Lane 1986:193-194).

Hablun or textile weaving is another well-known art form among the Tausug. The most popular woven material is the pis siabit or male headgear, which is about 1 sqm in size and distinct for its geometric designs. Because of its intricacy, one pis takes about three to four weeks of work. Only women weave the pis and other materials such as the kambut (sash) and kandit (loincloth and sash), which unfortunately have completely disappeared (Szanton 1973:6.4–65). The female biyatawi is a blouse made of plain material like satin and is ornamented with tambuku (gold or silver buttons) on the breast, shoulders, and cuffs. It is usually worn with sawwal (loose trousers) of silk or brocade. A habul tiyahian is either slung across the shoulder or allowed to hang on one arm (Amilbangsa 1983:76–113).

The patadjung is an all-purpose skirt worn by both men and women. It has various other uses: as a turung or headcover, sash or waistband, blanket, ham-mock, and others. Resembling a big pillow case, the cloth for a patadjung has designs which are variously inspired: batik prints from Indonesia and Malaysia, checks and stripes from India, dunggala or stylized geometrical and floral patterns from Sarawak, Indone-sia, or Malaysia, calligraphic motifs from the Middle East (Amilbangsa 1983:82).

Tausug men wear the sawwal kuput or sawwal kantiyu (tight and loose trousers respectively), and match this with the badju lapi, a collarless short-tailored jacket similar to the biyatawi. The sleeves of the badju lapi are either long or "three-fourth's" with slits at the wrists. The badju lapi is likewise ornamented with tambuku on the breast, shoulders, and cuffs. The legs of the sawwal kaput are skin-tight down to the ankles, and have 22.5 cm slits on each side, which are also decorated with buttons. A kandit (handwoven or embroidered sash) tied around the waist serves to keep the sawwal kuput in place. A pis siabit is either tied around the head or left to hang on the shoulder (Amilbangsa 1983:114–130).

Function and simplicity define Tausug pottery. Decorations are limited to simple geometric lines as the emphasis has always been on the quantity not quality of the product. Examples include pots, vases, jugs, and various pieces of kitchenware (Szanton 1973: 61–63).

Tutup or plate covers are made by Tausug men and women; smaller pieces are called turung dulang riki-riki, and are used as wall adornment. Tutup mea-sure about 75 cm in diameter and are made of coconut leaves inside, and silal or buri leaves outside. Colored pandan leaves are sewn on the exterior and serve as decoration (Szanton 1973:64).

Calligraphy is found printed or carved on doors and gates, as well as on tapestries. Musical instruments, especially the gabbang (native xylophone), are also decorated by the Tausug (Szanton 1973:65).

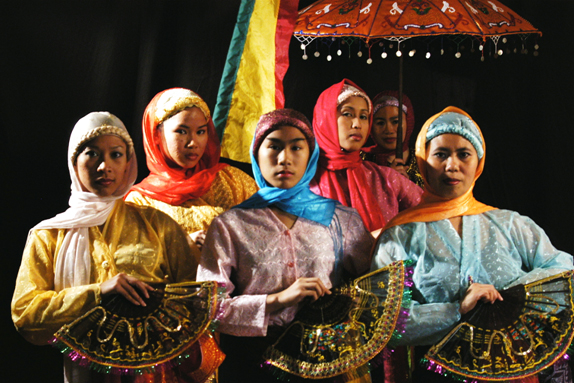
Tausug women in a traditional Tausug fan dance, Kinding sindaw.

Various musical instruments, played solo or as an ensemble, provide the Tausug with music. Most notable is the kulintangan ensemble consisting of two gandang (drums), a tungallan (large gong), a duwahan (set of two-paired gongs), and the kulintangan (a graduated series of 8 to 11 small gongs). At least five players are needed to play the ensemble which is used to accompany dances or provide music during celebra-tions (Kiefer 1970:2).

Other popular instruments are the gabbang (na-tive xylophone) and the biyula (native violin). With 14 to 24 keys divided into seven-note scales, the gabbang has become the most popular musical instrument in Sulu. It is used to accompany Tausug vocal music such as the sindil. The tune produced when the gabbang is played solo by a man or woman is called tahtah.

The biyula is similar to but larger than the western violin. It consists of four strings played by a bow made of horsehair. Traditionally played by men, the biyula, with the gabbang, accompany the sindil (Kiefer 1970:2)

Flute music is associated with peace and travel. It represented by the following less popular instruments: the saunay (reed flute), suling (bamboo flute), and kulaing (jaw harp). The saunay is essentially a six-holed slender bamboo, 1.5 mm in diameter, capped by a sampung simud (mouthguard). A resonating chamber made of palm leaves is housed in the mouthguard. The suling is a larger version of the saunay. It is a 60-cm long bamboo with a 2-cm diameter. Like the saunay, it has six fingerholes (Kiefer 1970:4).

The repertoire for Tausug instrumental music include: the gabbang tahtah (gabbang with biyula accompaniment); the kasi-lasa, lugu, and tahtah (biyula songs); the sinug kiadtu-kari (kulintangan); the tiawag kasi (saunay music), the tahtah (suling music); and others (Kiefer 1970). Kalangan or Tausug vocal music can be divided into narrative and lyric songs, and further into the lugu and the paggabang traditions. The luguh tradition denotes unaccompanied religious songs, while the paggabang tradition applies to "more mundane" songs that are accompanied by the gabbang and biyula (Trimillos 1972).

Narrative songs tell a story and include all the sung kissa like the parang sabil. Lyric songs express ideas and feelings and consist of the langan batabata (children's songs), the baat (occupational songs), the baat caallaw and pangantin (funeral and bridal songs, respectively), the tarasul (sung poems), the sindil (sung verbal jousts), the liangkit (from langkit or "chained"), and the sangbay or song to accompany the dalling-dalling dance.

The langan batabata are more specifically lullabies. They have a soft and relaxing melody (Tuban 1977:210). Baat and kalangan are the same, the latter being the more general term to refer to singing. The baat taallaw have a melancholic melody. The baat pangantin are also known as langan pangantin. With a soothing melody, they are used to reassure a bride and to console a friend (Rixhon 1974a:51).

The sindil (sung verbal jousts) belong to the gabbang tradition and are performed by both sexes conducting an extemporaneous battle of wits. Teasing, jokes, and innuendos flow into the verses, the better ones applauded by the audience (Kiefer 1970: 10).

The liangkit are long solo pieces accompanied by the gabbang and biyula. Unlike the sindil, they are not performed extemporaneously. The subject of the liangkit is wide-love, war, nature, and others. The Tausug lelling, adopted from the Samal, are part of the liangkit tradition, but are sung to the music provided by a guitar. They relate and comment on current events. One good ex-ample is the lelling narrating the entry of the Moro National Liberation Front forces into Jolo town in February 1974.

The art of singing to the dalling-dalling dance is called pagsangbay. The song usually dictates the movement that the dancers should follow.

The lugu or sail tradition is associated with religious rituals and rites of the life cycle such as wed-dings, births, paggunting, pagtammat, and funerals. It is characterized by dahig or jugjug (high vocal tension). The tempo is slow with long sustained and stressed tones. Although usually performed by women, the lugu can also be sung by men (Trimillos 1974).

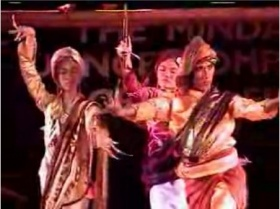
A group of folk dancers performing the traditional Pangalay dance.

The most well-known dance of the Tausug is the pangalay. It is the basic style from which the movements of various dances in Sulu and Tawi-Tawi are derived. The pangalay is danced by either sex, alone or together, and is usually accompanied by the kulintang ensemble. The movement of the pangalay is concentrated on the thighs, knees, ankles, toes, waist, shoulders, neck, elbows, wrists, and fingers. The torso is usually kept rigid, moving upward or downward as the flow of the dance demands. The feet is firmly planted on the ground and move in small shuffling steps (Amilbangsa 1983:14, 62). The pangalay dances are distinctive in their use of the janggay (metal nail extenders) to underscore hand movements. The extended fingers are stiff and set apart from the thumbs.

Another well-known Tausug dance is the dalling—dalling, where handkerchiefs or fans are used. A sing-er usually accompanies the dance by describing the various movements of the dancer. The song is known as the sangbay and the singing. pagsangbay. Some of the songs used are "Lingisan/kinjung-kinjung," "Dalling-dalling". The development of the dalling—dalling is attributed to a native Tausug by the name of Albani who became a famous proponent of the dance (Amilbangsa 1983:42).

Tausug martial-art dances are performed by men and include the langka-silat and the langka-kuntaw. The langka-silat simulates a fight and is usually per-formed with two or three other dancers. The langka—kuntaw is a dance of self-defense, resembling the martial arts of China, Japan, and Burma (Amilbangsa 1983:32–35).

A Tausug occupational dance is the linggisan which depicts a bird in flight; the taute, which shows a fisher diving for the prickly catfish; and the suwa—suwa, which shows dancers imitating the swaying of lemon trees (Amilbangsa 1983:28).

== Zamboangueño ==
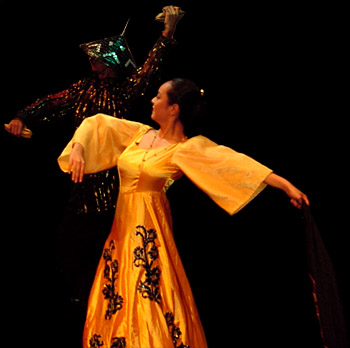
Jota Zamboangueña, traditional Zamboangueño dance

Zamboangueño Chavacano, also variously known as Zamboangueño, has been known for quite to be both a Castilian-based creole language and an ethnolinguistic nation or ethnolinguistic group born officially on June 23, 1635. It is also one of the six (6) dialects of Chavacano. Some of which like the Viasayan Chavacano, have already died off just a few years after the surrender of the Spanish. Chabacano in Luzon stayed on a little longer. These are found in the Ermita district of Manila known as Ermitense dialect (Spanish Criollo), Cavite City known as Caviteñ dialect (Spanish and Tagalog) and Ternate known as Bahra dialect (Spanish-Portuguese, Tagalog and Malay). These Chavacano speakers, were decimated during the Japanese occupation, easy targets because of their lighter skin and obviously Western tongue.

The Chavacanos de Zamboanga o Zamboangueño, however, are rooted in the Spanish-Jesuit settlement that grew around Fuerte de San Jose established in 1635. The Zamboangueño Chavacano of today is the result of centuries of cultural interaction and intermarriage between and among three (3) main racial/ethnic groups: (1) Visayan, specifically the original 1,000 Cebuanos brought in from Cebu to build the Spanish fortress (as well as the many Cebuanos and Ilongos who followed soon after), (2) the Christianized natives, mostly Subanen, Tau Laut (Samal) and Yakan converted and tended to by the enterprising Jesuits; and (3) Castilians (Spaniards, Mexicans and Peruvians). Later infusions by other languages such as Ilocanos Tagalogs, Sama, Badjau, Suluanon Tausug, et al. in the country and around the world further enriched the Zamboangueño Chavacano language.

Of all these, the Spanish culture had the strongest impact – about 80% of Zamboangueño culture is anchored on España and its three centuries of presence. The greatest number of Zamboangueño profess the Catholic faith, hewing closely to their avowedly Hispanic heritage.

The Zamboangueños inhabit the northern coasts of the island, mostly residing in the urban centers of Isabela and Lamitan cities, they are joined by other Christian ethnolinguistic groups in these areas, usually the Bisaya Sugbuanon (Cebuano), Bisaya-Ilonggo, Ilocano and Tagalog. They own most of the agricultural lands on the island, and is the group with the highest literacy, highest per capita incomes, and lowest poverty incidence on the island.

Zamboangueño courtship traditions are elaborate and regulated by a long list of required social graces. For example, a perfectly respectable Zamboangueño gentleman would not sit unless permitted to do so by the woman's parents, he then had to endure questions pertaining to his lineage, credentials, and occupation. Finally, the courtship curfew, and the need to cultivate the goodwill of all the members of the woman's family were paramount considerations before any headway could be made in pursuing a Zamboangueña senorita's hand in marriage.

Zamboangueño songs and dances are derived primarily from Spanish/Iberian performances. Specifically, the Jota Zamboangueña, a Zamboangueño version of the quick-stepping flamenco with bamboo clappers in lieu of Spanish castanets, are regularly presented during fiestas and formal "tertulias" or other Zamboangueño festivities.

Likewise, Zamboangueño traditional costumes are closely associated with Spanish formal dress. Men wear close-necked jackets, "de baston" pants, and European style shoes, complete with the de rigueur "bigotillos" (mustache). More recently, Chavacano men have adapted to wearing the formal Barong Tagalog, worn by men throughout the Philippines. Zamboangueño women claim ownership of the "mascota", a formal gown with a fitting bodice, her shoulders draped demurely by a luxuriously embroidered, though stiff, panuelo and fastened at the breast by a brooch or a medal. The skirt tapers down from the waist but continues on to an extended trail called the "cola". The "cola may be held on one hand as the lady walks around, or it may likewise by pinned on the waist or slipped up a cord (belt) that holds the dainty "abanico" or purse.

Of late, the Zamboangueños de Basilan have acquired more modern tastes in food, clothing and customs, usually based on the generally preferred American/Western model. The traditional Zamboangueño dress has been limited to formal functions, replaced by the more common shirt, denim jeans and sneakers for men, and shirts, blouses, skirts or pants, and heeled shoes for women. Likewise, Taglish, a mix of Tagalog and English is increasingly accepted as a modern and convenient variant of either the more difficult (for Zamboangueño) Tagalog or the more formal English. An even more confusing mix of Tag-lish and Zamboangueño Chavacano is likewise spoken especially by the younger generations of Zamboangueño.

== See also ==
- Culture of the Philippines
