= Bangkung =

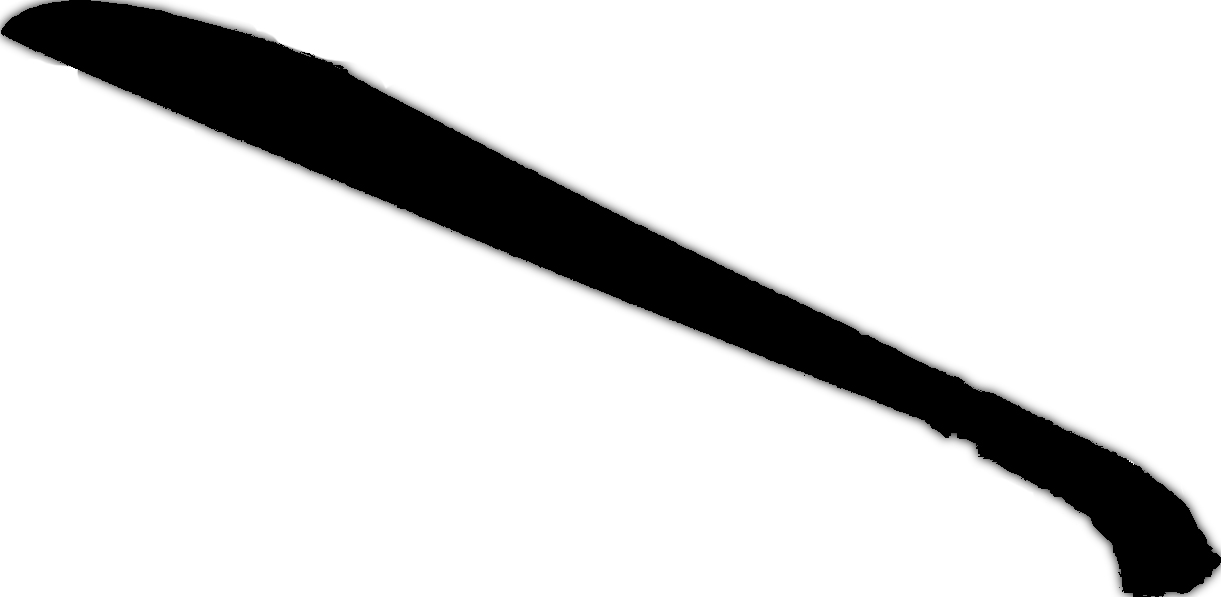
- Silhouette of a Typical Bangkung
- Type: Sword
- Place of origin: Sulu Archipelago, Philippines

Specifications
- Blade type: Single-edged, straight to slightly convex
- Hilt type: hardwood, woven rattan, metal
- Scabbard/sheath: hardwood, woven rattan

The bangkung or bangkon is a slashing weapon, meant to deliver hacking-type blows. It is a short sword originating in the Sulu Archipelago of the Philippines. The bangkung was used primarily by the Moro people of the Sulu and is not associated with Moros in other areas such as Mindanao, although it is sometimes found in coastal regions. While the bangkung is a very effective sword, it was not popular unlike the panabas and the pirah and for this reason it is one of the most rarely found Moro edged weapons. Few were produced and even fewer survive.

== Appearance ==
The unusual shape of the bangkung blade makes it easily identifiable. The overall size of bangkung varies, ranging from 50 to 75 cm (20 to 30 in), although a few shorter and longer specimens have been proposed as examples.

=== Blade ===
The profile of the blade is similar in profile to that of the kampilan, a sword that had much more widespread use among Moro warriors. The bangkung blade as a straight, unsharpened spine and single-sharp edge that is typically straight slightly convex shape, bending upwards toward the tip. The width of the blade tapers in profile with gradual increase in size towards the tip. This has the effect of moving the point of maximum percussion (i.e., directed force of a blow) somewhat forward along the blade. The point of the bangkung blade begins with a curve downward towards the tip. This may be very gradual, with a longer curve as in the "Wharncliff" tip style, or shorter as in the "Sheepsfoot" manner. In all cases, the back, curved portion of the tip is unsharpened. The thickness of the bangkung blade is greatest close to the hilt and then tapers distally towards the tip. Bangkung blades are sharpened on both sides, giving the blade a triangular cross-section. The steel of a bangkung blade is laminated steel, made from layers of differing types of steel that are forged together in the final blade.

=== Hilt ===
The hilt of a bangkung is made of wood. Older bangkung may have a hilt pommel carved as a stylized cockatoo head with beak and crest. Those produced after World War II typically have a horse hoof pommel. Hardwood burl is often used in hilts, but a variety of woods are found. To secure the blade in the hilt, the portion nearest the blade is compressed using a metal sleeve, as on the barung, or tightly wrapped and lacquered rattan bindings.

=== Scabbard ===
The scabbard for a bangkung is typically made of two wooden boards lashed together with braided rattan. The inner part of these boards is carved to allow insertion and proper fit of the blade. As the blade widens towards the tip, so does the scabbard. The Sulu or Palawan types of scabbards are most common, although some basket-type scabbards also exist. These latter scabbards may be non-Moro replacements (e.g., from Basilan in the Sulu Archipelago). Scabbard decoration ranges from very simple carvings to elaborate okir designs.

== See also ==
- Kampilan
- Weapons of Moroland
