= Puyi (footballer) =

Spanish footballer (born 1994)

Personal information
- Full name: Ane Pérez Etxeberria
- Date of birth: 25 October 1994 (age 32)
- Place of birth: Errenteria, Spain
- Position: Defender

Team information
- Current team: Eibar
- Number: 2

Senior career*
Years	Team	Apps	(Gls)
2011–2018	Oiartzun	47+	(3+)
2019–2024	Eibar	61	(0)
2024–2025	Atlético Villalonga FF	19	(0)
- * Club domestic league appearances and goals as of 17:09, 31 October 2021 (UTC)

Ane Pérez Etxeberria (born 25 October 1994), most commonly known as Puyi, is a Spanish footballer who has played as a defender for Eibar and Atlético Villalonga FF.

== Club career ==
Puyi started her career at Oiartzun.
