= Puyi Township, Yunnan =

Puyi Township 普义乡
- Township
- Location in Yunnan
- Coordinates: 23°1′19″N 101°20′27″E
- Country: People's Republic of China
- Province: Yunnan
- Prefecture-level city: Pu'er
- Autonomous county: Ning'er Hani and Yi Autonomous County
- Time zone: UTC+8 (China Standard)

Puyi Township (simplified Chinese: 普义乡; traditional Chinese: 普義鄉; pinyin: Pǔyì Xiāng) is a township under the control of Ning'er Hani and Yi Autonomous County, Yunnan, China. As of 2020, it has eight villages under its administration:

- Puyi Village
- Tiantouzhai Village (田头寨村)
- Manya Village (曼芽村)
- Pusheng Village (普胜村)
- Puzhi Village (普治村)
- Duanjin Village (端金村)
- Gantang Village (干塘村)
- Sanqiutian Village (三丘田村)
