= Barong (sword) =

Muslim Filipino weapon

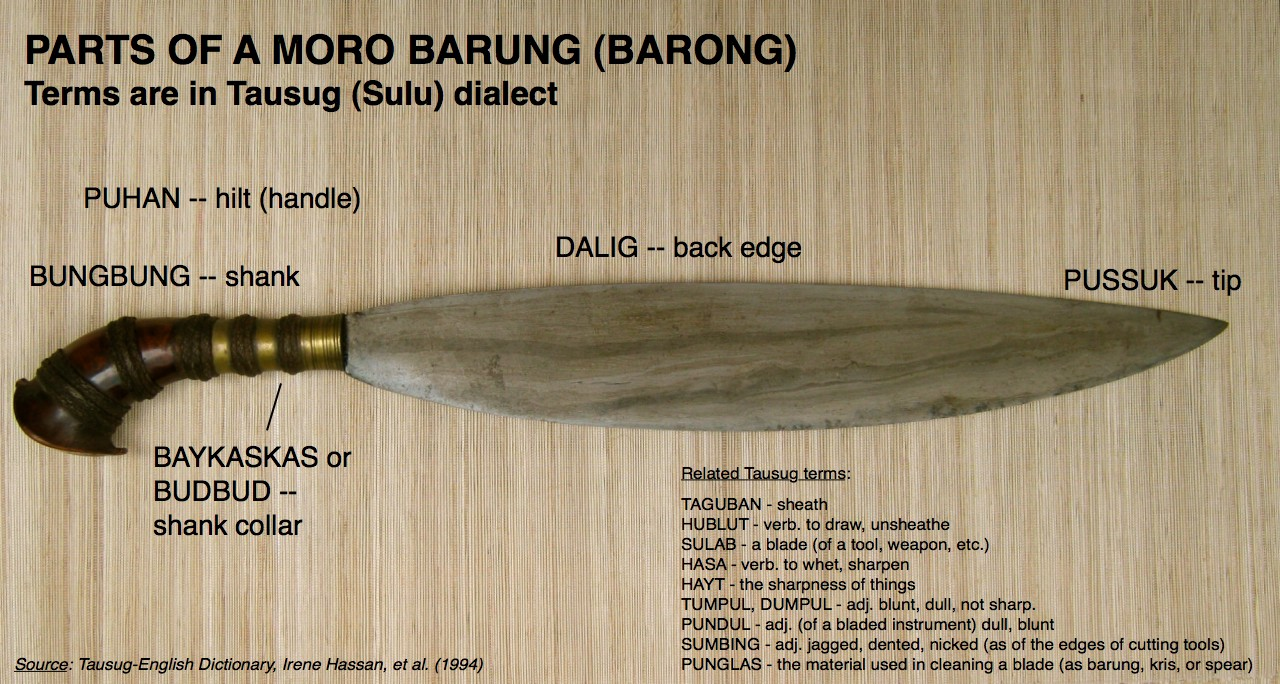
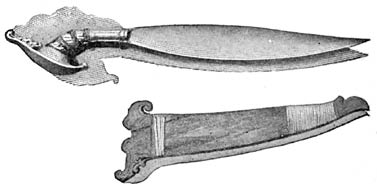
- Top: parts of a Barong sword; Bottom: A Moro barong sword and scabbard (c. 1905)
- Type: Sword or knife
- Place of origin: Philippines

Specifications
- Length: 56 cm
- Blade length: Older Blades: 8 - 22 inches (20 to 56 cm); Newer Blades: 18 to 22 inches (46 to 56cm)
- Blade type: Single-edge Blade
- Hilt type: Ivory, Carabao horn or Kamagong
- Scabbard/sheath: Wood

The barong is a thick, leaf-shaped, single-edged blade sword. It is a weapon used by Muslim Filipino ethnolinguistic groups like the Tausug, Sama-Bajau, or Yakan in the Southern Philippines.

== Description ==
=== Blade ===
Barong blades are thick and very heavy, with the weight enhancing the sword's slicing capability. Barong blade lengths range from 8 to 22 inches (20 to 56 cm), with an average of 14 inches. Newer blades, on the other hand, tend to be longer, measuring 18 to 22 inches (46 to 56 cm). Damascene patterns are also thick, but again most often not as controlled as the more widely known kalis.

Barong blade lamination patterns
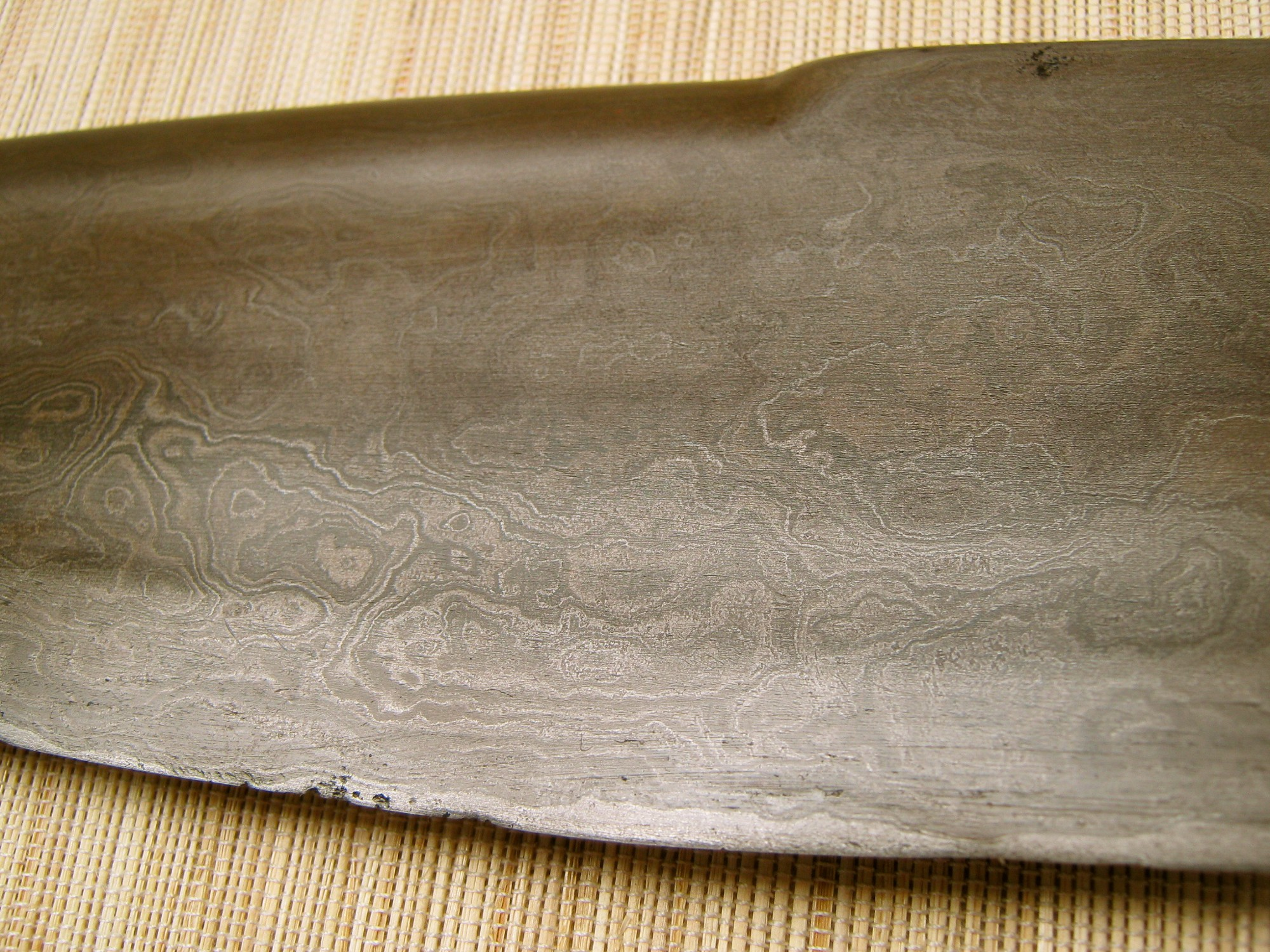

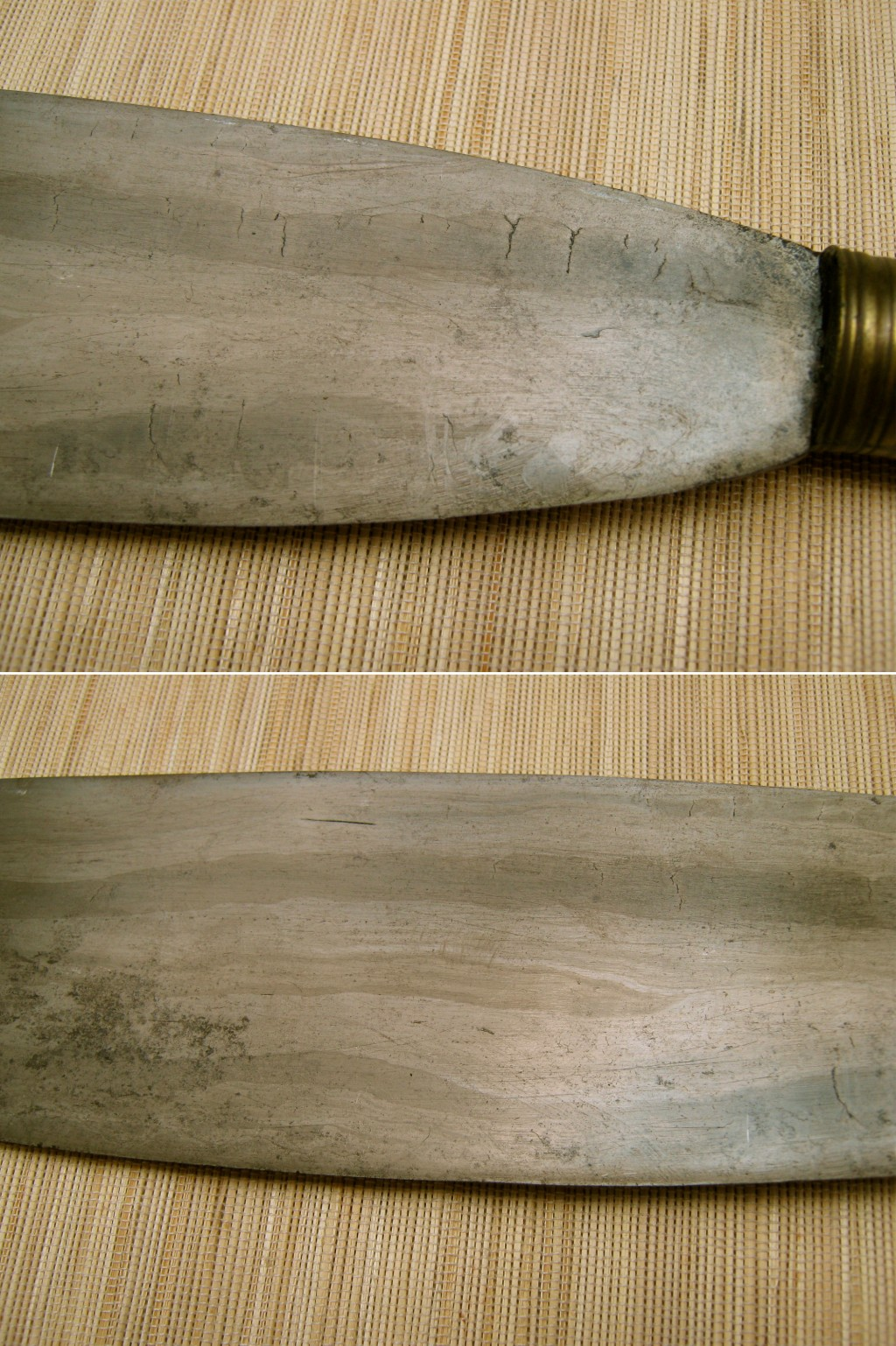

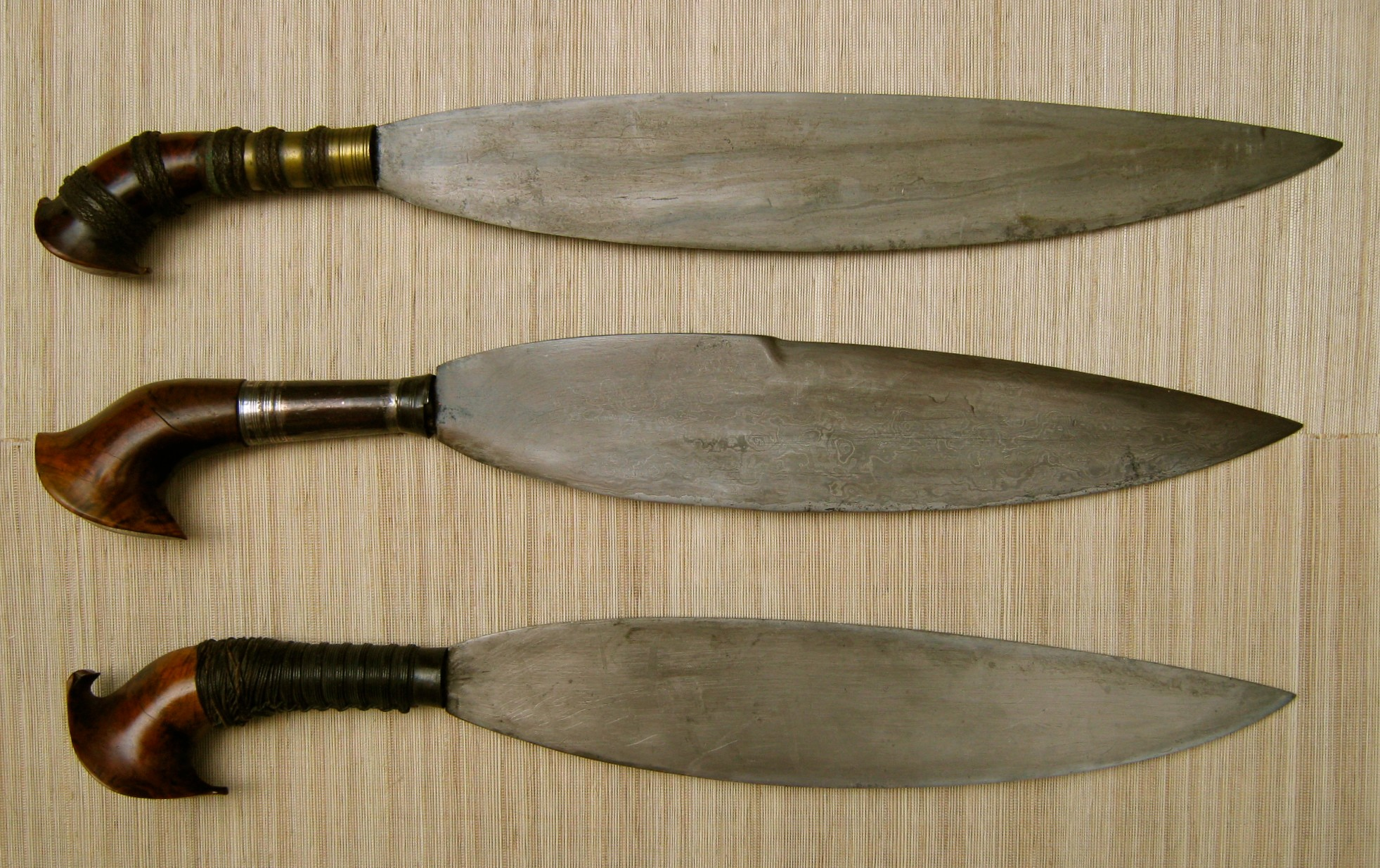
Three examples of 19th-century antique Moro barong

=== Hilt (handle) ===
Most handles have a silver sleeve and lacquered braided fiber rings that sit on top. Nobility hilts were made of ivory, carabao horn, or kamagong (Philippine ebony). Other barong swords have less elaborate hilts and are smaller. Common motifs include the cockatoo (kakatua) and the sea serpent (naga). The long metal ferrule is most often made of silver, though copper, brass, and swaasa are also used. Barongs used in World War II may also have aluminum ferrules. The ferrule is typically around 8 cm (3 inches) long. Often, the ferrule will have lacquered, braided natural-fiber rings to aid grip. Sometimes these fiber rings were on top of the ferrule, but often what would appear to be a solid metal ferrule would, in fact, be many metal bands that alternate between the fiber bands.

Cockatoo pommels were typically made of banati. Higher-end barongs belonging to the upper classes often had large, elaborately carved junggayan (elongated) cockatoos. Barongs for the lower classes, and the ones used for fighting, have less elaborate cockatoo pommels of much smaller sizes, often featuring de-emphasized crests or beaks (and on fighting versions, mere vestigial elements of the crest and beak motifs). At one period near World War II, cockatoo forms changed. Crests became more triangular and began to emerge directly from the back of the pommel, whereas older cockatoos had crests that flowed from the butt-plain of the pommel. Also, beaks became more massive and more rectangular. Barongs used by juramentados, or those who had taken the rite of Magsabil, often would feature smaller blades with normal-sized hilts.

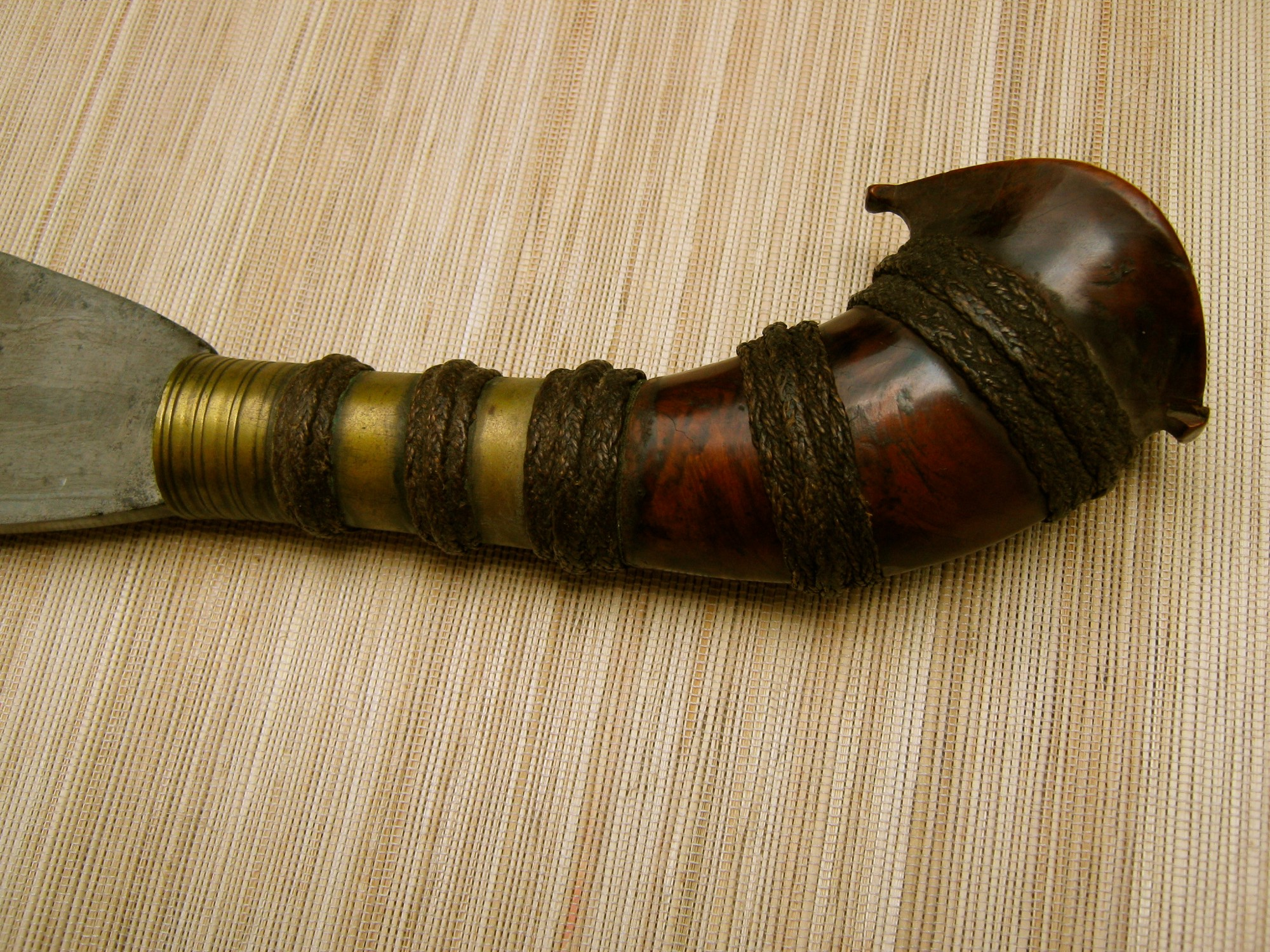
Barong hilts commonly have a metal sleeve (ferrule) and lacquered cord wound around the hilt, for a better grip

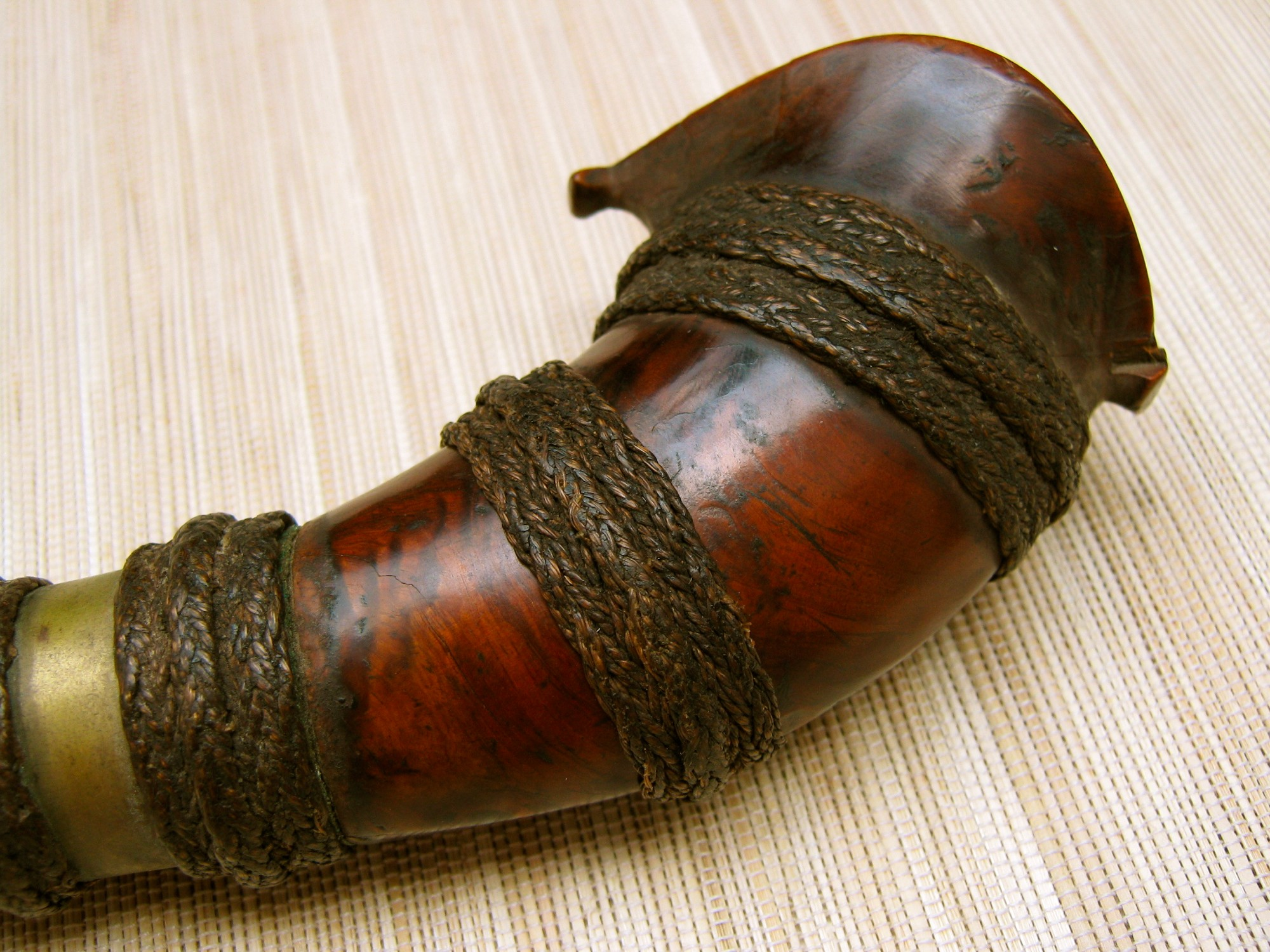
Banati (bunti) is the wood of choice for Muslim barong and kris.

=== Scabbard ===
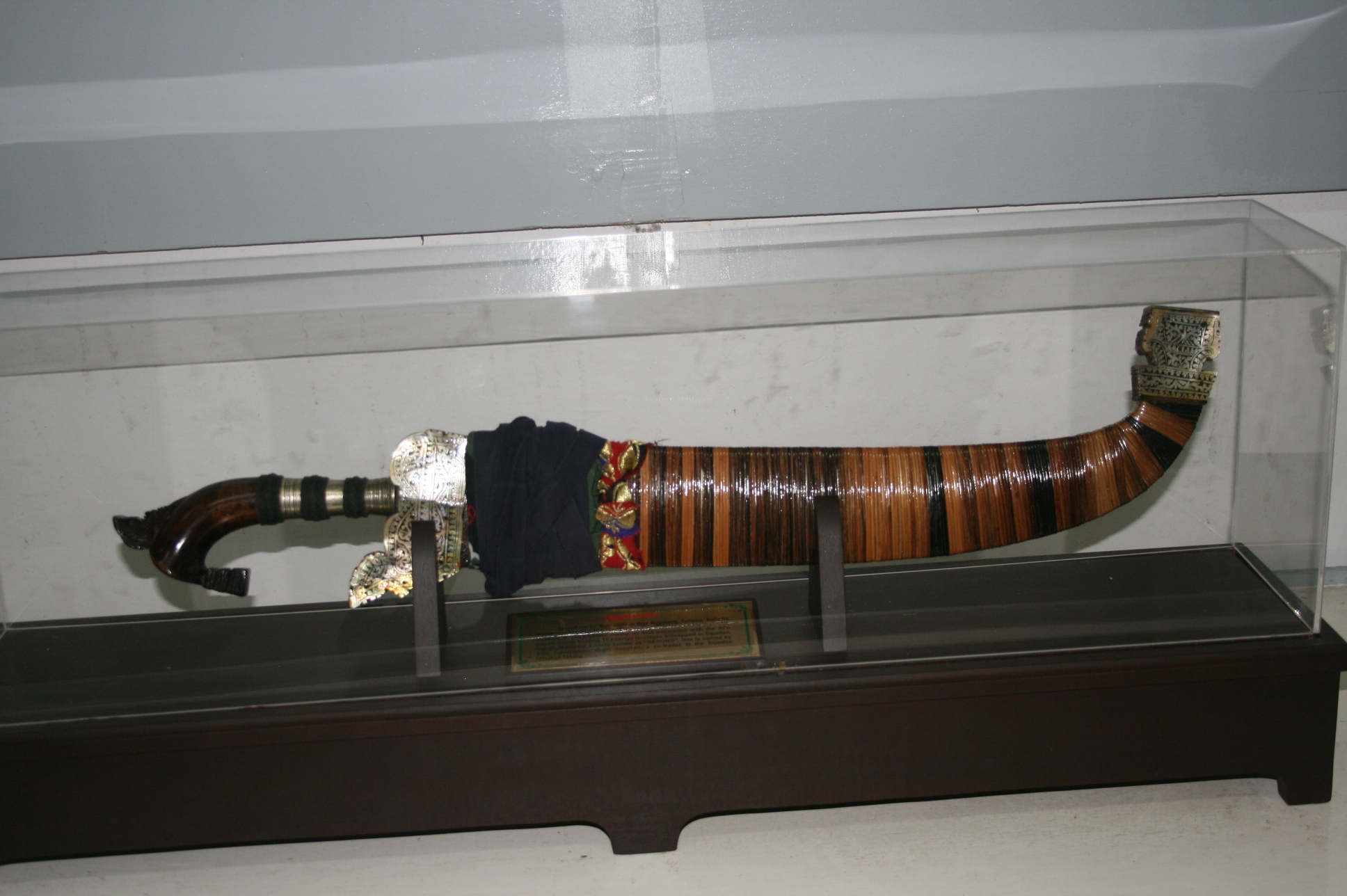
A barong previously owned by an Abu Sayaf commander, Mujib Susukan, now on display at the Philippine Military Academy Museum

Older barong scabbards tended only to be partially wrapped with large rattan lashings, while newer barong scabbards feature a full wrap of thin rattan. Also, the scabbards of older barong featured thinner, flat boards, whereas post-World War II barong scabbards are of much thicker stock and feature a central ridgeline. The terminus on modern-made scabbards tends to turn upward to a more dramatic degree, often at a near 90-degree angle, and features squared tips. As with kris scabbards of the post-World War II era, mother-of-pearl inlays begin to appear at the throat and tips of barong scabbards as well.

== See also ==
- Kampilan
- Pirah
- Smatchet
