= Turko-Mongol sabre =

Type of cavalry sabre

Turko-Mongol Sabre
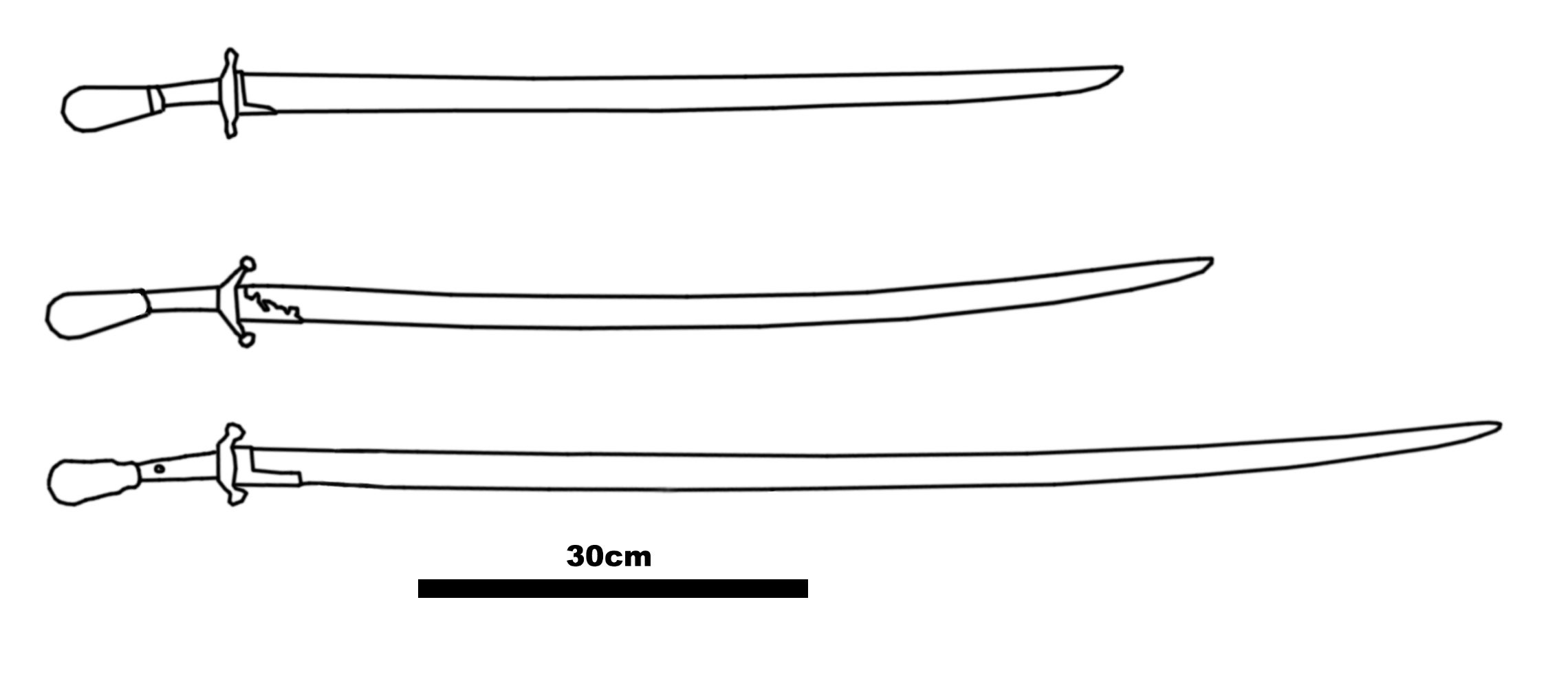
- Type: Cavalry sabre
- Place of origin: Eurasian steppes

Service history
- Used by: Mongol and Turkic nomads

Production history
- Designed: 8th–14th century

Specifications
- Length: 75–100 cm (30–39 in) (blade)

The Turko-Mongol sabre, alternatively known as the Eurasian sabre or nomadic sabre, was a type of sword used by a variety of nomadic peoples of the Eurasian steppes, including Turkic and Mongolic groups, primarily between the 8th and 14th centuries.

== History ==
One of the earliest recorded sabres of this type was recovered from an Avar grave in Romania dating to the mid-7th century.

== Design ==
Although minor variations occur in size and hilt, they are common enough in design across five centuries that individual blades are difficult to date when discovered without other context. These swords were likely however, already influenced by swords used by others, such as the various Chinese swords.

These swords measured between 75 and 100 centimetres (30–39 in) in blade length and bore a gentle curve, leading to a pointed tip useful for thrusting. They were designed for use on horseback and neighbouring peoples frequently encountered these blades at the hands of Turkic raiders.

A common feature of the hilts was a bend just below the pommel. This is partly due to construction of the pommel and tang and partly a feature intended to aid a mounted warrior swinging the weapon at an opponent. The hilt bore short quillions that often swept slightly forward, but could also be straight.

Just after this, the hand guard on the forte of the blade, called a tūnkǒu (吞口) in Chinese, lay a feature typically of copper or iron. This was made as a sleeve of metal to wrap around the blade, designed to aid the sword sealing into the scabbard. Some early tunkou of high status swords were gilded and decorated with patterns.

Later swords that descended from these blades bore non functional tunkou that were ornamental and at times just etched onto the blades.

== Influence on later swords ==
=== Chinese swords ===
With the Mongol invasion of China in the early 13th century and the formation of the Yuan dynasty, the curved steppe sabre became a greater influence on Chinese sword designs.

Sabres had been used by Turkic, Tungusic, and other steppe peoples of Central Asia since at least the 8th century, and it was a favoured weapon among the Mongol aristocracy. Its effectiveness for mounted warfare and popularity among soldiers across the entirety of the Mongol empire had lasting effects.

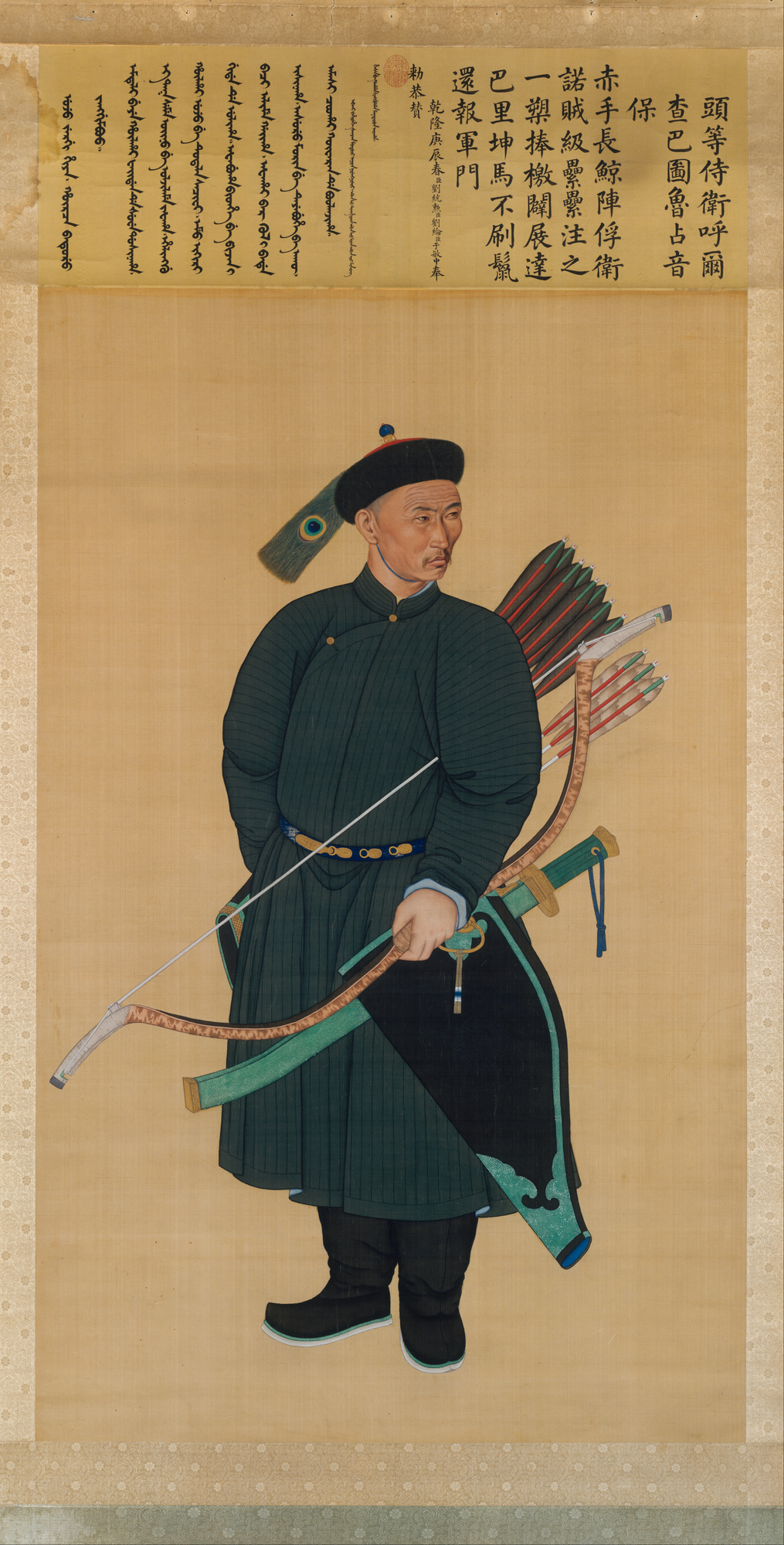
Zhanyinbao, an Imperial bodyguard, wearing a sheathed dao (peidao/waist sabre). (1760)

In China, Mongol influence lasted long after the collapse of the Yuan dynasty at the hands of the Ming, continuing through both the Ming and the Qing dynasties (the latter itself founded by an Inner Asian people, the Manchu), furthering the popularity of the dao and spawning a variety of new blades.

Blades with greater curvature became popular, and these new styles are collectively referred to as "waist sabre" (Chinese: 佩刀; pinyin: Peidao; lit. 'Armed knife') (Note: Literal translation: "worn sabre" or "carried sabre". This is actually a loose term referring to all sabres worn on belt or waist in Chinese language, not merely indicates to Turko-Mongol sabres and other curved sabres).

During the mid-Ming these new sabres would completely replace the jian as a military-issue weapon.

=== Islamic swords ===
Early Arab swords were all straight and mostly double edged (similar to European arming swords' blades).

Although Turko-Mongol sabres have been found among a Turkic slave of the Samanid Empire, straight swords continued to be more popular outside of certain groups (such as the Seljuks) as that was the traditional style of sword Muhammad wore.

After the Mongol invasion across the Muslim world in the 13th century, the curved designs became more popular in particular with the Ottomans in Anatolia. The Ottomans continued to use curved swords, developing them further until they distinguished a distinct heavy-bladed version which would become the kilij in the first half of the 15th century.

The Mongol-style sabres continued to remain in use in Persia until the late 16th century, at which point they developed into the recognizable shamshir. The Mughal invasion of Afghanistan and India brought these sabres to the subcontinent, developing into the pulwar and talwar respectively in the 16th century. While these Islamic blades often retained tunkou showing their Turko-Mongol heritage, even by the 15th century the device had become a stylized decorative element.

The Ottoman yataghan, while not bearing a traditional curved sabre blade, did still bear the tunkou indicating its Turko-Mongol heritage.

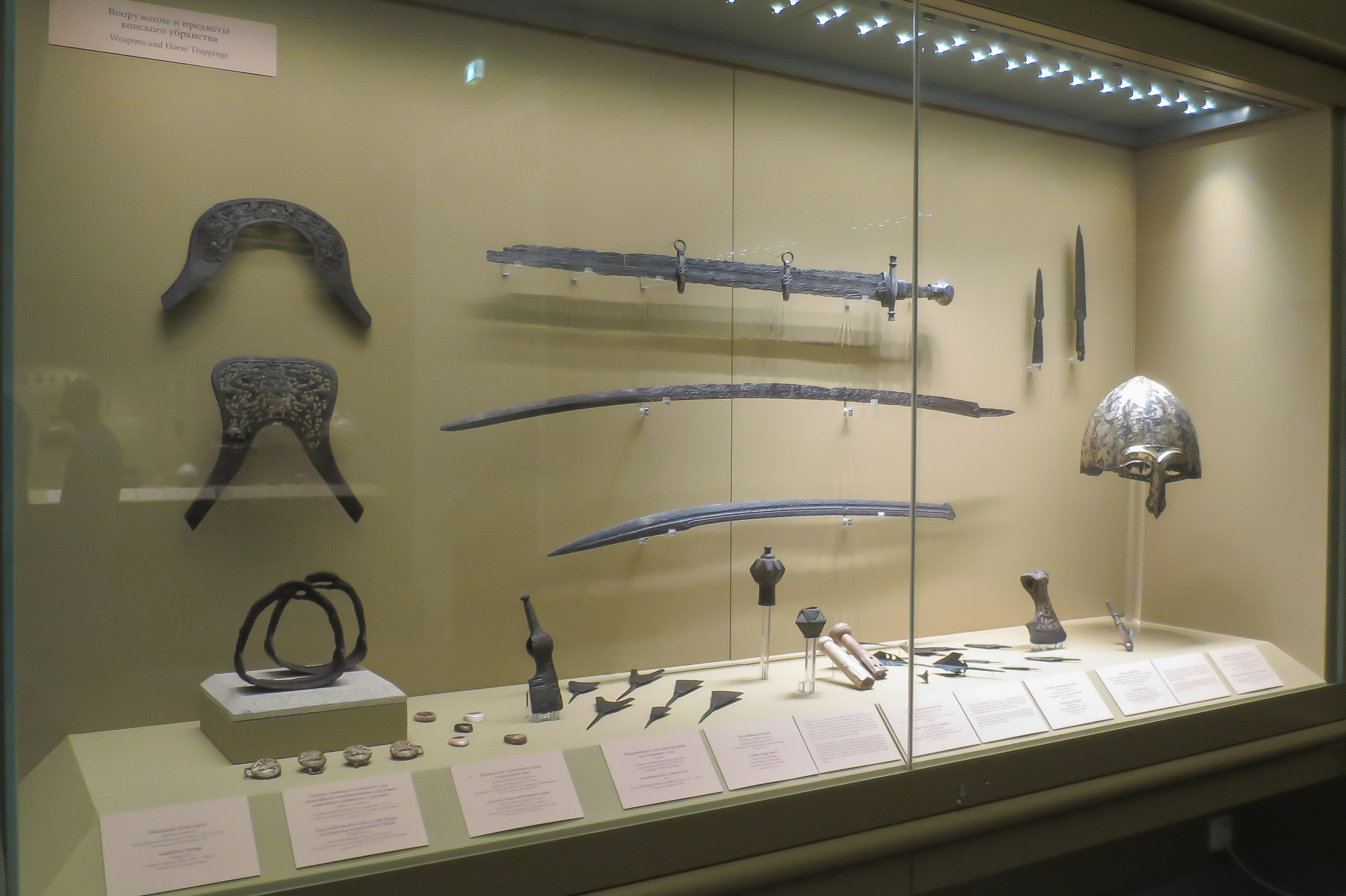
Three concurrent sword types from the Golden Horde: an arming sword, a long Turko-Mongol style sabre, and an early type of more compact kilij

Three 17th century swords with influence from the Turko-Mongol line: the North African Nimcha, the Indian Tulwar, and the Polish Szabla (Batorówka)

=== European swords ===
Eastern Europe had long had contact with nomadic steppe groups such as the Avars, Alans and Cumans. While Western Europe was still focused primarily on straight bladed longswords and arming swords during the medieval period to combat the heavy armour that was being used in European warfare, the arrival of Turkic warfare, first with the Mongols and secondly with the Ottomans, influenced warfare and armaments in Eastern Europe.

- The Byzantine Army employed a sword called the paramerion, which is considered to be a type of sabre, from the 11th century if not earlier. The Byzantines had close contact with various Turkic steppe peoples—Khazars, Pechenegs, Cumans etc.—from which the paramerion may have derived. Later Byzantine images, from the 14th century onward, show very curved swords with a yelman, which are similar to early examples of the Turkish kilij.
- Rus had an earlier history of straight swords from the earlier Viking age, but starting in the 10th century, the sabre was adopted as well. From the 10th through 13th centuries sabre use spread from southeastern Rus and made its way northward. Finds prior to the Mongol invasion show almost, but not quite, as many sabres as straight swords in use in Rus during these three centuries.
- In the Caucasus, the Circassians developed the Turko-Mongol sabre into a distinct version called the shashka by the 17th century.
- Poland too adopted this type of sword design in the szabla starting in the early 16th century. Indeed, these Hungarian and Polish examples of sword and cavalry would become so effective that the great powers of Europe would later take from this design in the development of the modern period cavalry sabre which exists in uniform dress of many armies to this very day.
- In Germany, encounters with the encroaching Turks caused modifications of the langes Messer which eventually brought about the dusack in the mid 16th century.

== See also ==
- Turco–Mongol tradition
