= Old Arbaki =

Predecessors of the Afghan Local Police

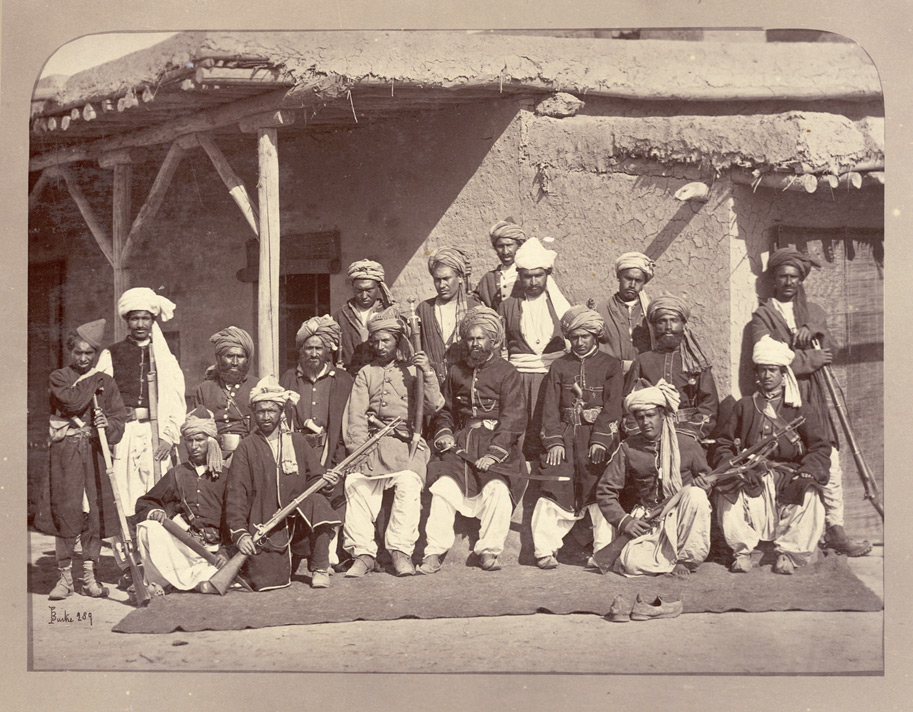
Members of the Arbaki in c. 1879, who are historically known as members of the Arbaki, which are the equivalent of county sheriffs in the United States.

The old Arbaki were the predecessor of the Afghan Local Police and were the Afghan equivalent of county sheriffs in the United States and to this day still exist. These groups are not considered militias, but rather, are composed of tribesmen from well-defined villages and tribes, tasked with maintaining law and order and defending their communities. Arbaki were often seen as a means to secure Afghanistan.

== Origins ==
The Arbaki has its origins in the Hotak and Durrani empires in the early 18th century, which had jurisdiction over parts of neighboring countries until the 1893 Durand Line was established between Mortimer Durand of British India and Abdur Rahman Khan of Afghanistan.

== Equipment ==
The Arbaki were often armed with Pulwar, Shamshir and later guns such as the Pattern 1853 Enfield, Colt Single Action Army Revolver and Jezail.
