= Scimitar =

Middle-Eastern sabre with a curved blade

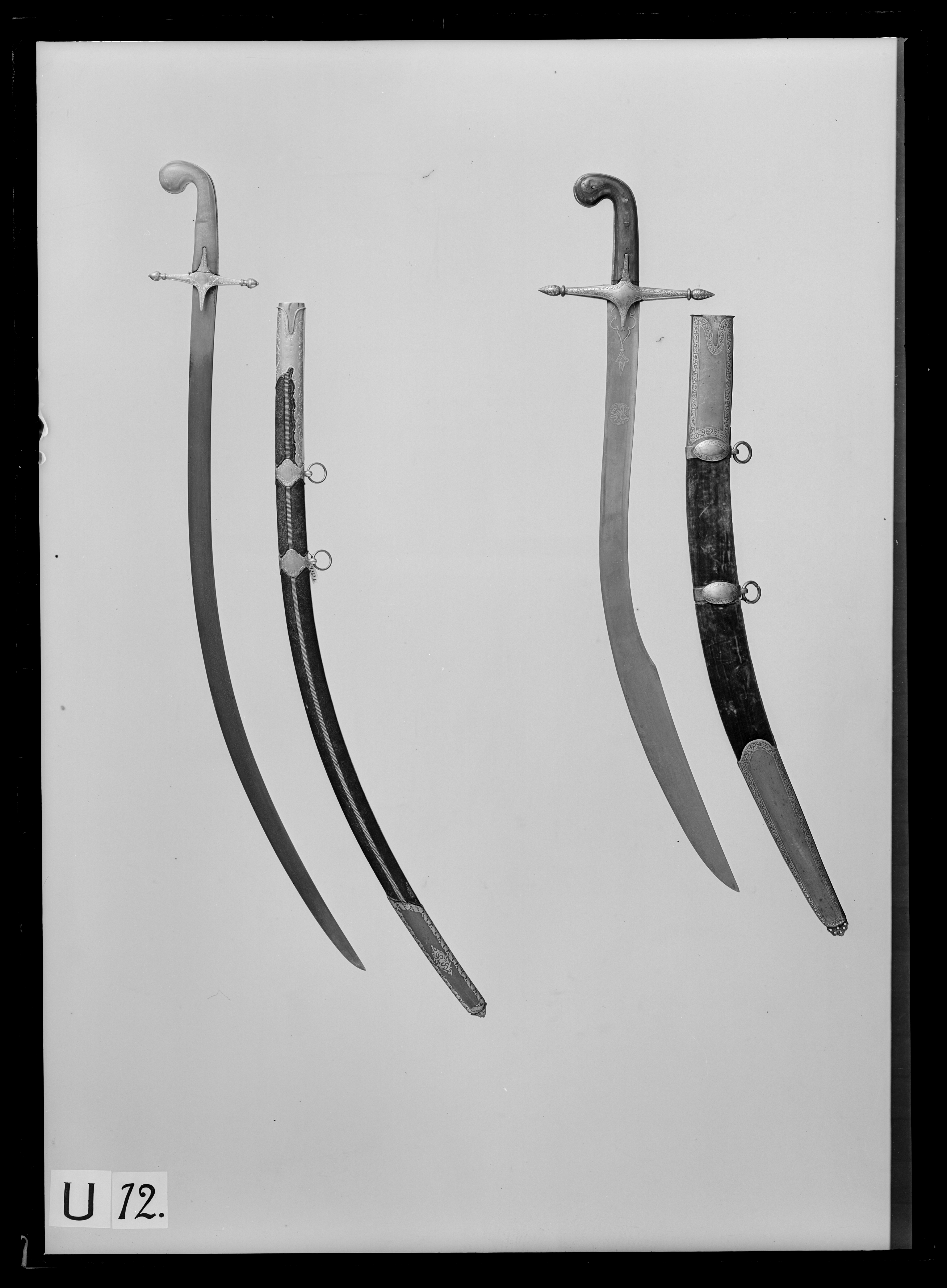
Two styles of scimitars: an Egyptian shamshir (left) and an Ottoman kilij (right)

A scimitar (Note: Also spelled simitar, scimetar, or scimiter.) (/ˈsɪmɪtər/ or /ˈsɪmɪtɑːr/) is a single-edged sword with a convex curved blade of about 75 to 90 cm (30 to 36 inches) associated with Middle Eastern, South Asian, and North African cultures. A European term, scimitar does not refer to one specific sword type but an assortment of different Eastern curved swords. These swords include the Persian shamshir, the Arab saif, the Indian talwar, the North African nimcha, the Turkish kilij, and the Afghan pulwar. All such swords are originally derived from earlier curved swords developed in Turkic Central Asia (Turkestan).

== Etymology ==
The English word scimitar, which first appeared in the 16th century, derives from French cimeterre (also scimeterre), itself derived from Italian scimitarra. The ultimate source is probably Persian shamshir, which literally means "lion's claw". The t in the European forms may be product of dissimilation. Scimitar came to be used to describe all curved blades, in contrast to the straight and double-edged European swords of the time. (Note: This is apparent in Thomas Page's The Use of the Broad Sword (1746): "The Sword was of enormous length and breadth, heavy and unweildy, design'd only for right down chopping by the Force of a strong Arm; till Time and Experience discovering the Disadvantages, by Degrees contracted its Length and lighten'd its Weight in to the more handy Form of the Scymitar; which was first invented by the Eastern Nations, and has continued to be their principal Weapon to this Day:...." "The Saracens, Turks and Persians, made use of but three different Throws with the Scymitar, and one of those, only on Horseback; the other two on Foot.")

== History of use ==
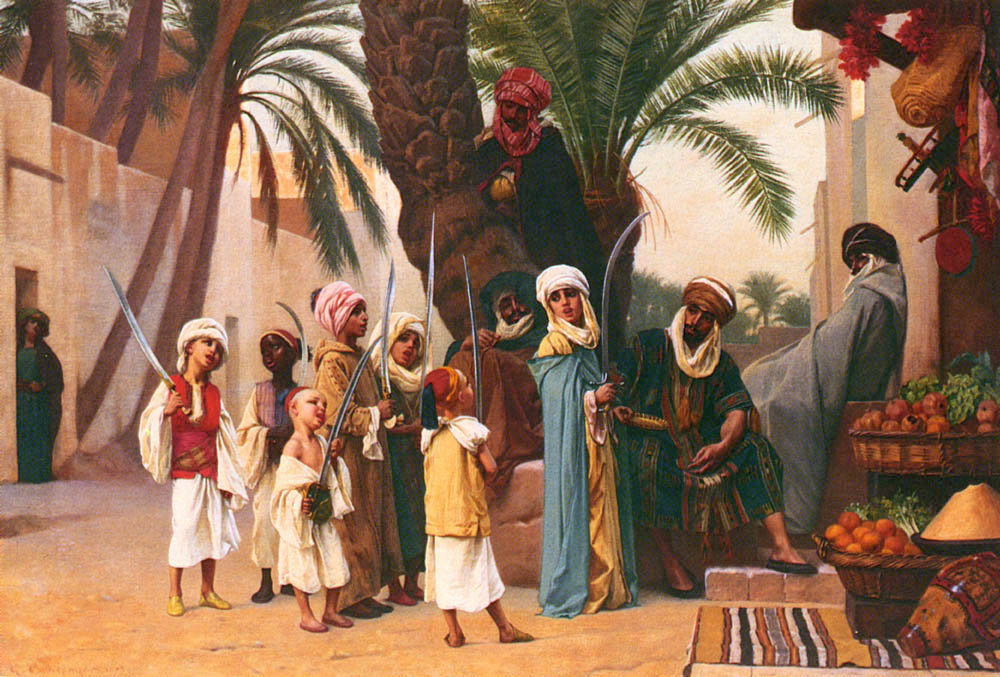
Arabs with scimitars from Boulanger's painting A Tale of 1001 Nights

The earliest evidence of scimitars is from the 9th century among soldiers in Khurasan. They were used in horse warfare because of their relatively light weight when compared to larger swords and their curved design, good for slashing opponents while riding on a horse. Nomadic horsemen learned from experience that a curved edge is better for cutting strikes because the arc of the blade matches that of the sweep of the rider's arm as they slash the target while galloping. Turks, Mongols, Rajputs and Sikhs used scimitars in warfare, among many other peoples. They were very important in Islam.

The scimitar was widespread throughout the Middle East from at least the Ottoman period until the age of smokeless powder firearms relegated swords to dress and ceremonial function. The Egyptian khopesh, brought to Egypt by the Hyksos, resembled scimitars. The khopesh is sometimes considered a scimitar. Early swords in Islamic lands were typically straight and double-edged, following the tradition of the weapons used by the Islamic prophet Muhammad. Though the famous double-edged sword, Zulfiqar wielded by Ali was of a curved design, the curved design was probably introduced into central Islamic lands by Turkic warriors from central Asia who were employed as royal body-guards in the 9th century and an Abbasid era blade has been discovered from Khurasan. These Turkic warriors sported an early type of sabre which had been used in central Asia since the 7th century, but failed to gain wider appeal initially in Islamic lands. There is a single surviving Seljuk saber from approximately the year 1200, which may indicate that under that empire curved blades saw some popularity. Following the Mongol invasions of the 13th century, the curved swords favored by the Turkic cavalry formed lasting impacts across much of the Middle East. The adoption of these swords was incremental, starting not long after Mongol conquest, and lasting well into the 15th century. During Islamization of the Turks, the kilij became more and more popular in the Islamic armies. When the Seljuk Empire invaded Persia and became the first Turkic Muslim political power in Western Asia, kilij became the dominant sword form. The Iranian shamshir was created during the Turkic Seljuk Empire period of Iran.

== Symbolism ==
The flag of Saudi Arabia shows the shahada above a scimitar (design used during 1938–1973; the modern design shows the scimitar in a more stylized form)

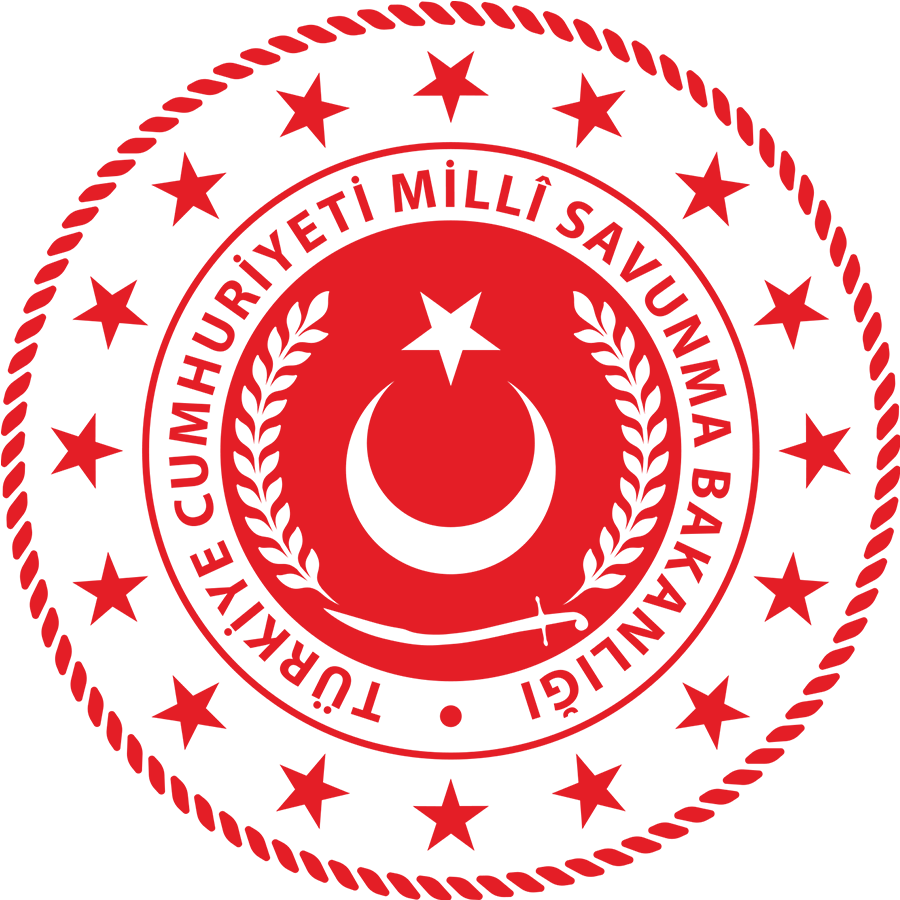
Seal of the Ministry of National Defense of Türkiye with a Turkish scimitar at the bottom

The sword (or saif) is an important symbol in Arab cultures, and is used as a metaphor in many phrases in the Arabic language. The word occurs also in various symbolic and status titles in Arabic (and adopted in other languages) used in Islamic states, notably:

- In the Yemenite independent imamate:
  - Saif al-Haqq, meaning "Sword of Truth".
  - Saif al-Islam "Sword of submission to Allah" or "Sword of Islam", was a subsidiary title borne (after their name and patronym) by male members of the al-Qasimi dynasty (whose primary title, before the name, was Amir), especially sons of the ruling Imam.
- Sayf al-Dawla and variations mean "Sword of the State".
- Saif Ullah Al-masloul the "drawn sword of God" was conferred by Muhammad, uniquely, to the recent convert and military commander Khalid ibn al-Walid.
- Saif ul-Mulk "sword of the realm" was an honorary title awarded by the Mughal Padshahs of Hind (India), e.g. as one of the personal titles (including Nawab bahadur, one rank above his dynasty's) conferred in 1658 by the Mughal emperor Aurangzeb to Nawab Muhammad Bayazid Khan Bahadur, a high mansabdar, whose jagir of Malerkotla was by sanad raised to Imperial riyasat, thus becoming an independent ruler.
- Saif ul-Ali, "Sword of Ali", referring to arguably most famous sword in Islamic history, belonging to both Muhammad, and later, Ali, Zulfikar, and with which Ali slew a Makkan foot soldier, cleaving both his helmet and head, at the Battle of Uhud, and with which he (Ali) slew Amr, a ferocious and devastating Makkan soldier at the Battle of the Trench at Madinah.

Saif and Saif al Din "Sword of the religion" are also common masculine (and male) Islamic names.

In Islamophobia: Making Muslims the Enemy, Peter Gottschalk and Gabriel Greenberg argue that the scimitar has been appropriated by Western culture and Hollywood to symbolize Arab Muslims in a negative light. Even though Muslims used straight-edge swords for the first two centuries of the Crusades, European Christians may have more closely tied the Christian cross-like shape of the swords to their cause. The authors commented that American cartoonists use the scimitar to symbolize "Muslim barbarity", despite the irony in scimitars being worn with some American military uniforms.

== In European art ==
In Shakespeare's works, the scimitar was a symbol for the East and the Islamic world.

Scimitars were used in 19th century orientalist depictions of Middle Eastern men. In the 20th century, they were often used to indicate that a character was Middle Eastern and occupying a villain role.

== In media ==
- Scimitars were used by Calormene warriors and royalty in The Chronicles of Narnia, such as The Horse and His Boy and The Last Battle.
- In the 1975 film Monty Python and the Holy Grail, a character says: "If I went 'round, sayin' I was an emperor, just because some moistened bint had lobbed a scimitar at me, they'd put me away!" This is in satirical reference to the legend of King Arthur and the Lady of the Lake.
- A scimitar was used by Morgan Freeman when playing Azeem Edin Bashir Al-Bakir, the Moorish ally to the title character of Robin Hood: Prince of Thieves.
- Scimitars were weapons used by Aladdin in the 1992 film.
- Scimitars are used extensively in the Assassin's Creed video game series, particularly in the first game, Assassin's Creed II, Assassin's Creed Brotherhood, Assassin's Creed: Revelations, Assassin's Creed III, Assassin's Creed III: Liberation, Assassin's Creed IV: Black Flag, Assassin's Creed Rogue, Assassin's Creed Unity and Assassin's Creed Mirage.
- Scimitars are a popular weapon in the RuneScape franchise.
- Curved swords are a staple weapon category in the Dark Souls and Elden Ring franchises. In each game the scimitar, which most closely resembles a shamshir, appears as the most basic curved sword.

== See also ==
- Cutlass
- Falchion
- Terciado
- Sabre
