= Mameluke sword =

Type of curved sword

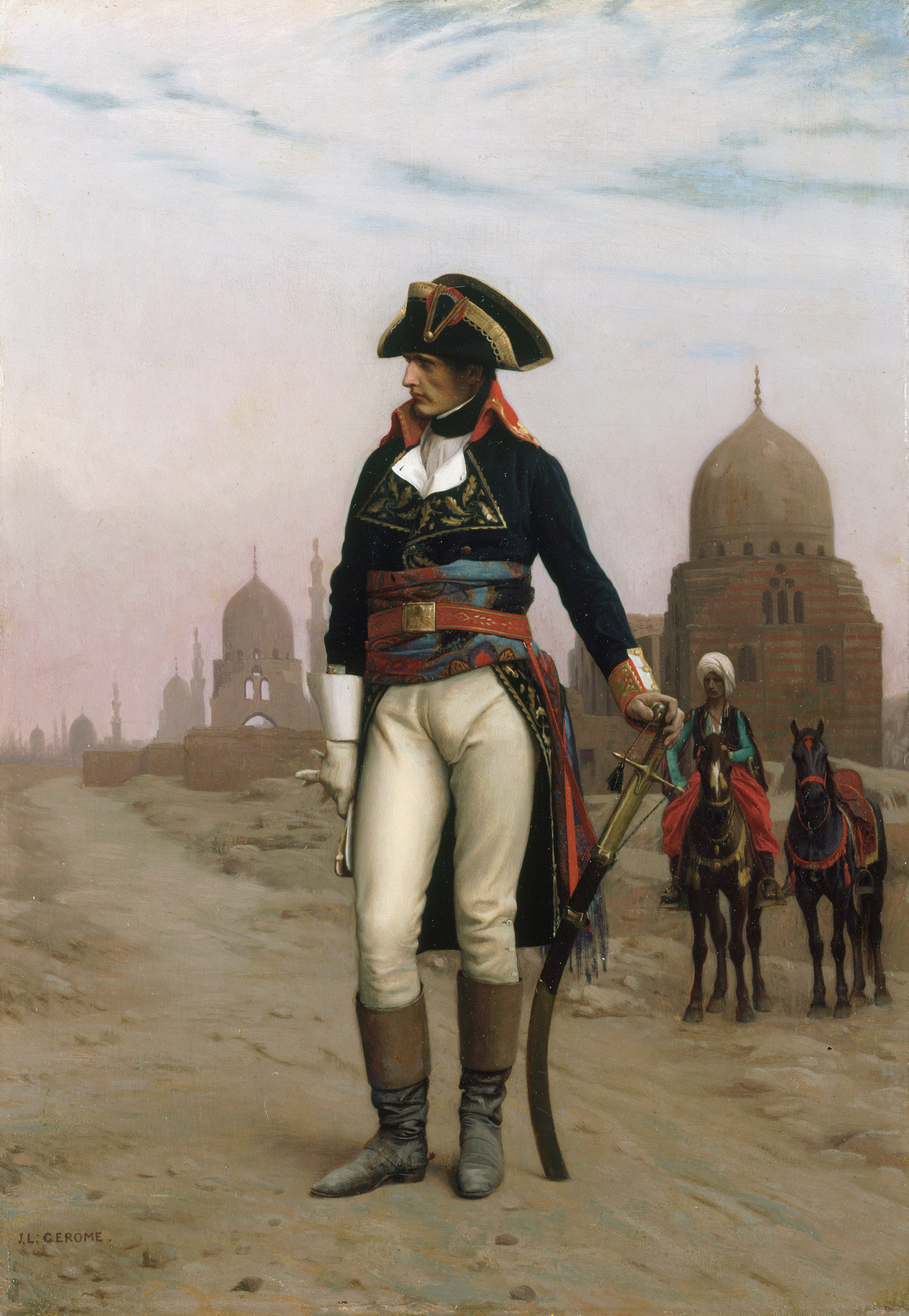
- Jean-Léon Gérôme, Napoleon in Egypt, c. 1863, with a Mameluke sword, Princeton University Art Museum
- Type: Sword
- Place of origin: Ottoman Egypt

Service history
- Used by: Mamluk warriors; French Army; United States Marine Corps; British Army; Royal Sardinian Army; Italian Royal Army; Australian Army

Specifications
- Blade type: Curved
- Hilt type: Cross

A Mameluke sword /ˈmæməluːk/ is a cross-hilted, curved, scimitar-like sword historically derived from sabres used by Mamluk warriors of Ottoman Egypt after whom the sword is named. Egypt was, at least nominally, part of the Ottoman Empire and the sword most commonly used in Egypt was the same as used elsewhere in the empire, the kilij.

The curved sabre was originally of Central Asian Turkic origin, from where the style migrated to the Middle East, Europe, India and North Africa. In Anatolia and the Balkans the sabre developed characteristics that eventually produced the Ottoman kilij. It was adopted in the 19th century by several Western militaries, including the French Army, British Army, Royal Sardinian Army, Royal Italian Army and the United States Marine Corps. Although some genuine Ottoman sabres were used by Westerners, most "mameluke sabres" were manufactured in Europe or America; their hilts were very similar in form to the Ottoman prototype, but their blades tended to be longer, narrower and less curved than those of the true kilij, while being wider and also less curved than the Persian shamshir.

In short, the hilt retained its original shape, but the blade tended to resemble the blade-form typical of contemporary Western military sabres. The Mameluke sword remains the ceremonial sidearm for some units to this day.

== United States Marine Corps ==
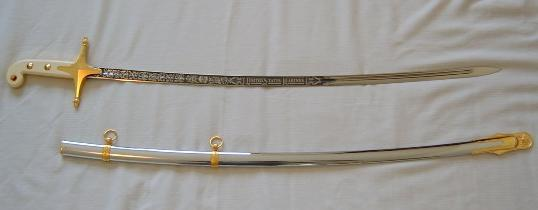
Today's U.S. Marine Corps officers' Mameluke sword closely resembles those first worn in 1826.

Marine Corps history states that a Mameluke sword was presented to Marine First Lieutenant Presley O'Bannon by the Ottoman Empire viceroy, Prince Hamet, on December 8, 1805, during the First Barbary War, in Libya, as a gesture of respect and praise for the Marines' actions at the Battle of Derna (1805). Upon O'Bannon's return to the United States, the state of Virginia presented him with a silver-hilted sword featuring an eaglehead hilt and a curved blade modeled after the original Mameluke sword given to him by Hamet. Its blade is inscribed with his name and a commemoration of the Battle of Tripoli Harbor.

Perhaps due to the Marines' distinguished record during this campaign, including the capture of the Tripolitan city of Derna after a long and dangerous desert march, Marine Corps Commandant Archibald Henderson adopted the Mameluke sword in 1825 for wear by Marine officers. After initial distribution in 1826, Mameluke swords have been worn except for the years 1859–1875 (when Marine officers were required to wear the U.S. Model 1850 Army foot officers' sword), and a brief period when swords were suspended during World War II. Since that time, Mameluke swords have been worn by Marine officers in a continuing tradition to the present day.

== British Army ==
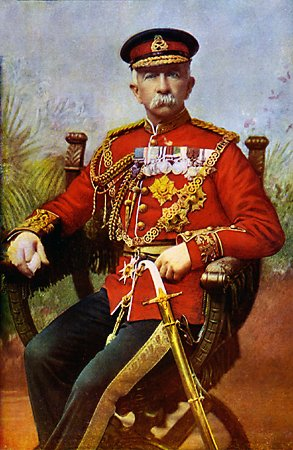
Field Marshal Sir Henry Evelyn Wood, circa 1900

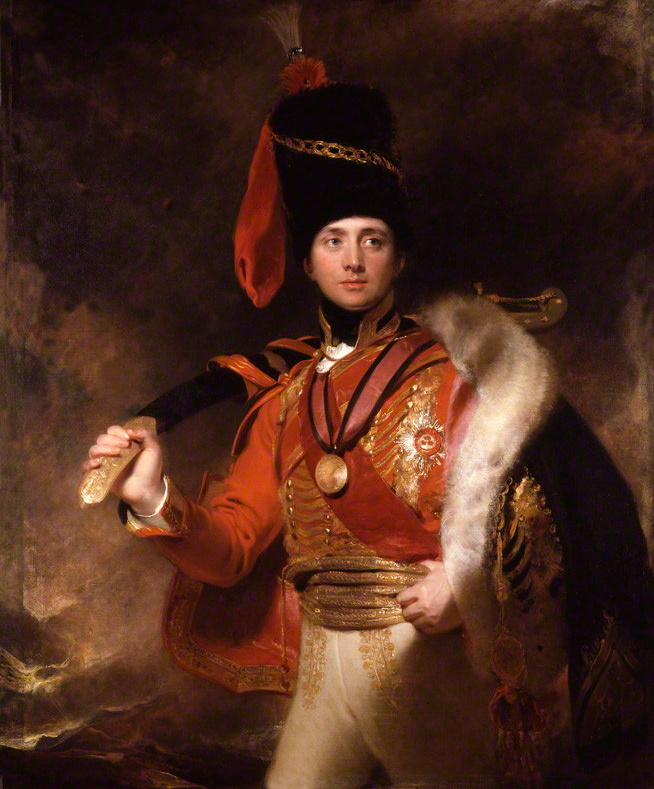
Charles Vane, 3rd Marquess of Londonderry, a British Hussar general, with a scabbarded kilij (related to Mameluke sword) of Turkish manufacture (1812)

Mameluke swords were adopted by officers of light cavalry regiments in the first decade of the 19th century, some were used as 'walking out swords' (for ornamental wear on social occasions on foot) but others were employed on active campaign. They are prominent in images of officers of the Hussars painted by Robert Dighton in 1807. As officially regulated dress or levée swords they first appear in 1822 for lancer regiments. Later, other light cavalry and some heavy cavalry regiments also adopted similar patterns. Though broadly similar in form, each regiment's swords had individual variations in the decoration of both blade and hilt. The current regulation sword for generals, the 1831 Pattern, is a Mameluke-style sword, as were various Army Band swords.

There are a number of factors which influenced the fashion for Mameluke swords in the British Army.

- Napoleon raised a number of Mameluke units during his Egyptian campaigns in the French Revolutionary Wars, leading to the adoption of this style of sword by many French officers. In the post-Napoleonic period French military fashion was widely adopted in Britain.
- The Duke of Wellington carried a Mameluke sword from his days serving in India and throughout his career. After he defeated Napoleon his status was a national hero, Commander-in-Chief of the Forces, and then prime minister; as such, his tastes had considerable weight.
- The United States Marine Corps sword, discussed above, has been suggested as also being influential. The 1831 Pattern General Officers' Sword is very similar to the USMC Mameluke that pre-dated it.

== Australian Army ==
The Mameluke is still used today by the Australian Army, carried by the rank of Major General or above on ceremonial occasions.

== See also ==
- U.S. Marine Corps swords
- Kilij – the original Turkish scimitar
