= Firangi (sword) =

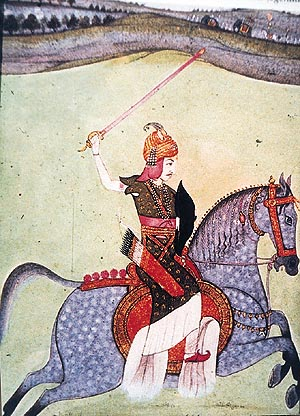
- Maratha Peshwa Bajirao, wielding a firangi sword.
- Type: Sword
- Place of origin: India

Service history
- Used by: The Mughals, Rajputs, Marathas, Sikhs and others

Production history
- Produced: c. 1500 to present

Specifications
- Blade length: 89 to 96 cm (35 to 38 in)
- Blade type: Double-edged or single-edged, straight bladed, pointed tip.

The firangi (/fəˈrɪŋɡiː/; derived from the Arabic term (al-Faranji) for a Western European [a "Frank"]) was an Indian sword type which used blades manufactured in Western Europe, particularly Solingen, and imported by the Portuguese, or made locally in imitation of European blades.

== Physical characteristics ==
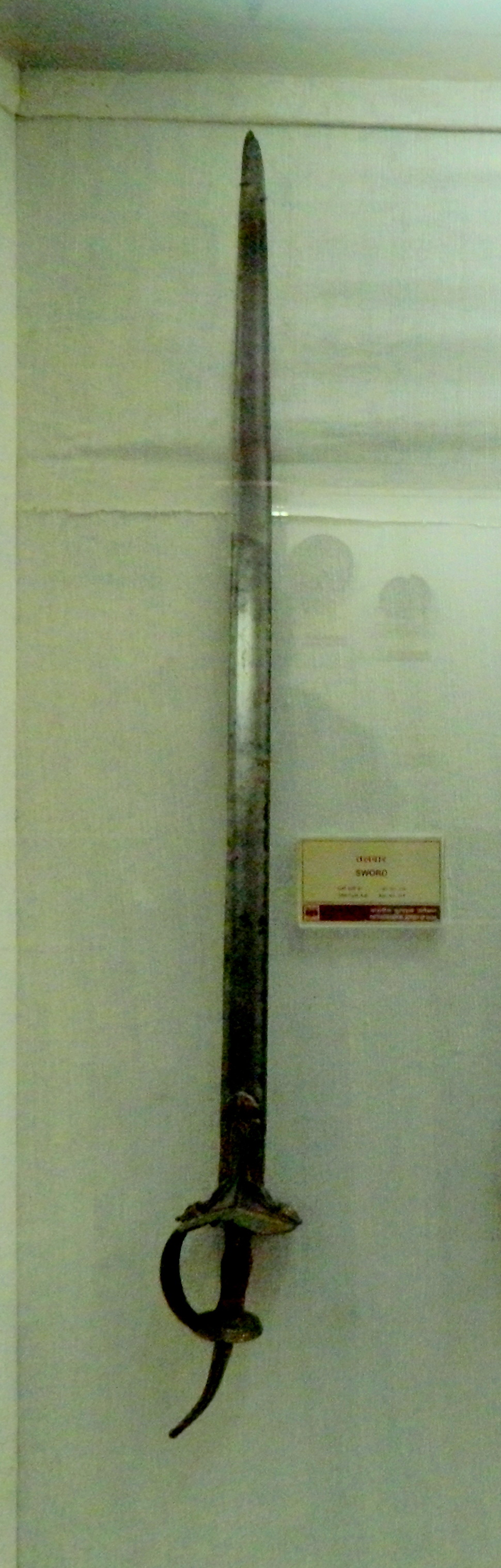
Typical firangi sword

The firangi sword characteristically had a long, 89 to 96 centimetres (35 to 38 in), straight blade of either broadsword (two edged) or, more commonly, backsword (single edged) form. The blade often incorporated one, two, or three fullers (grooves) and had a spear-tip shaped point. The sword could be used to both cut and thrust. Examples with narrow rapier blades have survived, though in small numbers. The hilt was of the type sometimes called the "Indian basket-hilt" and was identical to that of another Indian straight-bladed sword the khanda. The hilt afforded a substantial amount of protection for the hand and had a prominent spike projecting from the pommel which could be grasped, resulting in a two-handed capability for the sword. Like other contemporary Indian swords the hilt of the firangi was usually of iron and the tang of the blade was attached to the hilt using a very strong resin, additionally, the hilt to blade connection was reinforced by projections from the hilt onto either face of the forte of the blade which were riveted together through a hole passing through the blade. The finest examples of this type of sword can have extensive gold "koftigari" decoration to both hilt and blade.

== Use ==
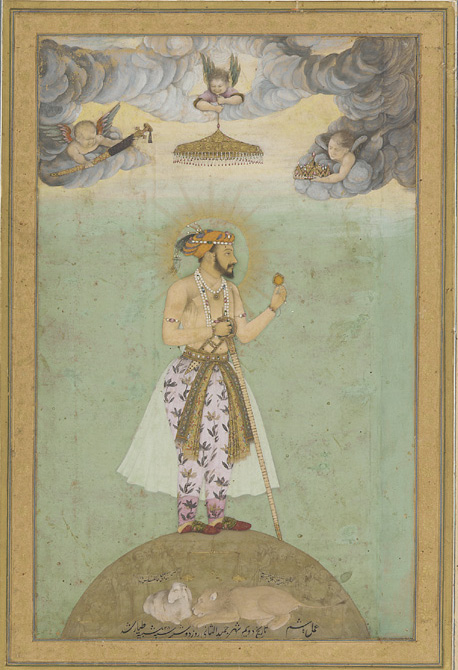
Mughal Emperor Shah Jahan standing, carrying a lily and a firangi sword as a symbol of martial power.

Because of its length the firangi is usually regarded as primarily a cavalry weapon. Illustrations suggest a 16th-century date for the development of the sword, though early examples appear to have had simpler cross-guard hilts, similar to those of the talwar. The sword has been especially associated with the Marathas, who were famed for their cavalry. However, the firangi was widely used by the Mughals and those peoples who came under their rule, including Sikhs and Rajputs. Images of Mughal potentates holding firangis, or accompanied by retainers carrying their masters' firangis, suggest that the sword became a symbol of martial virtue and power. Photographs of Indian officers of Hodson's Horse (an irregular cavalry unit raised by the British) show that the firangi was still in active use at the time of the Indian Mutiny in 1857–58.

== See also ==
- Khanda (sword)
- Backsword
- Talwar
- Pulwar
