= Shamshir =

Type of Persian/Iranian curved sword

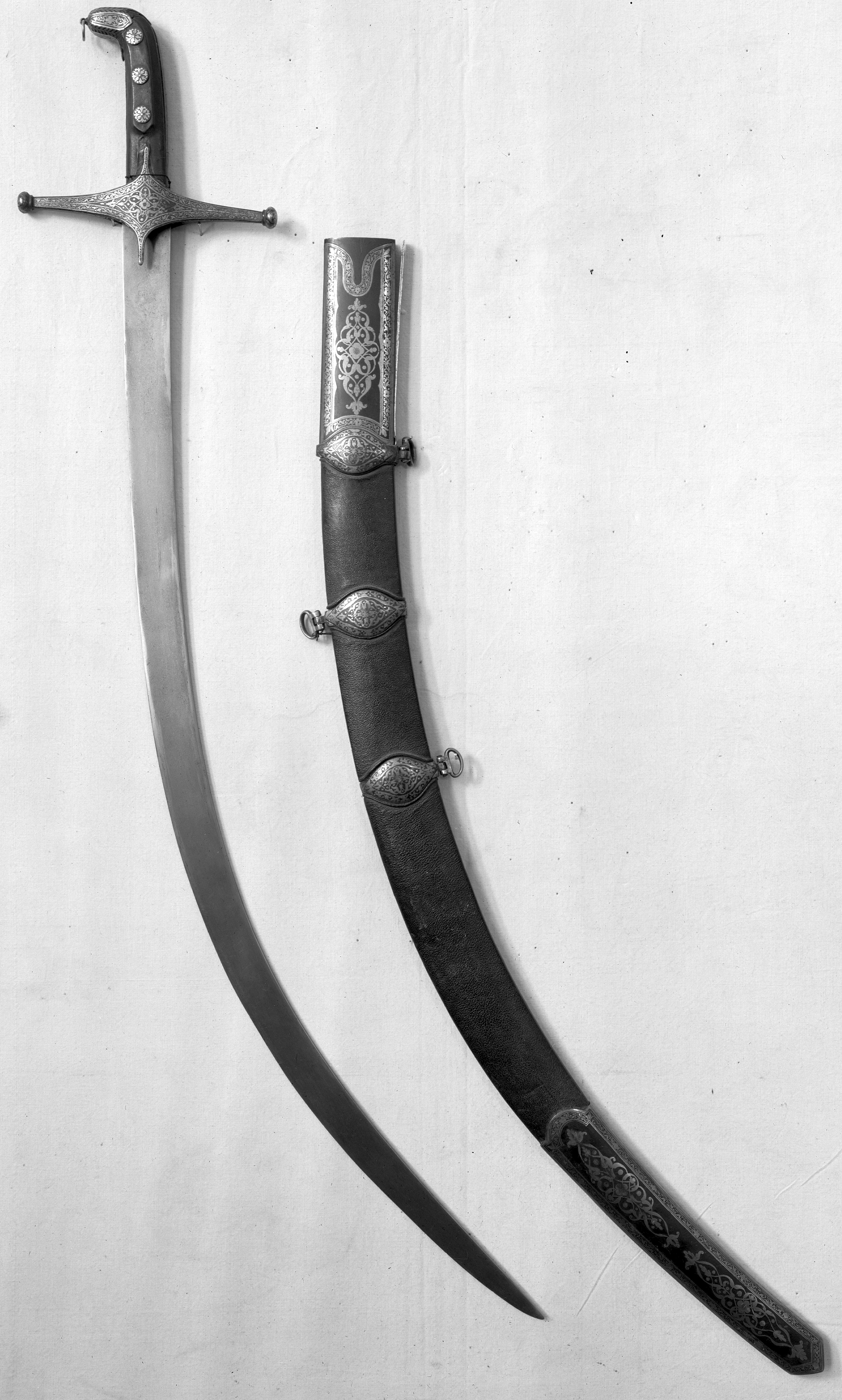
Syrian shamshir from the Royal Armoury, Stockholm

A shamshir (Persian: شمشیر) is a type of Iranian sword with a radical curve. The name is derived from the Persian word shamshīr, which is made of two words sham ("fang") and shir ("lion"). The curved "scimitar" sword family includes the shamshir, kilij, talwar, pulwar, and nimcha.

A shamshir shekargar (Persian: شمشیر شکارگر, romanized: shamshir-e shekârgar, lit. 'hunters' sword or hunting sword') is a shamshir with decorative engraving on the blade, usually depicting hunting scenes.

== Etymology ==
Although the name has been associated by popular etymology with the city of Shamshir (which in turn means "curved like the lion's claw" in Persian) the word has been used for a sword since ancient times, as attested by Middle Persian shamshir (Pahlavi šmšyl), and the Ancient Greek σαμψήρα / sampsēra (glossed as "foreign sword").

"Shamshir" is usually taken to be the origin of the word scimitar, the latter being a broader term.

== Description ==
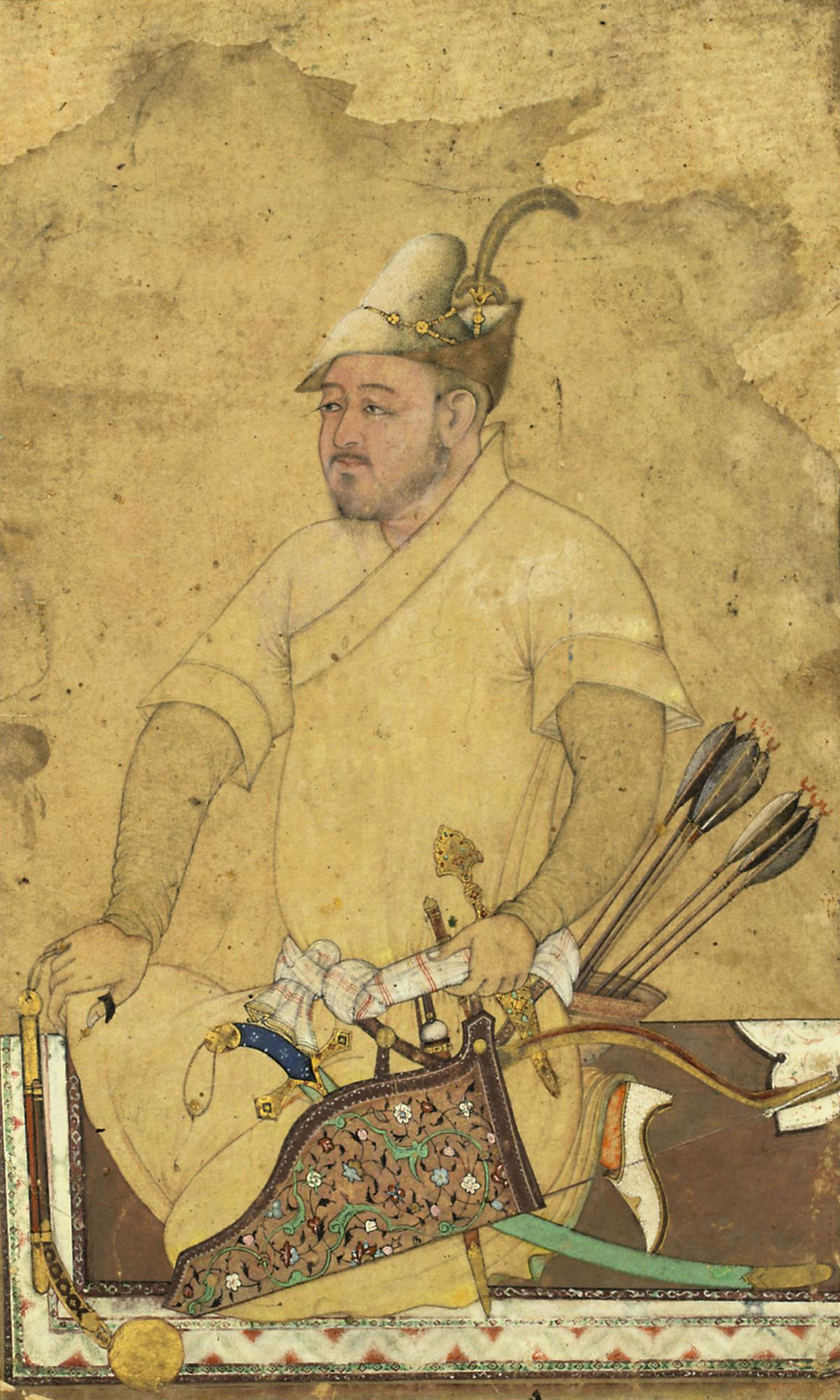
Uzbek warrior armed with bow and arrows, khanjar, flail, and a shamshir

Early Persian swords were straight and double edged. Curved sabre blades are Central Asian in origin. There is considerable disagreement between historians as to when these curved blades were introduced from Central Asia into Persia, and over what period the design was adopted by Persian makers who modified it into the recognizable shamshir. Curved swords did exist in Persia in the 9th century, used by soldiers in the Khorasan region of Central Asia, but they were not widely adopted. The sword now called a "shamshir" was developed in Persia over a period of time following influence from the Turkic Seljuk Khanate in the 12th century, the Mongol invasion of the 13th century, and had taken a form distinct from earlier sabres by the 16th century. The shamshir had "relatives" in Turkey (the kilij), the Mughal Empire (the talwar), and the adjoining Arabian world (the saif). Over the years blades produced in India or the Ottoman empire might have been rehilted in Persia, or vice versa, leading to different regional characteristics in one sword.

The shamshir is a curved sword, featuring a slim blade that has almost no taper until the very tip. Instead of being worn upright (hilt-high), it is worn horizontally, with the hilt and tip pointing up. It was normally used for slashing unarmored opponents either on foot or mounted; while the tip could be used for thrusting, the drastic curvature of the blade made accuracy more difficult. It has an offset pommel, and its two lengthy quillons form a simple crossguard. The tang of the blade is covered by slabs of bone, ivory, wood, or other material fastened by pins or rivets to form the grip. Many of the older Persian shamshir blades are made from high-quality crucible wootz steel and are noted for the fine "watering" on the blades.

== See also ==
- Acinaces – Type of Scythian short sword
- Arab sword – Weapon from The Arabian Peninsula
- Mameluke sword – Type of curved sword
- Pulwar – Single-handed curved sword
