= Kilij Arslan =

Kilij Arslan, meaning Sword Lion in Turkish, was the name of five sultans of the Seljuk Sultanate of Rûm:

- Kilij Arslan I reigned as of 1092, died 1107
- Kilij Arslan II reigned as of 1156, died 1192
- Kilij Arslan III reigned as of 1204, died 1205
- Kilij Arslan IV reigned as of 1248, died 1265
- Kilij Arslan V reigned as of 1310, died 1318 (disputed)
