= Talwar =

Type of sword from the Indian subcontinent

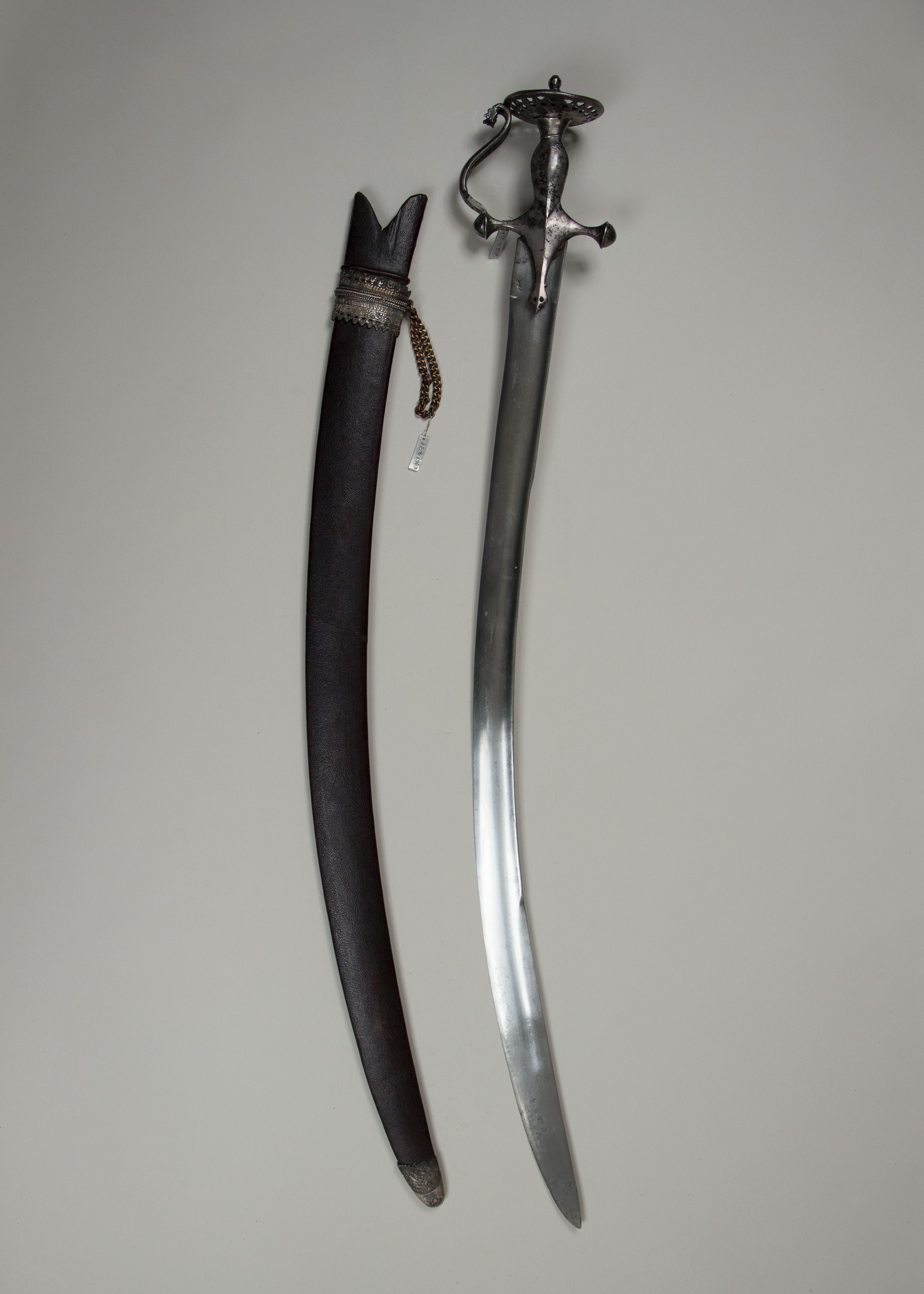
- Typical 18th-century talwar, with iron disc hilt and knucklebow, and a fullered blade.
- Type: Sword
- Place of origin: Indian subcontinent

Production history
- Produced: Early types from c. 1300, the classic form from c. 1500 to present (mostly within the Mughal Empire)

Specifications
- Blade type: Single-edged, curved bladed, pointed tip.
- Hilt type: Unique Indian "disc hilt"
- Scabbard/sheath: Leather- or cloth-covered wood and same with metal mounts, all metal- and leather-covered metal

The talwar (pronounced [t̪əlʋaːr]), also spelled talwaar and tulwar, is a type of curved sword or sabre from the Indian subcontinent.

== Etymology and classification ==
The word talwar originated from the Sanskrit word taravāri (Sanskrit: तरवारि) which means "one-edged sword". It is the word for sword in several related languages, such as Hindustani (Hindi and Urdu), Nepali, Marathi, Gujarati, Punjabi, etc. and as toloar (talōẏāra) in Bengali.

Like many swords from around the world with an etymology derived from a term meaning simply 'sword', the talwar has in scholarship, and in museum and collector usage, acquired a more specific meaning. However, South Asian swords, while showing a rich diversity of forms, suffer from relatively poor dating (so developmental history is obscure) and a lack of precise nomenclature and classification. The typical talwar is a type of sabre, characterised by a curved blade (without the radical curve of some Persian swords), possessing an all-metal hilt with integral quillons and a disc-shaped pommel. This type of hilt is sometimes called the 'Indo-Muslim hilt', or 'standard Indian hilt'. Talwars possessing only slightly curved blades can be called sirohi. However, many other variations exist. Swords with straight blades and the disc-pommel hilt are usually referred to as 'straight-bladed talwars' (though the word dhup is also used), while those with the same hilt but yatagan-type forward-curved blades are termed 'sosun patta'. Swords with sabre-blades and all metal Indo-Muslim hilts, but having the pommel in the shape of the head of an animal or bird, instead of the disc, are termed talwar, without being differentiated by name.

== History ==
The talwar belongs to the same family of curved swords as the Persian shamshir, the Turkish kilij, Arabian saif and the Afghan pulwar, all such swords being originally derived from earlier curved swords developed in Turkic Central Asia. The talwar typically does not have as radical a curve as the shamshir and only a very small minority have the expanded, stepped yelman (a sharp back edge on the distal third of the blade) typical of the kilij.

The talwar has a distinctive, all-metal hilt, developed in Medieval India. The increasing influence in India of Turco-Afghan, and later Turco-Mongol, dynasties (employing Persian and Central Asian arms) in the Late Medieval and subsequent eras led to ever greater use of sabre-like, curved swords. By Mughal times, the talwar had become the most popular form of sword in medieval India. The talwar was the product of the marriage of the curved blade derived from Turco-Mongol and Persian swords and the native all-metal Indo-Muslim hilt.

== Characteristics ==
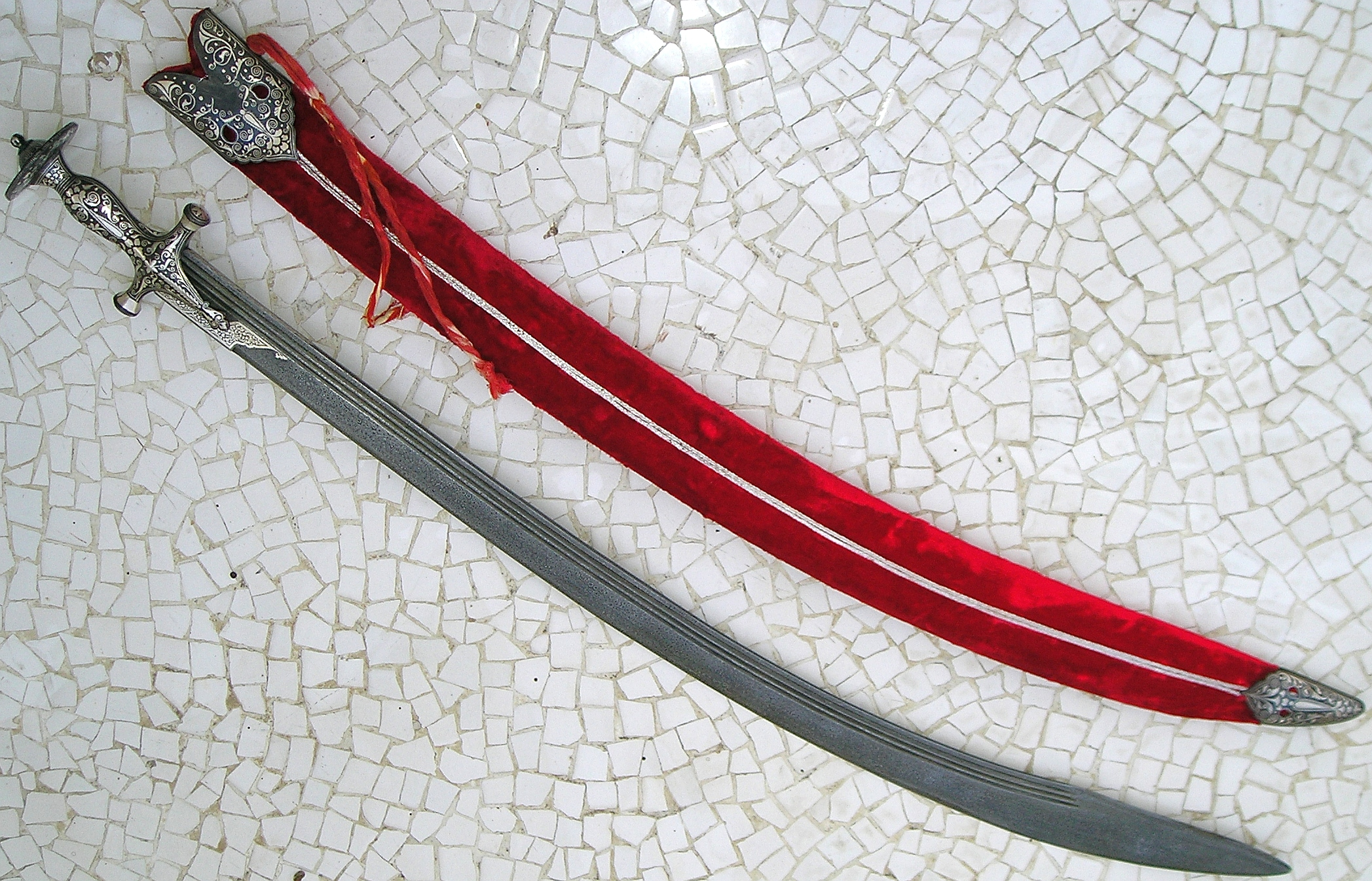
Talwar with a wootz blade and silver koftgari decoration to hilt and blade forte. Note the widening of the blade near the tip.

The talwar was produced in many varieties, with different types of blades. Some blades are very unusual, from those with double-pointed tips (zulfiqar) to those with massive blades (sometimes called tegha – often deemed to be executioner's swords but on little evidence). However, all such blades are curved, and the vast majority of talwars have blades more typical of a generalised sabre. As noted above, swords with blades other than curved sabre-blades, or possessing hilts radically different from the Indo-Muslim type are usually differentiated by name, though usage is not entirely consistent.

Many examples of the talwar exhibit an increased curvature in the distal half of the blade, compared to the curvature nearer the hilt. Also relatively common is a widening of the blade near the tip (often without the distinct step [latchet] to the back of the blade, characteristic of the yelman of the kilij). The blade profile of the British Pattern 1796 light cavalry sabre is similar to some examples of the talwar, and it has been suggested that the talwar may have contributed to the design of the British sabre.

A typical talwar has a wider blade than the shamshir. Late examples often had European-made blades, set into distinctive Indian-made hilts. The hilt of the typical talwar, is of the Indo-Muslim type, and is often termed a "disc hilt" from the prominent disc-shaped flange surrounding the pommel. The pommel often has a short spike projecting from its centre, sometimes pierced for a cord to secure the sword to the wrist. The hilt incorporates a simple cross-guard which frequently has a slender knucklebow attached. The hilt is usually entirely of iron, though brass and silver hilts are found, and is connected to the tang of the blade by a very powerful adhesive resin. This resin, or lac, is derived from the peepal tree, it is softened by heating and, when cooled, it sets solidly. More ornate examples of the talwar often show silver or gold plated decoration in a form called koftgari. Talwars of princely status can have hilts of gold, profusely set with precious stones, one such, preserved at the Baroda Palace Armoury, is decorated with 275 diamonds and an emerald.

== Use ==
The talwar was used by both cavalry and infantry. The grip of the talwar is cramped and the prominent disc of the pommel presses into the wrist if attempts are made to use it to cut like a conventional sabre. These features of the talwar hilt result in the hand having a very secure and rather inflexible hold on the weapon, enforcing the use of variations on the very effective "draw cut". The fact that the talwar does not have the kind of radical curve of the shamshir indicates that it could be used for thrusting as well as cutting purposes. The blades of some examples of the talwar widen towards the tip. This increases the momentum of the distal portion of the blade when used to cut; when a blow was struck by a skilled warrior, limbs could be amputated and persons decapitated. Because of this attribute, the talwar was also used for executions in some regions. The spike attached to the pommel could be used for striking the opponent in extreme close quarter circumstances when it was not always possible to use the blade. Due to the presence of a blunted ricasso the talwar can be held with the fore-finger wrapped around the lower quillon of the cross guard.

== Gallery ==
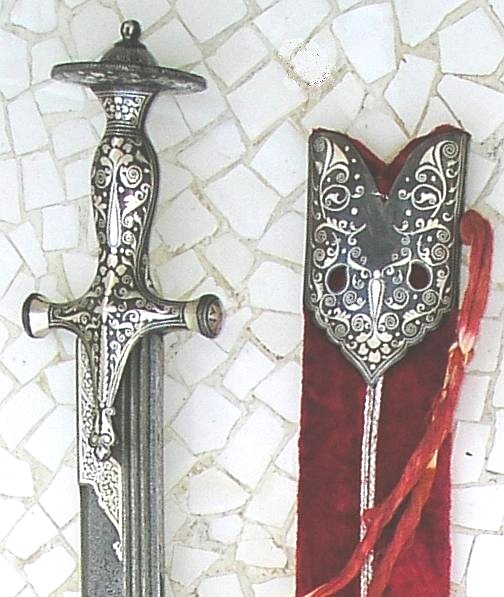
Talwar hilt without knuckle bow, with extensive silver koftgari decoration

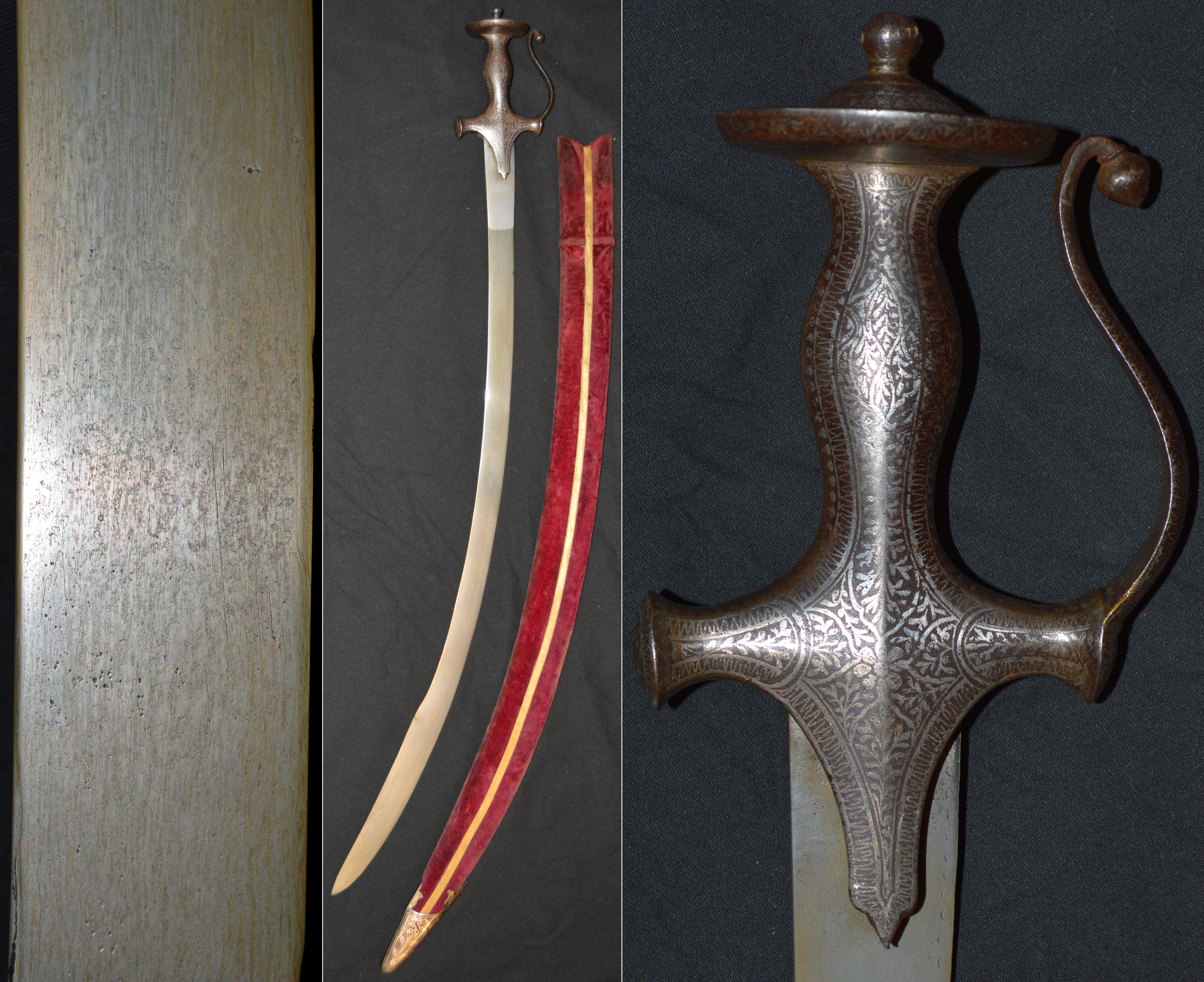
Talwar hilt with knuckle bow, 19th century, silver koftgari decoration, damascus steel blade.

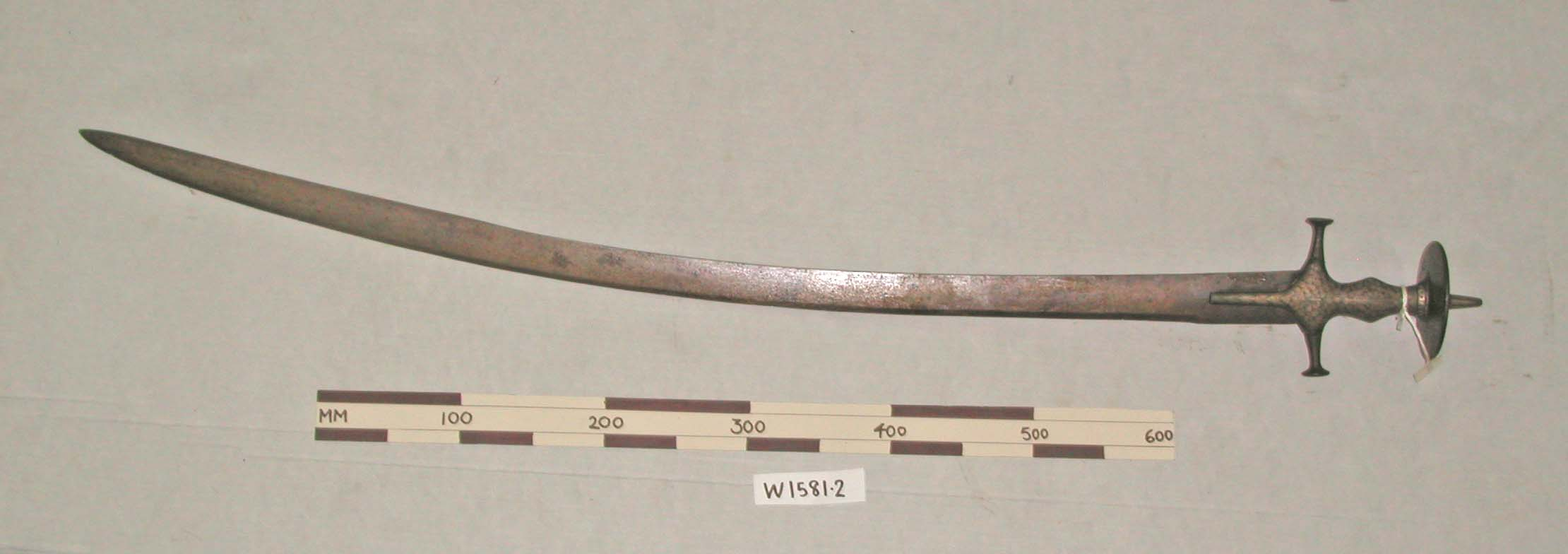
Typical talwar with plain sabre-blade

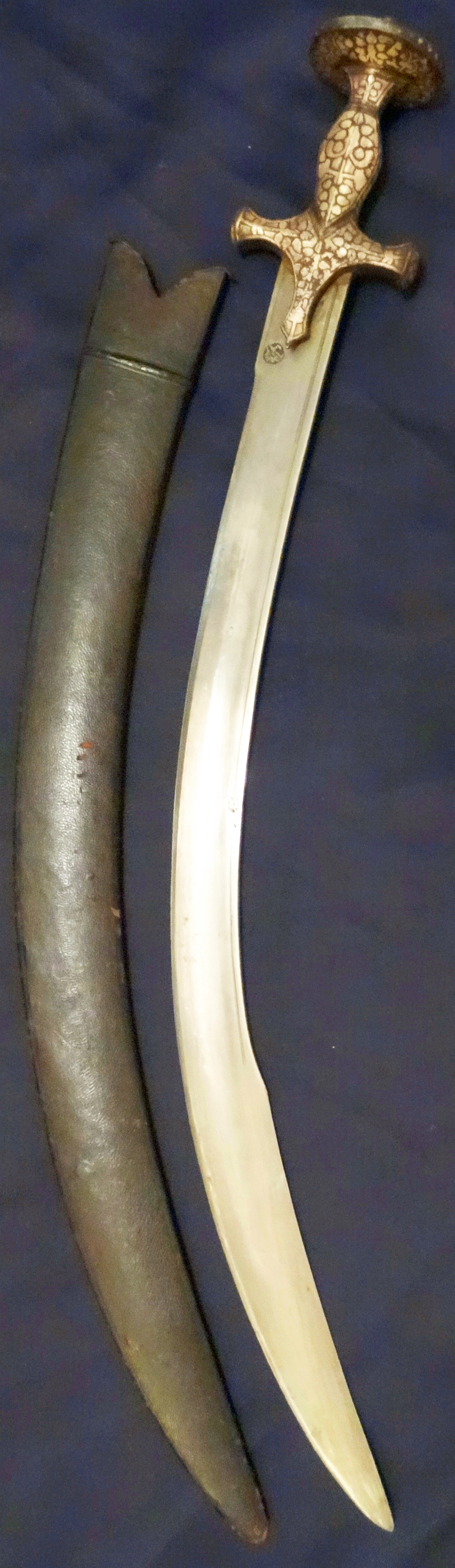
Talwar, 19th century, 23 inch long blade, typical style steel handle finely decorated with silver koftgari inlay work.

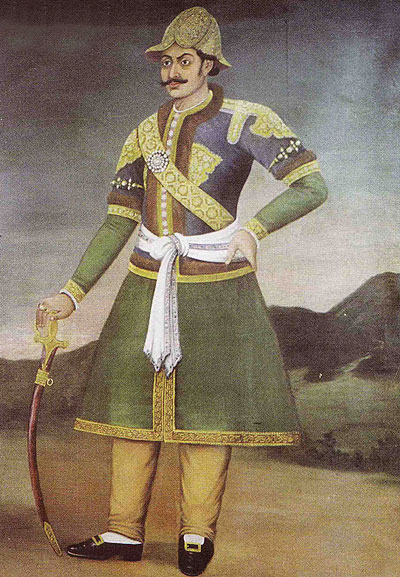
Bhimsen Thapa, Mukhtiyar of Nepal (1806–1837), holding a talwar

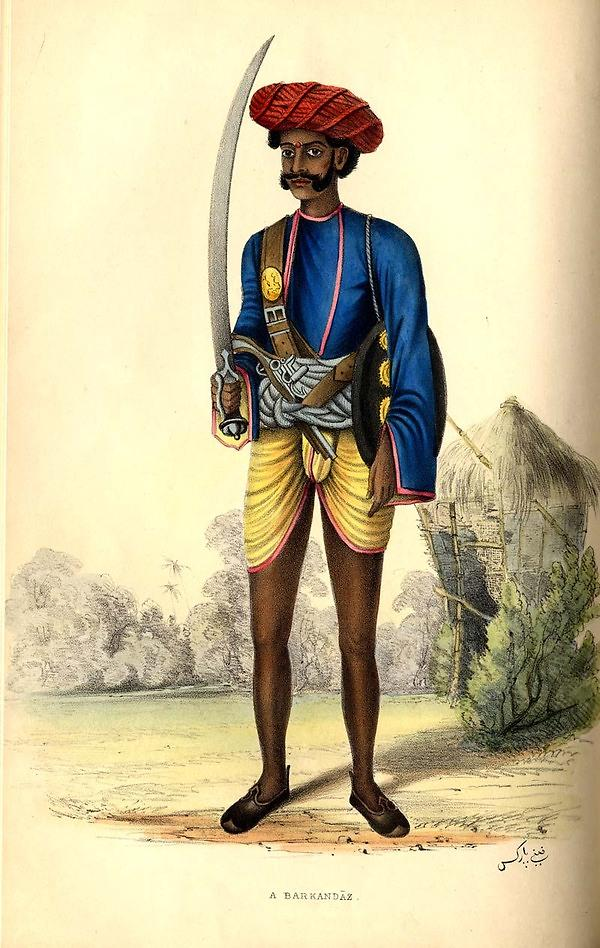
Indian soldier holding a talwar, 1850

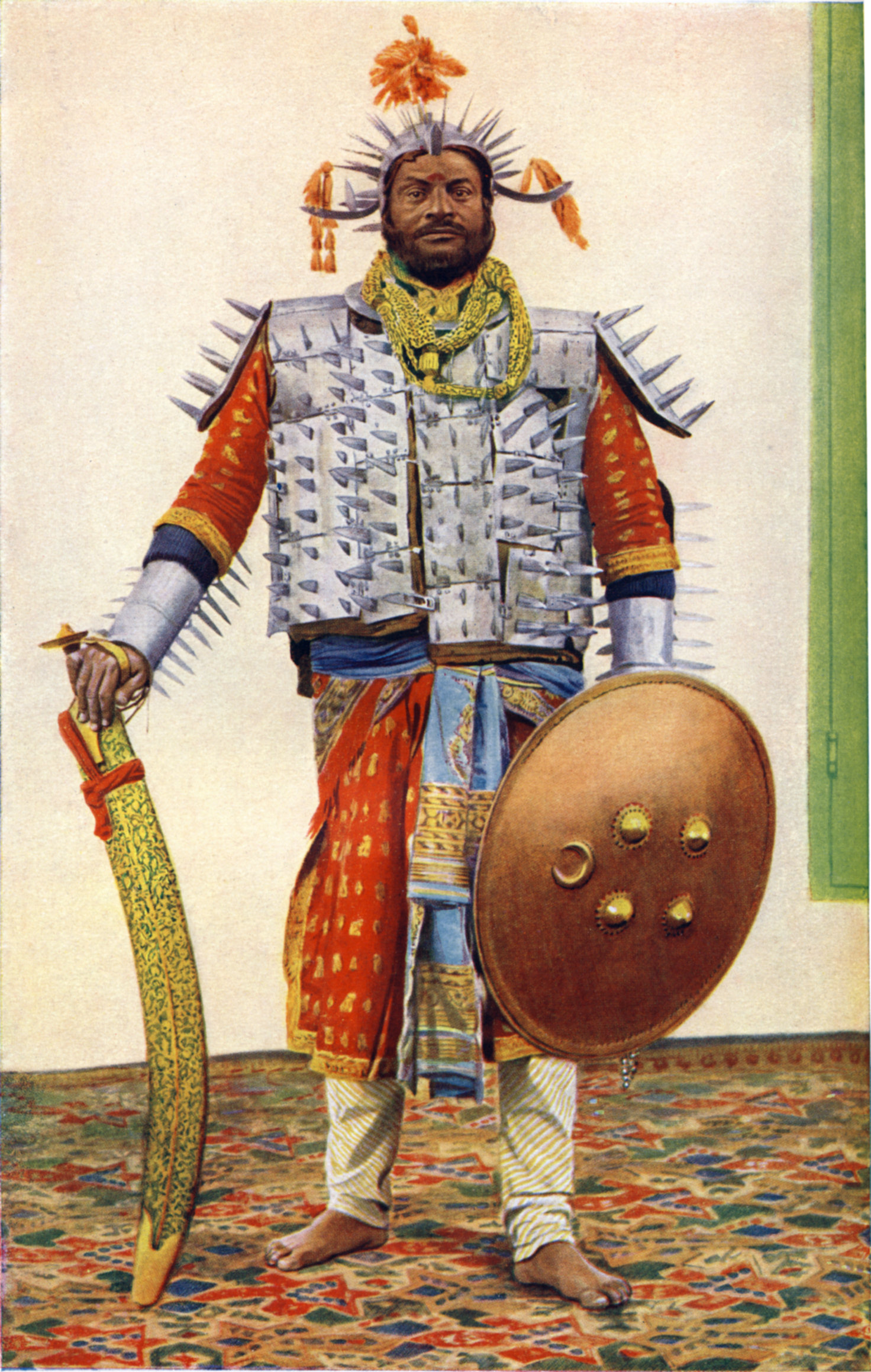
Photograph (hand-coloured), original dated 1898, of the high executioner of the former princely state of Rewah, central India, with large Tegha sword.

== See also ==
- Firangi
- Khanda
- Kukri
- Ram-dao
- Mughal weapons
