= Nimcha =

Type of sabre from North Africa

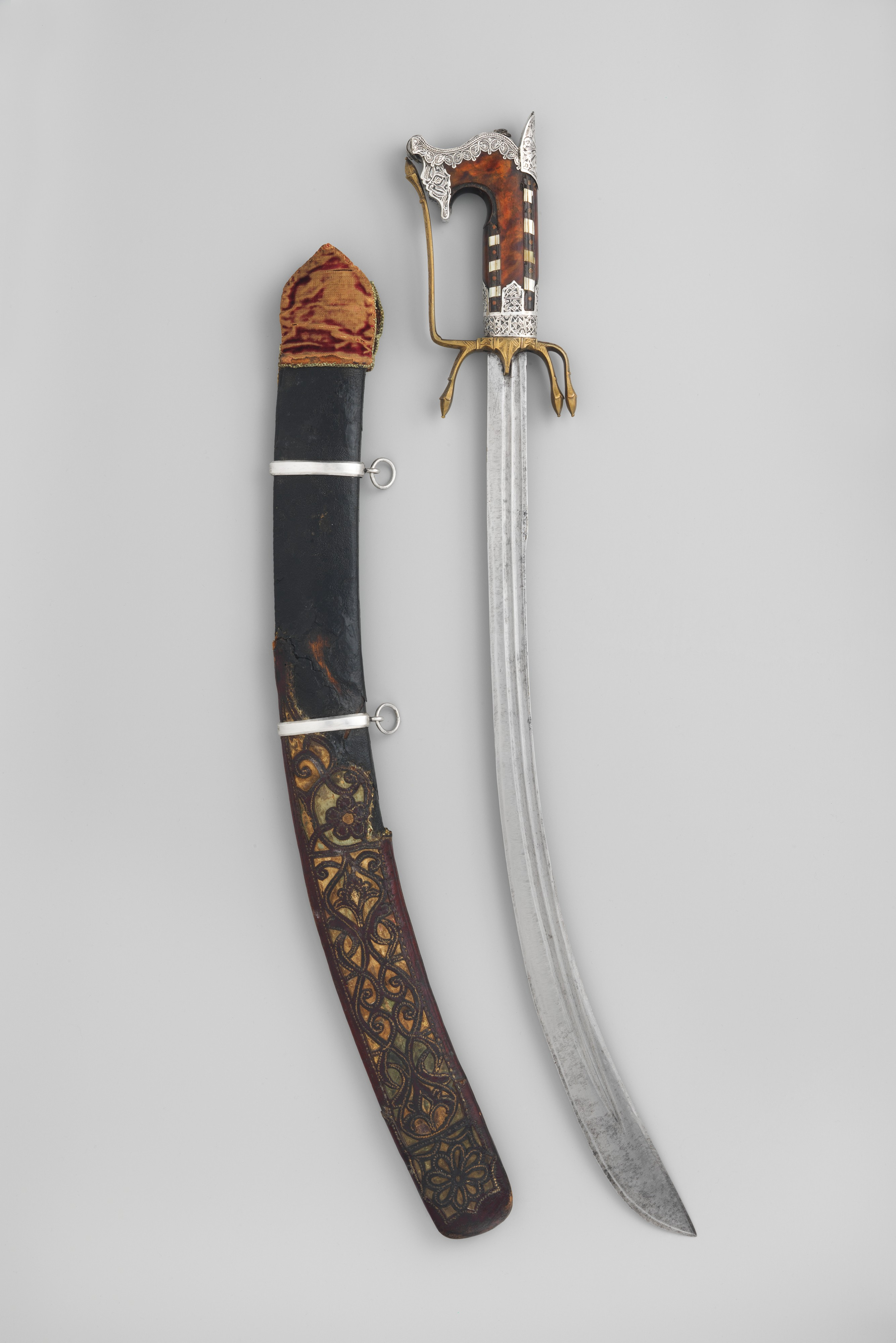
- One of the oldest nimcha on display, with a blade from the 16th century, at the Metropolitan Museum of Art, originating from Algeria.
- Type: Sword

Service history
- In service: 16th to 19th century
- Used by: 15th to 16th century: Marinid Sultanate; Kingdom of Tlemcen; Hafsid Kingdom; 16th to 19th century: Kingdom of Morocco; Deylik of Algiers; Beylik of Tunis

A nimcha (Arabic: نمشة) is a single-handed sword from North Africa, especially used in Morocco, Algeria, and Tunisia. It is classified as a type of scimitar or saif. Becoming popular in north Africa during the 16th century, surviving nimcha are usually from the late 18th century onward and are notable for often using older blades. Stylistically they often bore Arabian type handles with tugrah inscribed on the blade.

== Characteristics ==
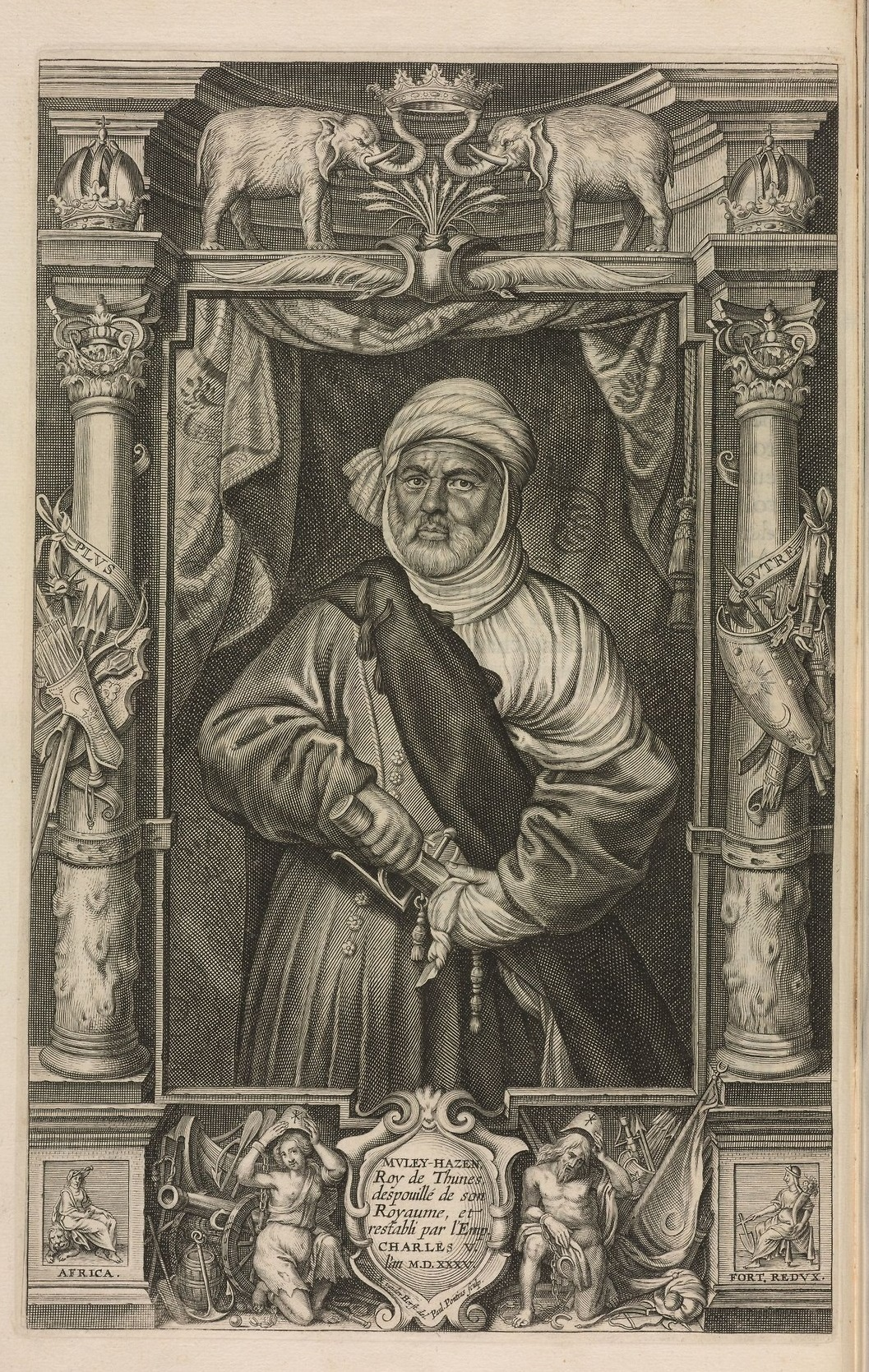
Depiction of a Hafsid sultan of Tunis holding a nimcha

Blades on nimcha came in a variety of forms, and were often imported from Europe. Always of a single edge variety the two main forms were either a short generally more deeply curved 'cutlass style', or a longer more slender form that sometimes bore a clipped point.

Nimcha also have distinct hilts that sport forward pointing quillions, which end in a 'bud' style. The wooden handles are flat sided and squared off at an almost 90 degree "hooked" pommel. The blade and hilt are attached by a stud located on the top of the pommel. The cross guard will often have a knuckle guard which starts beneath the quillions and runs to the bottom of the pommel in a distinct 'squared off' fashion; on the opposite side of the hilt this path is normally continued into a 3rd quillion.

== Use ==
Nimcha were popular both on the land and among sailors. As a result of seafarers this style of sword was popularized in far off southern Arabia, Yemen, and Zanzibar. Each of these areas had nimchas which varied slightly in design, for example Zanzibari swords have more sharply bent handles, a finger guard shaped like a "D", and a turtle shaped cap on the pommel securing the blade and hilt.

In Arabia nimchas were regularly used as a gift.

Barbary corsairs also preferred this sword, and army units such as the Black Guard and the Odjak of Algiers also equipped their troops with nimchas.
