= Arab sword =

Weapon from The Arabian Peninsula

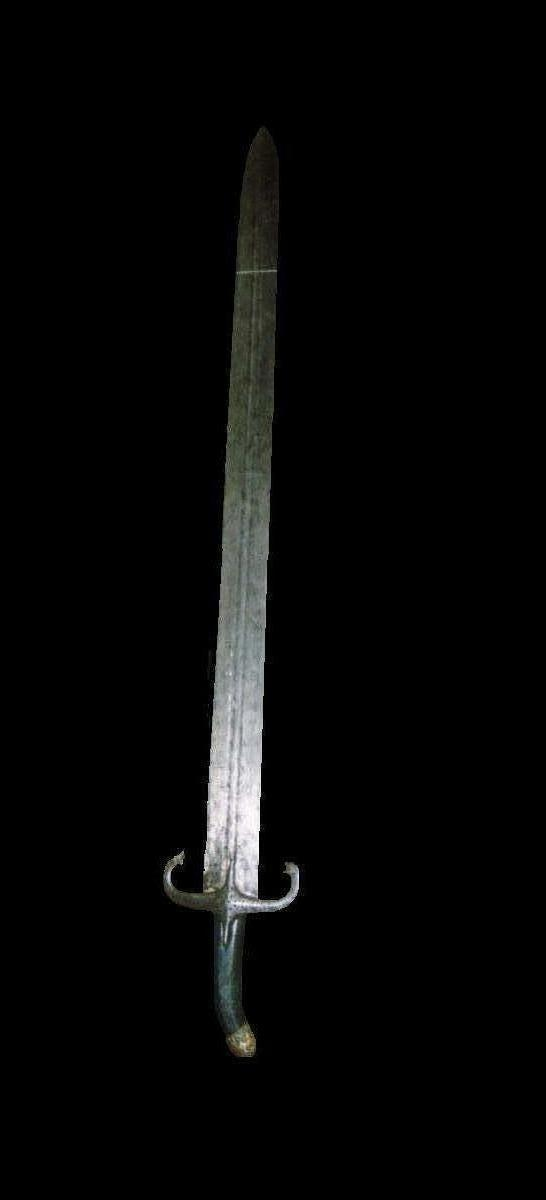
Sword of Caliph Umar, found in Topkapi Museum, Istanbul, Turkey

The saif (Arabic: سيف), sometimes called a shamshir (from Persian: شمشیر), depending on the era, originated in Arabia before the 7th century. Little is known about this weapon besides what al-Kindi wrote in his treatise On Swords in the 9th century.

== Description ==
In the article Introduction to the Study of Islamic Arms and Armour, A. Rahman Zaky says the saif is "[a]n Arab sword, [with] a rather broad blade and sometimes with a peculiarly hooked pommel. The size varies greatly. It is found in most countries where Arabs have lived, and each has its own variety. Early Arab chroniclers used to mention two kinds of swords: Saif Anith, which was made of iron, and Saif Fulath or Mu akka, which was made of steel."

== Etymology ==
Saif is an Arabic word for sword.

== Anatomy ==
The handle is the miqbad; the pommel, halq; and the quillon, haris. The blade is composed of the false edge and the true edge, which are known as the zafiya or hafat zafiya and the haqiqia, respectively. The sword's point is called the nuqtat. Some Arab swords may have a fuller, called an akmal, but others do not. Therefore, the area where the fuller would be is completely flat.

One particular Islamic innovation is the act of gilding their swords. Many archaeologically discovered Arab swords tend to be decorated in this fashion with verses from the Quran or Hadith, or with a particular emphasis on a virtue that means something to the wielder. The gilding is typically made with gold, silver, or bronze, or a mix thereof.

== History ==
The production of the Arab sword has four distinct periods: Pre-Islamic (ancient swords before the 7th century), Early Islamic (old swords 7th to 8th centuries), Islamic Golden Age (swords of the 9th to early-13th centuries) and the Abandonment (late swords of the late-13th to 16th centuries). Most information on Arab swords comes from literature.

=== Pre-Islamic ===
Before the rise of Islam in the 630s, the settled communities in the Arabian Peninsula developed into distinctive civilizations, and their history is limited to archaeological evidence. Islamic scholars later recorded accounts written outside of Arabia and Arab oral traditions. Among the most prominent civilizations were the Dilmun, which arose around the end of the fourth millennium BC and lasted to about 600 AD, and the Thamud, which arose around 3000 BC and lasted to about 300 AD. Additionally, from the beginning of the first millennium BC, Southern Arabia was the home to some kingdoms such as the Sabaeans, and the coastal areas of Eastern Arabia were controlled by the Iranian Parthians and Sassanians from 300BC. The Arabs of the peninsula, thus, had their own local system of warfare, which was not of big armies, but of small battles and skirmishes among tribes.

=== Early Islamic ===
Swords in Mu'tah, called Mashrafiya swords, were so highly regarded that the Prophet Muhammad ordered in 629 a raid on the city to capture them. In the case of other captured weapons, we can be less sure about where they were produced. This is true of the weapons taken from the Jewish tribe known as the Banu Qaynuqa. In his sira, the Prophet's biographer Ibn Ishaq, recounts that during the Prophet Muhammad's lifetime, this tribe was noted as arms manufacturers, or as possessing large stocks of arms in Medina; it is possible that some of their arms were produced there.

=== Islamic Golden Age ===
By the years of the Islamic golden age, the sabers and double-edged swords of the Middle East co-existed.

=== Abandonment ===
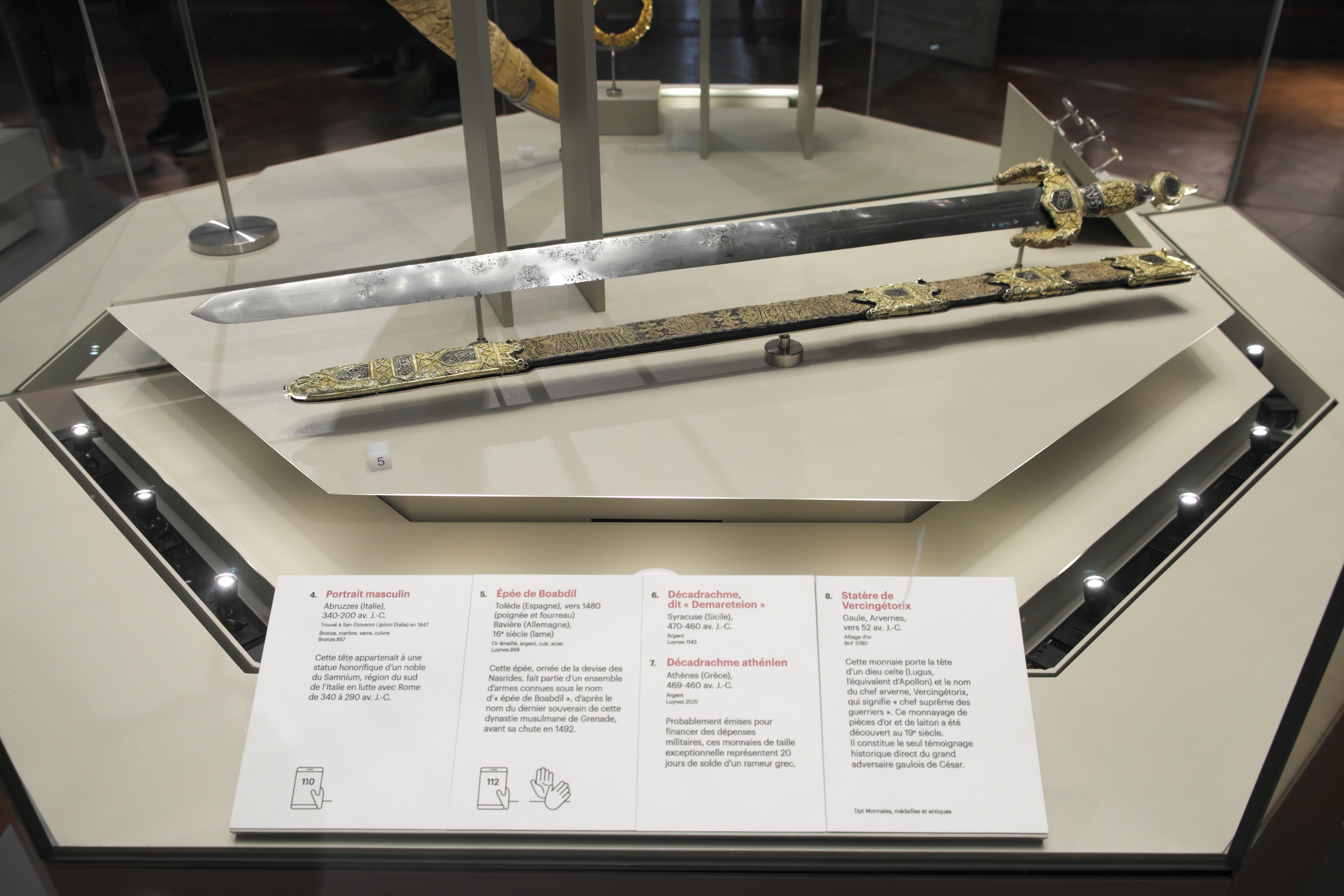
Sword of Boabdil — hispano-moorish sword of the XV-XVI c.

In the later years of the Arab sword, of the seven places listed by Al-Kindi as sites of manufacture, four remained by the latter half of the 13th century. With Khorasan and Damascus razed by the Mongols and Byzantium conquered by the Crusaders in the Fourth Crusade, the Arab sword took a strong decline. Its end came in the 16th century, when the Ottomans seized Egypt in 1517 and Yemen in 1552–60 with the scimitar, the shamshir, and the kilij, thus marking the end of the Arab sword. Neither the Mongols, Crusaders, nor Ottomans had shown an interest in the Arab sword. These groups had their own traditions, and thus displaced them. The last two places, Sri Lanka and Kedah, had slowly grown influenced by neighboring traditions and thus ceased to make it altogether.

In c. 1350, Ibn Qayyim al-Jawziyya wrote a treatise on Arab arms called al-Furusiyya. In this text, he proclaims that aside from horsemanship, lance, and archery, swordsmanship was a fourth discipline of Furusiyya.

== Manufacturing ==
Al-Kindi lists seven places from which Arab swords were forged. Starting with the best: Yemen, Khorasan, Damascus, Egypt, Rum (meaning Byzantium), Sri Lanka, and Qalah (possibly Kedah).

== Use ==
During the early Islamic years, the Arabs sheathed their weapons in baldrics. The use of sword and baldric was consciously abandoned by the Abbasid caliph al-Mutawakkil (847–861) in favor of the saber and belt. But the use of the sword and the baldric seems to have retained a ceremonial and religious significance. For example, the Zangid ruler Nur ad-Din (1146–74) was anxious to demonstrate that he was a pious traditionalist, searching out the old methods preferred by the Prophet Muhammad. Consequently, among his reforms, he re-adopted the custom of wearing a sword suspended from a baldric. His successor Salah ad-Din (1138–1193), known in the West as Saladin, did the same, and it is noteworthy that he was buried with his sword, "he took it with him to Paradise".

According to David Nicolle, the Arab sword was used mainly for cutting. He cites Usama ibn Munqidh's memoir as evidence that when Usama was being attacked by a Hashshashin, Usama struck the assassin down. Other stories by Usama add credence to David Nicolle's theory.

During the Mamluk period, the saber seems to have been the preferred weapon of the warrior elite. Still, the most finely decorated edged weapons were swords. Swords were used in the most important ceremonial events in the Mamluk period, that is, in the investiture of Mamluk sultans and caliphs of the restored Abbasid dynasty, where the ruler was "girded" with the "Bedouin sword" saif badawi. There are no surviving descriptions of such swords, but it can be suggested as a hypothesis that the exquisitely decorated Mamluk sword blades now preserved in Istanbul are in fact saif badawi.

A white illustration of the Arab sword is currently on the Saudi Arabian flag, below the also white Shahadah.

== Bibliography ==
- Alexander, David (2001). "Swords and Sabers during the Early Islamic Period". Gladius. XXI.
- Cobb, Paul M. (2008). The Book of Contemplation: Islam and the Crusades (Penguin Classics). Penguin Classics. ISBN 0140455132.
- Hitti, Phillip K. (2000). An Arab-Syrian Gentleman and Warrior in the Period of the Crusades. Columbia University Press. ISBN 0231121253.
- Hoyland, Robert G. (2006). Medieval Islamic Swords and Swordmaking. Gibb Memorial Trust. ISBN 0906094526.
- Nicolle, David (1994). Saracen Faris AD 1050-1250. Oxford: Osprey Publishing. ISBN 978-1-85532-453-4.
- Scanlon, George T. (1961). A Muslim Manual of War. Cairo: American University in Cairo Press. ISBN 978-1-61797-111-2.
- Zaky, A. Rahman (1965). A Preliminary Bibliography of Medieval Arabic Military Literature. Gladius IV. http://gladius.revistas.csic.es/index.php/gladius/article/viewFile/191/193
- Zaky, A. Rahman (1961). Introduction to the Study of Islamic Swords and Armour. Gladius I. http://gladius.revistas.csic.es/index.php/gladius/article/viewFile/211/213
