= Huta Ludwików =

Polish metal parts manufacturer

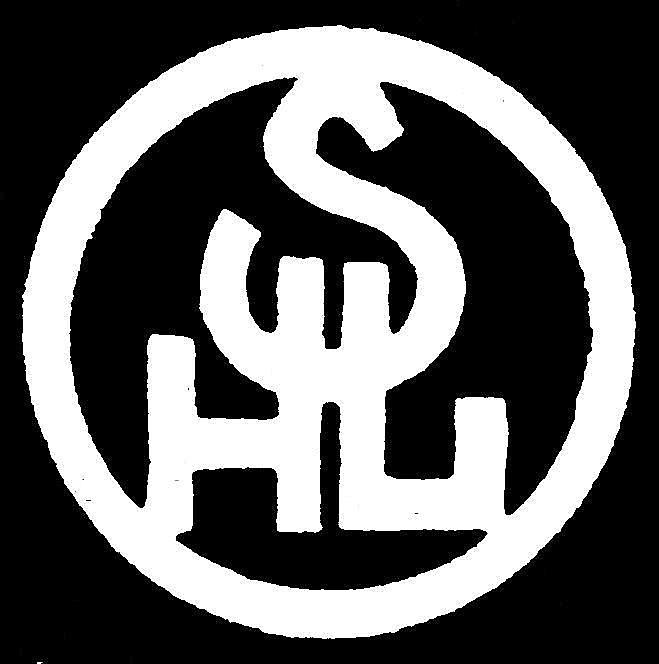
- The SHL factory logo, 1939
- Built: 1919
- Location: Kielce
- Owner: Zakłady Wyrobów Metalowych

Huta Ludwików (literally Ludwików Steelworks, often abbreviated SHL) is one of the oldest and best-known Polish metal parts manufacturers. The company is a subsidiary Of Kielce-based Zakłady Wyrobów Metalowych joint-stock company. Huta Ludwików is a major producer of automotive parts, supplying most European automakers. In the past the name of the factory was primarily associated with various types of military equipment produced for the Polish Army, ranging from the wz. 34 sabres and wz. 31 helmet to SHL motorcycles. It was also the main sponsor (and the namesake) of the now-defunct SHL Kielce sports club.

== History ==
In 1895 Ludwik Starke from Sosnowiec started a new iron foundry in Pstrążnica near Suchedniów. The new factory, since 1899 owned jointly by Starke, Tadeusz Jarmołowicz and Henryk Brunner, entered the markets of the Russian Empire with a variety of cast iron castings, including pots, frying pans, cast iron pipes and machinery parts. As part of the Old-Polish Industrial Region the new factory enjoyed considerable success and soon the crew rose to over 500 workers.

In 1907 Ludwik Starke's son, Stanisław, bought the Głęboczka farm at the outskirts of the city of Kielce with the intention of opening his own steelworks. However, it was not until the 12 August 1919 that the authorities of reborn Poland agreed to his plans. The new steelworks was named "Ludwików", after Starke's father, and remained part of the original joint stock company. Already in December of that year a provisional, wooden building of the first foundry became operational. The factory was powered by a single 65 HP traction engine built by Sächsische Maschinenfabrik. The first products were basic home appliances. The following year enamel workshop was completed and in 1922 the "Ludwików" works were expanded to include a power plant.

By the mid-1920s the steelworks increased production to 1860 tonnes of castings, distributed both in Poland and in Romania, Lithuania and Latvia. In 1926 the company owned also three large shops in Warsaw, Kraków and Łódź offering a wide range of agricultural machines: horse mills, threshing machines, reapers, winnowers and chaff cutters. In addition, the company also produced a wide variety of pipes, pots, kettles, stoves, ovens, horse cart parts and many more products. The same year the company received its first army order for drums of telephone wire.

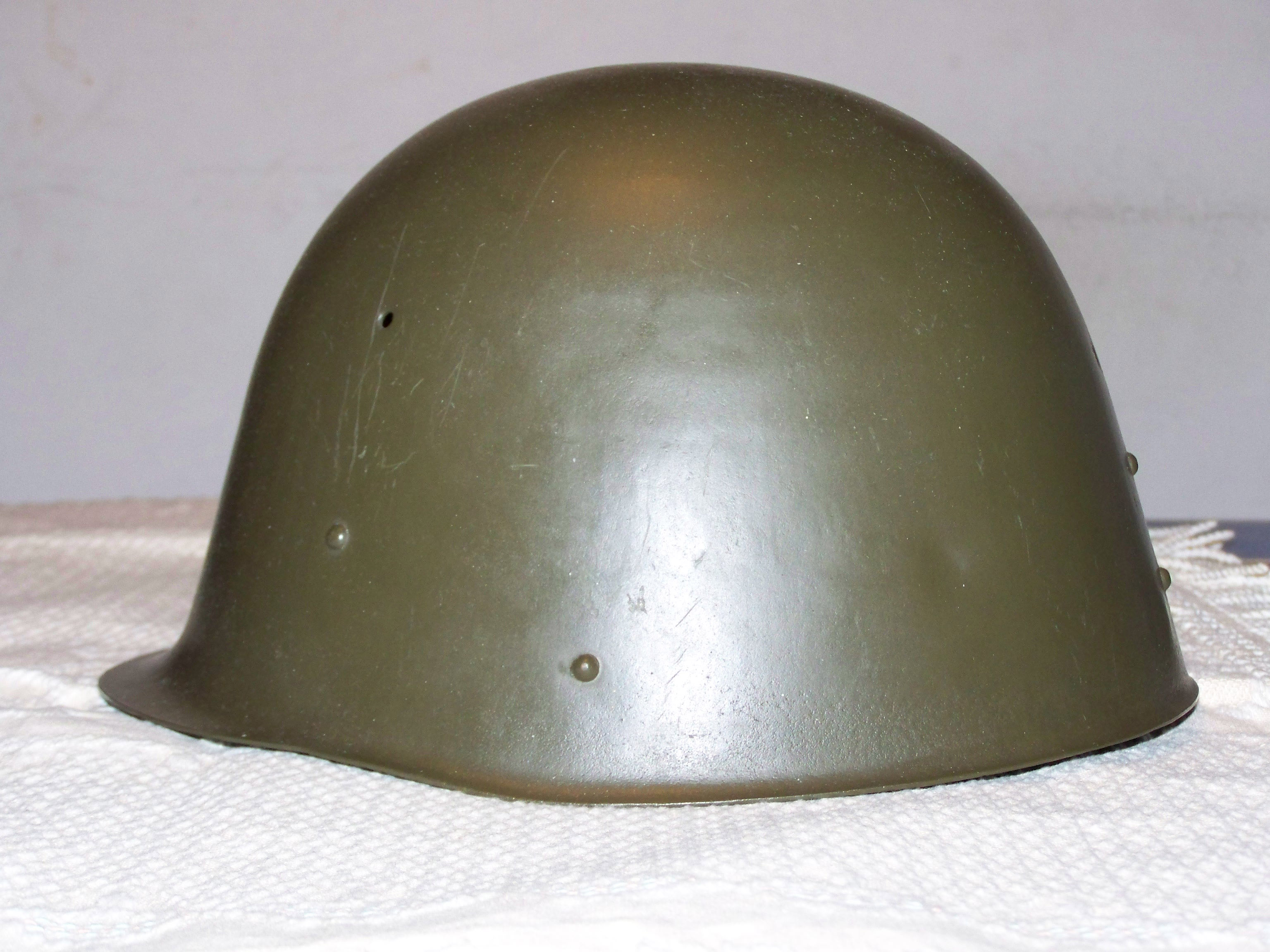
The wz.31/50 helmet in original colours

Initially the company was very successful and the new Kielce-based works have soon outgrown the original works at Suchedniów. However, the Great Depression stroke the company hard. In 1927 the owners had to split the company and 96% of shares of the Huta Ludwików were taken over by the Huta Pokój in Bytom, the largest steel company of Poland at that time. The new management, since 1931 led by Otmar Kwieciński, quickly restructured the factory and started expanding the product range to include more complex products. It also started to compete for renewed contracts with the Polish Army. In 1934 the first large success came: the newly renamed "Huta Ludwików Corporation" (Polish: Huta Ludwików - Spółka Akcyjna) became the sole producer of the new Hełm wz. 31 military helmet. Until 1939 over 300,000 were delivered. Another success came in 1936, when Huta Ludwików won another government contract, this time for the sabres for the cavalry. The Szabla wz. 34 was one of the best swords of the 20th century and was dubbed "ludwikówka", after the name of the company. Roughly 40,000 were delivered by the end of 1939. Also in 1936 the executives have signed a large contract with the Polish State Railways for delivery of thousands of railroad switches and signals. Soon afterwards additional contracts were signed for production of aerial bombs, grenade casings and

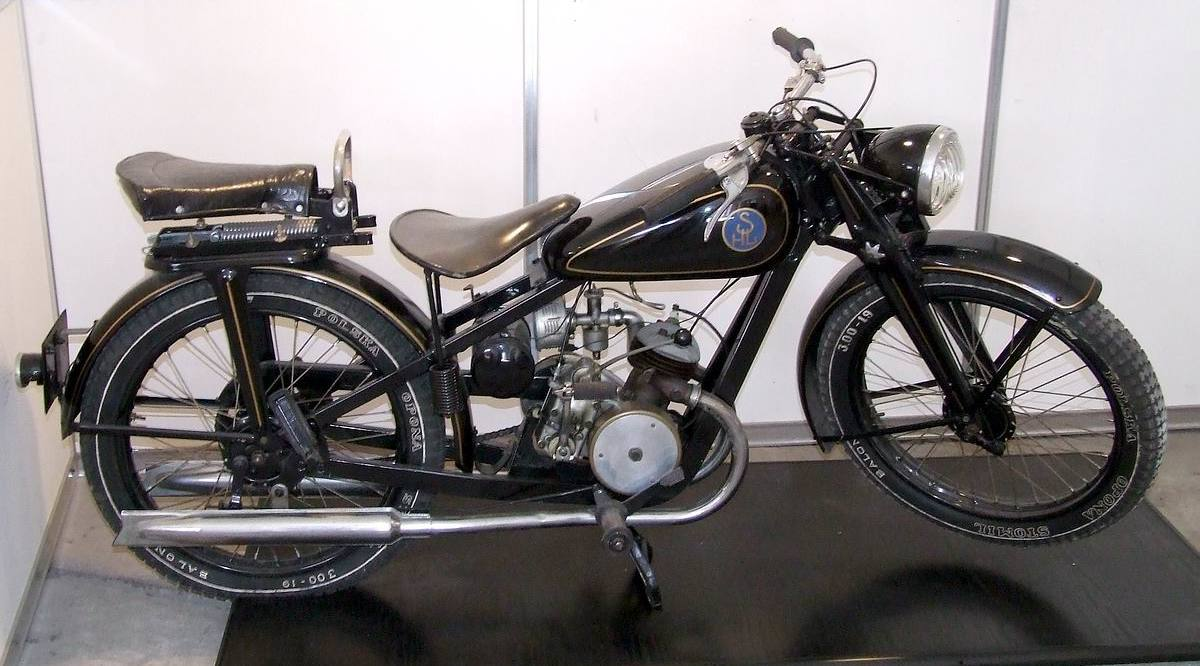
SHL 98 in Muzeum Techniki in Warsaw

The machine park was being constantly enhanced and by 1937 the new machines allowed for production of more complex products. That year design of a fast, agile and versatile motorcycle started. The SHL motorcycle, introduced in 1938, was designed by Rafał Ekielski, using British Villiers 98 cm^{3} 3 HP engines (parts of engines were locally manufactured). The motorcycle was named SHL 98 - SHL being a short of Suchedniowska Huta Ludwików (Ludwików Ironworks of Suchedniów, for the works were initially owned by a foundry in Suchedniów). The first batch of 1000 engines arrived together with the machines for their construction from Wolverhampton. The motorcycle, while not very powerful, proved popular as a cheaper alternative to imported motorcycles or the home-produced heavy-duty Sokół. The popularity of the new product made the entire factory adopt its logo and the now-iconic SHL abbreviation (probably derived from the words "Spółka Huta Ludwików" - "Huta Ludwików Company"). Despite the initial success, only less than 2,000 motorcycles were manufactured until the outbreak of World War II in 1939 and the German occupation.

Shortly before the war the engineering department started preparations for the production of SHL's first passenger car designed by Stanisław Pragłowski. However, the outbreak of World War II and the Nazi and Soviet Invasion of Poland brought end to the ambitious plans. The factory was confiscated by the Germans, given to the "Maschinen-und Waggonbau G.m.b.H" company as "Werke Ludwigshütte" while all modern machines were dismantled and sent to Germany. The motorcycle plant was turned into a repair workshop of the Wehrmacht, while the steel works continued to produce basic agricultural machinery and kettles. However, as the crew of the factory remained predominantly Polish, soon the factory started a clandestine life. After hours the workers secretly produced a wide variety of tools needed by the local population (axes, carbide lamps), but also barrels for the underground Vis pistol production. In 1943, following the liquidation of Kielce Ghetto, a minor work camp for roughly 300 Jews was set up nearby the factory. As the front was nearing, in late 1944 the German authorities dismantled virtually all remaining machines and sent them westwards, thus destroying the factory.

Following five years of German occupation, Kielce was captured by the Red Army on 15 January 1945. The city was badly damaged and the population dropped from over 70,000 in 1939 to 48,000 only five years later. However, despite the destruction the Huta Ludwików was reopened for business almost instantly. Already in February the first departments (enamel works, cast iron works, forge, mechanical workshop and sheet metal production line) were opened. In November 1945 many of the machines dismantled by the withdrawing Germans the previous year were discovered in Gliwice and were returned to Kielce, which allowed for production to resume at a much larger scale. The factory was rebuilt in a matter of months.

In line with the new economic principles of Soviet-controlled sphere of influence, the factory was nationalised in 1946 and renamed to "Kieleckie Zakłady Wyrobów Metalowych (KZWM) Polmo-SHL" (Kielce Factory of Metal Parts Polmo-SHL) soon afterwards. Already in 1947 the production of motorcycles was resumed. The first postwar model SHL 125 – M02 of 1947 was a mix of pre-war parts and frames of the SHL 98, with the German DKW RT 125 design, using a copy of the RT 125 engine, produced by PZL Psie Pole in Wrocław. A small series of 203 motorcycles was manufactured in State Automobile Workshops Nr.2 in Warsaw (later WFM works) and was similar to Sokół 125 of the same works. The production of the slightly improved SHL M03 (1948) and then SHL M04 (1949) were moved back to Kielce. All subsequent SHL motorcycles, regardless of the factory, were based in part on the pre-war SHL design. Altogether, until 1955 roughly 18,500 motorcycles of various types were delivered by the SHL. Simultaneously, the factory also resumed production of equipment for the army: the new hełm wz. 50 helmet and Granatnik PT-100, a Polish clone of the German Panzerfaust.

Meanwhile, in 1954 the production of Frania, the first post-war mass-produced washing machine in Poland started at SHL. In production until 1971, over 3 million pieces were sold, mostly in Poland. Also, in 1957 after a short hiatus the production of new SHL brand motorcycles resumed in Kielce and lasted until 1971. Their best moment was the 1960s, when over 180,000 of SHL M11 model left production lines in Kielce. In addition, in 1962 the Escorts group bought a licence to manufacture this model in India, under a brand Rajdoot. The license production lasted until 2005 and outlived their production in Poland by 35 years. Between 1961 and 1968 Eugeniusz Frelich, the factory test driver and constructor, won seven consecutive motorcycle road racing championships of Poland in a self-modified SHL 250 ccm, basically a serial SHL M11 with a larger engine. In 1966 he also came fifth during the Grand Prix motorcycle racing in Sweden and two years later gained the gold at the European Championships in Italy. During the 1960s it was decided to gradually phase out the construction of new SHL models and convert the factory to an automobile parts production plant. The SHL M-17 Gazela of 1969-1970 was the last SHL motorcycle produced in Poland.

In 1970 the factory started production of specialised road vehicles: tanks, all-terrain trucks and dump trucks. It also continued to provide auto parts to other Polish automobile manufacturers, notably the Polski Fiat, Nysa, Star, Żuk and Polonez. Thoroughly modernised after 1988, in 1990 the factory became the largest producer of castings in Central and Eastern Europe. However, the fall of the communist system of power and transition to market economy brought an end to a virtual monopoly on the Polish market. Reorganised in 1994, the factory was split into three separate companies: Zuga-SHL, Trans-Mot SHL and Auto-SHL. Eventually all were purchased in 2001 by Italian Metallurgica Assemblagii Carpenterie S.p.A. from Turin. After 2009 the original Huta Ludwików exists as two separate companies: Delfo Polska and SHL S.A. The earlier operates the central metal presses, while the latter continues the production of specialised vehicles and automotive parts, notably for FIAT and Volvo.
