= Szabla wz. 34 =

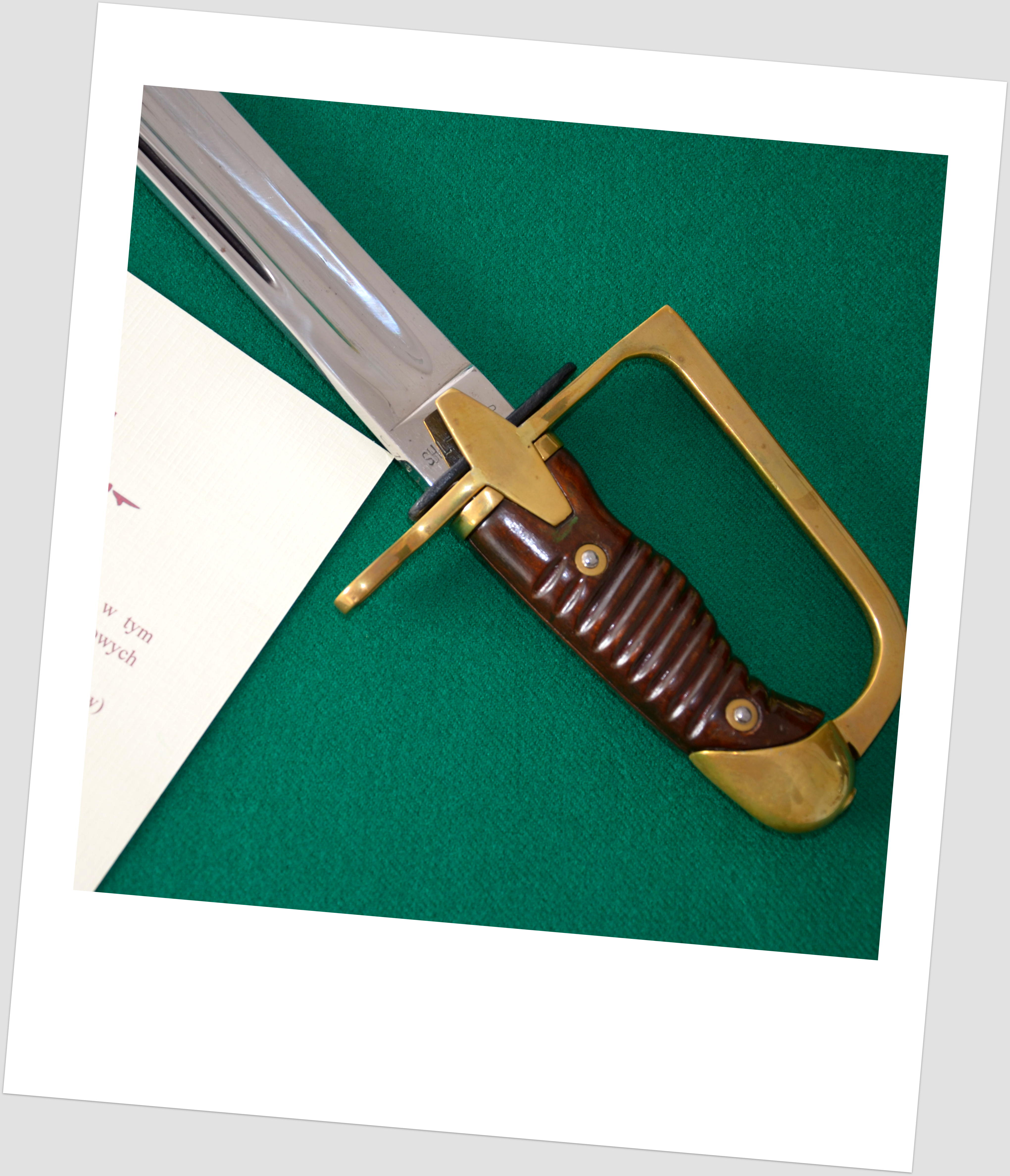
- Szabla wz. 1934 „Ludwikówka”
- Type: Sabre
- Place of origin: Poland

Szabla wz. 34 (lit. '1934 Pattern Szabla') was the last service sword issued to the Polish cavalry and other mounted units of the Polish Army. One of the finest weapons in a long list of Polish sabres reaching back to the early 16th century, although its introduction occurred as swords finally became obsolete as military weapons, it was successfully used in combat during the 1939 Invasion of Poland and remains in service (as Szabla wz. 1934/2002) as a ceremonial weapon.

== History ==
The Polish cavalry units have been using sabres rather than broadswords at least since the 16th century.

In the 18th century Poland ceased to exist as a sovereign nation in the effect of the partitions of Poland, but the Polish sabre, or szabla, remained in use.

First as a weapon of various Polish units serving in the armies of other powers, and then its use spread to practically all light cavalry units in Europe and elsewhere.

The British Pattern 1796 light cavalry sabre was perhaps the best-known clone of the sabre used by Polish hussars.

=== World War I ===
When Poland regained its independence in 1918, the renascent Polish Army inherited a wide variety of swords from the armies of German Empire, Russian Empire, and Austria-Hungary, as well as France, Italy, and many other states from where weapons were being imported during the Polish-Bolshevik War of 1920.

Experiences in the war shaped Polish Army organizational and operational doctrine. Unlike the trench warfare of World War I, the Polish-Soviet War was a conflict in which the cavalry's mobility played a decisive role.

Poland acknowledged the benefits of mechanization but was unable to invest heavily in many of the expensive, unproven inventions since then. In spite of this, Polish cavalry brigades were used as a mobile mounted infantry, but also continued to be trained in fencing for a possible sabre charge.

Because of that a need arose to create a new, standard weapon to be issued to all cavalry units of the Polish Army. In April 1921 the Ministry of Military Matters introduced the Szabla wz. 1921, a new design combining the features of various swords used by the Polish Army until that date.

Resembling the original 17th-century sabres, the new 1921 pattern was based primarily on the sabres produced during World War I in small numbers for the Polnische Wehrmacht (retroactively designated "Szabla wz. 1917").

The new sabre served as both a combat and ceremonial weapon of the Polish Army. This made the 1921 design not ideal for either cutting or thrusting, as compromises had to be made and the curvature was not the best suited for cavalry combat.

In 1934 the Warsaw-based Technical Institute of Armaments designed a new standard combat sabre for all mounted units of the Polish Army.

=== World War II ===
Unlike many contemporary designs such as the American Model 1913 Cavalry Saber or the British Pattern 1908 and 1912 cavalry swords, the Polish Szabla wz. 34 was used in actual combat on numerous occasions after the First World War.

Even by the late 1930s the Polish cavalry was primarily a formation of mounted infantry and was not supposed to be used as typical Napoleonic-era cavalry, during the German and Soviet Invasion of Poland of 1939 there were 16 confirmed cavalry charges in which the Polish units used the sabres against enemy soldiers. Contrary to a widespread yet counter-factual myth, most of them were successful.

The new weapon entered production in 1936 and immediately entered service as a standard sword of all mounted units of the army. By 1939 roughly 40,000 pieces have been delivered in four identical series of 9999 pieces each. On 1 July 1938 the Polish Army had 39,564 Pattern 1934 sabres in its stores and in first-line units.

=== Post-World Wars ===
While World War II put an end to the combat use of swords, the sabre remained a ceremonial weapon even in the Soviet-controlled army of the People's Republic of Poland. Soviet shashkas were initially used before being replaced by the Szabla wz. 1976.

In 2002, the Polish Army's Cavalry Squadron (Polish: Szwadron Kawalerii Wojska Polskiego), an all-cavalry honor guard unit, adopted the modernised Szabla wz. 1934/2002 sabre as the main ceremonial weapon.

== Design ==
While similar to the 1921 Pattern Sabre, the new sword was designed strictly as a combat weapon, with ergonomic grip, well-carved hilt and the curved blade designed for both powerful cuts and easy swings.

Comparison between Szabla wz. 21 and Szabla wz. 34
	Szabla wz. 21	Szabla wz. 34
Blade length	80 centimetres (31 in)	82.5 centimetres (32.5 in)
Hilt length	12 centimetres (4.7 in)	10.5 centimetres (4.1 in)
Weight	0.9 kilograms (2.0 lb)	0.91 kilograms (2.0 lb)
Weight (with sheath)	1.5 kilograms (3.3 lb)	1.46 kilograms (3.2 lb)

Unlike many contemporary designs, the sheathed sword was almost flat, which facilitated carrying the weapon and attaching it to a standard cavalry saddle.

Unlike the earlier models, the new sabre was being produced by a single factory, the Kielce-based Huta Ludwików (hence the name ludwikówka often applied to the wz.34). This allowed for much higher production standards and much higher uniformity.

According to a post-war evaluation by one of the users, Capt. Eng. Janusz Wielhorski,

"it was commonly seen as a perfect weapon. Well-balanced, nicely fitting, and uncommonly easy to cut with. Out of 100 contemporary French broadswords only two or three could cut nicely, while all wz. 34 sabres I used were perfect for that".

In addition, prior to delivery, each piece of weapon had to undergo a series of rigorous stress-tests:

- when dropped free from the height of 2 metres it was to pierce a steel sheet 2 millimetres (0.079 in) thick
- cut five 5 mm steel bars without damaging the edge
- survive a powerful blows into a hardwood stub with the flat and the spine, without any damages to the blade
- the blade pressed against a hardwood stub was to bend 150 millimetres (5.9 in) to either side without breaking or deforming
- the sheath placed flat on two bricks was to survive a 120 kilograms (260 lb) force

== Variants ==
=== Szabla wz. 1976 ===
Parade sabre for use by the Polish Land Forces (wz. 1976 WP) and the Polish Navy (wz. 1976 MW). Designed by the Polish Army Museum.

Both variants were based on the original pre-war wz. 34, but also included design elements from earlier sabres, notably from the 17th century hussar sabre and World War I German cavalry sabres.

The initial batch was manufactured in the museum, later the Łódź-based WiFaMa factory took over and continues to manufacture short batches of the wz. 1976.

=== Szabla wz. 1934/2002 ===
Manufactured by the WiFaMa works, the new sabre is basically identical to the pre-war wz. 1934.
