= Szabla =

Polish word for "sabre", widely used in the Polish-Lithuanian Commonwealth

Szabla (Polish pronunciation: [ˈʂabla]; plural: szable) is the Polish word for sabre.

The sabre was in widespread use in the Polish–Lithuanian Commonwealth during the early modern period, especially by light cavalry in the 17th century. The sabre became widespread in Europe following the Thirty Years' War and was also adopted by infantry. In particular, it served as one of the symbols of the nobility and aristocracy (szlachta), who considered it to be one of the most important pieces of men's traditional attire.

== Types ==
=== Hungarian-Polish szabla ===
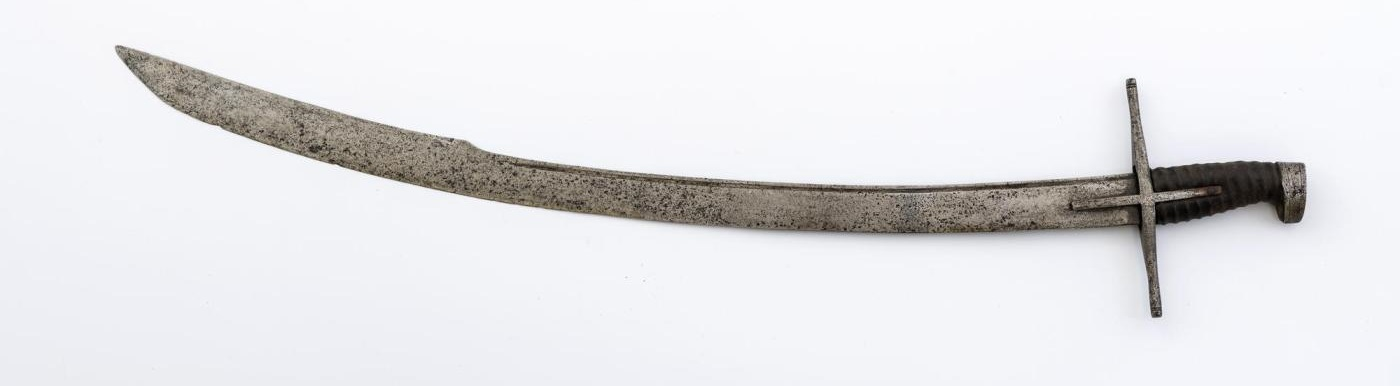
Hungarian-Polish sabre, 16/17th century

The first type of szabla, the Hungarian-Polish (węgiersko-polska), was popularized among the szlachta during the reign of the Transylvanian-Hungarian King of Poland Stefan Batory in the late 16th century. It featured a large, open hilt with a cross-shaped guard formed from quillons and upper and lower langets and a heavy blade. The single edged blade was either straight or only slightly curved. Since the saber provided little to no hand protection, a chain was attached from the cross-guard to the pommel. Since a number of such weapons were made by order of the king himself during his reform of the army and were engraved with his portrait, this kind of sabre is also referred to as batorówka – after Batory's name.

=== Armenian szabla ===
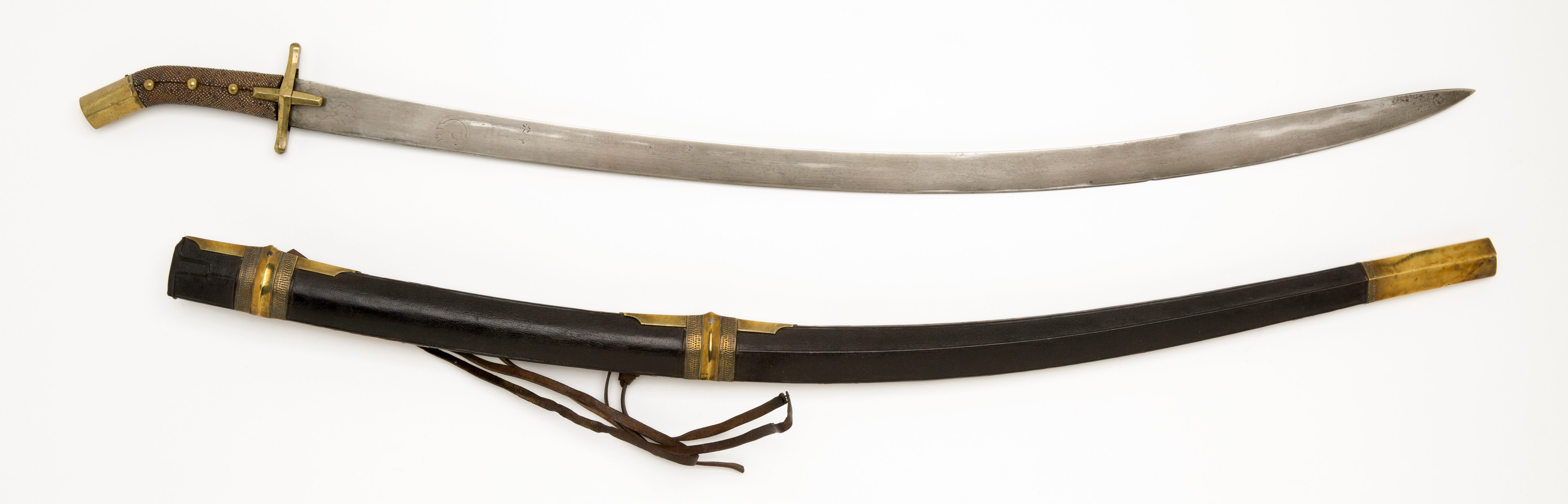
Armenian sabre (czeczuga), 17th century

In the late 17th century, the first notable modification of the sabre appeared. Unlike the early "Hungarian-Polish" type, it featured a protected hilt and resembled the curved sabres of the East. It was hence called the Armenian sabre, possibly after Armenian merchants and master swordsmiths who formed a large part of arms makers of the Commonwealth at those times. In fact, the Armenian sabre developed into three almost completely distinct types of swords, each used for a different purpose. Their popularity and efficiency made the Polish nobles abandon the broadswords commonly used in Western Europe.

- Czeczuga was a curved sabre with a small cross-guard with an ornamented open hilt and a hood offering partial protection to the hand.
- Ordynka was a heavier weapon used by the cavalry. It resembled a mixture of all the features of the Czeczuga with a heavier and more durable hilt and blade of the short sword.
- Armenian karabela was the first example of a ceremonial sword used by the szlachta. It had both its blade and cross-guard curved, and had a short grip. It was engraved and decorated with precious stones and ivory. Used throughout the ages, in the 18th century it evolved into a standard karabela, used both as a part of attire and in combat.

=== Hussar szabla ===
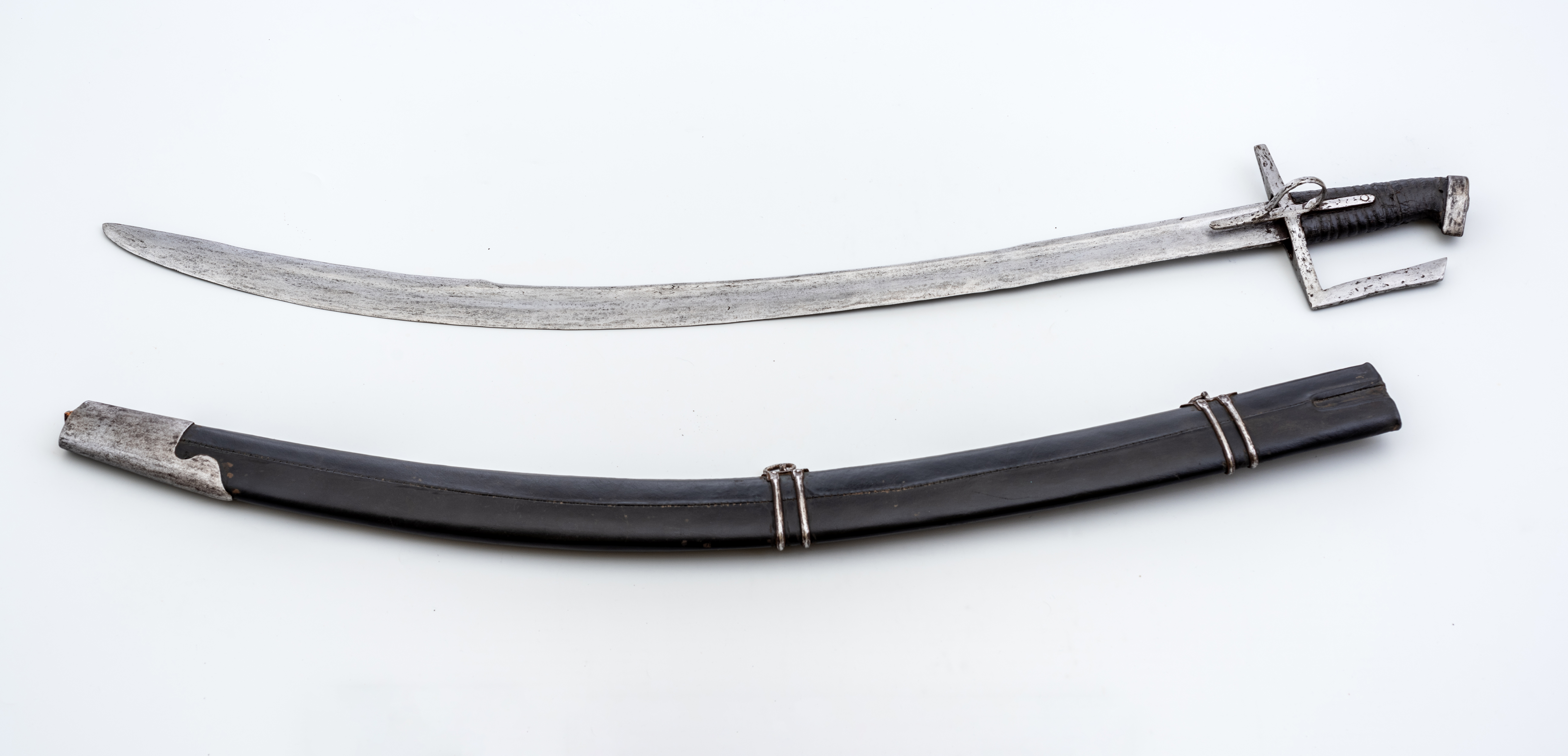
Polish hussar sabre, 17th century

The hussar sabre was the best-known type of szabla of its time, and was a precursor to many similar types of European swords. Introduced around 1630, it served as a Polish cavalry melee weapon, mostly used by heavy cavalry, or Polish Hussars. Much less curved than its Armenian predecessors, it was ideal for horseback fighting and allowed for much faster and stronger strikes. The heavier, almost fully closed hilt offered both good protection of the hand and much better control over the sabre during a skirmish. Two feather-shaped pieces of metal on both sides of the blade called moustache (wąsy) offered greater durability of the weapon by strengthening its weakest point: the joint between the blade and the hilt. The soldier fighting with such sabre could use it with his thumb extended along the back-strap of the grip for even greater control when 'fencing' either on foot or with other experienced horsemen or, by using the thumb-ring, a small ring of steel or brass at the junction of the grip and the cross-guard through which the thumb is placed, could give forceful downward swinging cuts from the shoulder and elbow with a 'locked' wrist against infantry and less experienced horsemen. This thumb ring also facilitated faster 'recovery' of the weapon for the next cut. A typical hussar szabla was relatively long, with the average blade of 85 centimetres (33 in) in total. The tip of the blade, was usually 15 to 17 centimetres (5.9 to 6.7 in) long and in most cases bore a false edge. Such sabres were extremely durable yet stable and were used in combat well into the 19th century.

The Polish and Hungarian szabla's design influenced a number of other designs in other parts of Europe and led to the introduction of the sabre in Western Europe. An example that bears a considerable resemblance is the famous British 1796 pattern Light Cavalry Sabre, which was designed by Captain John Gaspard le Marchant after several visits to Central and Eastern Europe and research being conducted into those and other nations' cavalry tactics and weapons. Poland had ceased to exist as a separate nation, but Hungary was still an existing nation and was the source of all things "Hussar", it was the Polish-Hungarian szable of 150 years earlier, rather than the oftened-quoted Indian tulwar, that was the main source of inspiration for the first "mainly cutting" sabre in the British Army. The same "1796" sabre was taken up by the King's Hanoverian troops and also by the Prussians under General Gebhard Leberecht von Blücher, who attempted to give his name to the weapon, which is almost universally known as "the 1796 Light Cavalry Sabre" in the rest of Europe. This weapon also found its way into the cavalry of the newly-formed United States during the War of 1812.

=== Karabela szabla ===
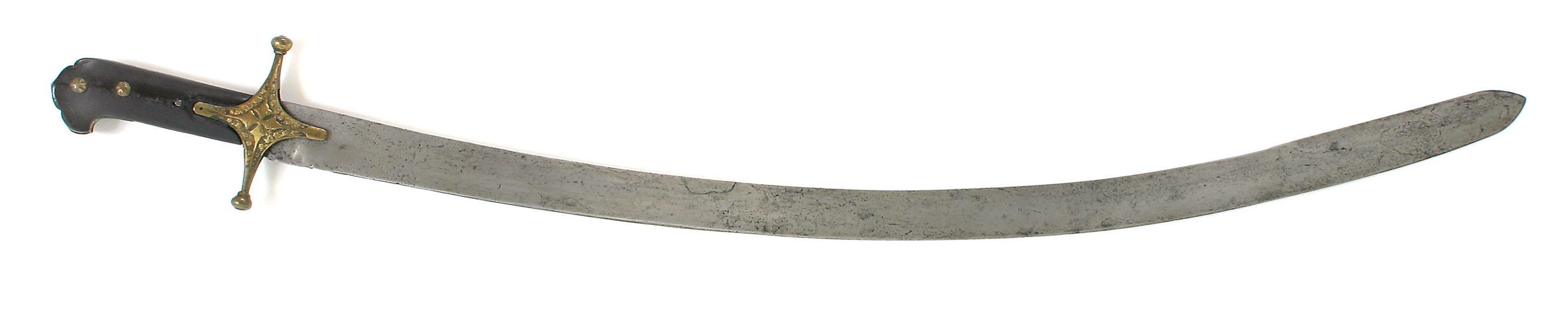
Karabela sabre, 17th century

The karabela entered service around 1670.

A karabela was a type of szabla popular in the Polish–Lithuanian Commonwealth in the 1670s.

The word "karabela" does not have a well-established etymology, and different theories have been put forward. For example, Zygmunt Gloger suggests derivation from the name of the Iraqi city of Karbala, known for trade of this kind of sabre.

=== Other types ===
- Kosciuszkowska, a variant popularized during the Kościuszko Uprising;
- Szabla wz.34 ("pattern 34 szabla"), a 20th-century variant produced from 1934 in the Second Polish Republic for Polish cavalry; just about 40,000 were made.

== See also ==
- Shashka
