= Hełm wz. 31 =

Polish combat helmet (1933–1960)

wz. 31
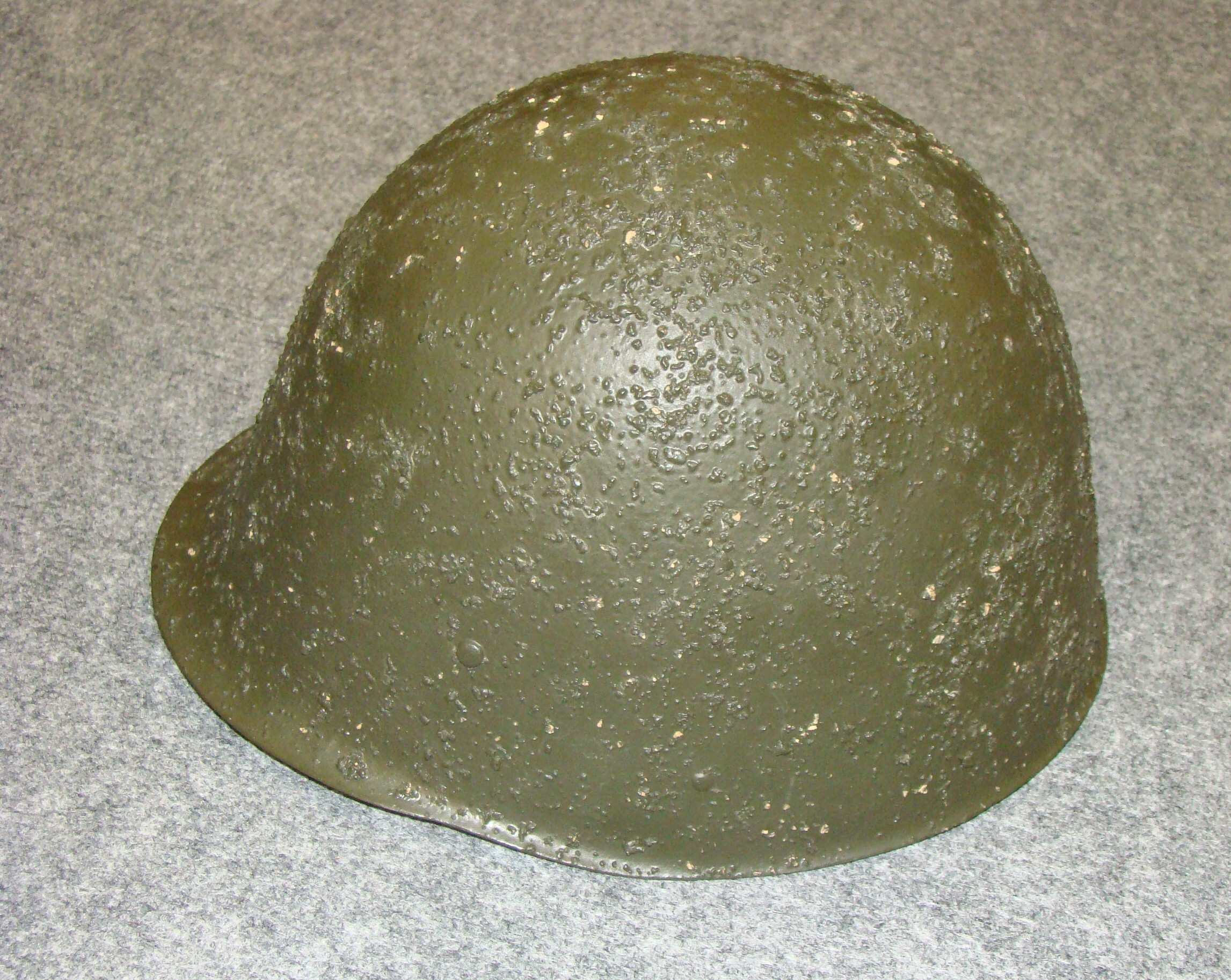
- The wz.31 helmet with grainy Salamandra surface
- Type: Combat helmet
- Place of origin: Poland

Service history
- In service: 1933-1960
- Used by: See Users for details
- Wars: World War II: Polish Defensive War of 1939; Winter War; Operation Tempest

Production history
- Designed: 1930-1931
- Manufacturer: Huta Ludwików; Huta Silesia
- Produced: 1931-1939
- No. produced: 320 000 (1939)
- Variants: wz. 31; wz. 31/50

Specifications
- Weight: 1,3 kg

The hełm wz. 31 (helmet, 1931 pattern) was the basic combat helmet of the Polish Army before the outbreak of World War II and during the Invasion of Poland. The helmet became the basic type of combat headgear for Polish military formations in the 1930s and during the early stages of World War II. It was also exported to Persia, Albania and Republican Spain. By September 1939 approximately 320,000 helmets were delivered to the Polish Army.

While it was not the most common helmet in Polish service during World War II (in 1939 most of the mobilised soldiers were issued old French Adrian helmets), it became somewhat iconic and widely regarded in Poland as one of the symbols of Polish resistance. Because of this, the hełm wz. 67 designed in the late 1960s was based on the wz.31's silhouette.

== Design ==
The wz. 31 was an all-metal one-piece helmet with a distinctive peaked visor and a slight "skirt." It was covered with either plain or Salamandra matte paint. Most helmets were covered with a thick layer of lead tetroxide and then painted with standard all-military khaki, with some of them painted grey, greyish green or navy blue (the latter worn by the police). The weight of the complete set with inner lining was approximately 1.3 kg. The helmet could be worn with the visor backwards, which was used by artillery officers for increased visibility and better peripheral vision.

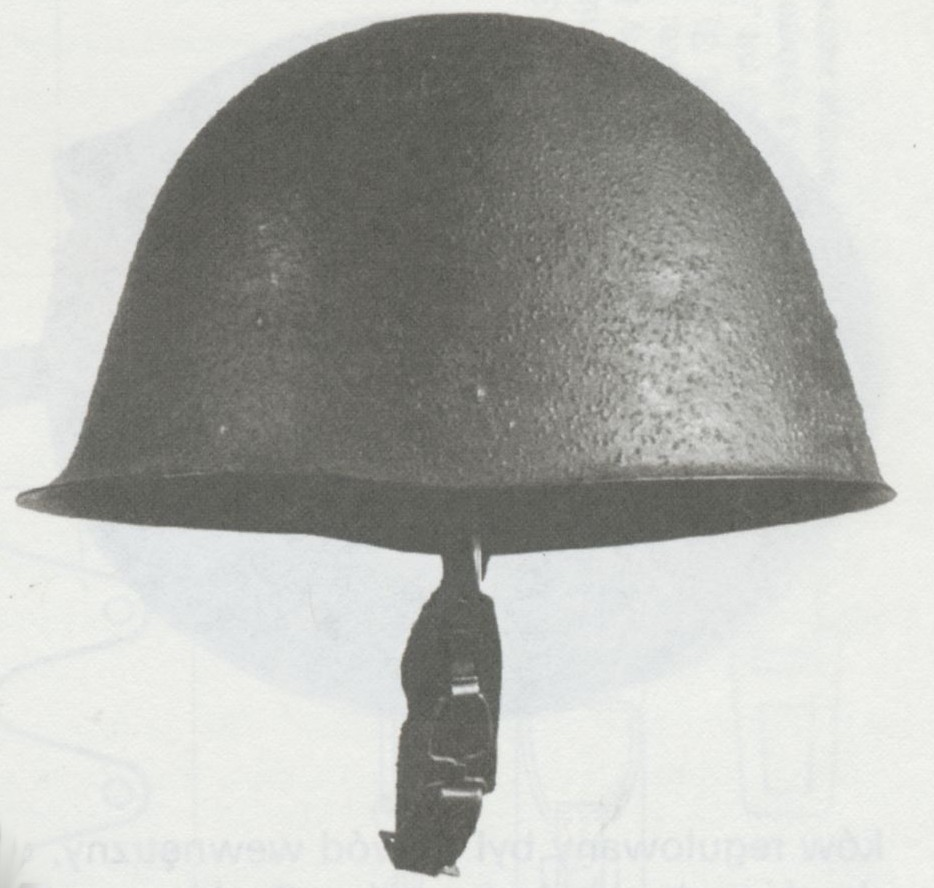
The wz.31 helmet with grainy Salamandra surface

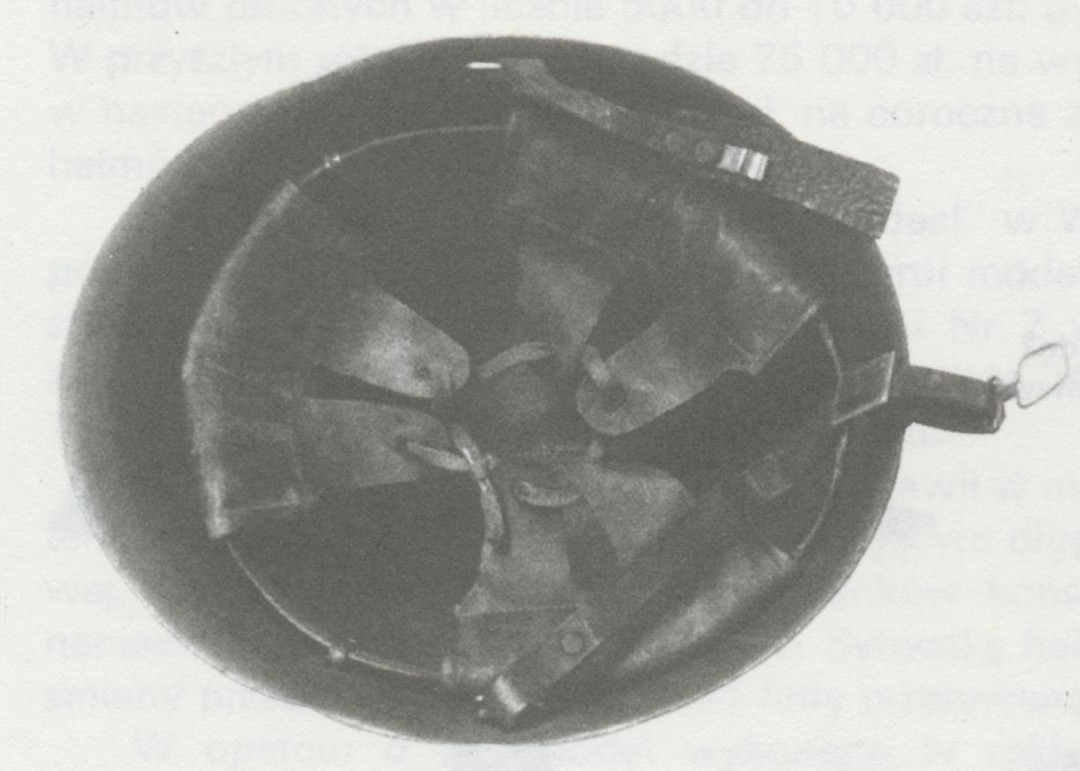
Liner system used in wz. 31

== History ==
After the end of World War I Poland seized large quantities of helmets from other countries formerly occupying its territory. Among the most widely used was the German M1918 helmet, better known as the Stahlhelm. Large numbers of French Adrian helmets were also being used. However, as the shape of the helmet was one of the most distinctive marks on the battlefield, already in 1919 the Polish Army started working on a genuine Polish helmet, distinct from those used by the armies of surrounding countries and offering better protection than the German helmet.

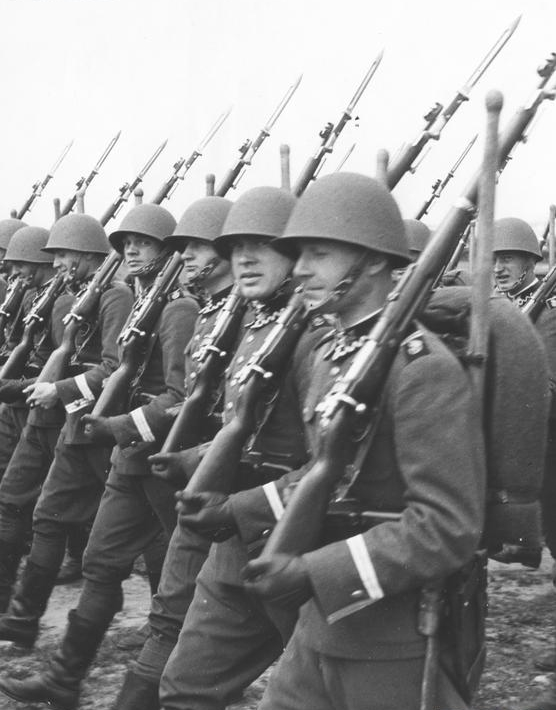
Polish soldiers wearing the wz.31 helmet, 1939

The initial work on a new helmet was directed by the IBMU institute in Warsaw, with the chief engineer being Leonard Krauze. The design team created an outer shell, but the design process came to a halt in mid-1920s due to problems with the inner lining and production process preparation. It was decided to purchase a ready-made design or use a technological process developed in another country. Swedish Eskilstuna Stal Pressing AB steel mill was chosen as the contractor and a Polish commission spent several weeks observing the Swedish technology. In the end the Polish ministry of military affairs decided to buy a license for Swedish helmet suspension and liners, and to design a custom outer shell.

The shell was based on an earlier Polish design, the hełm wz. 30 which never entered serial production. The most notable modification included liquidation of the horn-like ventilator lugs, similar to the ones found on early German helmets. 300 copies of the modernised design were ordered for testing and were then extensively modified by the Pokój steel mill, the Warsaw-based Arms Factory No. 2 and the Wolbrom-based Ideal works. Simultaneously, the Warsaw-based "W. Karpiński and M. Leppert" factory designed a new type of grainy non-glossy paint to eliminate light reflection. The new paint was patented under the name of "Salamandra" (salamander) and accepted by the ministry.

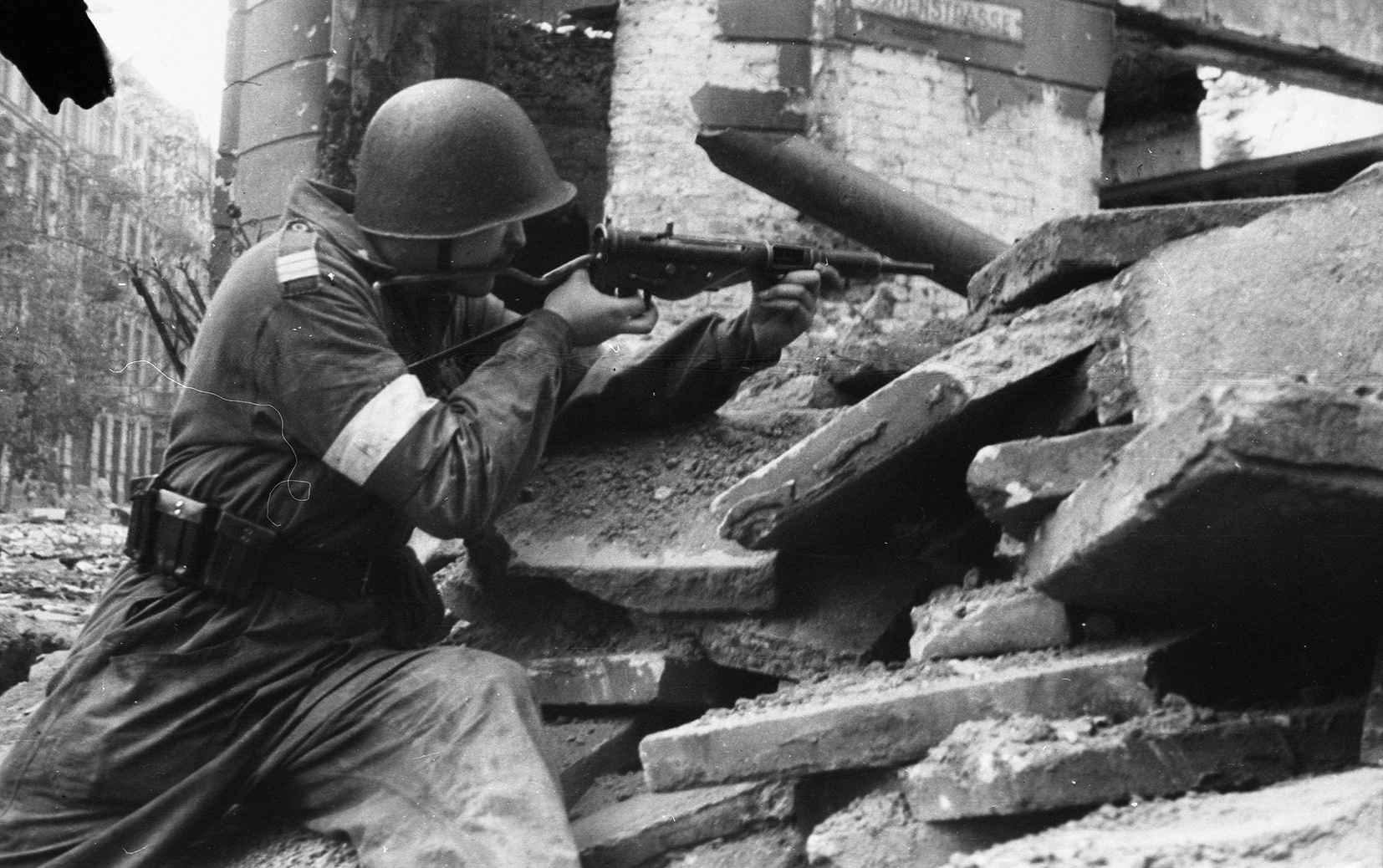
An insurgent during the Warsaw Uprising wearing wz.31 helmet, 1944

The tests of the modernised 1930 design were successful and by September 1932 the first 120 copies were made by the Bismarck and Silesia steel mills, the latter equipped with a complete production line of German World War I Stahlhelm helmets. Further tests at the Infantry Training Centre in Rembertów near Warsaw led to further minor modifications. Finally the Ministry chose two steel mills as contractors for serial production. The Kielce-based Huta Ludwików factory started serial production of helmet shells from a nickel-chrome-molybdenum steel alloy provided by the Baildon Steel Mill. At the same time some of the helmets were being produced from less durable manganese steel. Due to project's secrecy it was officially referred to in military purchase orders as "kettle production". Initially costing 21,70 złoty apiece, with time the price dropped to 16,50 złoty.

The wz. 67 helmet produced in the times of the Polish People's Republic referred in its shape to the pre-war wz. 31, initially it was even supposed to be painted with anti-reflective "Salamandra" varnish, but this idea was abandoned.

== Service ==
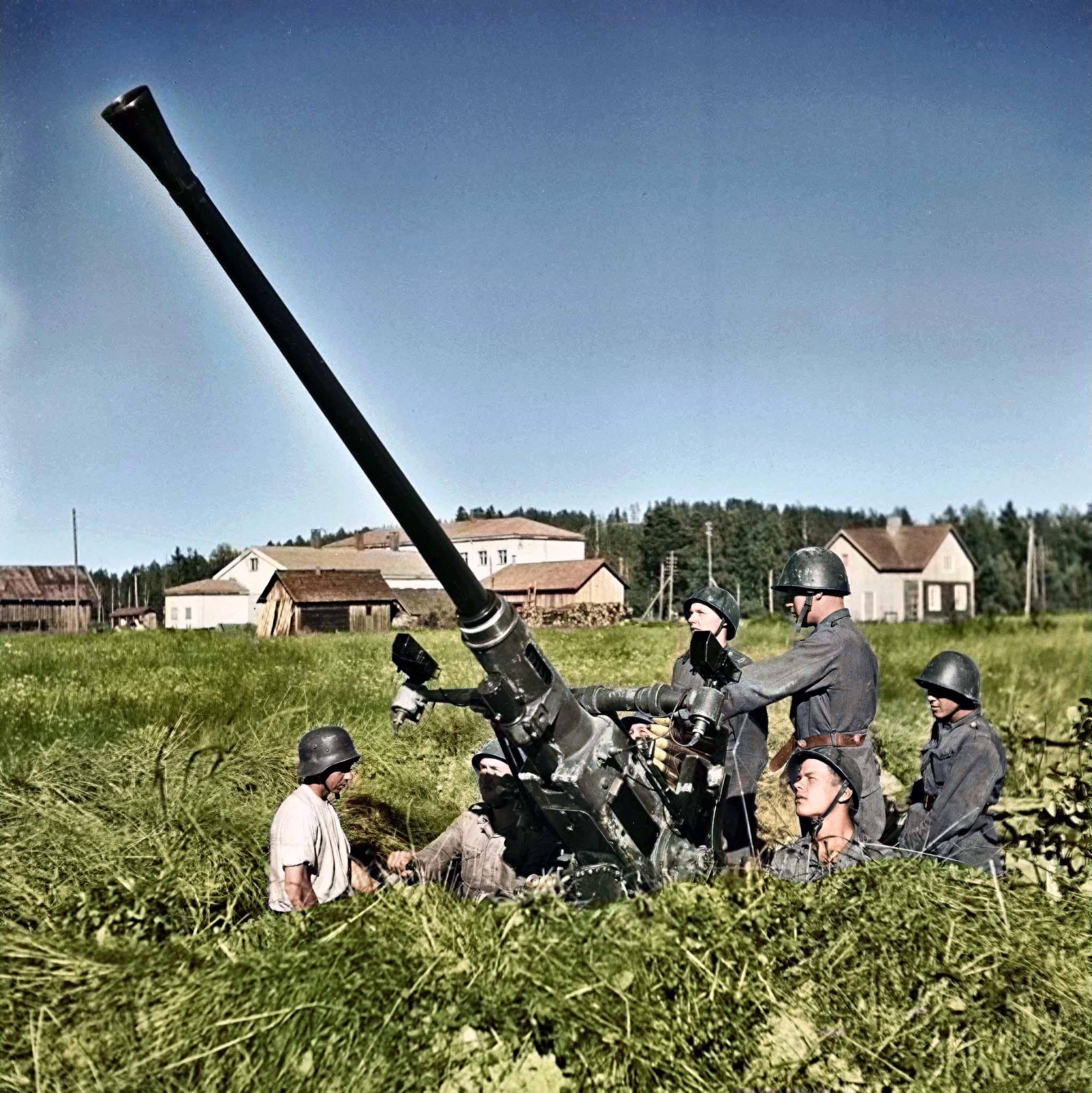
Hełm wz. 31 in Finnish service, 1944.

The first batches of serially-produced helmets entered field service in January 1933. Initially issued to infantry and artillery, in time it was also provided to the Polish Navy and Border Protection Corps. The Border Guards and State Police were provided with a variant of the wz.31 helmet with a large (10 centimetres in diameter) White Eagle adorning the forehead. However, at the end of the 1930s it was determined that the standard Polish wz. 31 helmet was unsuitable for tank troops and motorized units; while offering decent protection, it was too large and heavy. Because of that most of motorised units continued to use German Stahlhelms, while the cavalry used the French Adrian Helmet. The latter was also issued to many of the units mobilised in 1939.

After the conquest of Poland in 1939, the Germans passed some of the captured Polish wz. 31 helmets to their Luftschutz (civilian anti-aircraft defense) units and sent 1,000 pieces to Finland (Winter War). Red Army soldiers also occasionally used captured Polish helmets. It is estimated that about 200,000 wz. 31 helmets ended up in foreign hands.

During the occupation, many partisans of the Polish underground used wz. 31 helmets in addition to captured German Stahlhelm helmets. This is particularly visible during the Warsaw Uprising in 1944.

After World War II, due to the shortage of Soviet SSh-40 helmets in the Polish People's Army, it was decided to include surviving pre-war wz. 31 helmets in the equipment. The helmets were modified, equipped with new and often different facings fastened with additional rivets and using a new smooth paint job. The helmet created in this way was adopted as wz. 31/50, using mainly pre-war wz. 31 examples or unfinished shells found in significant quantities in the storage field of the "Ludwików" Steelworks. Most of these helmets did not have the technical inspection rivet characteristic of wz. 31.

The wz. 31/50 helmets were painted smoothly in khaki (for the army) or blue for civil defense. The wz. 31/50 helmets were also occasionally used in the equipment of various Polish paramilitary organizations. Based on wz. 31/50, a helmet intended for fire brigades equipped with a comb was also created.

== Variants ==
=== Export version ===
The export variants were identical to the original wz. 31 helmet except for the paint: instead of standard khaki used in Poland the Spanish Republic used black mat.

=== Hełm wz. 31/50 ===
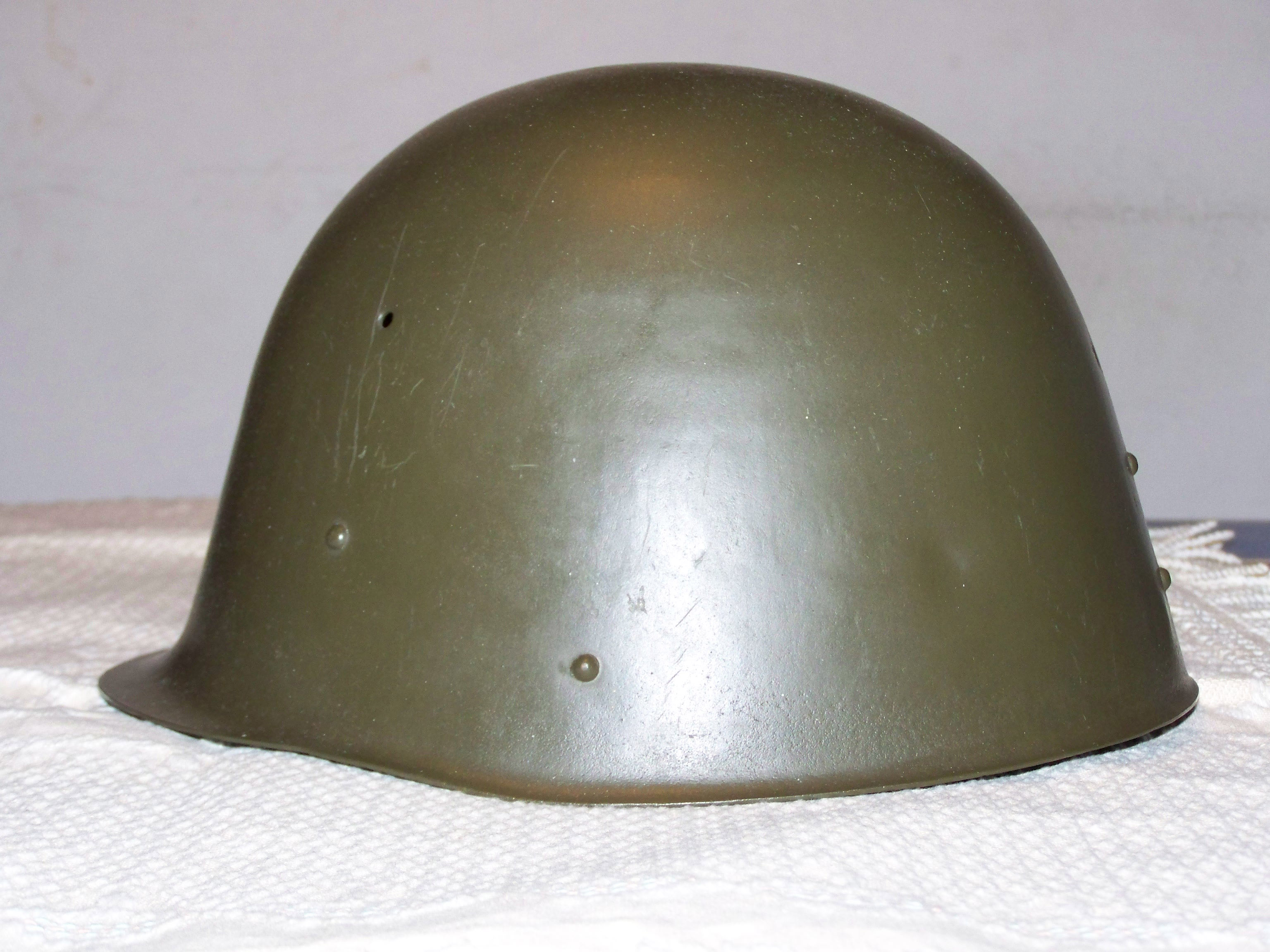
The wz. 31/50 helmet in plain colour

While the production of the wz.31 ended with the German and Soviet occupation of Poland in 1939, the Kielce-based Huta Ludwików retained large numbers of original helmet shells in its warehouses. After the war production did not resume and instead the Polish Army was equipped with Soviet Ssch-40 helmets. However, the remaining wz.31 shells were fitted with lining from German M1935 or wz. 50 helmet and issued to various military colleges, paramilitary organizations and civil defense.

== Users ==
- Poland – Standard issue helmet of Polish Army in 1933-1939. Also used in LOPP, Police and Border Protection Troops. Model variant 31/50 in use until the end of the 1960s.
  - Polish Underground State – widely used during the Warsaw Uprising.
- Nazi Germany – Luftschutz make use of stocks left over or acquired from Polish Army.
- Finland – wz. 31 helmets captured in 1939 were donated by the Third Reich.
- Soviet Union – limited use of helmets captured in 1939.
- Spanish Republic – exported from Poland during the Spanish Civil War.
- Imperial State of Iran – exported from Poland in 1930s.
