= Karabela =

Type of sabre widely used in the Polish-Lithuanian Commonwealth

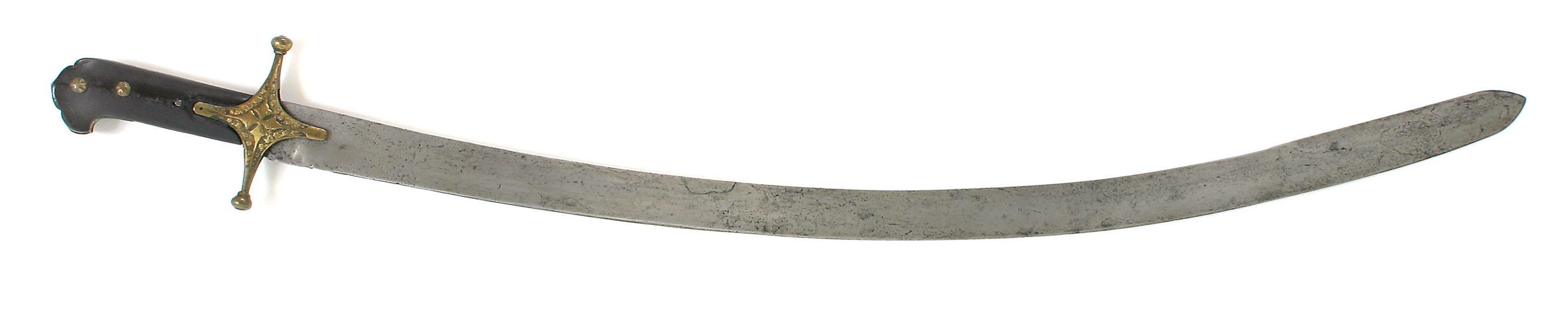
Karabela sabre, 17th century

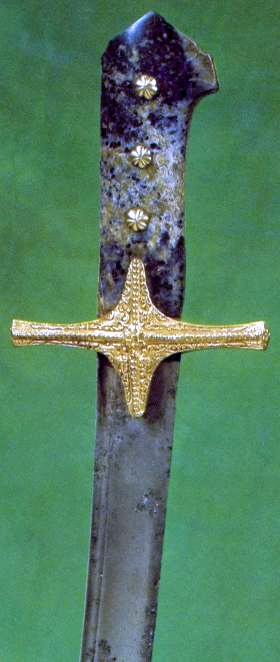
Karabela of King Sigismund III of Poland

A karabela was a type of Polish sabre (szabla) popular in the Polish–Lithuanian Commonwealth. Polish fencer Wojciech Zabłocki defines a karabela as a decorated sabre with the handle stylized as the head of a bird and an open crossguard.

== Etymology ==
The word "karabela" does not have well-established etymology, and different versions are suggested.

- Zygmunt Gloger suggests derivation from the name of the Iraqi city of Karbala, known for trade of this kind of sabres.
- Around 1670, the karabela (from Turkish karabela "black bane") evolved, based on Ottoman Janissary kilij sabres; it became the most popular sword-form in the Polish army. During 17th and 18th centuries, curved sabers that evolved from Ottoman kilij were widespread throughout Europe.

Another suggestion is that the name originated from the most popular Seljuk sword named Kara-bela. Other suggestion is that its name derives from the Turkish town of Karabel, in the vicinity of İzmir, or the Karabel district in Crimea.

== See also ==
- Kilij

== Bibliography ==
- Włodzimierz Kwaśniewicz "1000 słów o broni białej i uzbrojeniu ochronnym" MON, Warszawa 1981, ISBN 83-11-06559-4
- PWN Leksykon: Wojsko, wojna, broń, Wydawnictwo Naukowe PWN, Warszawa 2001, ISBN 978-83-01-13506-5
- Włodzimierz Kwaśniewicz: Dzieje szabli w Polsce, Dom Wydawniczy Bellona, Warszawa 1999, ISBN 83-11-08921-3
