= Shashka =

North Caucasian/Cossack sword

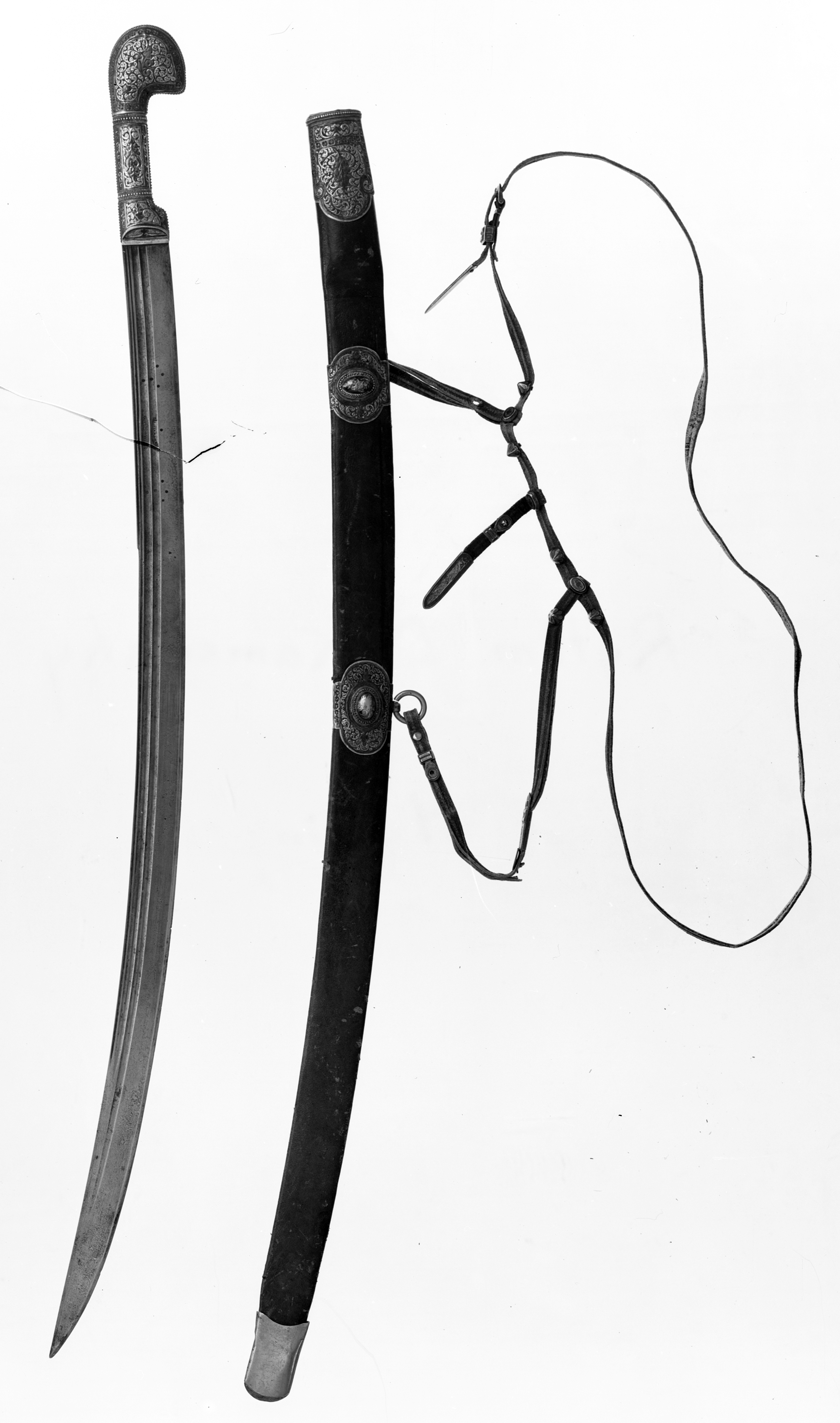
- Caucasian shashka
- Type: Sword
- Place of origin: Caucasus (Probably Georgia)

Production history
- Produced: 1600 to present (Still in use by Jordan's royal Circassian guard)

Specifications
- Mass: approx. 0.3–1 kg (0.66–2.20 lb)
- Blade length: approx. 65–86 cm (26–34 in)
- Blade type: Curved, single-edged
- Hilt type: Single-handed swept, Without guard
- Scabbard/sheath: wood and leather decorated with brass, gold and silver.

The shashka or shasqua (Abkhaz: аҳәа, асахәа; Adyghe: сэшхуэ, [saʃxʷa] – long-knife; Chechen: гlорда, гlурда/терс-маймал; Dargin: шушкIа; Georgian: ჭოლაური, ch'olauri; Ingush: гурде/г1ама; Lezgin: шуьш; Ossetian: ахсан/ахсæн, шашкæ; Russian: шашка) is a kind of Caucasian sabre: a single-edged, single-handed, and guardless sabre. The comparatively gentle curve of a shashka blade puts the weapon midway between a radically curved sabre and a straight sword, effective for both cutting and thrusting.

== Etymology ==
The word shashka originally came from Adyghe: сэшхуэ, romanized: saʃxʷa, lit. 'long knife'.

== History ==
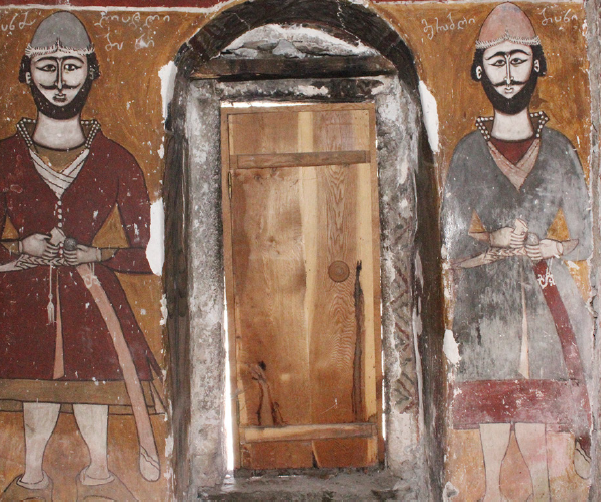
The earliest depictions of Shashka date to the early 17th century in west Georgia

The shashka originated among the mountain tribes of the Caucasus. The earliest depictions of this sword date to the early 17th century in west Georgia.The earliest datable example is from 1713. The first known written mention of the word "shashka" dates back to 1747 when listing the weapons of the Chechens, though most extant shashkas have hilts dating to the 19th century.

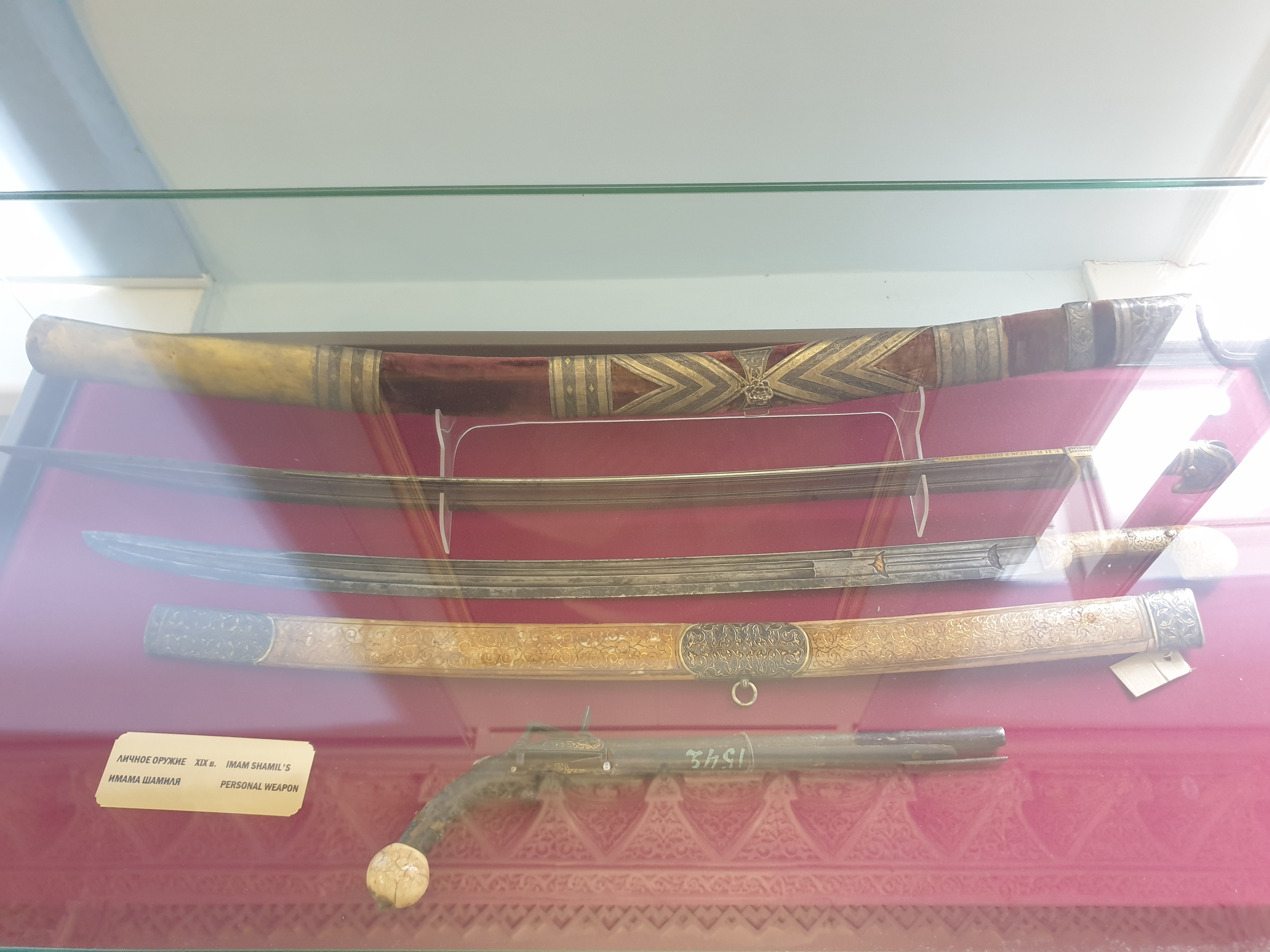
Shashkas of Imam Shamil

Russian troops, having encountered it during their conquest of the Caucasus (1817–1864), preferred it to their issued sabres and later, most of the Russian troops and Cossacks adopted the weapon. In 1834 the Russian government produced the first military-issue shashka pattern. It gradually replaced the sabre in all cavalry units except hussars during the 19th century. Despite the shashka model limited adoption at the time, Ataman Matvei Platov commendably led an 8,000-strong cavalry charge of Don Cossacks, successfully breaching Napoleon's formidable infantry squares during the Battle of Leipzig on October 18, 1813, thereby showcasing the vulnerability of even highly disciplined formations to sword-based attacks.

The blades of non-regulation shashkas were of diverse origins; some were locally made in the Caucasus, others in Russia, some were manufactured in Germany, mostly in Solingen, and displayed imitations of the 'running wolf' mark of Passau.

== Types ==
There were several types of shashka:

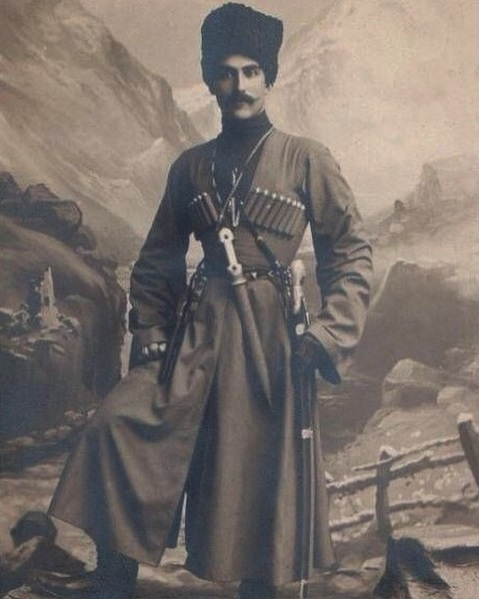
Ingush man with "handle inside scabbard" Shashka.

- The Caucasus type: The most ancient type. It has two types, "handle inside scabbard" and "handle fit to scabbard".
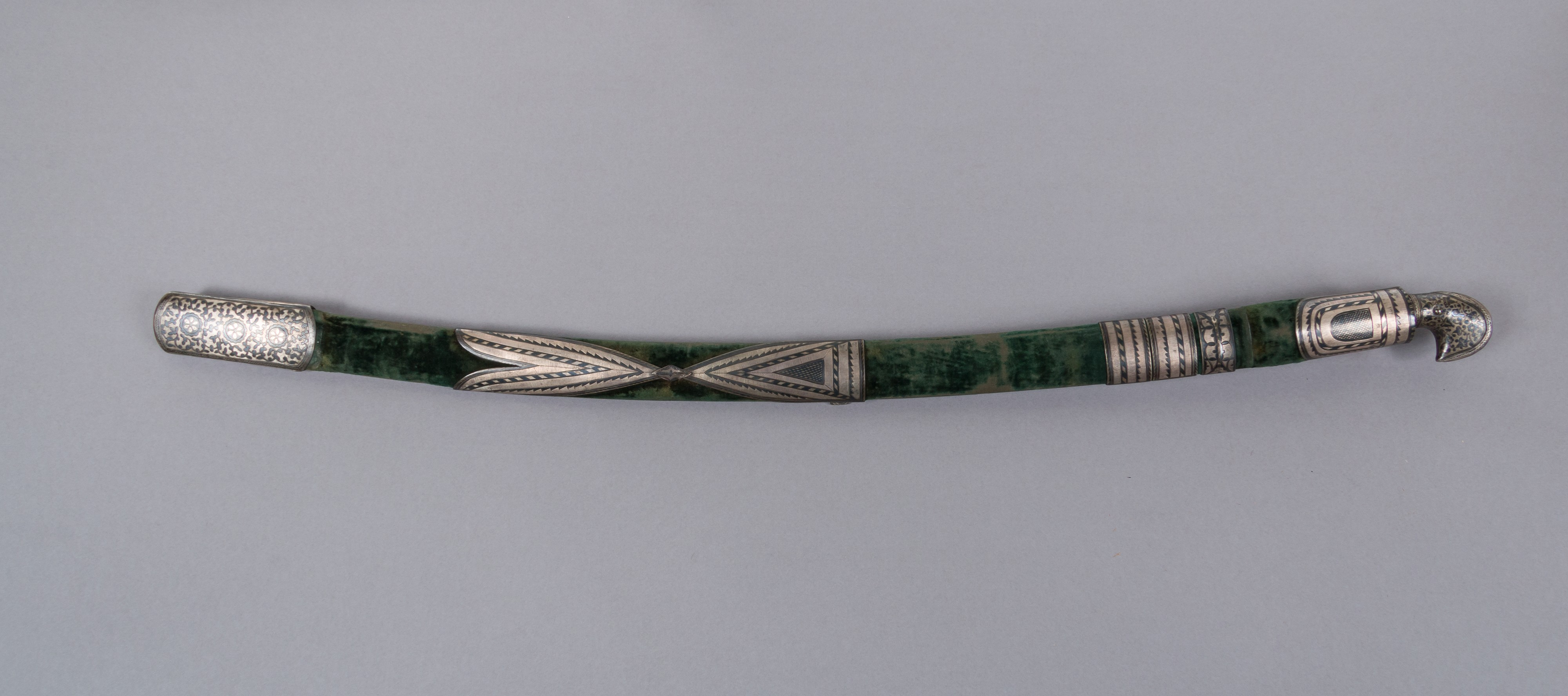
  Caucasian Shashka "handle inside scabbard" type.
  - "Handle inside scabbard": In this type, the handle almost sits inside the scabbard. It is faster and used to cut in one movement from unsheathing. This type of shashka was very light at 300–400 grams (0.66–0.88 pounds), flexible and strong. The best and most famous shashkas of these types were Gurda, Volchek (running wolf symbol on the blade).
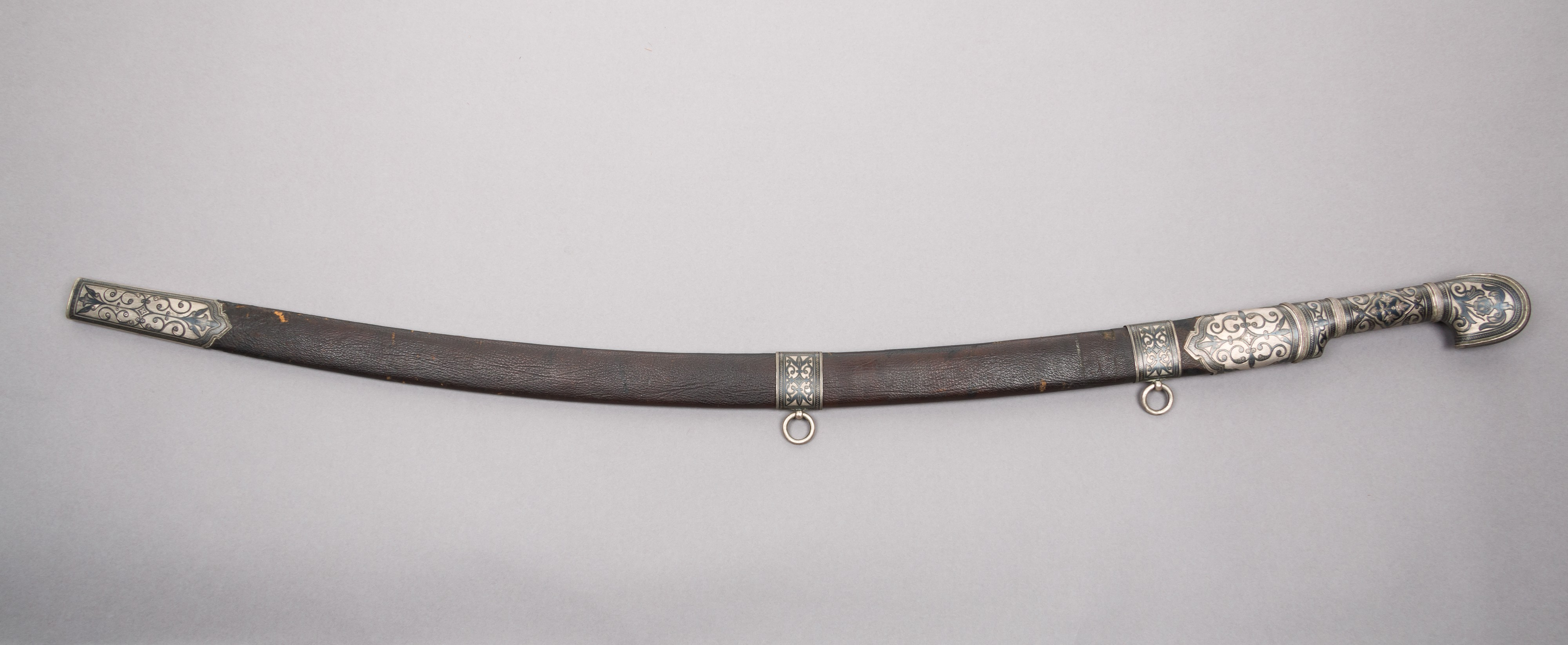
    Caucasian Shashka "handle fit to scabbard".
  - "Handle fit to scabbard": In this type, the handle is fitted to the scabbard and remains visible outside of it while sheathed. The scabbard and handle are typically thinner in this version.

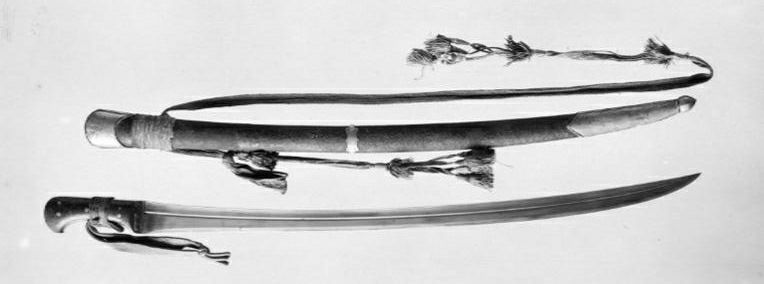
Central Asian (Bukharian) Shashka.

- Central Asian type (also known as Bukharian): They resemble the Caucasian type (it's unknown they came directly from Caucasus or through Russia or Asia) but with some distinction.

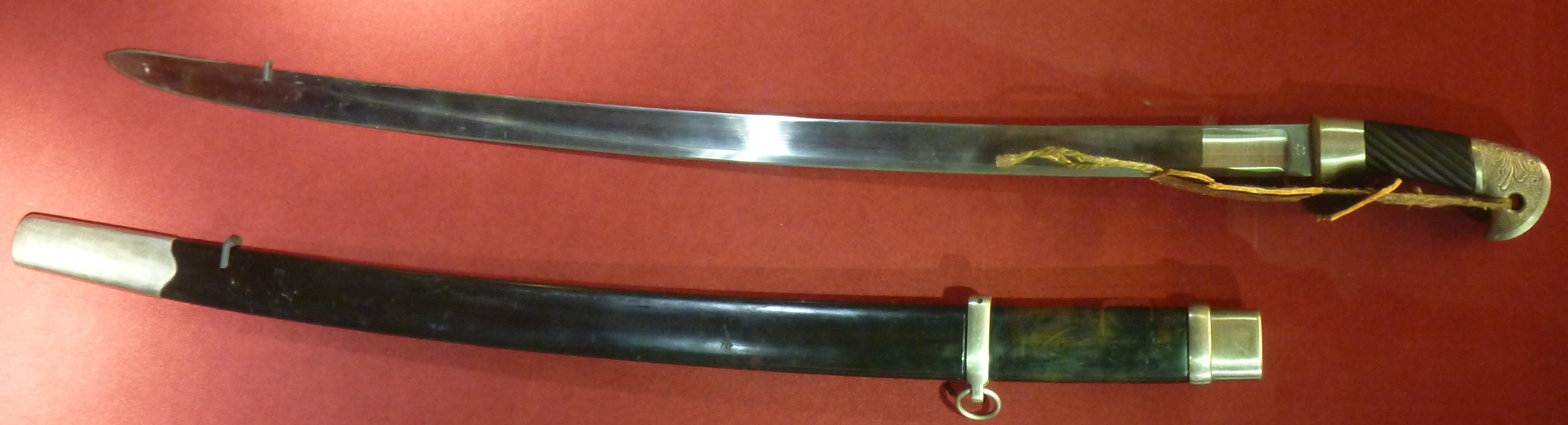
Cossack Type.

- Russian and cossack: During the Caucasian war and even before serving in the North Caucasus, Russian troops and cossacks adopted many elements of Native Caucasians culture and munition, including shashka. Later shashka was adopted by most cavalry troops of the Russian Imperial army. Since 1834 the Russian government tried to regulate cossacks’ weapons. In 1838 a principally new type of shashka was invented. There several types of cossack shashka: 1838 (cossack lower ranks, cossack officers), 1881 (cossack lower ranks, cossack officers), 1904 (cossack lower ranks), 1913 (cossack officers).

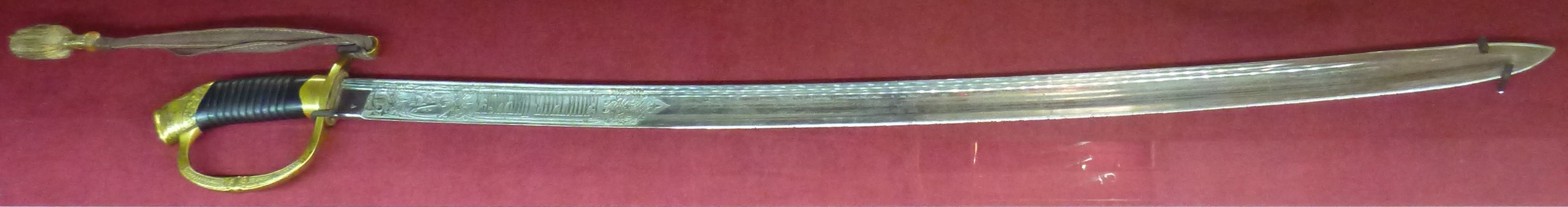
Dragoon Shashkas.

- Dragoon Shashkas: As it was already mentioned, since 1830s many Russian cavalry troops adopted shashka. In 1881 for dragoons a special model with brass knuckle bow was designed.

The first officially regulated Russian military shashka was the 1834 pattern, also called the "Nizhegorodka". This was followed by the 1838 pattern shashka. In 1881, two patterns were introduced: a 'Cossack' pattern, which was typical in not having a guard, and a 'dragoon' pattern, which was much more like a standard sabre in having a brass knuckle-bow, and was derived from the 1841 dragoon sabre. The blades of the two types were, however, essentially identical.

The Cossack hosts (not full-time regiments) used non-regulation shashkas until 1904, when they received their own regulation pattern.

The Soviet government introduced the 1927 pattern, which was very similar to the 1881 Cossack pattern; production of this pattern continued until 1946. The last pattern shashkas to be introduced were the 1940 patterns for "line commanding personnel" and generals—both had knuckle-bows.

== Construction ==
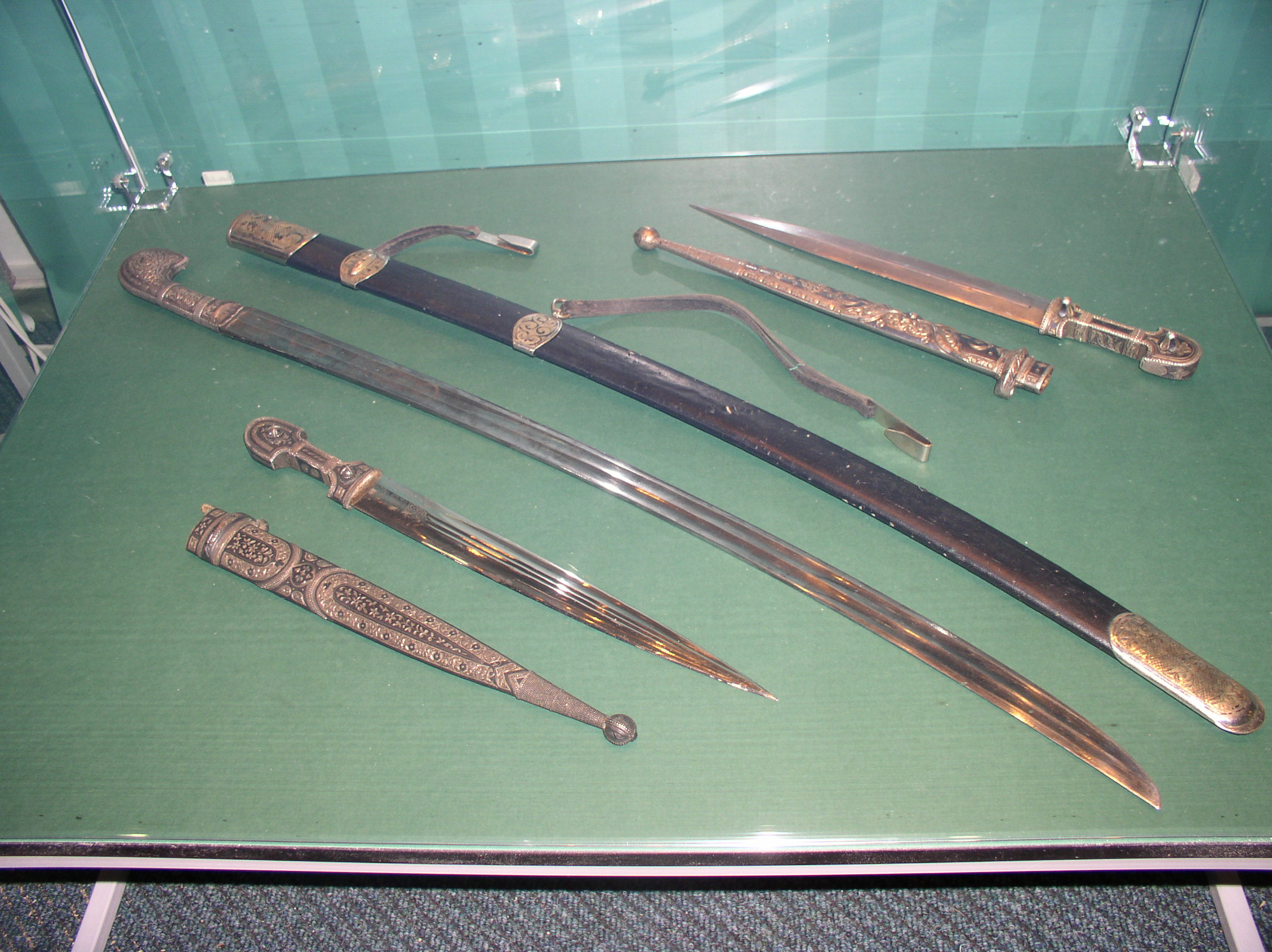
Sabres and daggers at the National Museum of History and Culture of Belarus, including a shashka.

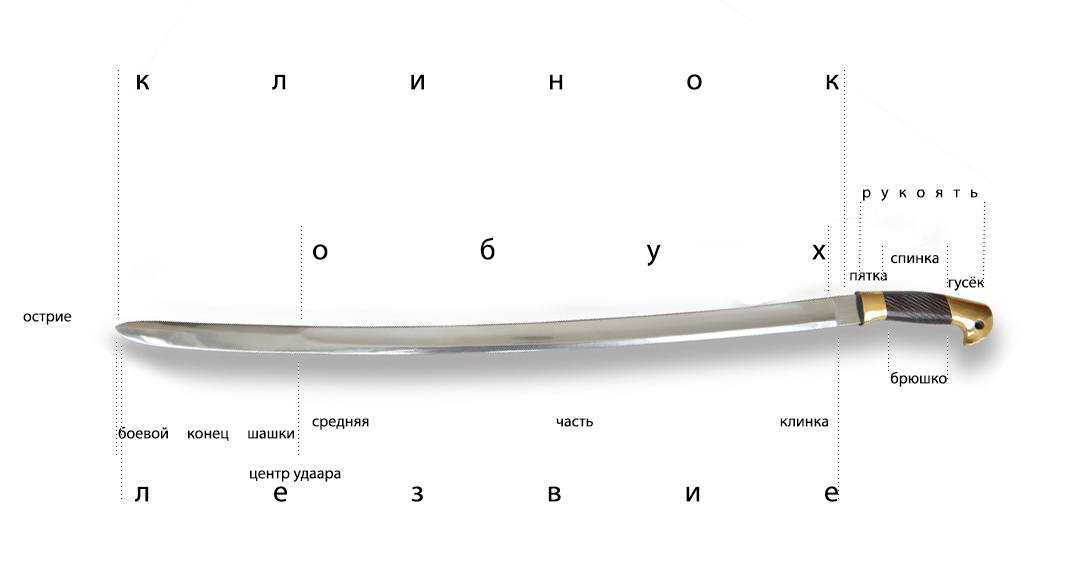
Reproduction of an 1881 pattern "Cossack" shashka

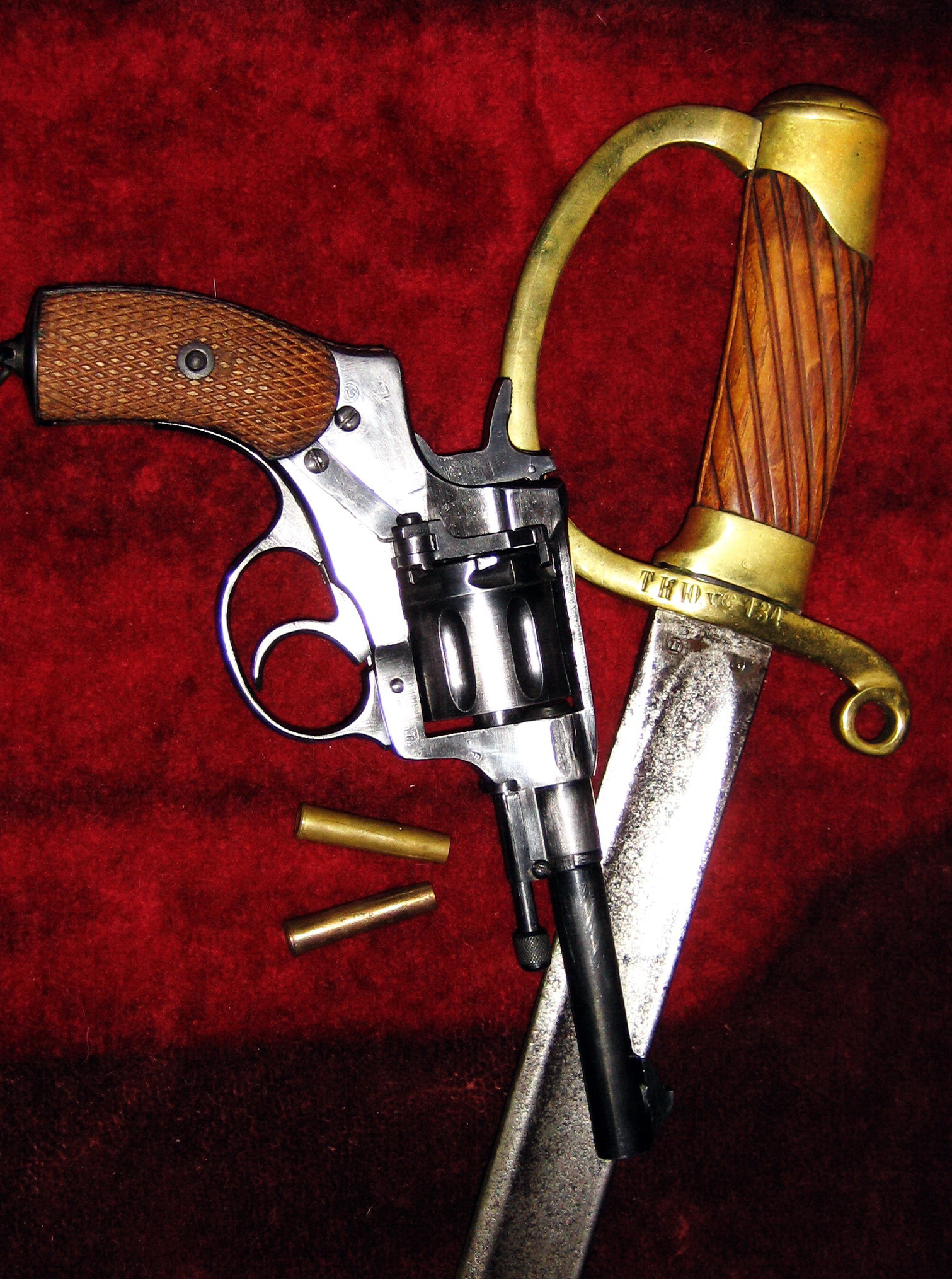
Hilt of an 1881 pattern "Dragoon" shashka (and revolver)

The shashka was a relatively short sabre, typically being 80 to 105 centimeters (31 to 41 inches) in total length. It had a slightly curved, fullered, blade with a single edge; the back of the blade was often sharpened for the 3rd of the blade nearest the tip (a false edge). The blade length was usually 65 to 86 centimeters (26 to 34 inches). The hilt had no guard (except for Russian Dragoon 'shashka' patterns, which had a brass knuckle-bow and quillon, and a conventional sabre pommel). The pommel was hook-shaped and divided into two 'ears'. This is a feature found in many weapons of the Western Asian highlands, from the Turkish yataghan to the Afghan pesh-kabz. The sword was worn in a scabbard suspended with the edge uppermost. The Caucasian form of the shashka had a scabbard which enclosed most of the hilt, with little more than the hooked pommel protruding.

Plainer, non-regulation shashkas often had hilts of horn, more highly decorated examples had hilts sheathed in niello-inlaid silver, with scabbard mounts to match. Russian military shashkas were much plainer, with hilts typically consisting of a brass ferrule, ribbed wooden grip and brass pommel. Unlike traditional non-regulation shashkas, the pommel of pattern shashkas was pierced to receive a sword-knot. The pommel was decorated with an imperial insignia; following the 1917 revolution, this was often ground off. Shashkas manufactured under the Soviet regime (Pattern 1927) had Communist symbols in place of the imperial ones. Later trooper models often had modified brass scabbard furniture to hold a bayonet for the Mosin–Nagant carbine. Officer's models, though of similar construction, did not have an attached bayonet, and were much more heavily decorated. In Tsarist times officers had considerable freedom in the decoration of their shaskas and some had non-regulation blades.

The 1834 pattern shashka was a popular weapon, when it was replaced by the 1881 pattern, several regiments complained so vociferously that their 1834s were returned to them.

The 1838 Pattern - typical statistics for a pattern sword:

Total length: 1,030 millimeters (41 inches)

Blade length: 875 millimeters (34.4 inches)

Blade width: 36 millimeters (1.4 inches)

Blade curvature: 62–375 millimeters (2.4–14.8 inches)

Point of balance: 170–180 millimeters (6.7–7.1 inches)

Weight: 1,067 grams (2.352 pounds)

== Use ==
Little or no surviving contemporary written information remains on how the people of the Caucasus used the shashka. However, surviving Russian military manuals indicate that, despite the lack of protection for the hand, the military shashka was used in much the same manner as a Western European sabre, with very similar cuts, thrusts, guards, and parries. In particular, Russian soldiers were not taught to cut in one movement from unsheathing, whatever Caucasus traditions suggest.

== See also ==
- Parikaoba/Farikaoba (ru:Парикаоба) – traditional Caucasian fencing with shashka and buckler
