= Pattern 1908 cavalry sword =

Type of cavalry sword

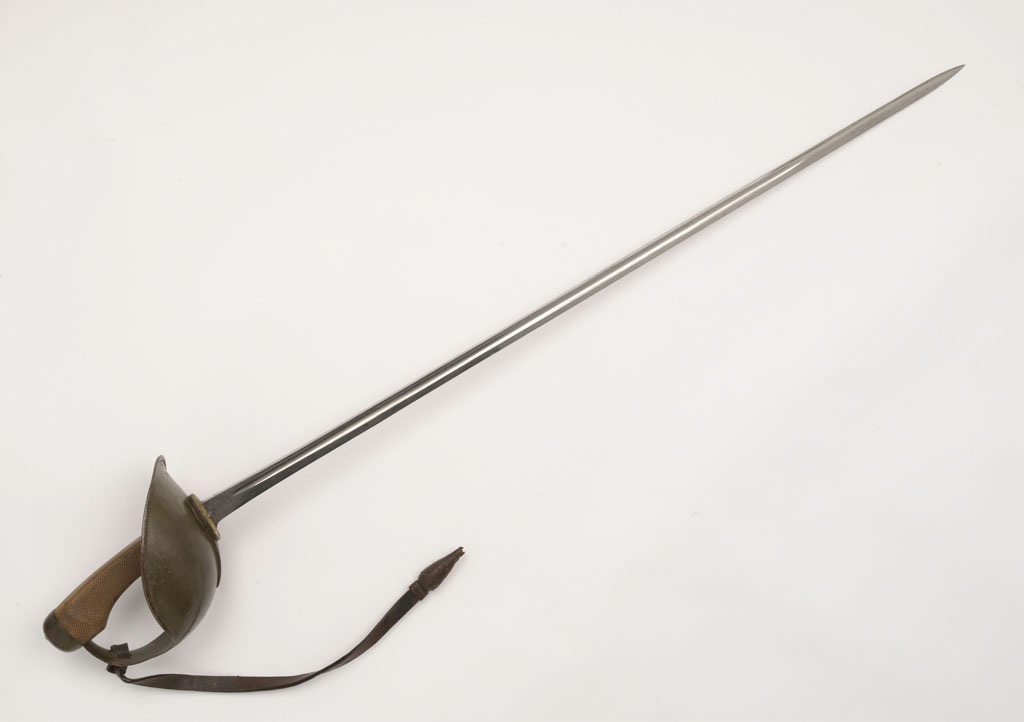
- Pattern 1908 cavalry sword
- Place of origin: United Kingdom

Service history
- In service: 1908–1918
- Used by: British Army; Australian Army; Canadian Army
- Wars: First World War

Production history
- Designer: Robert Mole & Sons
- Designed: 1903–1908
- Manufacturer: Robert Mole & Sons and Wilkinson Sword
- Produced: 1908–present
- Variants: Pattern 1912 cavalry officer’s sword

Specifications
- Length: 42 in (1,100 mm)
- Blade length: 34 3/4 in (880 mm)
- References: Imperial War Museum & Royal Armouries

The Pattern 1908 cavalry trooper's sword (and the 1912 Pattern, the equivalent for officers) was the last service sword issued to the cavalry of the British Army. It has been called the most effective cavalry sword ever designed, although its introduction occurred as swords finally became obsolete as military weapons. In use, it, like other thrust-based cavalry swords, is best described as a one-handed lance, due to its complete lack of utility for anything but the charge. In fact, the closely related US Model 1913 Cavalry Saber was issued with only a saddle scabbard, as it was not considered to be of much use to a dismounted cavalryman. Colonial troops, who could expect to engage in melee combat with opposing cavalry frequently carried cut and thrust swords either instead of, or in addition to, the P1908/1912.

In military circles, there had long been the debate over whether the use of the point or the edge was the better method of attack for a cavalryman. In the Napoleonic period, British cavalry doctrine as shaped by John Gaspard Le Marchant favoured the cut, resulting in the dramatically curved Pattern 1796 light cavalry sabre. With the introduction of the 1822 patterns, the British Army adopted a series of "cut and thrust" swords with slightly curved blades that were stiff enough for a thrust. The 1822 swords and their descendants were inevitably compromises, but the Army considered the adaptability to be of more importance. By contrast, the 1908 pattern was designed from the outset purely to give point (thrust) from horseback.

The sword has lived on as the ceremonial sword for the British, Canadian, and Australian cavalry units.

== Design of the 1908 pattern ==
With the introduction of the 1908 sword, however, the era of the compromise design was over. The 1908 sword was purely optimized for thrusting. The skewer-like blade had a thick "T" cross-section, much narrower but thicker than a traditional blade design making it far stiffer in the "weak" axis for a given weight so as to resist buckling in the thrust. The blade ended in a sharp "spear" point. The large, sheet steel bowl guard gave considerable protection to the hand. The rounded rectangular section chequered grip was of a semi-pistol configuration. Although not as extreme as modern fencing pistol or orthopedic grips, this design caused the blade to naturally align with the arm when the arm was extended, in position for a charge using the point. A thumb stop was indented on top of the grip, just behind the guard. The large pommel helped to keep the point of balance of the sword close to the guard, balancing the sword for its length.

The original official specification called, once again, for a "cut and thrust" blade and the final 18 inches (460 mm) of the blade was theoretically supposed to be sharpened, but little more than lip-service was paid to cutting ability. The straight blade prevented the slicing action of a curved sabre and the concussive force would be compromised by the hilt-biased balance. Furthermore, the narrow blade was weak in the cutting axis, and the pistol grip with specialised thumb placement, ideal for thrusting, was awkward for the cut.

The length of the blade at just over 35 inches (890 mm) was said to be able to match the reach of the lance (still in use with some armies at the turn of the 20th century) or the bayonet with the sword arm fully extended.

King Edward VII described the sword as "hideous" when the pattern was submitted to him for formal approval, and had to be persuaded of its utility before eventually conceding the point.

== 1912 Pattern cavalry officer's sword ==
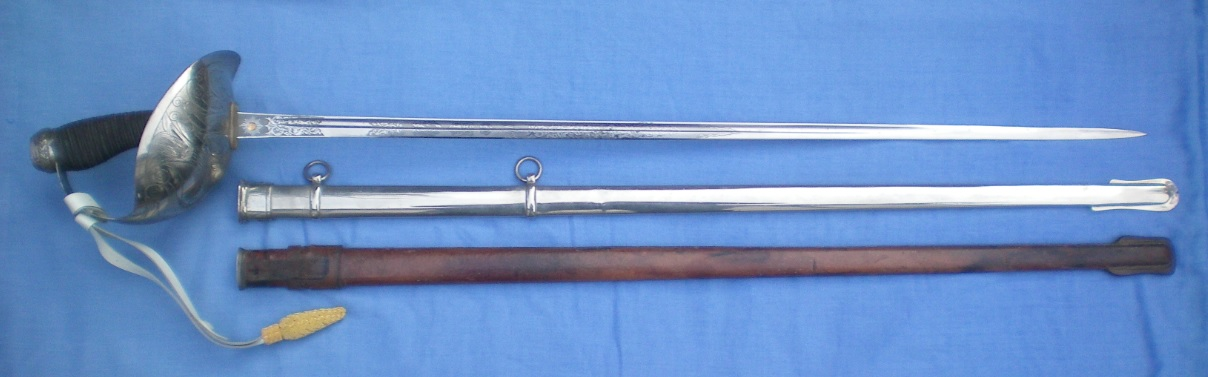
British Pattern 1912 cavalry officer's sword with dress and field service scabbards

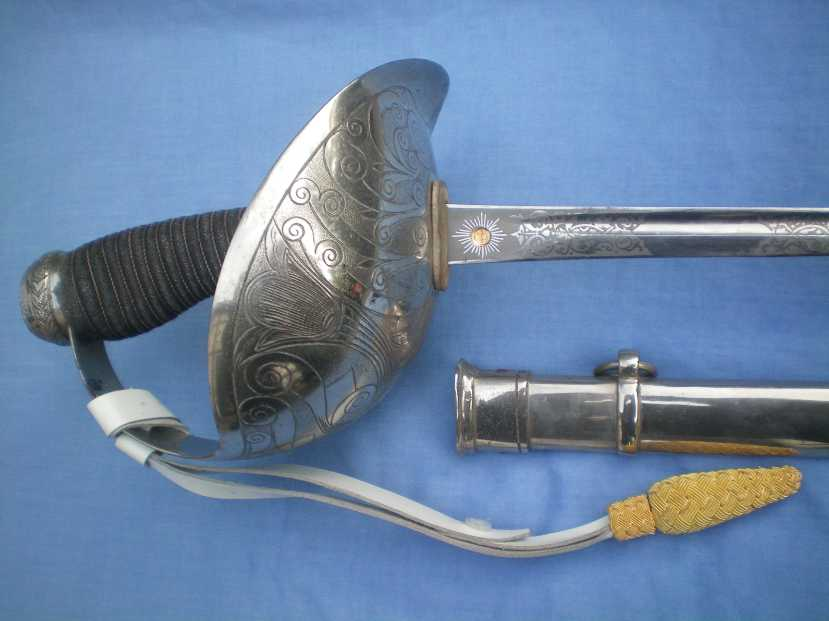
British Pattern 1912 officer's sword hilt

Whereas swords for troopers and NCOs were issued by the Army, officer's swords were privately purchased by the officers themselves. Until 1912, officers continued to carry their pierced "honeysuckle" hilted or three-bar hilted cut-and-thrust swords. The three-bar hilt was officially discontinued for light cavalry officers in 1896, in which year it was required that they adopt the heavy cavalry form. However army regulations also stated that on the introduction of a new pattern an officer's sword need not be replaced until his existing one was no longer serviceable; use of the three-bar hilt thus continued well into the 20th century.

In 1912 however, an officer's pattern was introduced which mirrored that carried by the men. The 1912 Pattern cavalry officer's sword is of the same basic form as the 1908 trooper's version, but in a more decorative form. The blade, plain for troopers, was usually engraved or etched (although during World War I expediency sometimes led to plain blades being fitted to officer's swords). The grip is of the same form, but the chequered rubber or bakelite grip was replaced by grey ribbed sharkskin, bound with German-silver wire. The pommel, plain on the trooper's version, was chequered and decorated.

On the front of the bowl guard, the 1912 sword had an engraved floral pattern, mimicking the honeysuckle pattern which had been common on officer's swords throughout the 19th century.

Officers' scabbards came in two forms: the dress scabbard was of nickel-plated steel, with two loose hanging rings affixed to the back edge, and the field service 'Sam Browne' form was of wood (other than the metal mouthpiece) and covered in leather.

== Variants ==
The Army of India variant of the 1908 sword featured a smaller grip to match the generally smaller hands of cavalry troopers recruited in the sub-continent.

As private purchases, officer's swords sometimes showed some variation from the standard pattern. Occasionally whole regiments would have their own variation on the theme. In particular, the fashion-conscious officers of the 10th Royal Hussars carried a bizarre version combining the pistol grip and blade of the 1912 pattern with a three-bar hilt from their earlier 1821 Pattern Light Cavalry sword, giving a unique but decidedly odd effect.

== Criticism ==
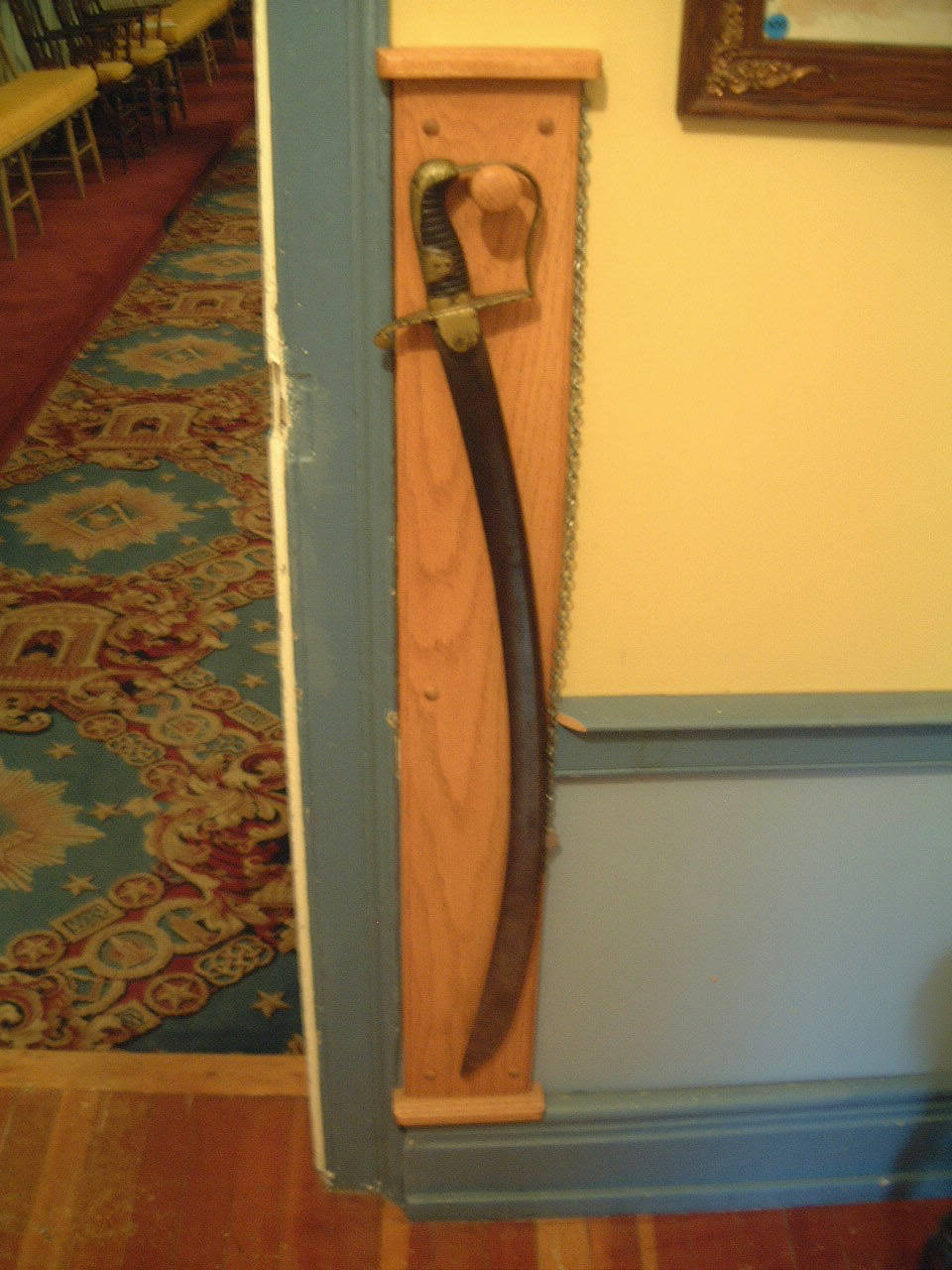
The 1796 Light cavalry sabre

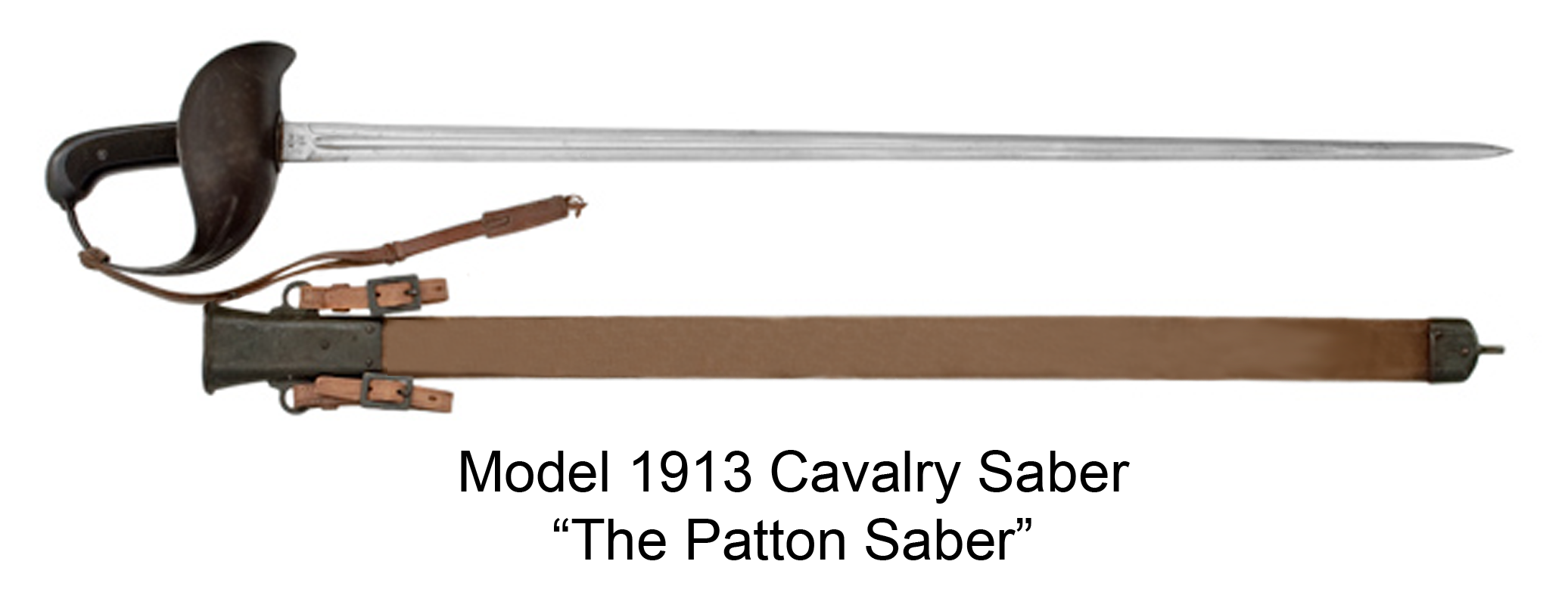
The 1913 Patton Sword

Although the 1908 and 1912 patterns can be seen as the penultimate expressions of the thrusting cavalry sword (the U.S. Army adopted its similar Patton saber in 1913), the debate over the relative virtues of the edge and the point remained. John Gaspard le Marchant, the great trainer and leader of British cavalry at the turn of the 19th century, felt that the weapon employed in the charge was almost irrelevant, as the shock value stemmed from the momentum of the combined horse and rider. The sword came into its own during the "desultory" encounters after the charge, for which a slashing sword was best suited. The British cavalry's last pure cutting sword, the spectacularly curved Pattern 1796 light cavalry sabre, was a design resulting from a collaboration between Le Marchant and Henry Osborn (a noted Birmingham-based sword manufacturer of the time).

The most compelling criticism of use of the point in cavalry combat, however, lies in the possibility of it becoming the victim of its own success. With the force of a fast-moving horse and rider behind it, a well-aimed sword thrust would certainly achieve considerable penetration, even up to the hilt. As the horse and rider passed the unfortunate recipient of the thrust, the sword would be very difficult to drag clear of the body, leaving the rider at best disarmed or at worst unhorsed or with a broken wrist.

== The Patton saber ==
The U.S. Army's Model 1913 cavalry saber had a large, basket-shaped hilt mounting a straight, double-edged, thrusting blade designed for use by heavy cavalry. Generally known as the "Patton" saber, after its designer Lieutenant (later General) George S. Patton, it may have been influenced by the British 1908 and 1912 Patterns.

== See also ==
- 1796 Heavy Cavalry Sword
- 1897 Pattern British Infantry Officer's Sword
- Gothic Hilted British Infantry Swords (1822, 1827, 1845, 1854 and 1892 Patterns)
- Pattern 1796 light cavalry sabre
- John Le Marchant (British Army cavalry officer)
