= Kastane =

Kastane sword
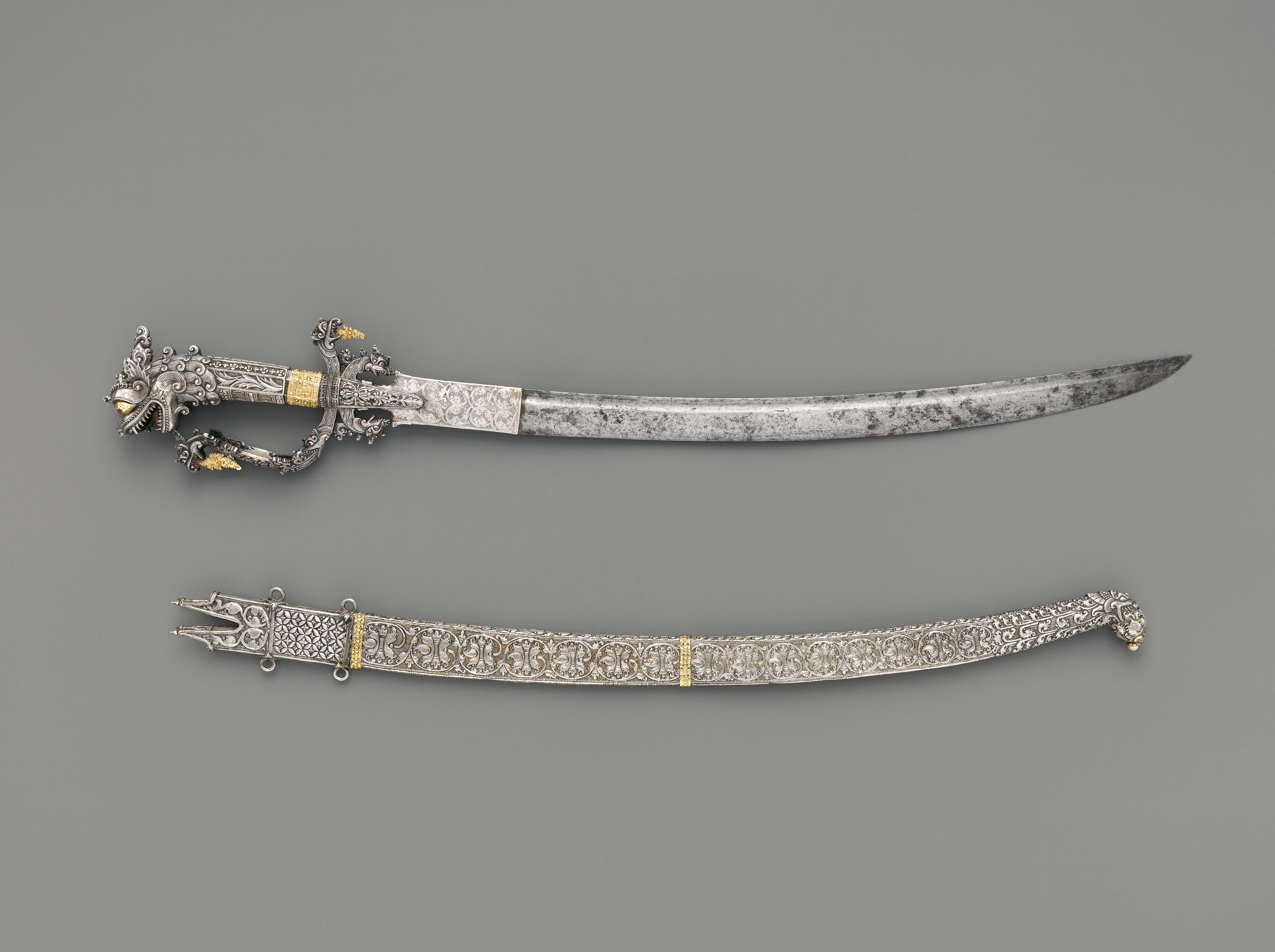
- An 18th-century Kasthane sword and scabbard
- Type: Ceremonial weapon
- Place of origin: Kingdom of Kandy

Service history
- Used by: Kingdom of Kandy; Sri Lanka Army

Specifications
- Blade type: Curved

A kastane or kasthane (Sinhala: කස්තානය) is a short traditional ceremonial or decorative single-edged Sri Lankan sword. The sword is featured in the Flag of Sri Lanka.

== Design ==
Kastanes often have elaborate hilts, especially shaped and described as having a rich mythical style inherited from Buddhism in blending a variety of icons including, Lions, Kirtimukha Serapendiya, Nagas, crocodile/human monsters and other dragon and gargoyle like effigies. Some appear seemingly emitted onto the hand guard and cross guard with Vajra style pseudo-quillons whose finials are also decorated by minor monsters and a rain-guard decorated by the Makara or Serapendiya peacock tail or fish scales which occasionally flows over and onto the blade at the throat. The scabbard is occasionally seen with a miniature beasts head at the chape also emitting an icon or cloud pattern. Sometimes a small human face decorates the hand-guard which is a half human/half crocodile monster.

The main aspect of Kastane Hilts shows the central monster accompanied by supporting minor iconic forms and the peculiar guard arrangement incorporating Buddhist style Vajra quillons. The National Museum of Colombo displays the oldest surviving makara-guard adorning a pre-kastane sword from the early Kotte kingdom. The cross and hand guards are further embellished with lavish decoration often spilling over onto the blades throat. In approaching a description authors should observe each Kastane separately since no two are identical and the main Hilt theme thus could be either of the variant Icons; Lion, Makara, Serapendiya or hybrid etc. and since artist and artisan may well have applied a broad ranging interpretation of the form.

== History ==
The Sendai City Museum displays the oldest surviving kastane 'Lion' hilt which belonged to daimyō Hasekura Tsunenaga dating from circa 1600 AD which had been purchased through Philippines, albeit on a hybrid blade. A depiction of the same blade with a different hilt in the hand of a Sinhala chief thought to be Kuruvita Rala or Rathnayake Mudiyanse, is displayed on a Portuguese stone slab near the Maha Saman devalaya, Ratnapura.

The oldest depiction of a kastane with a 'Makara' hilt dating from the same period is displayed at the Royal Armouries Museum on a painting of Colonel Alexander Popham, Commander of a Dragoon regiment in the English Civil War.

In 1807 it is recorded that the sword was an indicator of official rank so that the more senior persons in what could be described as a native headmen would wear a more lavishly adorned weapon and that this was also the intent though perhaps to a lesser degree in the Portuguese and Dutch periods. It is likely that this is a homegrown weapon though perhaps inspired by European swords brought by the Portuguese period in Ceylon or in fact imported by Muslim sea traders. The basic form being lavishly adorned so much so that it is almost impossible to designate a base pattern, though, North Italian or Venetian seems plausible. A 16th-century South Indian dagger hilt depicts what may be the basic hilt form. The blade comes in a variety of sizes and it can be either straight or slightly curved. They are usually single-edged though sharpened on both sides from the point back about 20 cm (8 in) and from the Dutch period are most frequently made in Europe(Solingen).The break in local blade production being the result of colonial presence and cheaper, imported foreign steel. None of the blades bear either Portuguese marks or English East India Company trademarks (EIC), however, there are many examples of Dutch influence with blades marked VOC usually with the Amsterdam initial 'A'. The single part of the sword that shares the similar characteristics is the hilt. It has two or four quillons. In the 4-quillon version the smaller two quillons are swept downwards toward the tip of the blade. In fact it is arguable if these are Quillons since they are mirror images of the Vajra projections on the Buddhist religious axe and perhaps serve no defensive purpose. The pommel and the quillons are very beautiful as each of them ends with a carved Iconic finial. The hilts are often encrusted with gemstones as in the eyes of Ruby stones and inlaid with silver or made entirely of silver or gold. The scabbards of the Kastane swords are made of wood or Rhino horn and are decorated with brass, silver and/or gold. It is a testament to the skill of the traditional craftsmen operating in Sri Lankas ancient Royal Sword Workshops.

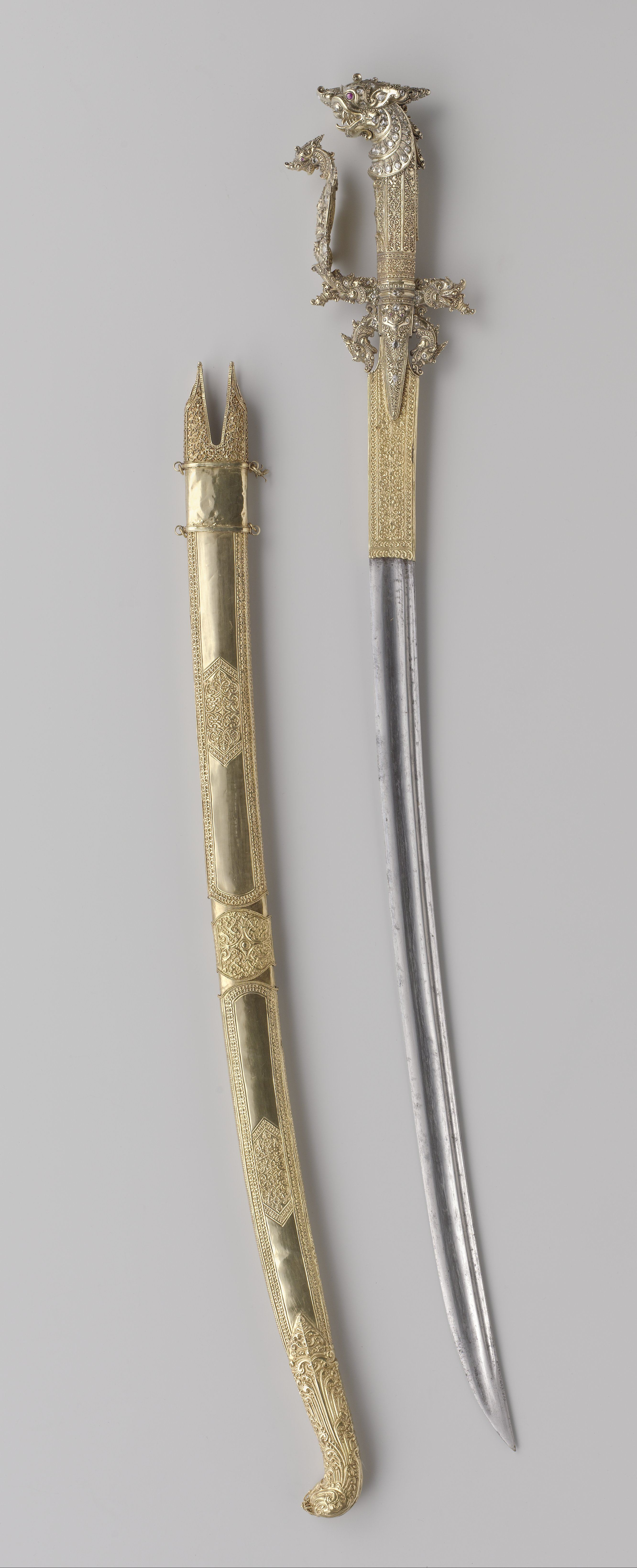

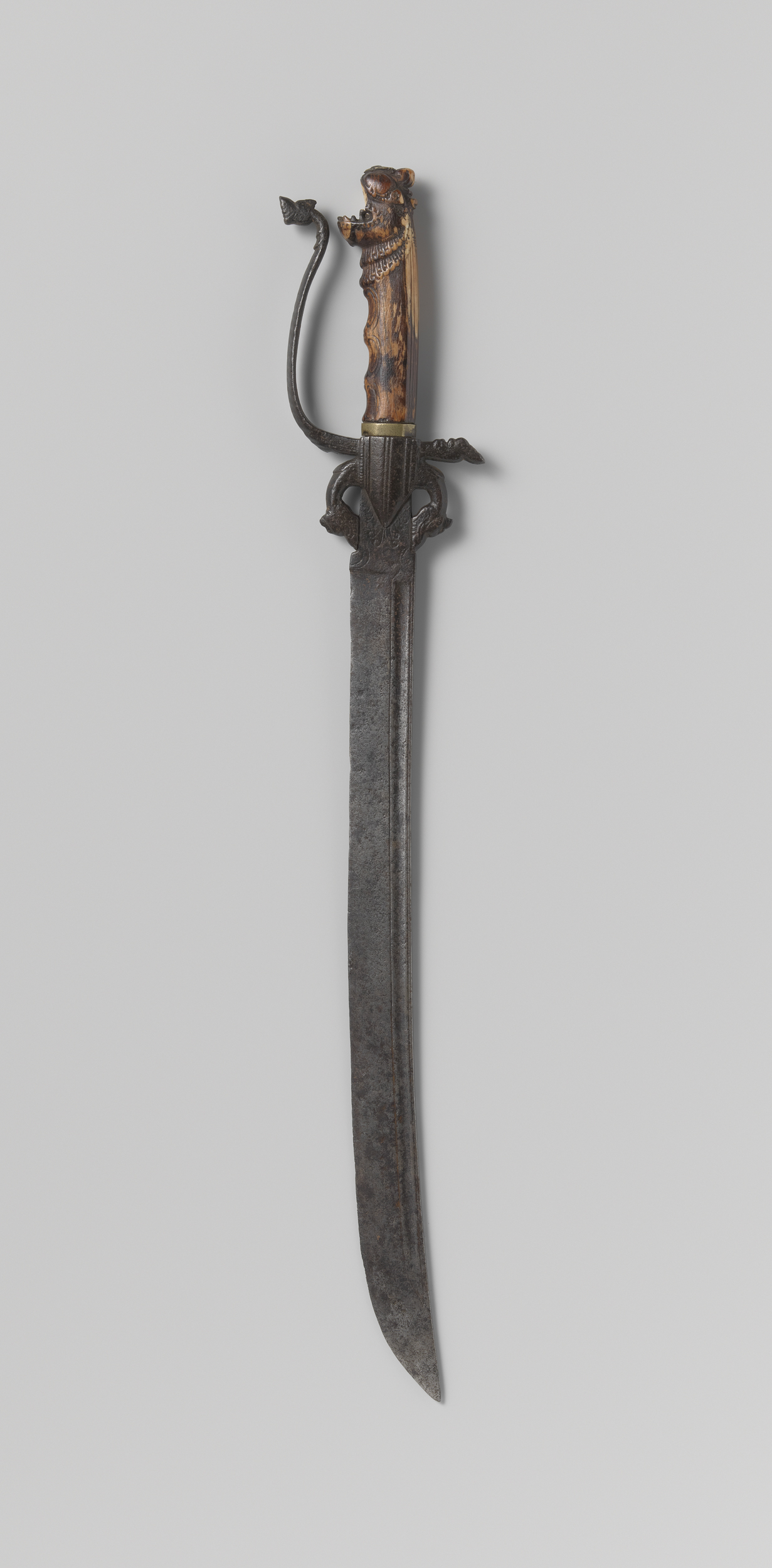

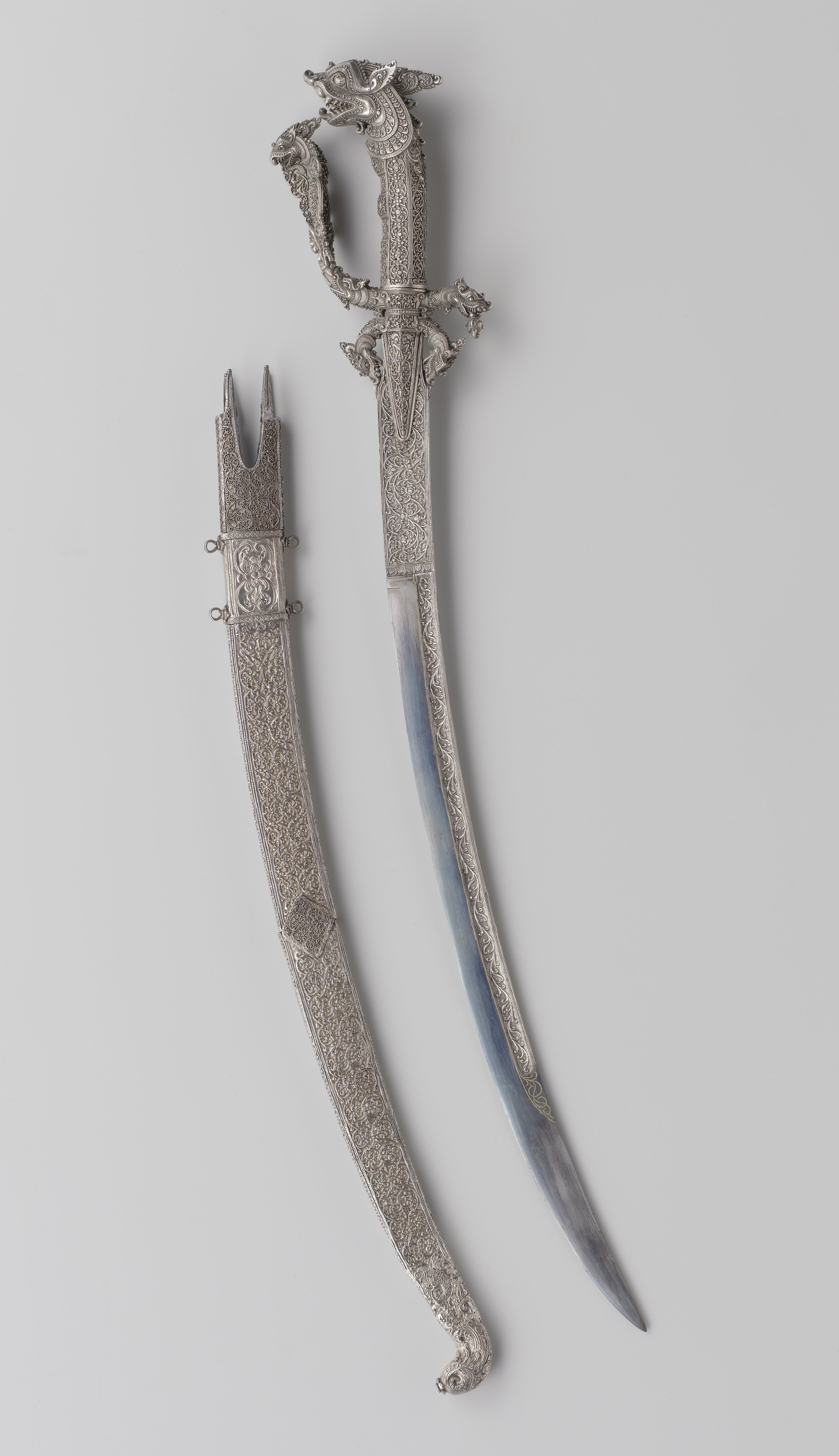

== Sri Lanka Army ==
The Sri Lanka Army replaced the British Army Pattern 1831 sabre for General Officers with the ceremonial pattern kastana sword for its general officers of the rank of Major General and above as well as the Aide-de-Camp to the President.
