= Model 1913 Cavalry Saber =

Cavalry sword designed for the US military

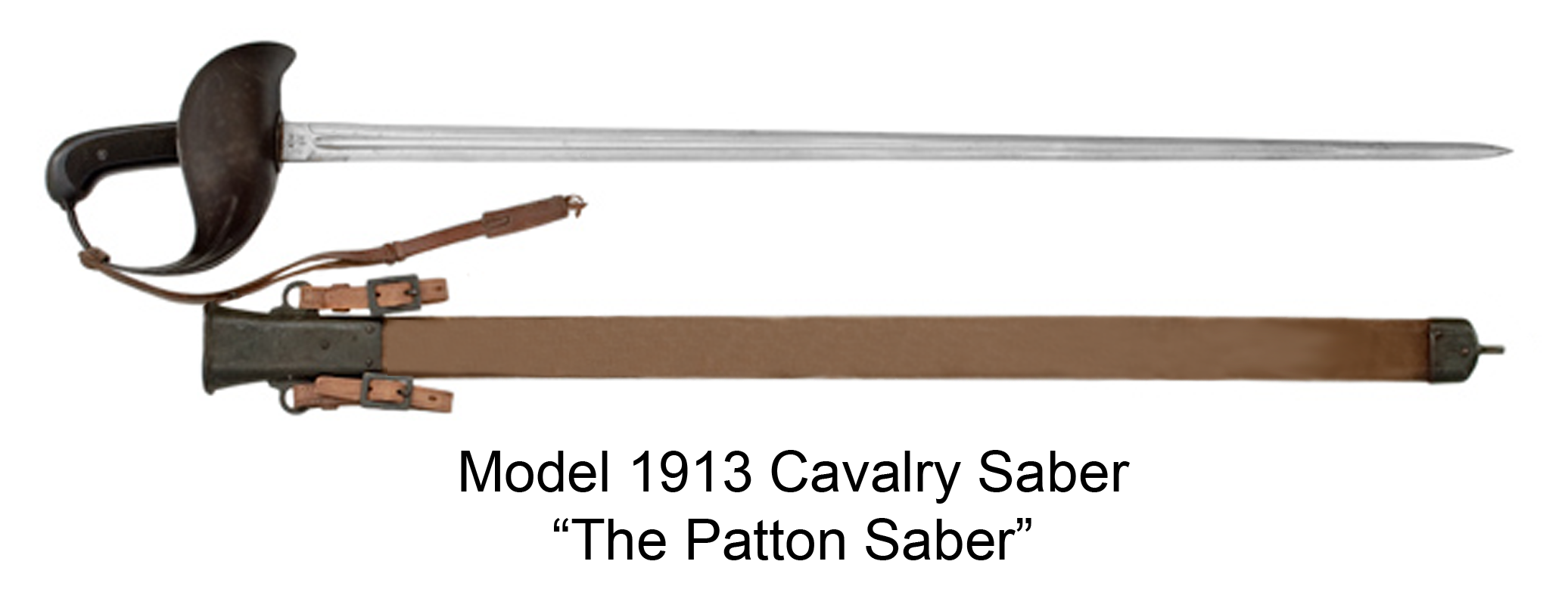
- The Model 1913 Cavalry Sword
- Type: Sabre
- Place of origin: United States

Service history
- Wars: World War I

Production history
- Designer: George S. Patton Jr.
- Designed: 1913
- Produced: 1913 (Springfield Armory) 1914 (Springfield Armory) 1915 (Springfield Armory) 1917 (Springfield Armory) 1918 (Springfield Armory, until June 30, after which production was continued by Landers, Frary & Clark of New Britain, Conn.) 1919 (Landers, Frary & Clark)

The Model 1913 Cavalry Sword, commonly referred to as the Patton Saber, was a cavalry sword designed for the U.S. Army by Second Lieutenant (later General) George S. Patton Jr. in 1913. Issued during World War I, the saber was the last sword to be used by the U.S. Cavalry.

== History ==
The saber is traditionally the weapon of the U.S. Cavalry; the 1913 Cavalry saber design replaced the Model 1906 Light Cavalry Saber ("Ames" saber), which itself was little changed from the Model 1860 Light Cavalry Saber.

Patton designed the saber when he was Master of the Sword at the Mounted Service School; unlike earlier revisions of cavalry sabers, however, the 1913 saber was a complete redesign.

Patton suggested the revision from a curved cutting sword to a straight thrusting sword style of attack, following his extensive training in France.

Following the 1912 Olympics in Stockholm, Patton traveled with his family to Dresden, Berlin, and Nuremberg. Seeking the greatest swordsman in Europe to study with, Patton was told the "beau sabreur" of the French Army would be the one. Adjutant M. Cléry was a French "master of arms" and instructor of fencing at the Cavalry School at Saumur.

Patton went to Saumur to undergo an intense study with the master. Upon his return, Patton wrote a report on his sword studies that was revised for the Army and Navy Journal. Patton's first article for the well-known Cavalry Journal appeared in the March 1913 issue.

In the summer of 1913, following his advising the Ordnance Department on sword redesign, Patton was allowed to return to Saumur to study once again under Cléry. Patton was next assigned to the Mounted Service School at Fort Riley, Kansas, as a student and "Master of the Sword", the top instructor in a new course in swordsmanship.

It was here he wrote two training manuals in mounted and unmounted swordsmanship, "Saber Exercise 1914", and "Diary of the Instructor in Swordsmanship". Patton's original saber is on display at the General George Patton Museum at Fort Knox, Kentucky.

== Design ==
The design was influenced by the French heavy cavalry sword of the Napoleonic Wars, as well as French cavalry doctrine that emphasized the use of the point over the edge and is similar to the French Mle 1896 straight saber (and the previous Mle 1882), with which French cavalry entered the World War I, and the British Pattern 1908 and 1912 cavalry swords.

The Model 1913 saber features a large, basket-shaped hilt mounting a straight, double-edged, thrusting blade designed for use by heavy cavalry. It was designed in accordance with Patton's system of swordsmanship, which was published by the War Department as the 1914 Saber Exercise manual, and which emphasized the use of the point over the edge.

A modern reproduction is 44 inches (110 cm) overall with a 35 in (89 cm) blade and weighs two and a half pounds (1.1 kg). The blade is straight and tapered, the front edge running the whole length of the blade and double-edged for half its length. Considering the weight of the bell and grip assembly, it would be balanced much closer to the hand than the typical weapon associated with the name "cavalry saber".

- It has a blued steel (some were nickel-plated) "cup-hilt" and a black composition grip.
- The scabbards (three variants) are of wood covered by leather, then covered with green canvas. The furniture (throat and drag) are of blued steel. Others were nickel plated steel—"garrison scabbards".
- It was worn attached to the saddle of the horse, rather than being attached to the waist of the trooper.

== Adoption ==
Patton's 1914 manual "Saber Exercise 1914" outlined a system of training for both mounted and on-foot use of the saber.

Patton's thoughts were expressed in his 1913 report "The Form and Use of the Saber". He expanded on his "Saber Exercise 1914" manual the next year, at the request of his students at the Mounted Service School in Fort Riley, Kansas, with the publication of "Diary of the Instructor in Swordsmanship":

In the Peninsula War the English nearly always used the sword for cutting. The French dragoons, on the contrary, used only the point which, with their long straight swords, almost always caused a fatal wound. This made the English protest that the French did not fight fair. Marshal Saxe wished to arm the French cavalry with a blade of a triangular cross section so as to make the use of the point obligatory. At Wagram, when the cavalry of the guard passed in review before a charge, Napoleon called to them, "Don't cut! The point! The point!"

This weapon, the last sword issued to U.S. cavalry, was never used as intended, and was already militarily obsolete. After American entry into World War I, several cavalry units armed with sabers were sent to the front. However, they were held back as the character of war had changed; mounted troops were useful in only limited circumstances and easy prey for enemy troops equipped with Gewehr 98 rifles, Maschinengewehr 08 machine guns, and artillery. Cavalrymen who saw combat did so dismounted, using their horses only to travel in a manner similar to mounted infantry.

In April 1934, the Assistant Adjutant General of the Army, Brigadier General Edgar Thomas Conley, on behalf of the Adjutant General James Fuller McKinley, ordered that sabers be discontinued as an item of issue to the cavalry, and that they be "completely discarded" as cavalry weapons. Their use except as ceremonial items by officers was to end at once, they were to be stored pending further instructions, and all references to them were to be removed from future tables of organization and equipment of cavalry units.
