= Gothic hilted British infantry swords =

Style of sword of the British Army

The Gothic hilted swords are a family of swords carried by officers and some NCOs of the British Army between 1822 and the present day. They are primarily infantry swords, although they were also regulation pattern for some other officers such as surgeons and staff officers. The term "Gothic hilt" is derived from a perceived similarity between the curved bars of the guard and the arches found in Gothic architecture. They are elegant aesthetically pleasing weapons, although considered by some to be mediocre fighting swords. The weapon and its variants had a very long service life.

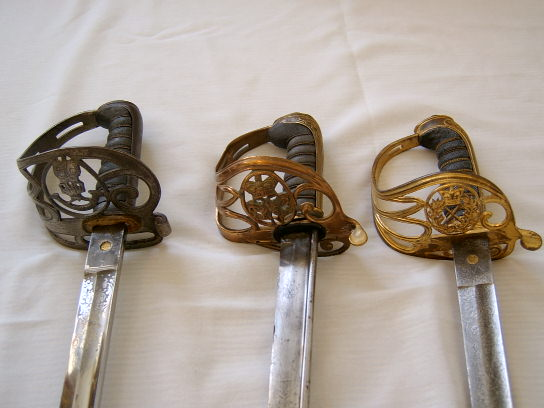
Three Gothic hilts

They were replaced ultimately by the 1897 pattern British infantry officer's sword, first having the 1822 pipe-back blade replaced by the 1845 fullered blade, then the 1845-type blade replaced by a new thrusting blade in 1892 and then receiving a new steel hilt in 1895, which was then updated slightly in 1897.

== Private purchase ==
Although infantry sergeants' and cavalry troopers' swords were issued by the army, officers were expected to purchase their own equipment. In theory they were required to purchase a sword which conformed to an official pattern, however some regiments had their own peculiarities and some allowed their officers some leeway in specification, so there are variations between individual pieces. Also, minor differences between individual manufacturers' examples exist, partly due to their own unique interpretations of the specification for the weapon. Lastly, officers could in fact purchase a blade of their own choosing if they cared to, so long as it looked more or less regulation when worn in the scabbard. Therefore, the precise length, curvature and width of blades varies between examples, with a small number of officers choosing entirely different types of non-regulation blade. Companies like Wilkinson of Pall Mall sold officers' swords in a variety of lengths, curves, widths and styles, while all conforming more or less to the basic regulations for each branch of the service.

== 1822 pattern infantry officer’s sword ==
The 1822 dress regulations mandated the introduction of a new sword, to replace the 1803 flank officer's sabre and the spadroon-bladed 1796 line infantry officer's sword.

The sword featured a 32.5-inch-long (830 mm), slightly curved blade of what was known as the 'pipe-back' design, a cross-section sometimes referred to as 'key-hole' shape in Victorian sources. This consisted of a flat, un-fullered, single edged blade with a nearly straight rod running along the back of the blade, with a 'false-edge' being formed on the back edge near to the tip, sometimes described as a 'quill-point'. This style of blade seems to have been the innovation of the maker Prosser of Charing Cross, London, and first appeared on 1796 light cavalry style blades from around 1810–1815. This cross-section was then translated to the new narrower 1822 infantry officers' sword. The 1822 blades generally featured acid etched decoration showing the monarch's monogram and other devices. The pipe-backed blade is very light for its size and has a very fine edge.

The gilded brass, 'half-basket' hilt featured the characteristic Gothic outline, with the monarch's monogram formed in the guard. The hilt had an ornate one piece pommel and 'backstrap' enclosing the end and back of the grip, held in place by a ribbed brass ring at the top of the grip and a tang nut or peened rivet at the end of the pommel. The inside section of the guard folded on a hinge towards the blade, to allow the sword to rest easily against the wearer's side when worn. The wooden grip was covered in shark skin, known as shagreen, to give a textured surface for a secure grip, and this was wrapped with brass, copper or silver twist-wire in the recesses of the ribbed grip.

Although the pipe/rod reinforcing at the back edge of the blade was intended to add rigidity for the thrust and strength/mass for the cut, the blade was rather flexible and light at the centre of percussion when made in the infantry sword size. The half basket guard gave better protection to the hand than its predecessor, the 1796 pattern, however the brass could be fragile on some examples, as illustrated by many surviving examples having damage or repairs. Later in the 19th century, it was noted in many articles on British military swords (including the lecture of John Latham of Wilkinson swordmakers in 1862) that these brass guards were vulnerable to hard blows from strong cutting swords such as Indian tulwars.

== 1845 pattern infantry officer’s sword ==
In 1845, the pipe backed blade was replaced by Henry Wilkinson's design. This was a slightly curved cut-and-thrust blade, generally of the same length of the previous pattern, however the new blade featured a single, wide fuller and a flat back, rather than the pipe back, with a symmetrical spear-point rather than the quill-point. In essence it was a curved backsword blade with an improved point. It was a slightly heavier and more robust blade than the 1822 pipe-back. This new blade was also carried over onto cavalry, engineers and artillery officer's swords in 1845 and to naval officer's swords in 1846.

The hilt remained essentially unchanged from the 1822 pattern, although there was a tendency for brass guards after 1845 to be made somewhat thicker and more robust than previously. The hinged guard flap, which had been standard (if not universal) from 1822, started to disappear in the 1850s, to be replaced by a solid brass guard almost universally after around 1860. This change to the hilt is sometimes referred to as the '1854 pattern', but it was not technically a 'pattern' and the change seems to have happened at the end of the 1850s generally. Therefore, there is no actual '1854 pattern' other than the Foot Guards sword (details below). Wilkinson were still making infantry officers' swords with folding inner guards until 1859 as standard and do not seem to have switched to universally solid guards until 1860. The 1845 blade remained the same.

Direct comparison of the 1822 and 1845 blades shows that the new weapon was an improvement, being stiffer in bending and compression. It had a more robust edge, was a little heavier, had more mass in the centre of percussion and the symmetrical spear-point is much better at penetrating. The blade is better therefore at cutting, thrusting and guarding. Contemporary views on the new blade were favourable and it was almost universally adopted within a year. It was also adopted and embraced by experienced combat officers ordering fighting swords who could have chosen any type of private purchase blade (for example Major Hodson and Brigadier-General Jacob both chose this blade type for their custom fighting swords, which survive in the National Army Museum and Royal Armouries respectively) and it was emulated by various foreign militaries. Original sharp examples and replicas perform well in cutting tests, easily equalling other backsword and sabre types.

During the period of the 1845 blades use on infantry officers' swords, from 1845 to 1892, it has been observed that blades tended to get straighter. This is a general tendency, but was not universal. One can find early examples with straighter blades and later examples with more curved blades. The curvature varied, though it is fair to say that more straight examples seem to appear from later dates. The width of the blades were usually 1 1/8 inches (29 mm), but some examples were only 1 inch (25 mm) wide, and again these narrower ones tend to be later in date. Again this is a general tendency and not a rule. 'Piquet' or dress weight examples were made with much narrower blades and correspondingly smaller hilts. The standard length of these blades was 32.5 inches (830 mm), but again there was variation, with officers basically being allowed to order whatever length best suited them. Most surviving examples are 32.5 to 34.5 inches (830 to 880 mm). Thickness or mass of blades also varied and different examples can feel quite diverse in the hand. Some are balance to be better cutters while others make better thrusting swords.

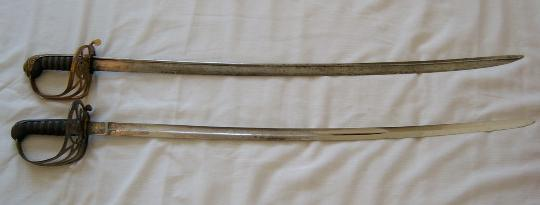
Comparison of the 1822 "pipe-backed" and 1845 "fullered" blades

== 1892 pattern infantry officer's sword ==
The 1845 sword enjoyed a long service life and was used successfully in colonial wars all over the world, often winning the praise of British soldiers who used it to defend their lives. However, in 1892 proponents of the theory that thrust should be used exclusively over cutting for swords prevailed and the cut and thrust blade was replaced by a straight dedicated thrusting blade with a thick, fullered, dumbbell section and a very acute narrow tapered point. Unburdened by the design compromises of a requirement to cut well, this was a triumph of academic theory over real world experience, but was generally well received (Robson reports on its good performance against the Dervishes in the Sudan. It was during the Sudan campaign when a young Winston Churchill sheathed his (cavalry) sword before the charge and used his then modern Mauser Broomhandle semiautomatic pistol). The 1892 blade is difficult to compare to the 1845 blade using historical accounts, because after 1892 there were comparatively far fewer encounters where swords were actually used.

In 1895, the brass Gothic hilt was replaced by a steel hilt for line infantry officers, featuring a totally new design of both the guard and the handle. This was married to the 1892 thrusting blade to create an entirely new sword. Accompanying this was a new Sword Exercise system of 1895, promoted by Colonel Fox of the Army Gymnasia and devised by Maestro Masiello of Florence.

== Steel gothic-hilted swords ==
In 1827, officers of the rifle regiments (considered somewhat of an elite), and later in 1854 the regiments of the Foot Guards, were authorised to carry their own variation of the hilt. The blade remained that of the 1822 pattern sword (changing, along with the line infantry, to a fullered blade in 1845). The hilt was of the Gothic pattern but in steel with the crown and stringed bugle motif (light infantry) or the regimental capbadge (guards) replacing the royal cypher. The steel guards were often less well rendered than that of the brass hilts and there was no folding flap.

The hilt pattern is still current for The Rifles, Royal Gurkha Rifles and Foot Guards regiments although with the 1892 thrusting blade rather than the 1845 sabre blade. The Cameronians also used a variation on the design with the regimental badge in place of the strung bugle.

== Variations ==
Sergeants' swords were similar to those for officers, but generally had undecorated blades with a shorter ricasso. Some sergeants' swords featured a quill-point rather than the spear-point found on officers' swords. Many sergeants' swords were made by Mole of Birmingham and some by Thurkle of London. Some sergeants' swords feature a brass grip instead of the usual shark skin grip.

The Royal Welch Fusiliers were entitled to carry a variation on the 1822 sword wherein the cypher of the monarch on the guard was replaced with the feathers of the Prince of Wales. This seems to have been an entirely optional affectation for officers of the regiment, as examples without this difference exist.

The East India Company used a variant of the 1822 and 1845 sword with the lion rampant holding a crown replacing the cypher of the monarch on the guard.

Staff officers throughout most of the period carried a brass hilted sword like the normal line infantry officers' sword, but with the crossed baton staff symbol in place of the royal cipher. Generals carried the same sword as their staff, until they were formally replaced by a Mameluke style sword in 1831.

Some infantry officers who would have generally carried the brass-hilted sword elected to have a hilt made of steel, which was then gilded to look like the normal brass hilt. This of course made for a much stronger guard and this feature is often found among swords ordered by British officers with experience of Indian service.

Lastly, as noted above, officers were given considerable freedom in choosing the exact details of the blades being mounted in regulation style hilts, so long as their swords looked approximately regulation when worn.
