= Pattern 1897 infantry officer's sword =

1897 Pattern Sword
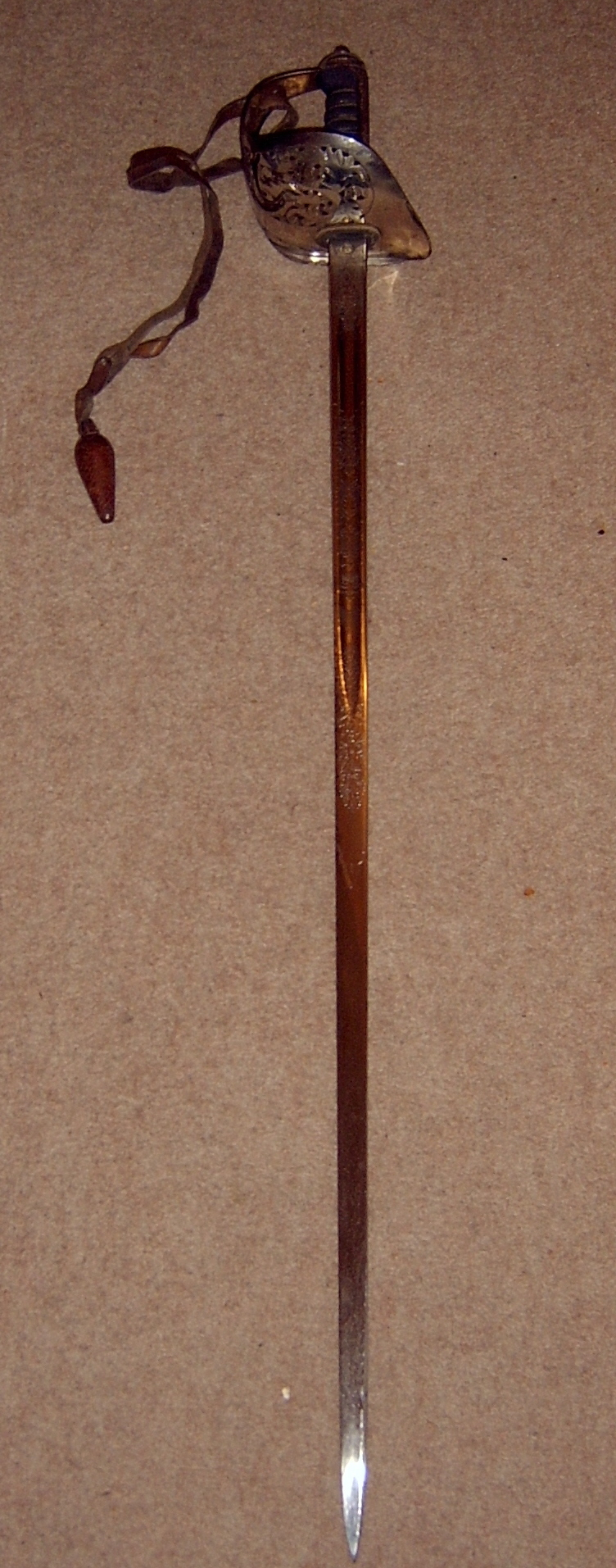
- 1897 Pattern Sword
- Place of origin: United Kingdom

Service history
- In service: 1897–present
- Used by: British Commonwealth

Production history
- Designed: 1897
- Manufacturer: Various; predominantly Wilkinson, currently made by Weyersberg, Kirschbaum & Co., Germany
- Produced: 1897–present day
- Variants: Light (picquet) weight, ceremonial version

Specifications
- Mass: 1 lb 12 oz – 1 lb 13 oz (790–820 g)
- Length: 32 1/2 in (830 mm)
- Width: 1 in (25 mm)
- Blade type: Steel, pointed, partially two-edged.
- Hilt type: Basket hilt

The 1897 pattern infantry officers' sword is a straight-bladed, three-quarter basket-hilted sword that has been the regulation sword for officers of the line infantry of the British Army from 1897 to the present day.

== History ==
The curved, Gothic-hilted 1822 and 1845 pattern infantry swords, although elegant, had been criticised by some as fighting swords. In common with British cavalry swords of the era, they were cut-and-thrust swords.

In 1892, a new, straight, blade was introduced, mated to the existing Gothic hilt. Presaging the introduction of the 1908 pattern cavalry sword, the curved blade was abandoned in favour of a straight, stiff blade optimised for the thrust. Credit for the design has been given to Colonel G. M. Fox, Inspector of Gymnasia at Aldershot, who was also influential in the design of the pattern 1908 cavalry sword.

In 1895, a new pierced steel hilt pattern was introduced, replacing the earlier Gothic hilt with a three-quarter basket hilt. The new pattern was short-lived due to the edge of the guard fraying uniforms, and in 1897 the final pattern was settled on, being simply the 1895 pattern with the inner edge of the guard turned down, and the piercings becoming smaller.

By the time of its introduction, the sword was of limited use on the battlefield against rapid-firing rifles, machine guns and long-range artillery. However, the new sword was regarded, when needed, as a very effective fighting weapon. Reports from the Sudan, where it was used in close-quarters fighting during the reconquest of the Sudan (1896–1899) were positive. Officers carried swords into battle in 1914 at the start of the First World War, and some were still being used in action at the Battle of Neuve Chapelle in March 1915. That June, Army Order 68 prohibited the carrying of swords by infantry on the battlefields of the European theatre of the war, in an effort to prevent officers making themselves conspicuous to the enemy; however, at least one sword was carried in the assault on the first day of the Battle of the Somme in June 1916. Bernard Montgomery advanced with his 1897 pattern sword drawn during a counteroffensive in October 1914; having never received any training on how to use it. The actual sword he carried is exhibited in the Imperial War Museum, London.

The design of the 1897 pattern has remained unchanged to the present day, and is now manufactured by various companies, including Weyersberg, Kirschbaum & Cie of Germany and Pooley Sword of the UK. Until 2004, swords of this pattern would be used in courts-martial by escorts of the accused and if the accused was an officer, he would lay his sword on the table for judgement.

== Design ==
The blade is described in the pattern as being 32 1/2 inches (830 mm) long and 1 inch (25 mm) wide at the shoulder, with the complete sword weighing between 1 pound 12 ounces (0.79 kg) and 1 pound 13 ounces (0.82 kg).

The blade is straight and appears symmetrical in shape (though in cross-section is a wedge, with the edge towards the front). The thick blade has a deep central fuller on each side and is rounded on both its edge and back towards the hilt, giving a “dumbbell” or “girder” cross section. Through a gradual transition, the blade becomes a wedge-section with the main cutting edge towards the front. The last 13 inches (330 mm) of the front edge was sharpened when on active service (and a few inches of the false edge, at the back near the tip, to aid penetration). The blade ends in a sharp stiff spear point.

The blade is usually decoratively etched on both sides.

The guard is a three-quarter basket of sheet steel. It is decorated with a pierced scroll-work pattern and (usually, see variation, below) has the royal cypher of the reigning monarch set over the lower knuckle bow.

The grip, between 5 and 5 3/4 inches (130–150 mm) long to suit the hand of the owner, is generally covered in ray or sharkskin and wrapped with German-silver wire. The grip is straight, with no offset to the blade.

The sword shows a number of features that indicate its intent as a thrusting weapon. The stiff tapering narrow point aids penetration. The blade, whilst quite narrow, is thick and its dumbbell section gives it good weak-axis buckling strength whilst maintaining robustness in bending for the parry. The blade tapers in both width and thickness and, with the substantial guard, has a hilt-biased balance, aiding agility at the expense of concussive force in a cut. The guard gives comprehensive protection to the hand, but does not restrict wrist movement. The length of the front edge, at 17 inches (430 mm), is quite significant, suggesting that some cutting capability was maintained, even if the blade design is clearly intended as a thruster.

== Variations ==
In common with earlier patterns, the 1897 pattern was sometime produced in "picquet" weight, i.e., a lighter weapon with a narrower blade and correspondingly scaled-down guard for use in levées and other formal occasions when not on active service.

Some regiments carried variations on the standard pattern, generally consisting of variations of the royal cypher on the guard.

An unetched blade variant is available for warrant officers.

The sword pattern also influenced the ceremonial sword used by the Hong Kong Police Force's Ceremonial uniform as well as the 1897 Canadian Infantry Sword used by the Canadian Army.
