= Swords in courts-martial =

Former British military tradition

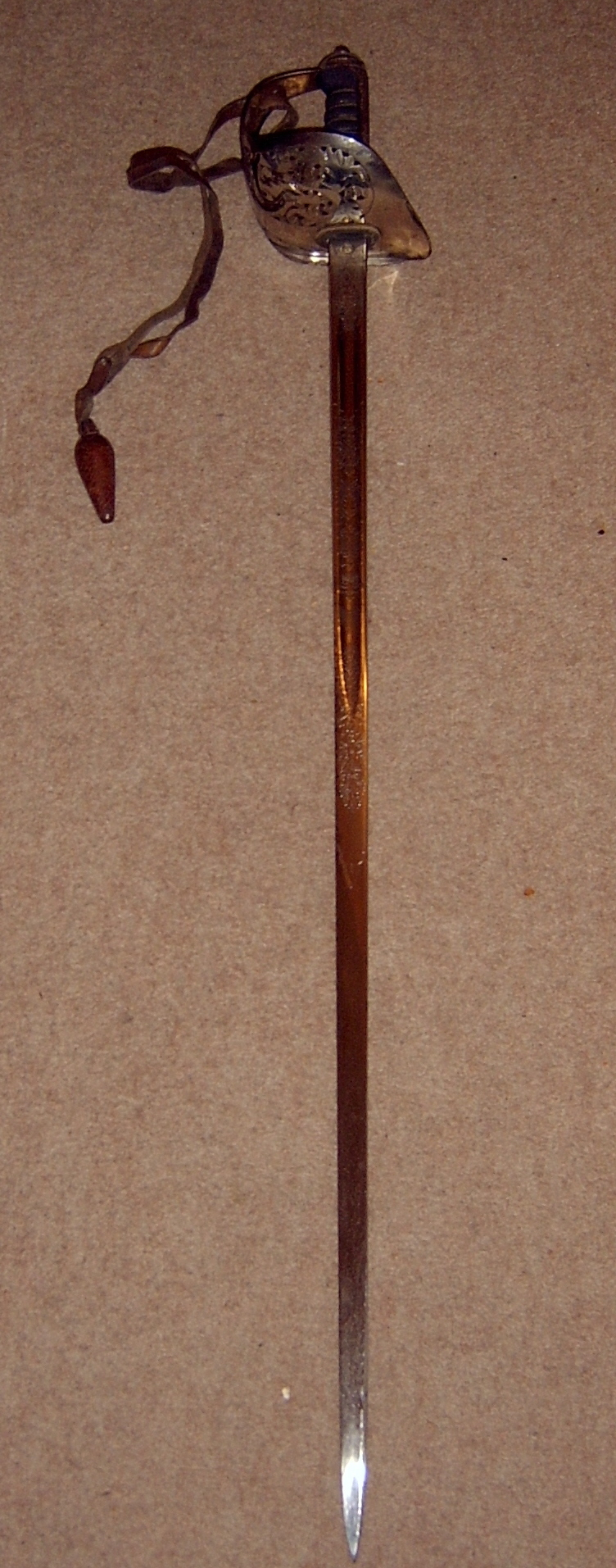
1897 pattern British infantry officer's sword, regulation sword for officers of the line infantry of the British Army since 1897.

The usage of swords in courts-martial was an established tradition within the British armed forces. The accused was marched into their court-martial by an escort armed with a sword. Commissioned officers would be obliged to put their swords on the court table as a symbol of their rank and reputation being put on hold. At the conclusion of the hearing, the tip of the sword was turned towards them if they had been found guilty. The practice was abolished in 2004 following a claim that it was demeaning under the Human Rights Act 1998.

== Practice ==
Traditionally in British courts-martial, all court officials would wear swords as well as all officers, whether they were a witness or were acting for the defence or prosecution. All accused, regardless of rank, would be marched into the courtroom by an armed escort. Officers' escorts would carry a drawn sword. If the accused was not an officer, the escort would carry a drawn cutlass. The accused officer would then have to lay his sword lengthwise on the court table as a symbol of putting his officer's commission and reputation on hold and on the line. When the verdict was decided, the judge would move the sword. If the tip of the sword pointed towards the accused, it meant they had been found guilty. If the sword was either unmoved or the hilt of the sword was pointing towards the accused then he had been found not guilty.

== Abolition in the UK ==
In 2000, two weeks after the Human Rights Act 1998 came into force, a court martial was challenged that all swords should be removed from court as it was claimed to be "degrading". The Judge Advocate at the trial agreed for all present to remove their swords but did so under common law practice, describing them as an "unnecessary encumbrance". The European Court of Human Rights case of Grieves v United Kingdom, which concerned the independence of members of courts martial, referred to the use of swords but this was not part of the issues for determination by the court. In 2004 Her Majesty's Government declared that it would no longer require the accused to be marched in with an armed escort nor would any members present wear sheathed swords. This came after Grieves' solicitor had written to the Secretary of State for Defence comparing the procedure to a "Gilbert and Sullivan opera" and threatened to go back to the European Court for a ruling on swords for being intimidating.

The Royal Australian Navy retains the practice of the sword on the table at courts-martial, as does the Indian Army.
