= Spadroon =

Type of light sword

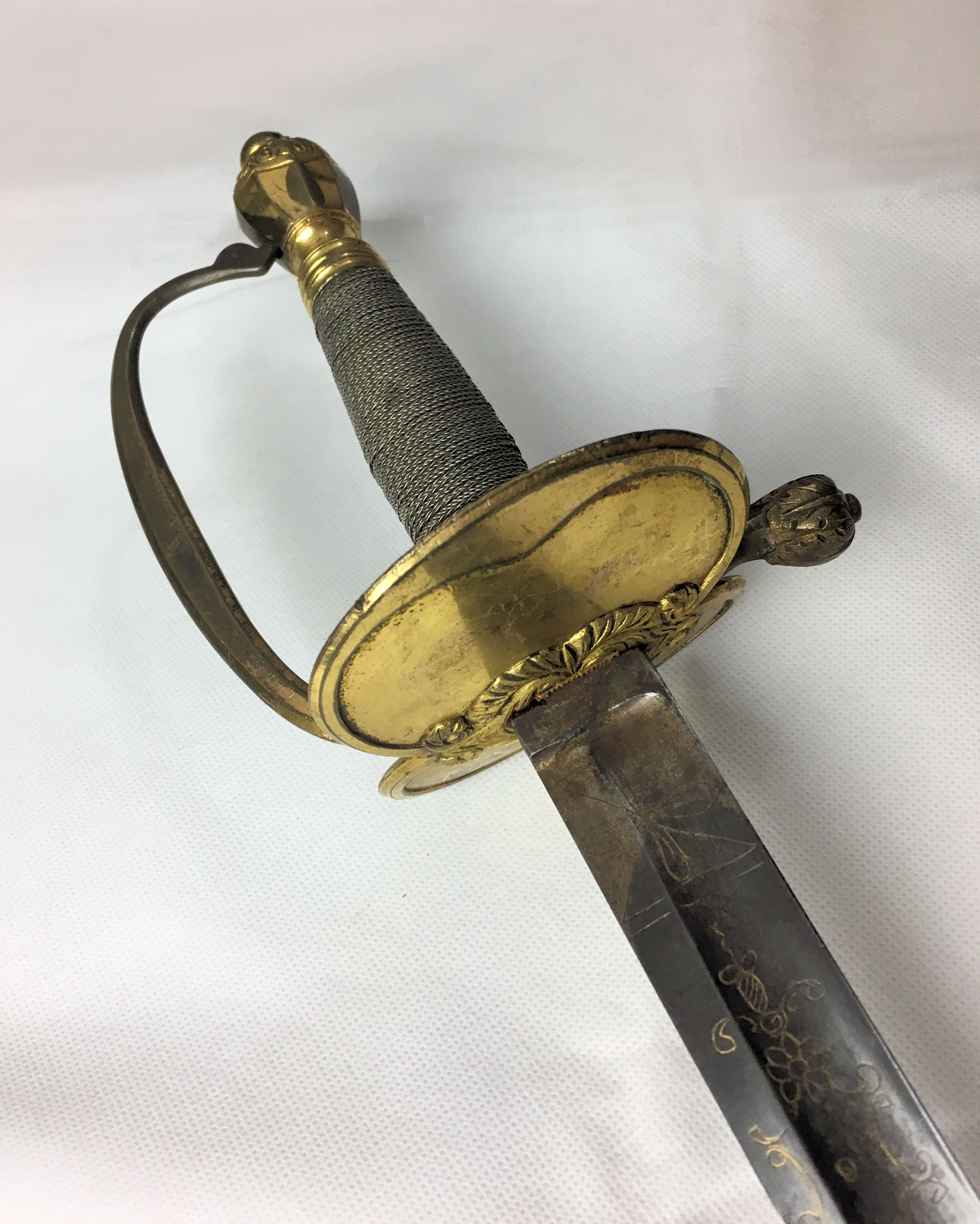
The typical hilt of the most commonly known spadroon, the British 1796 pattern infantry officer's sword. This is the fixed guard version. Many also had a hinged inner guard so that the sword rested flush against the uniform when worn.

A spadroon is a light sword with a straight-edged blade, enabling both cut and thrust attacks. This English term first came into use in the early 18th century, though the type of sword it referred to was in common usage during the late 17th century. They were primarily used as a military (army and navy) sidearm in the late 17th and early 18th centuries, and for officers and NCOs in the latter part of the 18th and early 19th centuries. The type of sword also saw widespread use across Europe and America, though the term 'spadroon' is unique to the Anglophone world.

Spadroon is a term used to categorize a type of sword that is in between a small sword (which thrusts only) and the heavier-bladed broadsword. They may have single- or double-edged blades, and hilt types ranging from a simple stirrup guard, to double shells, and even further protection to the sides of the hand. The distinction between a spadroon and broadsword can sometimes be a difficult one, as it depends upon to what period and weapons they are being compared. The important thing is that the spadroon is fast and agile, due to having little mass at the tip of the blade, and a hilt that does not restrict wrist mobility in any way.

Castle (1892) wrote of it:

A cutting sword of still narrower dimensions, and with a much simpler guard, approximating to that of the small sword, was called 'Spadroon' in England; it was, in fact, similar to the German cut-and-thrust rapier of the eighteenth century, which had been called Spadane or Spadrone since the disuse of the regular two-handed swords ... The German spadroon was a regular double-edged sword, but any very light back or shearing sword was so called in England.

This description is not especially helpful, as spadroons can be found with a number of different hilt types, and there is little evidence of the Germans using such a term. They typically used much more generic terms for a spadroon, such as Degen and Hieber.

== Etymology ==
The term "spadroon" first appeared in English in the early 18th century, notably in Donald McBane's 1728 fencing manual The Expert Sword-Man. (Note: The book is a historic fencing manual, one of the earliest uses of the term.) It refers to a type of light sword designed for both cut and thrust, categorized between the smaller rapier and the heavier broadsword.

The word is believed to have originated from the French espadon or the Italian spadone, which historically designated larger two-handed swords. However, the precise derivation remains uncertain due to limited historical evidence.

Spadroons were widely used by military officers from the late 17th century through the early 19th century and featured various hilt designs, including simple guards, double shells, and more elaborate protections for the hand.

== Origin of the spadroon ==
In its double shell form, the spadroon can be traced to the Mortuary and Walloon hilted broadswords of the mid to late 17th century. These were commonly military weapons fitted with broadsword blades, though many of the lighter examples could well be considered spadroons. However, the deletion of side bars on these hilts is what gives the agility in grip that defines a spadroon.

=== Épée du soldat ===
The French adopted an infantry sword in the late 17th century which they called an épée du soldat (soldier's sword): a broadsword blade fitted to a small sword hilt. They are functionally very much like many spadroons, and this was a style that also gained some popularity in Britain in the same period.

=== Early 18th century ===
Around 1680-1720 a great many British military swords took on a form that finally was called a spadroon. These swords featured light cut and thrust blades, usually double edged. Their hilts looked like a reduced version of the Walloon or Mortuary form. These were highly regarded weapons, as fencing masters Donald McBane and Sir William Hope attested. McBane wrote in his work on swordsmanship, The Expert Sword-Man's Companion (1728), that the spadroon was an “extraordinary weapon that none can compare with it.” Sir William Hope called it "The master of all weapons." These masters also referred to the spadroon as the 'sheering' or 'shearing' sword. Many of these swords share a lot in common with the double 1796 regulation spadroon, but are typically a little heavier and more robust.

== 1786 regulation ==
A hugely significant year for the sword and specifically the spadroon, in army service, was 1786, as it saw the end of pole arms for officers, and the introduction of the first standard for a sword, the 1786 pattern. Though it may be called that today, it was not in fact a pattern at all. 'Pattern' refers to a piece of example equipment that has been accepted for army service. Since the start of the eighteenth century a band of officers (or other responsible persons) has approved the quality and finish of all items of military clothing, it was then sealed with the wax of the Board of Ordnance or other Government (wax) seal to be recognised as the standard to be kept by manufacturers. This allowed manufacturers, tailors, and swordsmiths to have an example to use as a reference for both design and quality. The 1786 sword was not a pattern, but a rather vague description. Nonetheless it was the first standard outlined for army wide service, and so is commonly referred to as the 1786 pattern today but might be better described as the 1786 regulation. The only requirements for the 1786 regulation was that the blade was straight, 32 in (810 mm) long and 1 in (25 mm) wide at the guard, that the guard matched the colour of the buttons of your uniform, and that all officers of a regiment had the same type.

Due to very loose requirements for this regulation, there was much variety found, and few swords were of a new design. Most had been in service for many years before, such as during the American Revolution.

=== Five ball spadroon ===
Many spadroons in the late 18th century featured what has become known as a 'five ball' guard. A five-ball design found on the knucklebow and/or side ring of the guard. These are commonly associated with naval swords, as many are found with fouled anchor, though the style was fashionable amongst the army too. Though it was a fashionable style, five ball spadroons only account for a small amount of spadroons found in the period they were used. They are one of many designs that fit the 1786 regulation, as well as being used before it. There is some evidence to suggest the five ball spadroon is what the French referred to as the épée anglaise.

== 1796 regulation ==
The 1796 pattern sword (spadroon) was the first British infantry sword to truly follow a pattern and be controlled by strict parameters. It followed the same regulation blade outlined in 1786, but now also featured a regulation hilt. A brass gilded double shell guard with knucklebow and urn shaped pommel. A guard that was in fact very similar to many small swords of the day, a fact that leads to them often being mistaken for one another. The 1796 spadroon was not a copy of the small sword, but in fact one in a long lineage of double shell military swords that had been in use in Britain from the late 17th century, as well as in widespread use across Europe. The exact ornamentation of the 1796 was indeed a copy of those carried by the Prussian Frederick the Great and his officers. One shell was often hinged so that the sword sat flush when wearing against the uniform, but this was not part of the regulation, and at the discretion of the purchaser.

The 1796 infantry sword was for use by Infantry officers and NCOs, Royal Artillery officers and NCOs, Royal Engineer officers and other corps (Such as surgeons for example).

It was widely disliked, as is noted in many sources at the time. Officers had to purchase their own swords, and so whilst many 1796 pattern spadroons are poor weapons, it is entirely possible to specify and make a successful and effective sword within the parameters of the regulation. Therefore, decent fighting weapons do exist among surviving examples of this pattern type, as well as many that range from adequate to poor fighting weapons. Attempts to replace this spadroon with a robust sabre were only partially successful. With an infantry pattern introduced in 1803, and many non-regulation sabres carried both within and against the regulations of the day. Despite this, the 1796 spadroon lived on until it was replaced in army service in 1822 by a new model of sabre, and ended the use of the spadroon in British army service, and in Naval use in 1827 (also by a new sabre pattern).

== Later use ==
Many straight, light cut and thrust swords continued in use throughout the 19th century, such as the French 1882 Infantry officer's sword, and the British 1892/1895/1897 pattern infantry officers' swords. These were not called spadroons but are certainly the same type of weapon in functional terms.

In America, the spadroon lived on in the form of the 1840 model, which closely resembled British 1796 pattern.

== Practice today ==
Several modern Historical Fencing, or HEMA clubs around the world also practice the spadroon.
