= Pattern 1831 sabre for General Officers =

British general's sabre

Production history
- Designed: 1831
- Manufacturer: Various
- Produced: 1831 to present

Specifications
- Length: Blade - 31.0 in (79 cm)
- Blade type: Curved, slab-sided, asymmetric point, false edge.
- Hilt type: 'Mameluke hilt' with simple cross-guard.
- Scabbard/sheath: Brass, wood liners, 2 loose suspension rings, later steel scabbards were introduced.

The Pattern 1831 sabre for General Officers is a British army pattern sword prescribed for the use of officers of the rank of major-general and above. It has been in continuous use from 1831 to the present. It is an example of a type of sword described as a mameluke sabre.

== Background ==
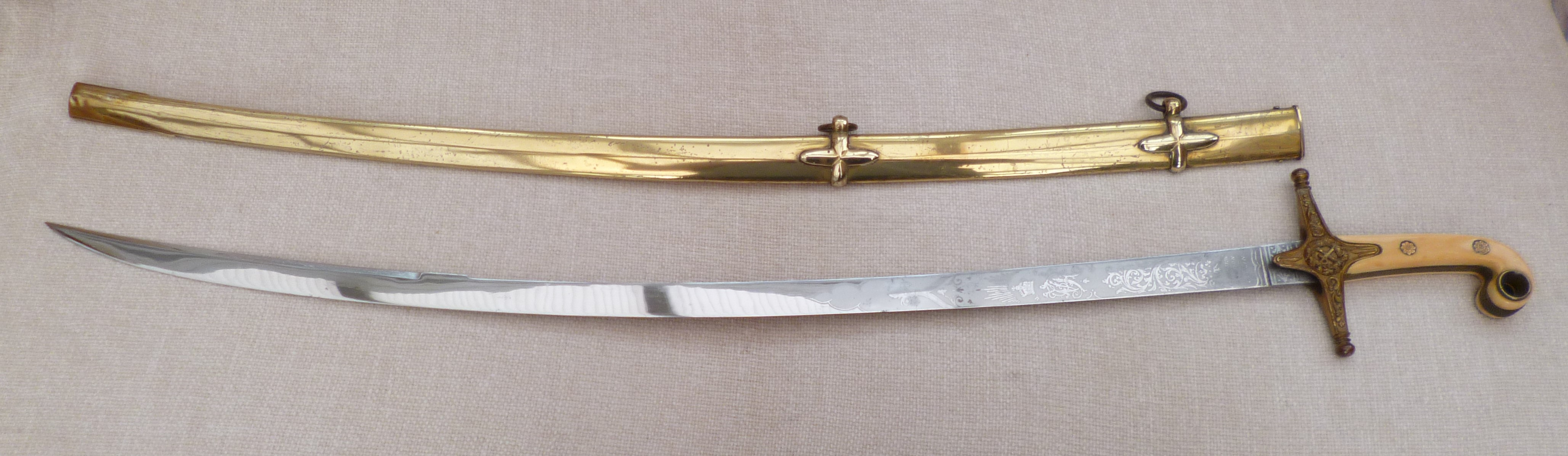
British Pattern 1831 sabre and scabbard. This particular sword is mid-Victorian and was retailed by J.B. Johnstone of London and Dublin, who were tailors and military outfitters. The blade retains almost all of its original mirror-polished finish

Both French and British army officers encountered kilij and shamshir sabres as a result of Napoleon's expedition to Egypt (1798–1801). Termed 'mameluke sabres' after the Mamluk warrior caste of Egypt, they became a fashionable accessory for officers, particularly senior officers. Similar swords were also found in India, and these probably influenced British officers also. Mameluke swords, both Middle Eastern and copies made in Europe, were adopted, unofficially, by officers of light cavalry regiments in the first decade of the 19th century, some were used as 'walking out swords' (for ornamental wear on social occasions on foot) but others were employed on active campaign. They are prominent in images of officers of the British Hussar regiments painted by Robert Dighton jr. in 1807. As officially regulated dress or levée swords they first appear in 1822 for lancer regiments. Soon, other light cavalry and some heavy cavalry regiments also adopted similar patterns.

In 1822, generals and staff officers adopted a variant of the 1822 infantry officer's sword (often referred to as the 'Gothic hilt sabre'). It differed only in minor decorative elements of the guard and in the decoration of the blade. The decision to introduce a mameluke sword as the official regulation sword for officers of the rank of major-general and above is generally ascribed to the Duke of Wellington, who is known to have favoured this type of sword himself.

== Design ==
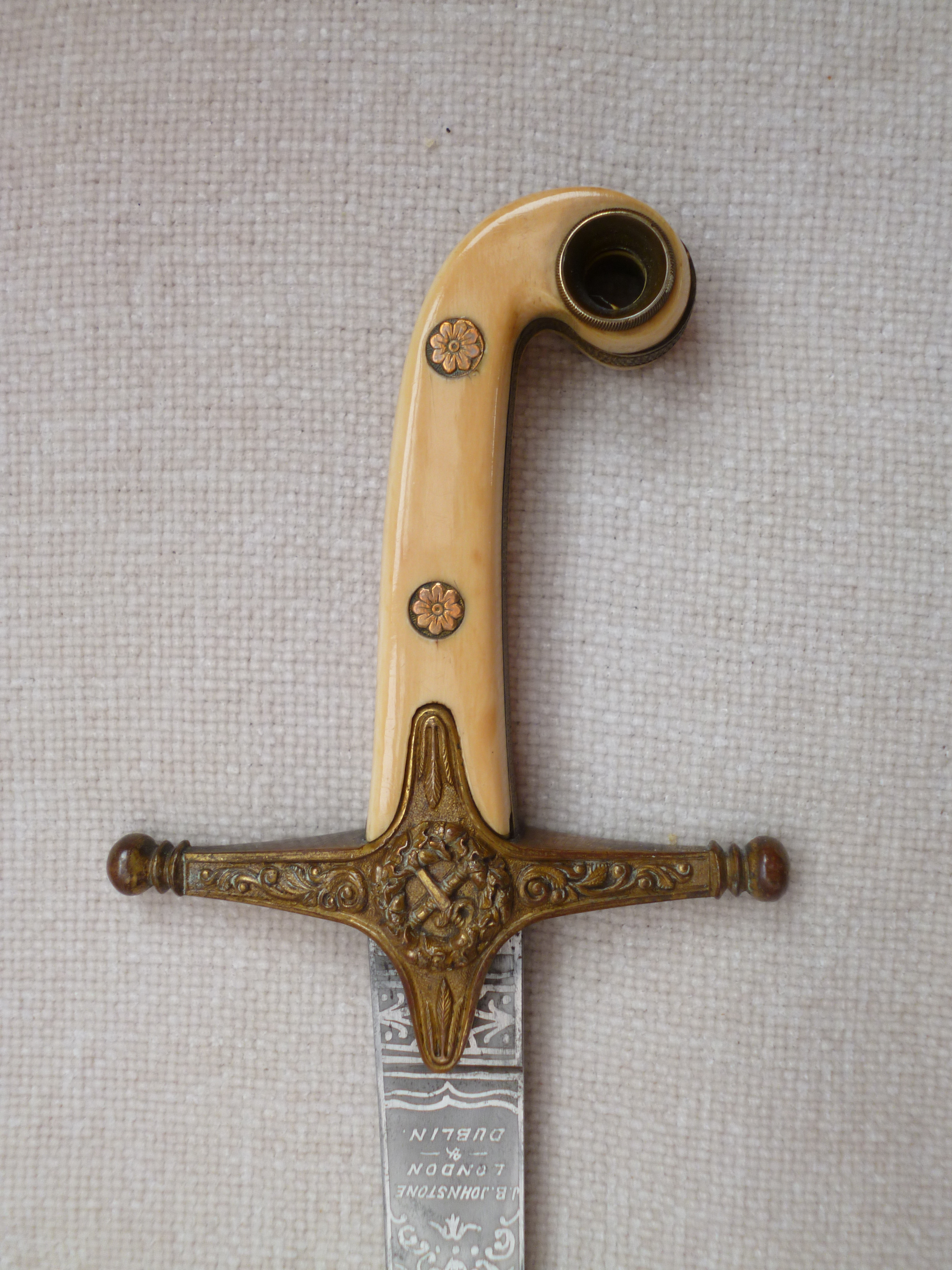
Hilt of the Pattern 1831 sabre. This sword has grip scales of mammoth ivory.

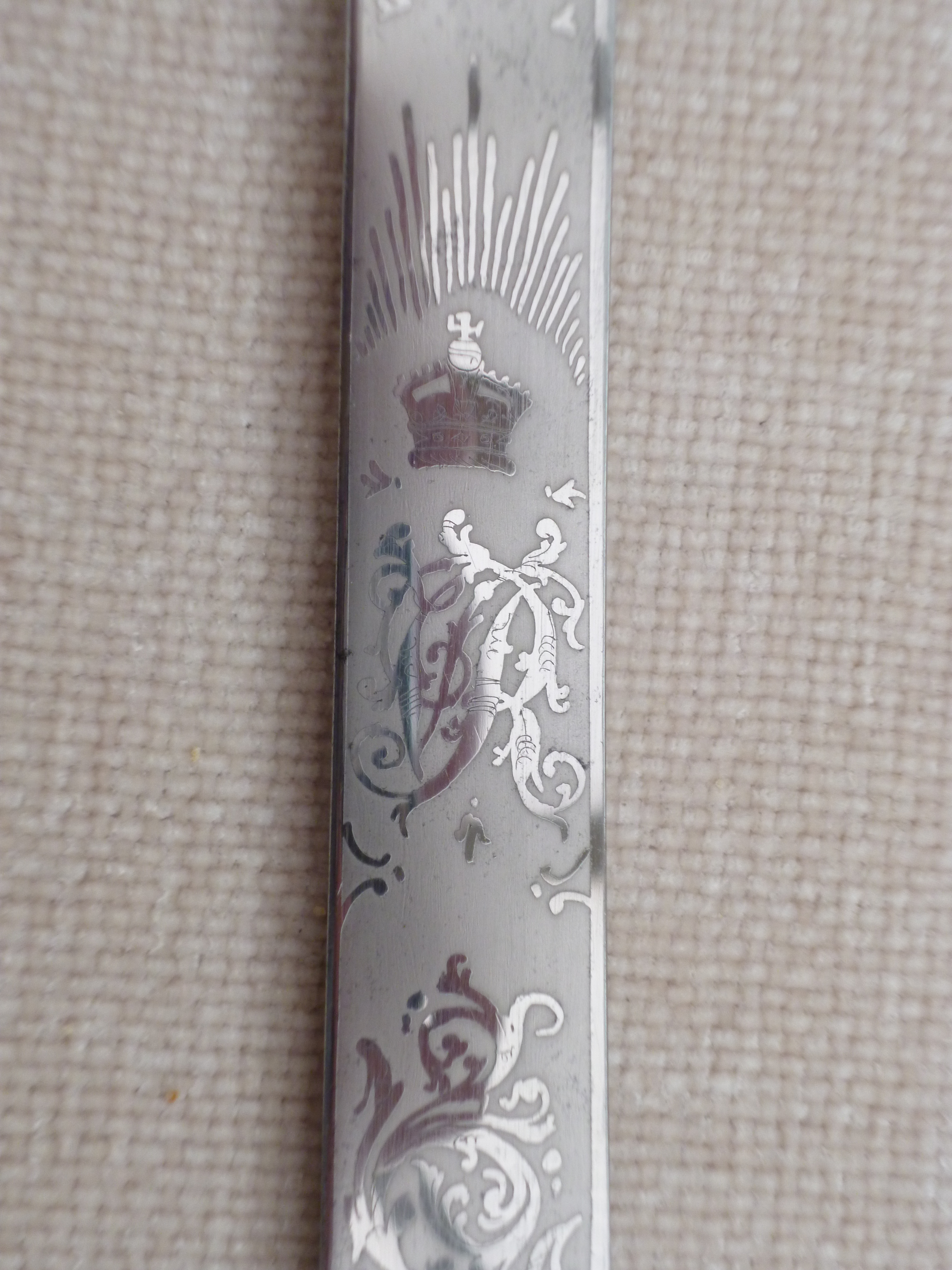
Detail of frost-etched decoration of the blade, showing a crown over the 'VR' monogram of Queen Victoria.

The 1831 pattern general officer's sabre was directly influenced by existing mameluke swords worn by officers of various cavalry regiments. It differs from the levée sword of the 3rd Light Dragoons only in very minor elements of decoration.

The hilt and blade retain many features of the Turkish kilij from which it was derived. These include the simple cross-guard with two opposing langets and the down curving 'pistol-grip' shaped pommel; the blade retains the yelman false-edge and the step to the back of the blade (latchet) close to it. As a dress sword, it is of relatively lightweight construction. The weight of the sword is about 1 lb 10.5 oz (750 g) and the scabbard about 1 lb 1 oz (480 g). The 31 inch-long (79 cm) blade is slab-sided and of a V-shaped cross-section, it is double-edged for its last 12 inches (the yelman) and comes to a relatively acute asymmetric point. The flat sides of the blade afford a large area for decoration. This decoration, of acid-etching (often described as 'frost-etched'), varies greatly between makers but usually includes: a crossed baton and sabre, the monarch's monogram under a crown, and sprigs of oak or palm (or both). Acanthus leaf and scrolling plant motifs may also be present. Many blades were produced with a reserved section where the purchaser could have his initials or family crest added.

The hilt has a cross-guard with its écusson decorated with an oak leaf and acorn civic crown containing a crossed baton and sabre. The hilt elements (guard, grip scales and strap) are held together and attached to the blade tang by two bolts hidden by brass rosettes. The prominent sword-knot hole has bushing in two parts which also screw together, adding to the solidity of the hilt. All the metallic hilt elements are of gilt-brass. The grip scales were originally of ivory, either elephant or mammoth, but in late Victorian times synthetic ivory-substitutes (such as 'ivorine') began to be used. Recent and modern swords were/are only produced using synthetic ivory.

The 1831 sabre was initially produced with two scabbards, a black leather scabbard with elaborate gilt mounts intended for lévees and evening functions and a brass scabbard for all other occasions. In practise the leather scabbard was soon dispensed with and the brass scabbard used universally. The brass scabbard has wood liners, two cross-shaped mounts for loose suspension rings and a square toe with a vestigial shoe/drag. In 1898 the brass scabbard was replaced by a steel scabbard of the same form.

The pattern was also adopted for field marshals, royal equerries and lords lieutenant of counties, with only minor differences in decoration. The cross-guard écusson decoration of crossed baton and sabre is replaced by two crossed batons for field marshals, royal equerries employ the monarch's cypher and lords lieutenant use national symbols appropriate to their county (rose for England, thistle for Scotland, shamrock for Northern Ireland and 'Prince of Wales' feathers' for Wales).

== Use ==
Despite the blades of the 1831 sabre having to pass an official proving test (many specimens have brass 'proof slugs' inset into the blade near the hilt) the sword was never intended for combat use. The description of the proof test includes the phrase, "The blade recovers straightness after being subjected to a weight of 10 lbs vertically with 1 inch depression". The blades are of too light a weight for effective cutting and are too flexible for thrusting. Throughout the 19th century, when on active campaign, generals employed the service swords particular to the corps they were a member of before their promotion. This was officially recognised in the Dress Regulations of 1900. The sabre was and is intended for dress wear, at levées, parades, inspections and other formal occasions when full-dress would be worn.

== See also ==
- Kilij
