= Pattern 1796 heavy cavalry sword =

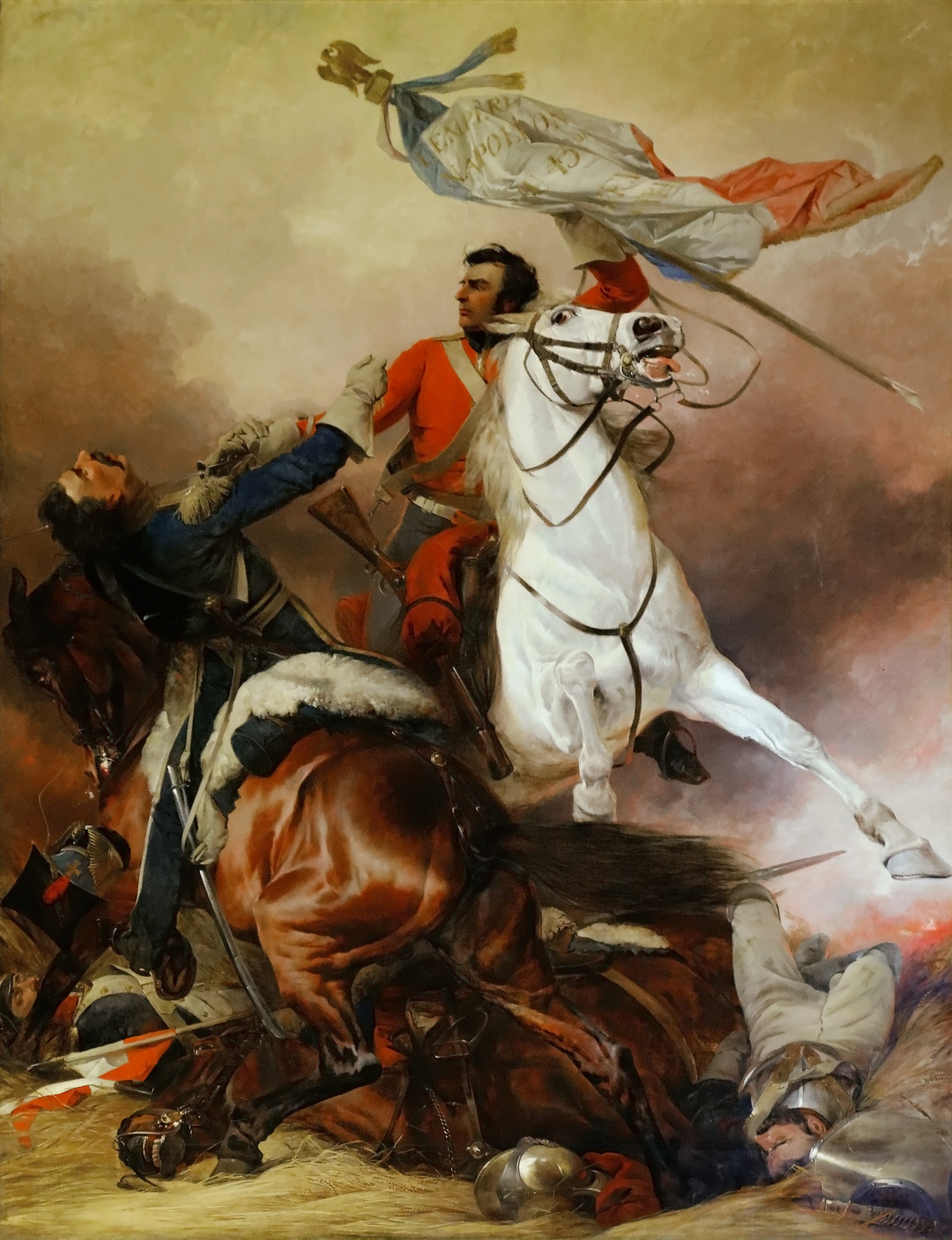
- Sergeant Charles Ewart of the Scots Greys at Waterloo, wielding the 1796 pattern sword as he captures the eagle of the 45^{e} Ligne

Production history
- Designed: 1796
- Manufacturer: Various
- Produced: 1796-1821

Specifications
- Length: Blade: 35 in (890 mm)
- Blade type: Straight, single fuller, hatchet point (often modified).
- Hilt type: Disc-guard and single knucklebow.
- Scabbard/sheath: Iron, wood liners, 2 loose suspension rings.

The Pattern 1796 heavy cavalry sword was the straight-bladed military sword used by the British heavy cavalry (Lifeguards, Royal Horse Guards, Dragoon Guards and Dragoons), and King's German Legion Dragoons, through most of the period of the Revolutionary and Napoleonic Wars. It played an especially notable role, in the hands of British cavalrymen, at the battles of Salamanca and Waterloo. The pattern was adopted by Sweden and was used by some Portuguese cavalry.

== Background ==
The British 1796 Heavy Cavalry Trooper's Sword was a direct copy of the Austrian pallasch sword pattern of 1769 for heavy cavalry (it later received an iron scabbard (1775), in which form it was adopted by the British). John Le Marchant, a cavalry officer who designed the curved 1796 pattern light cavalry sabre, undoubtedly saw the Austrian weapon in use during the Low Countries Campaign of 1793-95, when he also made many drawings of Austrian cavalry equipment. His initial intention was that his own sword design should be adopted by all the cavalry; however, this was denied by the decision of the board of general officers to arm the heavy cavalry with a straight sword. It is probable, once a straight sword had been decided upon, that he then suggested the Austrian sword as a model.

== Design ==
=== Trooper's pattern ===
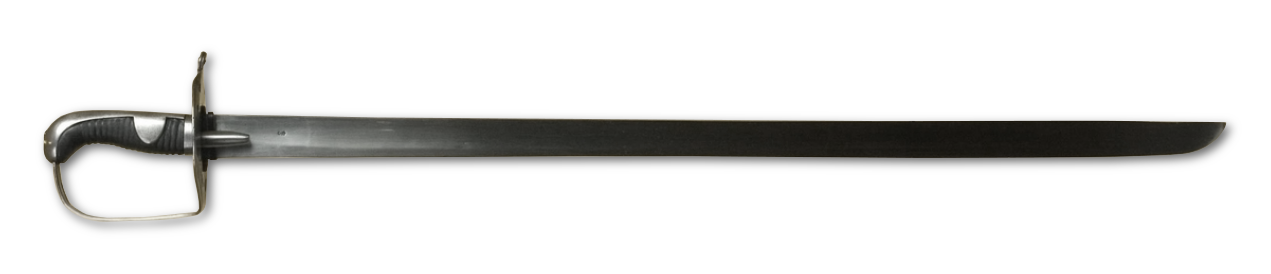
m/1808 Swedish version of British 1796 Heavy Cavalry Sword.

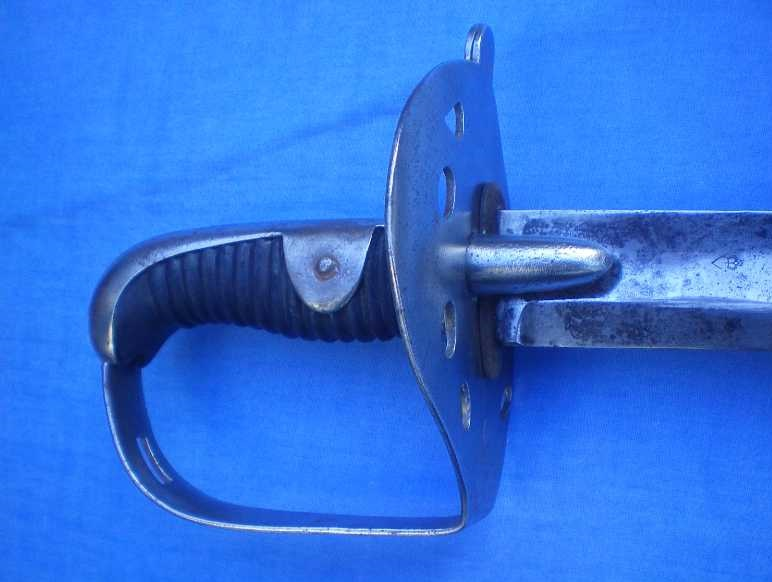
British Pattern 1796 heavy cavalry trooper's sword

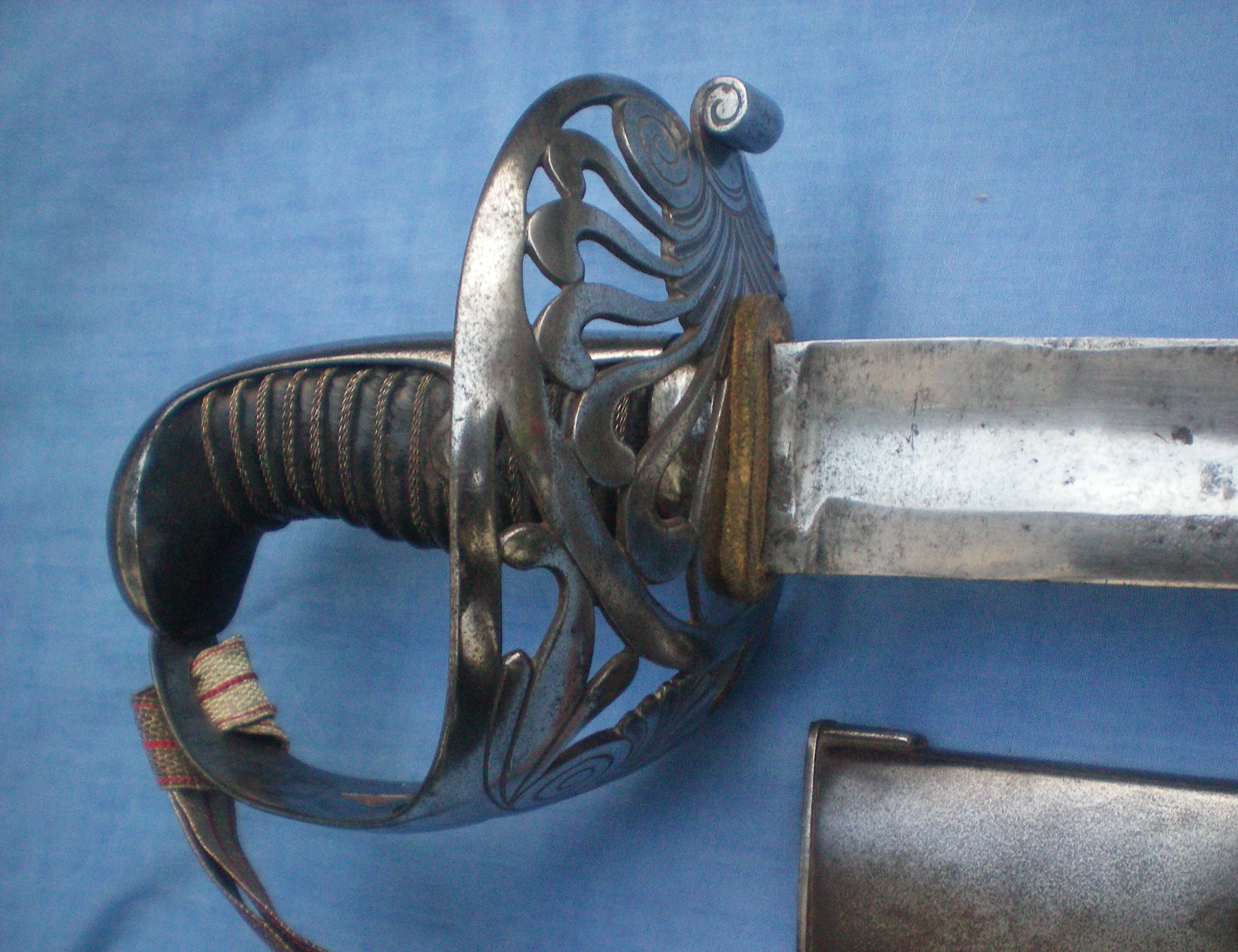
Hilt of British pattern 1796 heavy cavalry officers sword

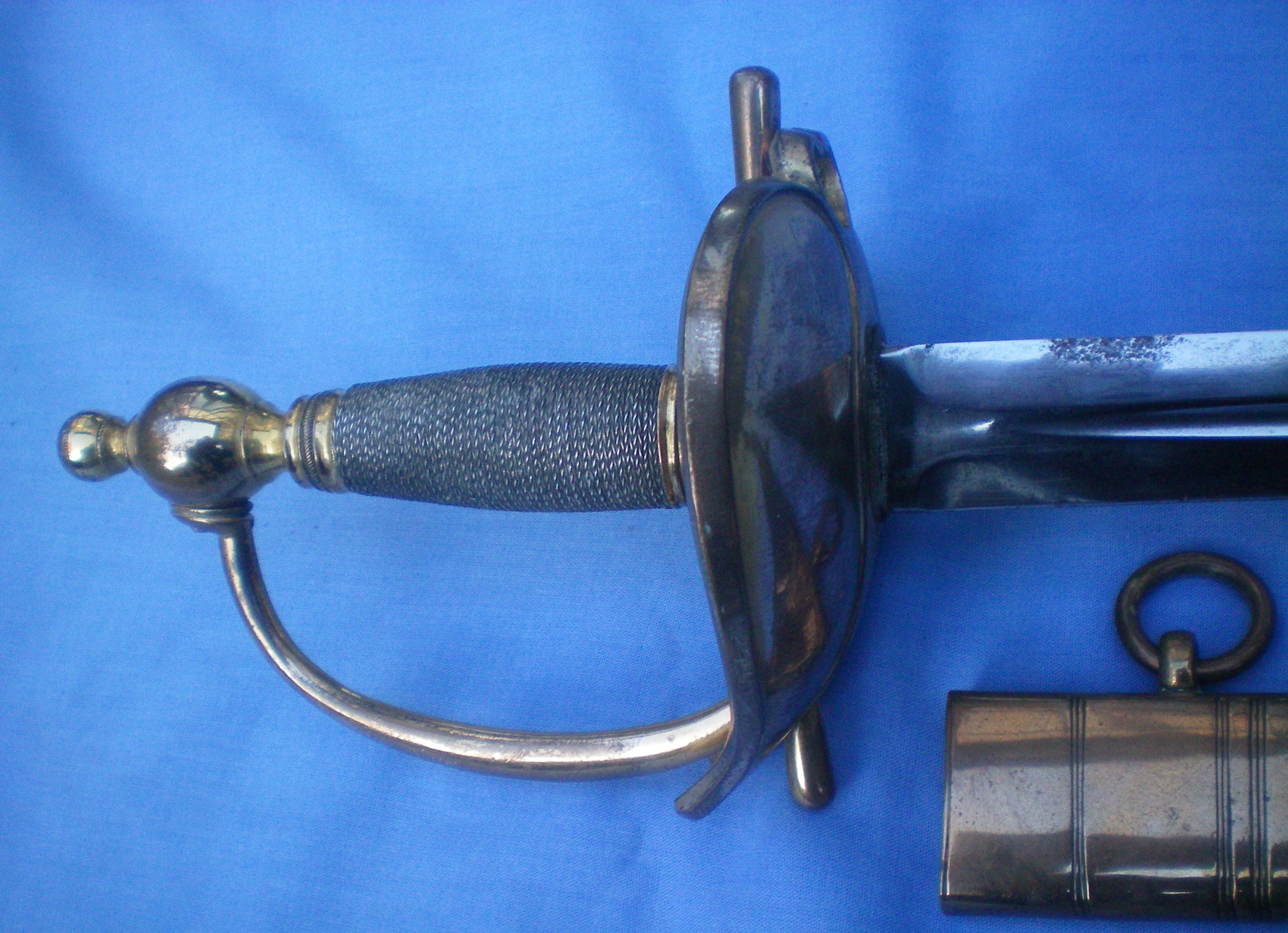
Hilt of Pattern 1796 heavy cavalry officer's dress sword

Technically the 1796 heavy cavalry sword is a backsword, that is a sword with a straight blade with one cutting edge and the opposite edge of the blade (the "back") thickened for most of its length to give added strength. The blade is 35 inches (890 mm) in length, with a single broad fuller each side. The grip is of ribbed wood, or wood bound with cord to resemble the same, and covered in leather. The iron backpiece of the grip has ears which are riveted through the tang of the blade to give the hilt and blade a very secure connection. The hilt combines a disc guard pierced with 2 semicircular and 6 oval (never circular) holes, with single knucklebow and two slim 2-inch-long (51 mm) langets (projections from the guard) extending from the front of the guard. The langets were often removed and the left side of the guard ground away so as to reduce wear to uniforms. The latter modification would also have made it more comfortable to wear, especially on horseback.

The sword was often modified by its users. The point was originally a 'hatchet point', a curved diagonal front edge similar to that of the Japanese katana, but most were altered to a symmetrical 'spear point', more common at the time, or alternatively made more acute whilst retaining the asymmetry of the tip. This was done in order to improve the sword's ability to thrust. Quite large numbers of spear-pointed examples exist with 33-inch (840 mm) blades, along with an appropriately shortened scabbard. These may be conversions of the original standard 35-inch (890 mm) blade, although many appear to have been manufactured to this shorter length. The sword was carried in an iron scabbard with wooden liners, and hung from the waist via sword-belt slings attached to two loose suspension rings.

=== Household cavalry other ranks ===
Variant sword types with the standard trooper's blade, but a bowl hilt similar to that of the officers' pattern, in brass with a brass scabbard (for the Life Guards) or iron with an iron scabbard (for the Horse Guards), exist and are believed to have been issued to the other ranks of the Household regiments for use when on home (ceremonial) service. The scabbards of these swords did not usually have suspension rings, but were fitted with a button or slide for use with a 'frog' - a type of baldric or belt attachment. It is known that the Household regiments employed the standard trooper's pattern swords on active service.

=== Officer's patterns ===
Officers carried a service sword, also termed an "undress sword", with a blade of identical general form to that of the trooper's pattern detailed above. However, many officers' blades bore etched, or blued and gilt, decoration. The guard, in contrast, was entirely different from the trooper's pattern, being of bowl form, and incorporating an elaborate pierced honeysuckle design with a prominent rear quillon. This hilt form is often referred to as a 'ladder hilt' (due to the pierced knucklebow resembling a ladder).

The dress sword for Heavy Cavalry officers was a much smaller and lighter weapon, having a knucklebow, ovoid pommel and boat-shell guard in gilt brass or gunmetal. The blade was much shorter and narrower than the service sword's, and usually double edged with a short narrow central fuller each side. The dress sword usually had a leather scabbard with gilt brass mounts, however, a number of examples exist of swords with iron service scabbards, suggesting that some officers may have employed the dress sword in the field.

== Use ==
The trooper's sword, and the officer's undress sword, was a dedicated cutting weapon with a broad heavy blade and was renowned as being completely unfit for delicate swordsmanship. This was also the foundation for respect it gained from those who appreciated it; most cavalry troopers used the blades like bludgeons and the guards as knuckle dusters (as Le Marchant observed) and the 1796 was significantly more suited for this than most other swords.

A well-known description of the brutal power of the weapon was made by Sgt. Charles Ewart, 2nd Dragoons (Scots Greys) concerning how he captured an Imperial Eagle at Waterloo:

"It was in the charge I took the eagle off the enemy; he and I had a hard contest for it; he made a thrust at my groin I parried it off and cut him down through the head. After this a lancer came at me; I threw the lance off my right side, and cut him through the chin upwards through the teeth. Next, a foot soldier fired at me, then charged me with his bayonet, which I also had the good luck to parry, and I cut him down through the head; thus ended the contest."

== In fiction ==
The fictional character most often associated with the 1796 Heavy Cavalry Sword is Richard Sharpe, Bernard Cornwell's Napoleonic Rifle officer.

== See also ==
- Pattern 1796 infantry officer's sword
- Pattern 1796 light cavalry sabre
