= Pattern 1796 light cavalry sabre =

British cavalry sabre

Production history
- Designer: John Le Marchant/Henry Osborn
- Designed: 1796
- Manufacturer: Various
- Produced: 1796-1821

Specifications
- Length: Blade - 32.5–33 in (83–84 cm)
- Blade type: Curved, single fuller, asymmetric point.
- Hilt type: Single knucklebow of "stirrup" type.
- Scabbard/sheath: Iron, wood liners, 2 loose suspension rings

The Pattern 1796 light cavalry sabre is a sword that was used primarily by British light dragoons and hussars, and King's German Legion light cavalry during the Napoleonic Wars. It was adopted by the Prussians (as the 1811 pattern or "Blücher sabre") and used by Portuguese and Spanish cavalry.

== Background ==
During the early part of the French Revolutionary Wars, the British Army launched an expeditionary force into Flanders. With the invading army was a young captain of the 2nd Dragoon Guards, serving as a brigade major, John Gaspard Le Marchant. Le Marchant noted the lack of professional skill displayed by the horsemen and the clumsy design of the heavy, over-long swords then in use (the 1788 Patterns) and decided to do something about it. Among many other things Le Marchant did to improve the cavalry, he designed, in collaboration with the Birmingham sword cutler Henry Osborn, a new sabre. This was adopted by the British Army as the Pattern 1796 Light Cavalry Sabre. Le Marchant wanted his sabre to be adopted by all British cavalry, but the board of general officers decided to arm the heavy cavalry with a straight sword.

== Design ==
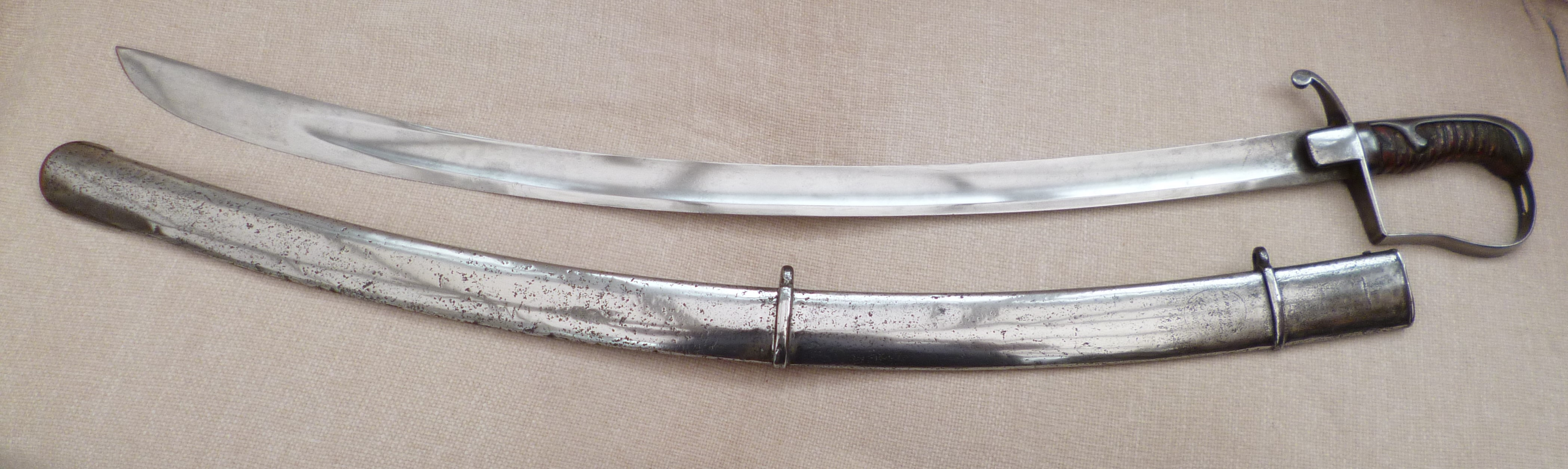
An officer's 1796 Pattern Light Cavalry fighting sabre by J. Johnston, Newcastle Street, The Strand, London. Note the characteristic increase in blade width near to the point. The scabbard has lost its suspension rings.

An eastern influence can be detected in the blade form, and Le Marchant is recorded as saying that the "blades of the Turks, Mamalukes, Moors and Hungarians [were] preferable to any other". The post 1630, knuckle bow hilted, fullered, szabla, of the Polish-Hungarian Hussars, is sometimes credited as Le Marchant's inspiration for the pattern.

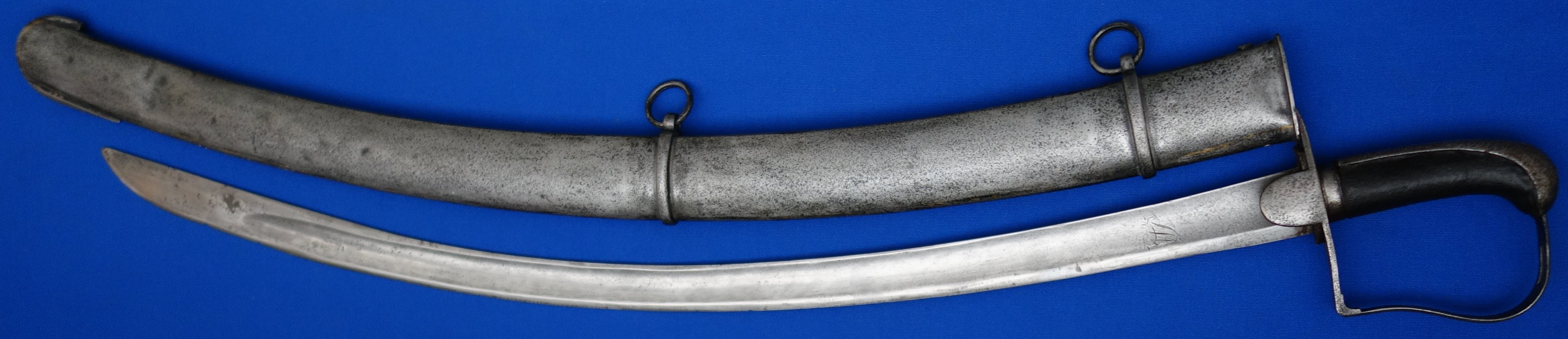
An officer's 1796 Pattern Light Cavalry fighting sabre - belonging to William Tomkinson of the 16th Light Dragoons; the sword shows evidence of having been ground down in the quarter of the blade nearest the point - possibly due to damage to the edge - it no longer exhibits the increase in blade width near to the point

The British sword is similar to some tulwars in the widening of the blade near the tip, which is gradual and does not incorporate a step (latchet) as is found in the yelman of the Turkish kilij. This similarity prompted some Indian armourers to re-hilt old 1796 pattern blades as tulwars later in the 19th century.

=== Trooper pattern sabre ===
The 1796 sabre had a pronounced curve, making the kind of slashing attacks used in cavalry actions decidedly easier. Even cavalrymen trained to use the thrust, as the French were, in the confusion of a melee often reverted to instinctive hacking, which the 1796 accommodated. Its blade, unlike other European sabres of the period, widened near the point. This affected balance, but made slashes far more brutal; its action in the cut has been compared to a modern bacon slicer. It is said that this design feature prompted unofficial complaints from French officers, but this is unconfirmed. The blade of the light cavalry sabre was 32.5 to 33 inches (83 to 84 cm) long and had a single broad fuller on each side. The sabre was lighter and easier to use than its heavy cavalry counterpart, the pattern 1796 Heavy Cavalry Sword, which had a less 'scientific' design. The hilt was of the simple 'stirrup' form with a single iron knucklebow and quillon, so as to be free of unnecessary weight; the intention of this was to make the sabre usable by all cavalrymen, not solely the largest and strongest. A typical trooper's sabre would weigh nearly 2 lb 2oz (0.96 kg). In common with the contemporary heavy cavalry sword, the iron backpiece of the leather-covered wooden grip had ears which were riveted through the tang of the blade to give the hilt and blade a very secure connection. It was carried in an iron scabbard, with wooden liners, and hung from the waist via sword-belt slings attached to two loose suspension rings.

=== Officers' sabres ===
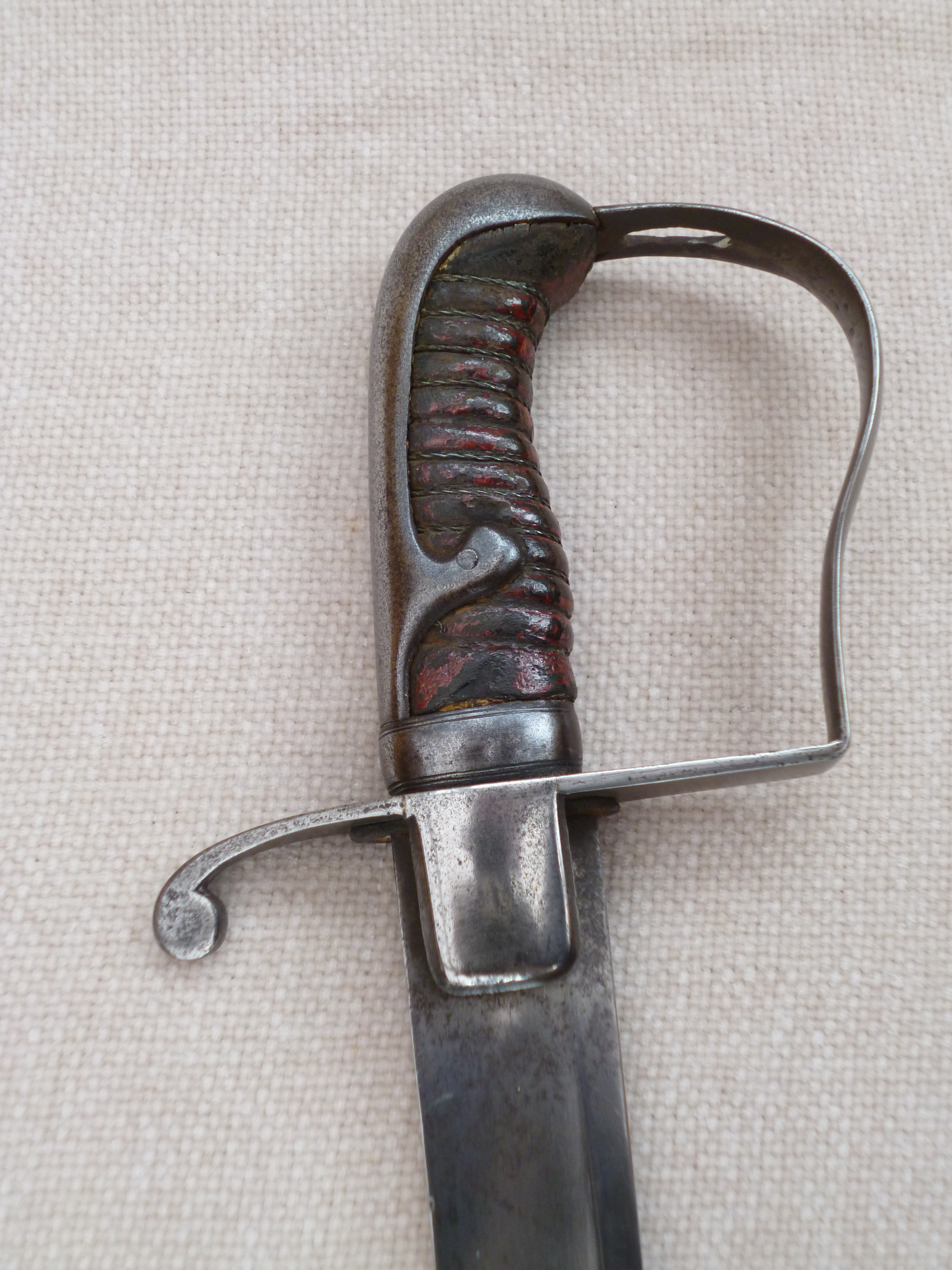
Hilt of an officer's fighting 1796 LC pattern sabre. The unusual square langets (most are rounded or shield-shaped) is a characteristic of the sabres made by the London sword cutler J. Johnston

Officers carried fighting swords very similar in form to those of the trooper version, though they tended to be lighter, at around 1 lb 13oz (0.83 kg), in weight and show evidence of higher levels of finish and workmanship. They were also distinguished in the hilt by the grips being wire-wound (silver or gilt copper/brass) and in the backpiece having reduced-size ears, often comma-shaped, or no ears at all. Officers stationed in India sometimes had the hilts and scabbards of their swords silvered as a protection against the high humidity of the monsoon season. Unlike the officers of the heavy cavalry, light cavalry officers did not have a pattern dress sword. As a result of this there were many swords made which copied elements of the 1796 pattern design but incorporated a high degree of decoration, such as blue and gilt or frost-etched blades, and gilt-bronze hilts. At their most showy, sabres with ivory grips and lion's-head pommels are not unknown. Such swords were primarily intended for dress wear. Soon after 1800 'Mameluke-hilted' sabres, either original Turkish kilij swords or copies derived from them, became popular for officers to wear when on foot in full dress. This was because they were fashionable, plus they were shorter and lighter than the pattern sabre.

== Use ==
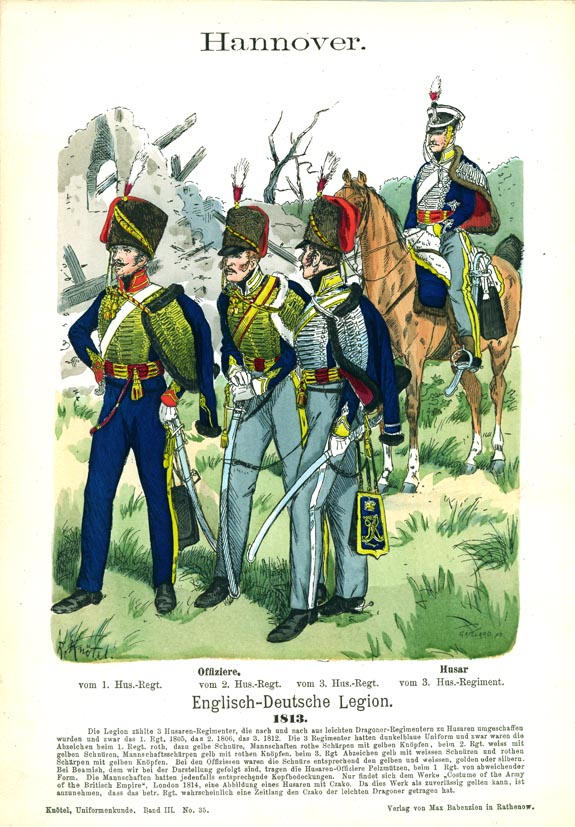
Light cavalry of the King's German Legion in 1813, all armed with the 1796 sabre

The mounted swordsmanship training of the British emphasised the cut, at the face for maiming or killing, or at the arms to disable. This left masses of mutilated or disabled troops; the French, in contrast, favoured the thrust, which gave cleaner kills. A cut with the 1796 LC sabre was, however, perfectly capable of killing outright, as was recorded by George Farmer of the 11th Regiment of Light Dragoons, who was involved in a skirmish on the Guadiana River in 1811, during the Peninsular War:

Just then a French officer stooping over the body of one of his countrymen, who dropped the instant on his horse's neck, delivered a thrust at poor Harry Wilson's body; and delivered it effectually. I firmly believe that Wilson died on the instant yet, though he felt the sword in its progress, he, with characteristic self-command, kept his eye on the enemy in his front; and, raising himself in his stirrups, let fall upon the Frenchman's head such a blow, that brass and skull parted before it, and the man's head was cloven asunder to the chin. It was the most tremendous blow I ever beheld struck; and both he who gave, and his opponent who received it, dropped dead together. The brass helmet was afterwards examined by order of a French officer, who, as well as myself, was astonished at the exploit; and the cut was found to be as clean as if the sword had gone through a turnip, not so much as a dint being left on either side of it.

== Fame ==
The blade is remembered today as one of the best of its time and has been described as the finest cutting sword ever manufactured in quantity. Officers of the famous 95th Rifles, other light infantry regiments and the "flank" companies of line regiments adopted swords with an identical hilt to the 1796 light cavalry sabre, but with a lighter and shorter blade. The sabre was also copied by the Prussians; indeed, some Imperial German troops were equipped with almost identical swords into the First World War. The Americans also adopted a pattern which was directly influenced by the British sword.

== See also ==
- Pattern 1796 infantry officer's sword
- Hussar szabla
