= Sword =

Long bladed weapon

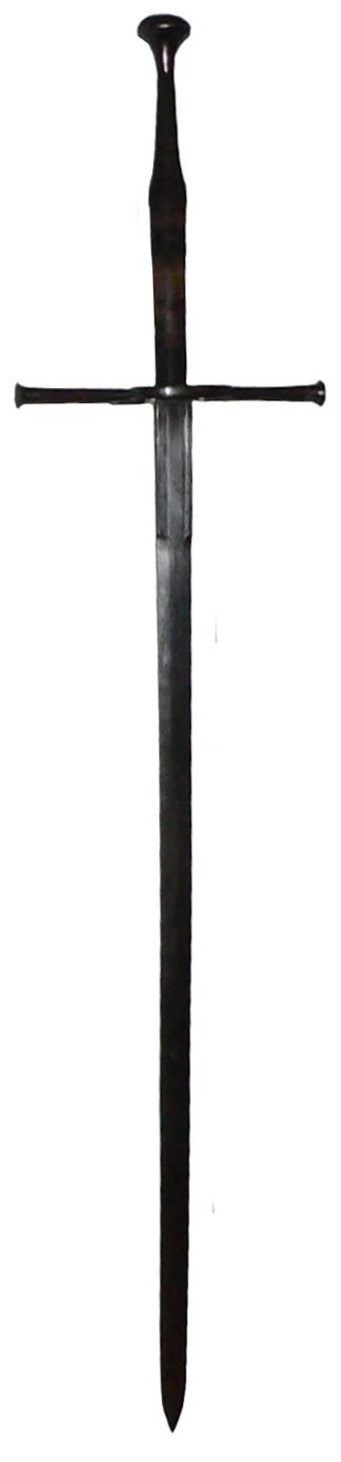
Swiss longsword, 15th or 16th century

A sword is an edged, bladed weapon intended for manual cutting or thrusting. Its blade, longer than that of a knife or dagger, is attached to a hilt and can be straight or curved. A thrusting sword tends to have a straighter blade with a pointed tip. A slashing sword is more likely to be curved and to have a sharpened cutting edge on one or both sides of the blade. Many swords are designed for both thrusting and slashing. The precise definition of a sword varies by historical epoch and geographic region.

Historically, the sword developed in the Bronze Age, evolving from the dagger; the earliest specimens date to about 1600 BC. The later Iron Age sword remained fairly short and without a crossguard. The spatha, as it developed in the Late Roman army, became the predecessor of the European sword of the Middle Ages, at first adopted as the Migration Period sword, and only in the High Middle Ages, developed into the classical arming sword with crossguard. The word sword continues the Old English, sweord.

The use of a sword is known as swordsmanship or, in a modern context, as fencing. In the early modern period, western sword design diverged into two forms, the thrusting swords and the sabres.

Thrusting swords such as the rapier and eventually the smallsword were designed to impale their targets quickly and inflict deep stab wounds. Their long and straight yet light and well balanced design made them highly maneuverable and deadly in a duel but fairly ineffective when used in a slashing or chopping motion. A well aimed lunge and thrust could end a fight in seconds with just the sword's point, leading to the development of a fighting style which closely resembles modern fencing.

Slashing swords such as the sabre and similar blades such as the cutlass were built more heavily and were more typically used in warfare. Built for slashing and chopping at multiple enemies, often from horseback, the sabre's long curved blade and slightly forward weight balance gave it a deadly character all its own on the battlefield. Most sabres also had sharp points and double-edged blades, making them capable of piercing soldier after soldier in a cavalry charge. Sabres continued to see battlefield use until the early 20th century. The US Navy M1917 Cutlass used in World War I was kept in their armory well into World War II and many Marines were issued a variant called the M1941 Cutlass as a makeshift jungle machete during the Pacific War.

Non-European weapons classified as swords include single-edged weapons such as the Middle Eastern scimitar, the Chinese dao and the related Japanese katana. The Chinese jiàn 剑 is an example of a non-European double-edged sword, like the European models derived from the double-edged Iron Age sword.

== History ==
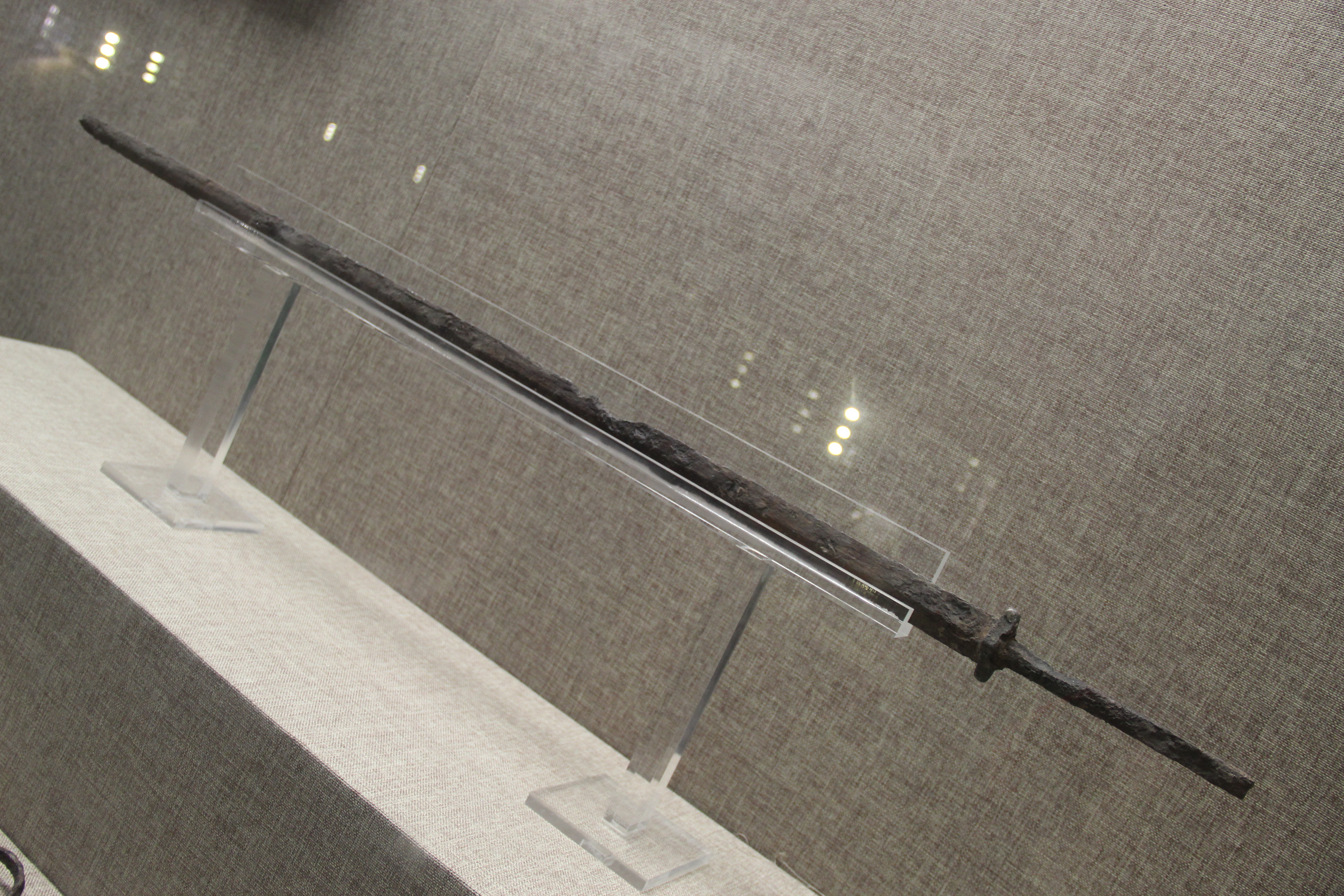
Western Han iron sword

=== Prehistory and antiquity ===
==== Bronze Age ====
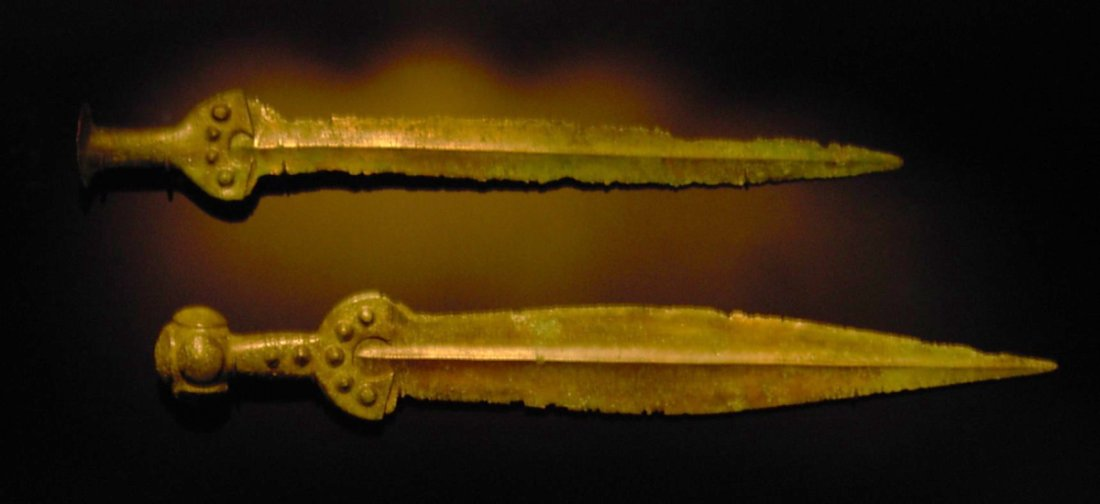
Apa-type swords, 17th-century BC

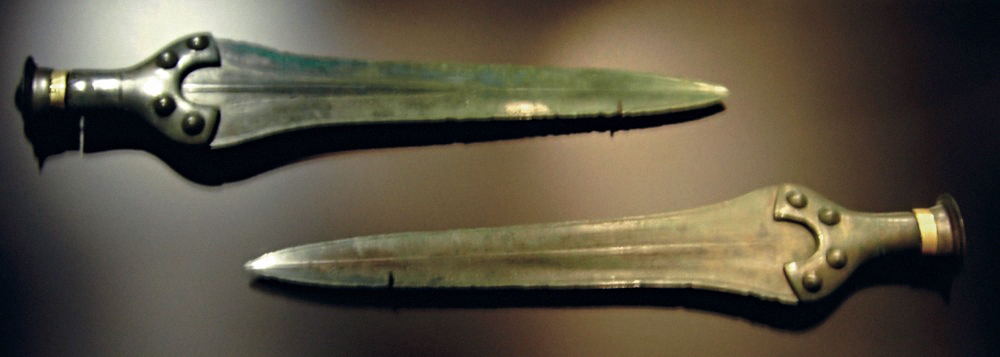
The swords found together with the Nebra sky disk, c. 1600 BC

The first weapons that can be described as "swords" date to around 3300 BC. They have been found in Arslantepe, Turkey, are made from arsenical bronze, and are about 60 cm (24 in) long. Some of them are inlaid with silver.

The sword developed from the knife or dagger. The sword became differentiated from the dagger during the Bronze Age (c. 3000 BC), when copper and bronze weapons were produced with long leaf-shaped blades and with hilts consisting of an extension of the blade in handle form. A knife is unlike a dagger in that a knife has only one cutting surface, while a dagger has two cutting surfaces. Construction of longer blades became possible during the 3rd millennium BC in the Middle East, first in arsenic copper, then in tin-bronze.

Blades longer than 60 cm (24 in) were rare and not practical until the late Bronze Age because the Young's modulus (stiffness) of bronze is relatively low, and consequently longer blades would bend easily. The development of the sword out of the dagger was gradual; the first weapons that can be classified as swords without any ambiguity are those found in Minoan Crete, dated to about 1700 BC, reaching a total length of more than 100 cm (39 in). These are the "type A" swords of the Aegean Bronze Age.

One of the most important, and longest-lasting, types of swords of the European Bronze Age was the Naue II type (named for Julius Naue who first described them), also known as Griffzungenschwert (lit. 'grip-tongue sword'). This type first appears in c. the 13th century BC in Northern Italy (or a general Urnfield background), and survives well into the Iron Age, with a life-span of about seven centuries. During its lifetime, metallurgy changed from bronze to iron, but not its basic design.

Naue II swords were exported from Europe to the Aegean, and as far afield as Ugarit, beginning about 1200 BC, i.e. just a few decades before the final collapse of the palace cultures in the Bronze Age collapse. Naue II swords could be as long as 85 cm (33 in), but most specimens fall into the 60 to 70 cm (24 to 28 in) range. Robert Drews linked the Naue Type II Swords, which spread from Southern Europe into the Mediterranean, with the Bronze Age collapse. Naue II swords, along with Nordic full-hilted swords, were made with functionality and aesthetics in mind. The hilts of these swords were beautifully crafted and often contained false rivets in order to make the sword more visually appealing. Swords coming from northern Denmark and northern Germany usually contained three or more fake rivets in the hilt.

Sword production in China is attested from the Bronze Age Shang dynasty. The technology for bronze swords reached its high point during the Warring States period and Qin dynasty. Amongst the Warring States period swords, some unique technologies were used, such as casting high tin edges over softer, lower tin cores, or the application of diamond shaped patterns on the blade (see sword of Goujian). Also unique for Chinese bronzes is the consistent use of high tin bronze (17–21% tin) which is very hard and breaks if stressed too far, whereas other cultures preferred lower tin bronze (usually 10%), which bends if stressed too far. Although iron swords were made alongside bronze, it was not until the early Han period that iron completely replaced bronze.

In the Indian subcontinent, the earliest available Bronze Age swords of copper were discovered in the Indus Valley civilization sites in the northwestern regions of South Asia. Swords have been recovered in archaeological findings throughout the Ganges-Jamuna Doab region of Indian subcontinent, consisting of bronze but more commonly copper. Diverse specimens have been discovered in Fatehgarh, where there are several varieties of hilt. These swords have been variously dated to times between 1700 and 1400 BC. Other swords from this period in India have been discovered from Kallur, Raichur.

==== Iron Age ====
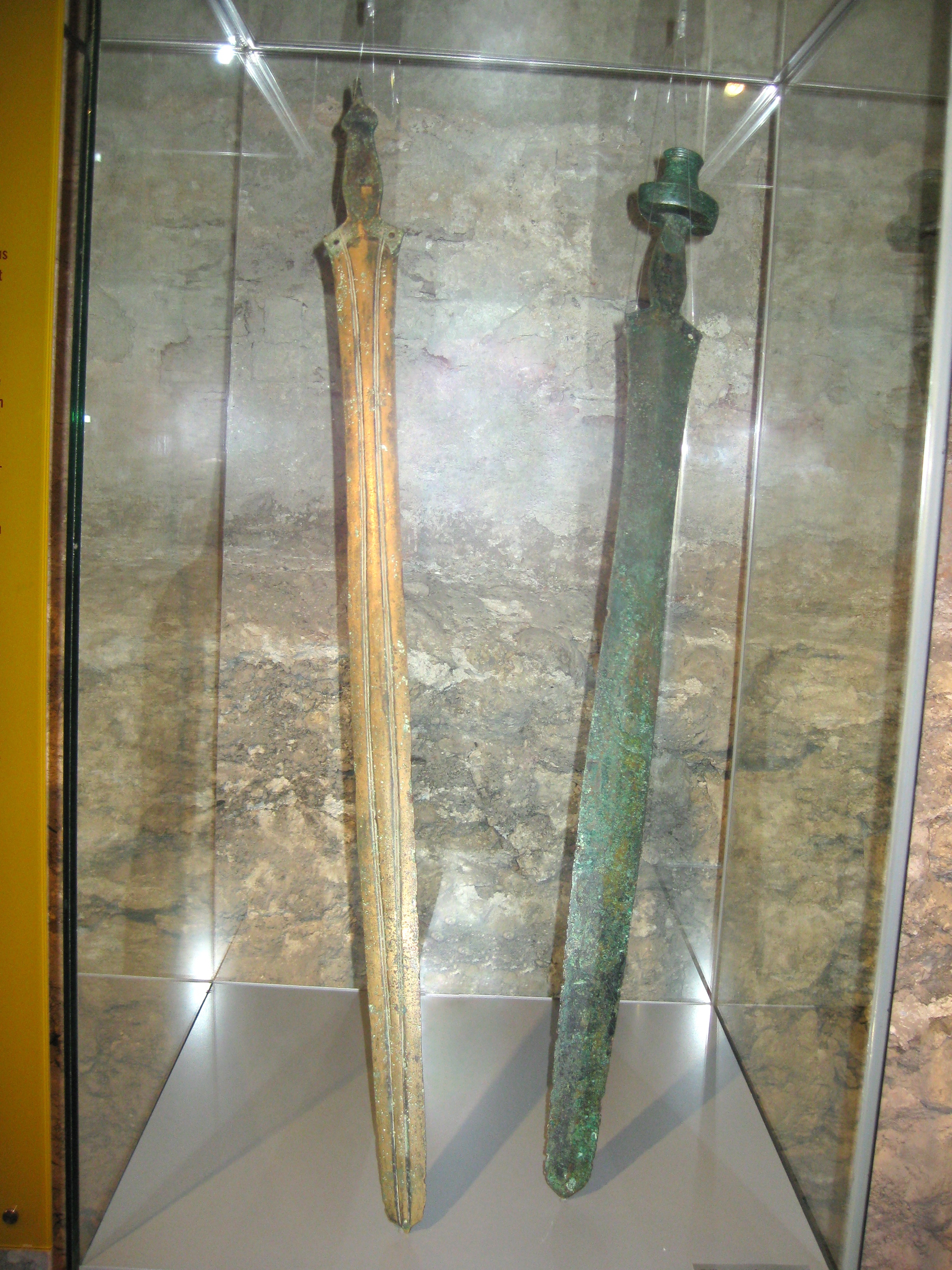
Hallstatt swords

Iron became increasingly common from the 13th century BC. Before that the use of swords was less frequent. The iron was not quench-hardened although often containing sufficient carbon, but work-hardened like bronze by hammering. This made them comparable or only slightly better in terms of strength and hardness to bronze swords. They could still bend during use rather than spring back into shape. But the easier production, and the better availability of the raw material for the first time permitted the equipping of entire armies with metal weapons, though Bronze Age Egyptian armies were sometimes fully equipped with bronze weapons.

Ancient swords are often found at burial sites. The sword was often placed on the right side of the corpse. Many times the sword was kept over the corpse. In many late Iron Age graves, the sword and the scabbard were bent at 180 degrees. It was known as killing the sword. Thus they might have considered swords as the most potent and powerful object.

==== Indian antiquity ====
High-carbon steel for swords, which would later appear as Damascus steel, was likely developed in India around the mid-1st millennium BC. The Periplus of the Erythraean Sea mentions swords of Indian iron and steel being exported from ancient India to ancient Greece. Blades from the Indian subcontinent made of Damascus steel also found their way into Persia.

==== Greco-Roman antiquity ====
By the time of Classical Antiquity and the Parthian and Sassanid Empires in Iran, iron swords were common. The Greek xiphos and the Roman gladius are typical examples of the type, measuring some 60 to 70 cm (24 to 28 in). The late Roman Empire introduced the longer spatha (the term for its wielder, spatharius, became a court rank in Constantinople), and from this time, the term longsword is applied to swords comparatively long for their respective periods.

Swords from the Parthian and Sassanian Empires were quite long, the blades on some late Sassanian swords being just under a metre long.

Swords were also used to administer various physical punishments, such as non-surgical amputation or capital punishment by decapitation. The use of a sword, an honourable weapon, was regarded in Europe since Roman times as a privilege reserved for the nobility and the upper classes.

==== Persian antiquity ====
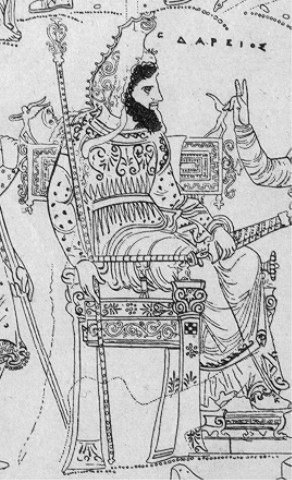
Darius I of Persia holding an acinaces in his lap

In the first millennium BC, the Persian armies used a sword that was originally of Scythian design called the akinaka (acinaces). However, the great conquests of the Persians made the sword more famous as a Persian weapon, to the extent that the true nature of the weapon has been lost somewhat as the name akinaka has been used to refer to whichever form of sword the Persian army favoured at the time.

It is widely believed that the original akinaka was a 35 to 45 cm (14 to 18 in) double-edged sword. The design was not uniform and in fact identification is made more on the nature of the scabbard than the weapon itself; the scabbard usually has a large, decorative mount allowing it to be suspended from a belt on the wearer's right side. Because of this, it is assumed that the sword was intended to be drawn with the blade pointing downwards ready for surprise stabbing attacks.

In the 12th century, the Seljuq dynasty had introduced the curved shamshir to Persia, and this was in extensive use by the early 16th century.

==== Chinese antiquity ====
Chinese iron swords made their first appearance in the later part of the Western Zhou dynasty, but iron and steel swords were not widely used until the 3rd century BC Han dynasty. The Chinese dao (刀 pinyin dāo) is single-edged, sometimes translated as sabre or broadsword, and the jian (劍 or 剑 pinyin jiàn) is double-edged. The zhanmadao (literally "horse chopping sword") is an extremely long, anti-cavalry sword from the Song dynasty era.

=== Middle Ages ===
==== Europe ====
===== Early and High Middle Ages =====
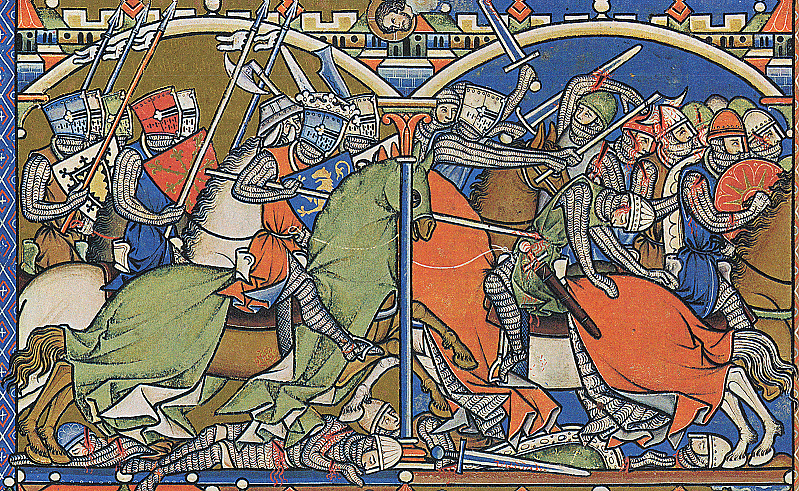
Battle scene from the Morgan Bible of Louis IX showing 13th-century swords

During the Middle Ages, sword technology improved, and the sword became a very advanced weapon. The spatha type remained popular throughout the Migration period and well into the Middle Ages. Vendel Age spathas were decorated with Germanic artwork (not unlike the Germanic bracteates fashioned after Roman coins). The Viking Age saw again a more standardized production, but the basic design remained indebted to the spatha.

Around the 10th century, the use of properly quenched hardened and tempered steel started to become much more common than in previous periods. The Frankish 'Ulfberht' blades (the name of the maker inlaid in the blade) were of particularly consistent high quality. Charles the Bald tried to prohibit the export of these swords, as they were used by Vikings in raids against the Franks.

Wootz steel (which is also known as Damascus steel) was a unique and highly prized steel developed on the Indian subcontinent as early as the 5th century BC. Its properties were unique due to the special smelting and reworking of the steel creating networks of iron carbides described as a globular cementite in a matrix of pearlite. The use of Damascus steel in swords became extremely popular in the 16th and 17th centuries. (Note: "Pattern-Welding and Damascening of Sword-Blades: Part 1 Pattern-Welding" (Maryon 1960) A brief review article by the originator of the term "pattern-welding" accurately details all the salient points of the construction of pattern-welded blades and of how all the patterns observed result as a function of the depth of grinding into a twisted rod structure. The article also includes a brief description of pattern-welding as encountered in the Malay keris. Damascus steel is also known as watered steel.)

It was only from the 11th century that Norman swords began to develop the crossguard (quillons). During the Crusades of the 12th to 13th century, this cruciform type of arming sword remained essentially stable, with variations mainly concerning the shape of the pommel. These swords were designed as cutting weapons, although effective points were becoming common to counter improvements in armour, especially the 14th-century change from mail to plate armour.

a hand and a half sword (bastard sword)

It was during the 14th century, with the growing use of more advanced armour, that the hand and a half sword, also known as a "bastard sword", came into being. It had an extended grip that meant it could be used with either one or two hands. Though these swords did not provide a full two-hand grip they allowed their wielders to hold a shield or parrying dagger in their off hand, or to use it as a two-handed sword for a more powerful blow.

In the Middle Ages, the sword was often used as a symbol of the word of God. The names given to many swords in mythology, literature, and history reflected the high prestige of the weapon and the wealth of the owner.

===== Late Middle Ages =====
From around 1300 to 1500, in concert with improved armour, innovative sword designs evolved more and more rapidly. The main transition was the lengthening of the grip, allowing two-handed use, and a longer blade. By 1400, this type of sword, at the time called langes Schwert (longsword) or spadone, was common, and a number of 15th- and 16th-century Fechtbücher offering instructions on their use survive. Another variant was the specialized armour-piercing swords of the estoc type. The longsword became popular due to its extreme reach and its cutting and thrusting abilities.

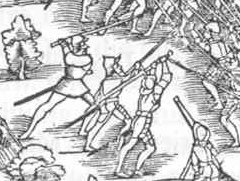
1548 depiction of a zweihänder used against pikes in the Battle of Kappel

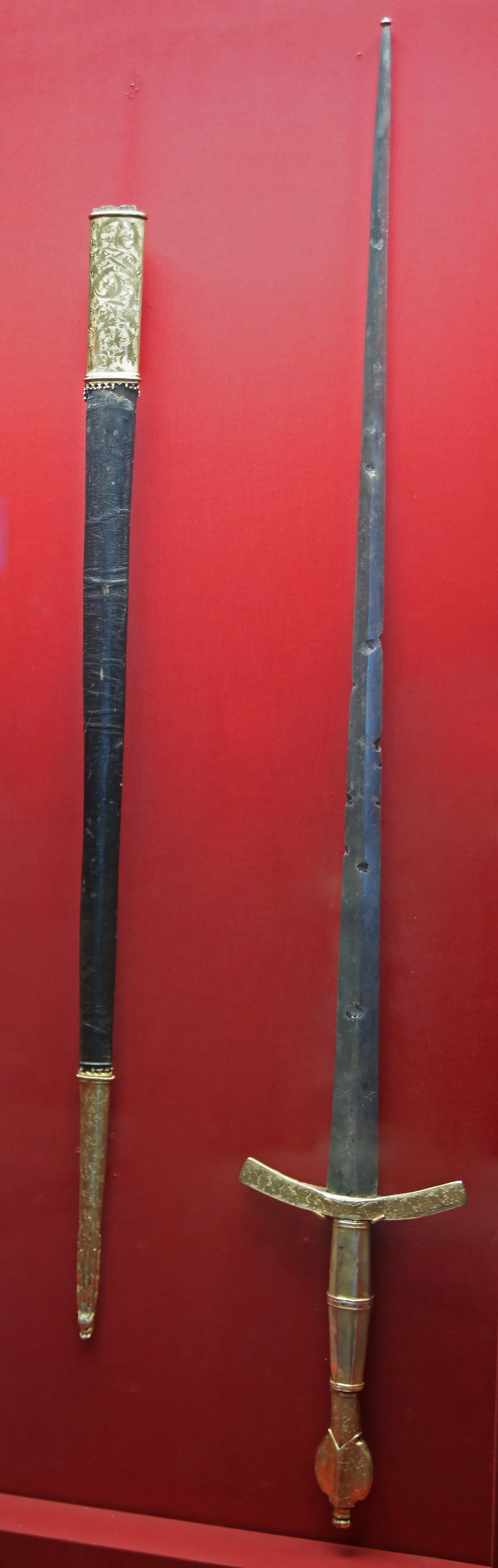
Ceremonial sword of the Rector of the Republic of Dubrovnik (15th century)

The estoc became popular because of its ability to thrust into the gaps between plates of armour. The grip was sometimes wrapped in wire or coarse animal hide to provide a better grip and to make it harder to knock a sword out of the user's hand.

A number of manuscripts covering longsword combat and techniques dating from the 13th–16th centuries exist in German, Italian, and English, providing extensive information on longsword combatives as used throughout this period. Many of these are now readily available online.

In the 16th century, the large zweihänder was used by the elite German and Swiss mercenaries known as doppelsöldners. Zweihänder, literally translated, means two-hander. The zweihänder possesses a long blade, as well as a huge guard for protection. It is estimated that some zweihänder swords were over 6 feet (1.8 m) long, with the one ascribed to Frisian warrior Pier Gerlofs Donia being 7 feet (2.13 m) long. The gigantic blade length was perfectly designed for manipulating and pushing away enemy polearms, which were major weapons around this time, in both Germany and Eastern Europe. Doppelsöldners also used katzbalgers, which means 'cat-gutter'. The katzbalger's S-shaped guard and 2-foot-long (0.61 m) blade made it perfect for bringing in when the fighting became too close to use a zweihänder.

Civilian use of swords became increasingly common during the late Renaissance, with duels being a preferred way to honourably settle disputes.

The side-sword was a type of war sword used by infantry during the Renaissance of Europe. This sword was a direct descendant of the knightly sword. Quite popular between the 16th and 17th centuries, they were ideal for handling the mix of armoured and unarmoured opponents of that time. A new technique of placing one's finger on the ricasso to improve the grip (a practice that would continue in the rapier) led to the production of hilts with a guard for the finger. This sword design eventually led to the development of the civilian rapier, but it was not replaced by it, and the side-sword continued to be used during the rapier's lifetime. As it could be used for both cutting and thrusting, the term "cut and thrust sword" is sometimes used interchangeably with side-sword. As rapiers became more popular, attempts were made to hybridize the blade, sacrificing the effectiveness found in each unique weapon design. These are still considered side-swords and are sometimes labeled sword rapier or cutting rapier by modern collectors.

Side-swords used in conjunction with bucklers became so popular that it caused the term swashbuckler to be coined. This word stems from the new fighting style of the side-sword and buckler which was filled with much "swashing and making a noise on the buckler".

Within the Ottoman Empire, the use of a curved sabre called the yatagan started in the mid-16th century. It would become the weapon of choice for many in Turkey and the Balkans.

The sword in this time period was the most personal weapon, the most prestigious, and the most versatile for close combat, but it came to decline in military use as technology, such as the crossbow and firearms changed warfare. However, it maintained a key role in civilian self-defence.

==== Middle East ====
The earliest evidence of curved swords, or scimitars (and other regional variants as the Arabian saif, the Persian shamshir and the Turkic kilij) is from the 9th century, when it was used among soldiers in the Khurasan region of Persia.

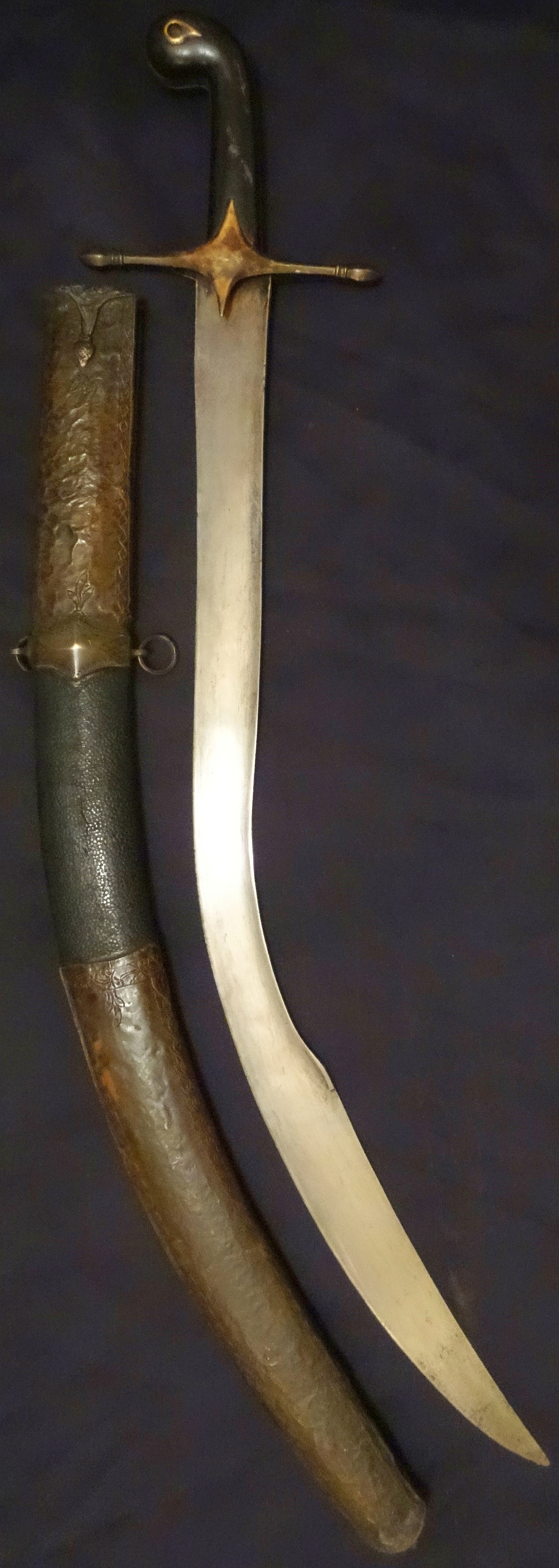
Kilij

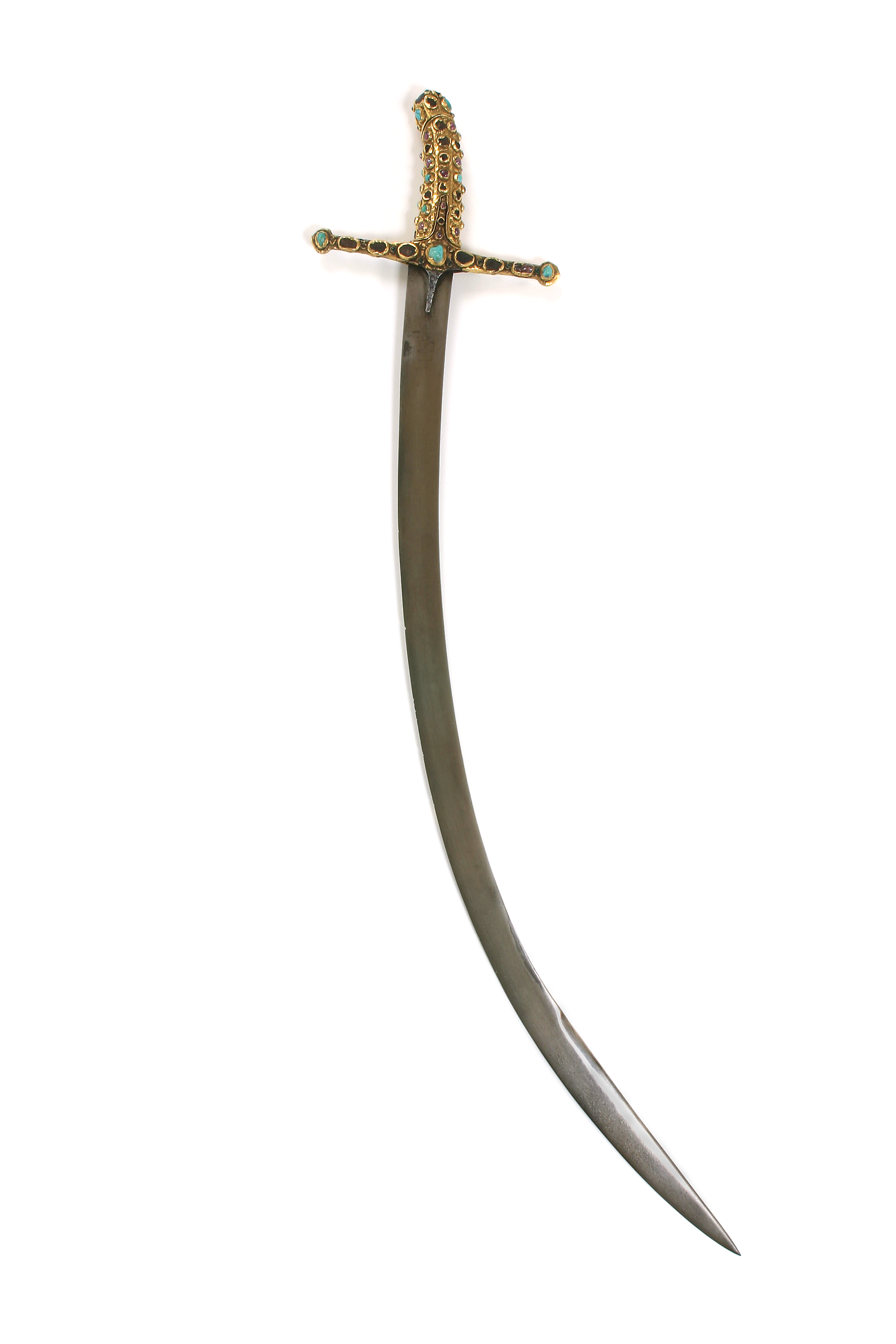
Shamshir

==== Africa ====
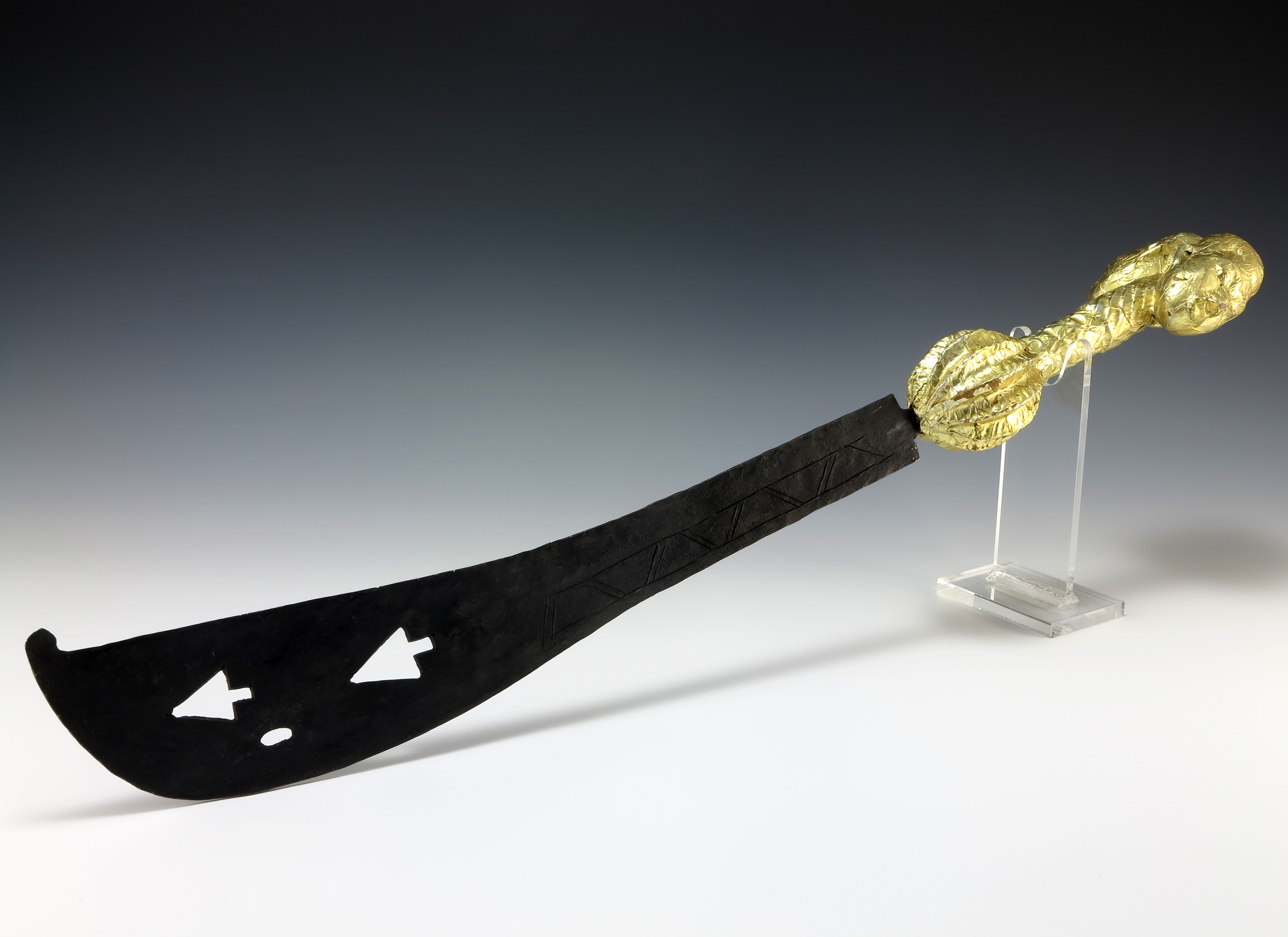
20th-century akrafena

The takoba is a type of broadsword originating in the western Sahel, descended from various Byzantine and Islamic swords. It has a straight double-edged blade measuring about one meter in length, usually imported from Europe.

Abyssinian swords related to the Persian shamshir are known as shotel. The Asante people adopted swords under the name of akrafena. They are still used today in ceremonies, such as the Odwira festival.

==== East Asia ====
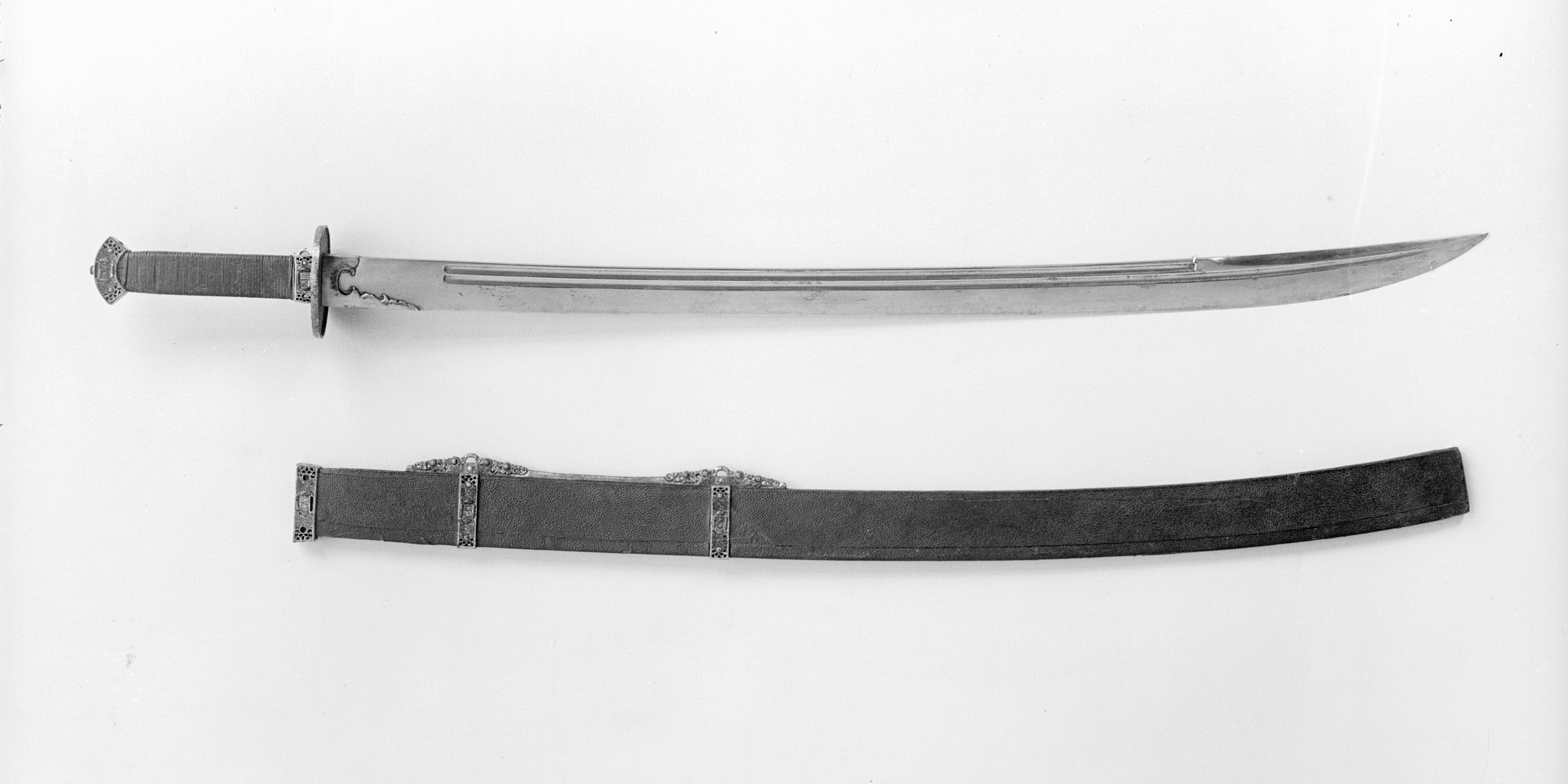
Chinese dao and scabbard of the 17th–18th century

As steel technology improved, single-edged weapons became popular throughout Asia. Derived from the Chinese jian or dao, the Korean hwandudaedo are known from the early medieval Three Kingdoms. Production of the Japanese tachi, a precursor to the katana, is recorded from c. AD 900 (see Japanese sword).

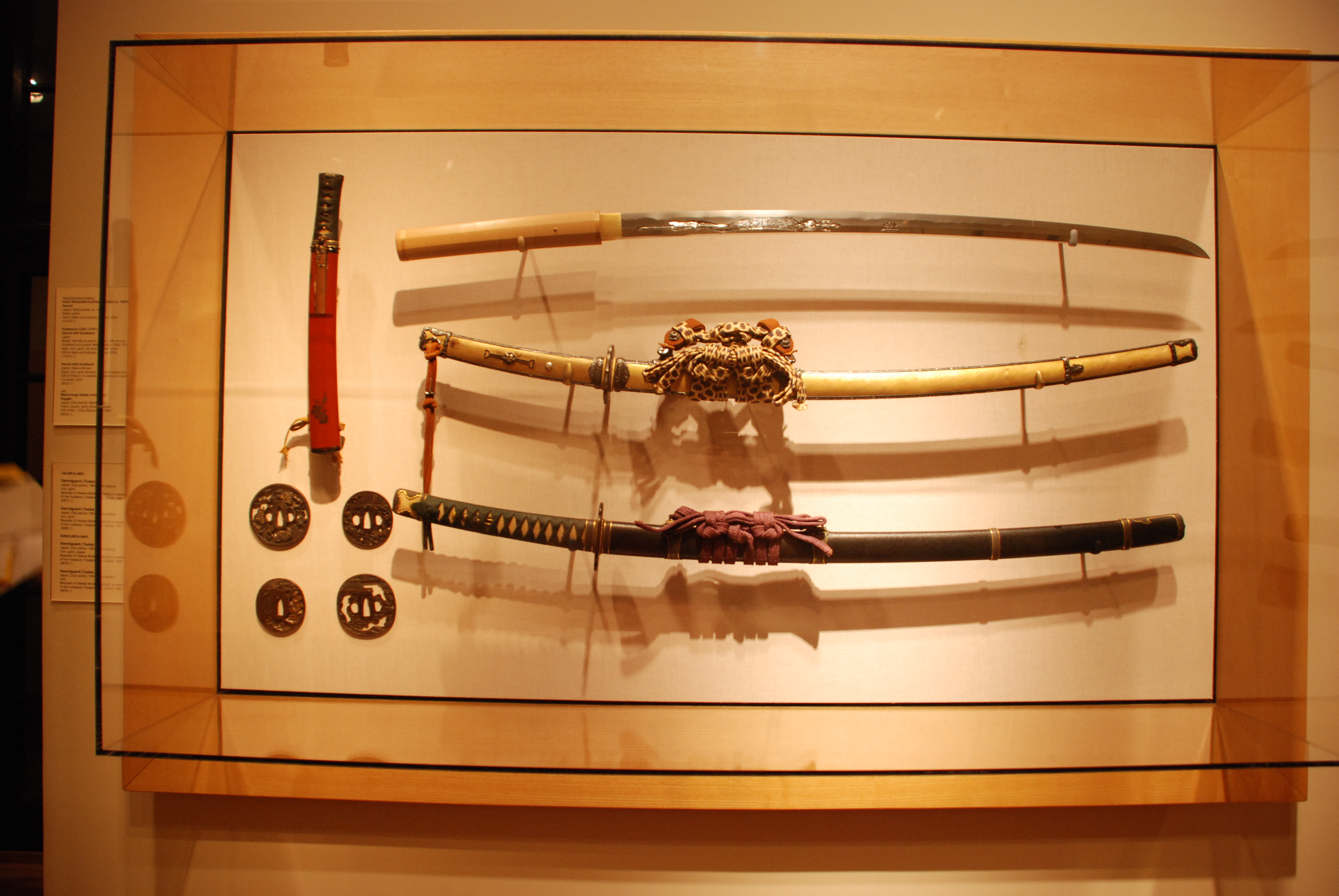
Japanese swords: tachi (right), wakizashi (top left), and tsuba guards (bottom left)

Japan was famous for the swords it forged in the early 13th century for the class of warrior-nobility known as the Samurai. Western historians have said that Japanese katana were among the finest cutting weapons in world military history. The types of swords used by the Samurai included the ōdachi (extra long field sword), tachi (long cavalry sword), katana (long sword), and wakizashi (shorter companion sword for katana). Japanese swords that pre-date the rise of the samurai caste include the tsurugi (straight double-edged blade) and chokutō (straight one-edged blade). Japanese swordmaking reached the height of its development in the 15th and 16th centuries, when samurai increasingly found a need for a sword to use in closer quarters, leading to the creation of the modern katana. High quality Japanese swords have been exported to neighboring Asian countries since before the 11th century. From the 15th century to the 16th century, more than 200,000 swords were exported, reaching a quantitative peak, but these were simple swords made exclusively for mass production, specialized for export and lending to conscripted farmers (ashigaru).

==== South Asia ====
The khanda is a double-edge straight sword. It is often featured in religious iconography, theatre and art depicting the ancient history of India. Some communities venerate the weapon as a symbol of Shiva. It is a common weapon in the martial arts in the Indian subcontinent. The khanda often appears in Hindu, Buddhist and Sikh scriptures and art. In Sri Lanka, a unique wind furnace was used to produce the high-quality steel. This gave the blade a very hard cutting edge and beautiful patterns. For these reasons it became a very popular trading material.

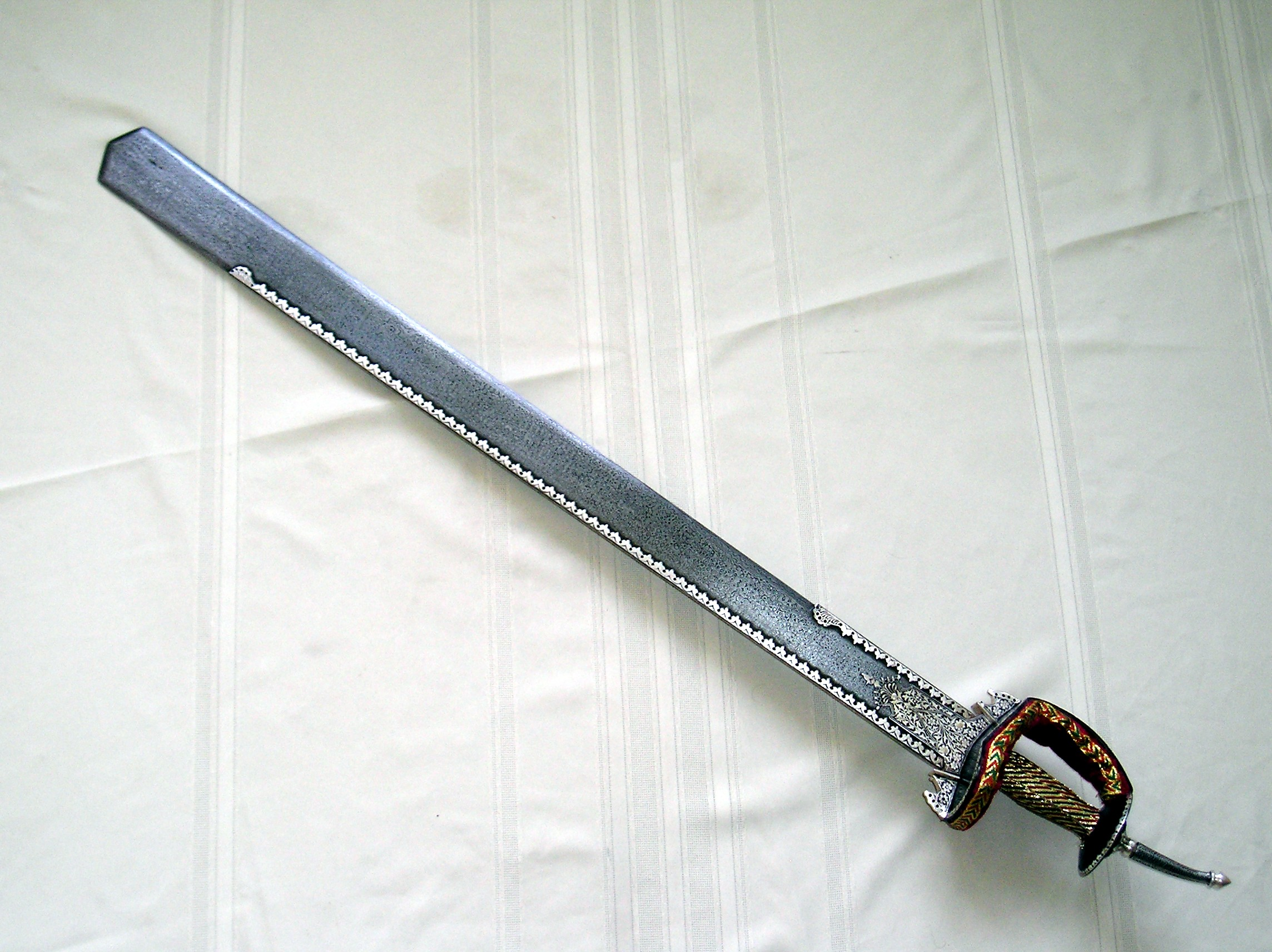
A khanda sword from India

The firangi (/fəˈrɪŋɡiː/, derived from the Arabic term for a Western European, a "Frank") was a sword type which used blades manufactured in Western Europe and imported by the Portuguese, or made locally in imitation of European blades. Because of its length the firangi is usually regarded as primarily a cavalry weapon. The sword has been especially associated with the Marathas, who were famed for their cavalry. However, the firangi was also widely used by Sikhs and Rajputs.

The talwar (Hindi: तलवार) is a type of curved sword from India and other countries of the Indian subcontinent, it was adopted by communities such as Rajputs, Sikhs and Marathas, who favored the sword as their main weapon. It became more widespread in the medieval era.

The urumi (Tamil: சுருள் பட்டாக்கத்தி surul pattai, lit. curling blade; Sinhala: එතුණු කඩුව ethunu kaduwa; Hindi: aara) is a "sword" with a flexible whip-like blade.

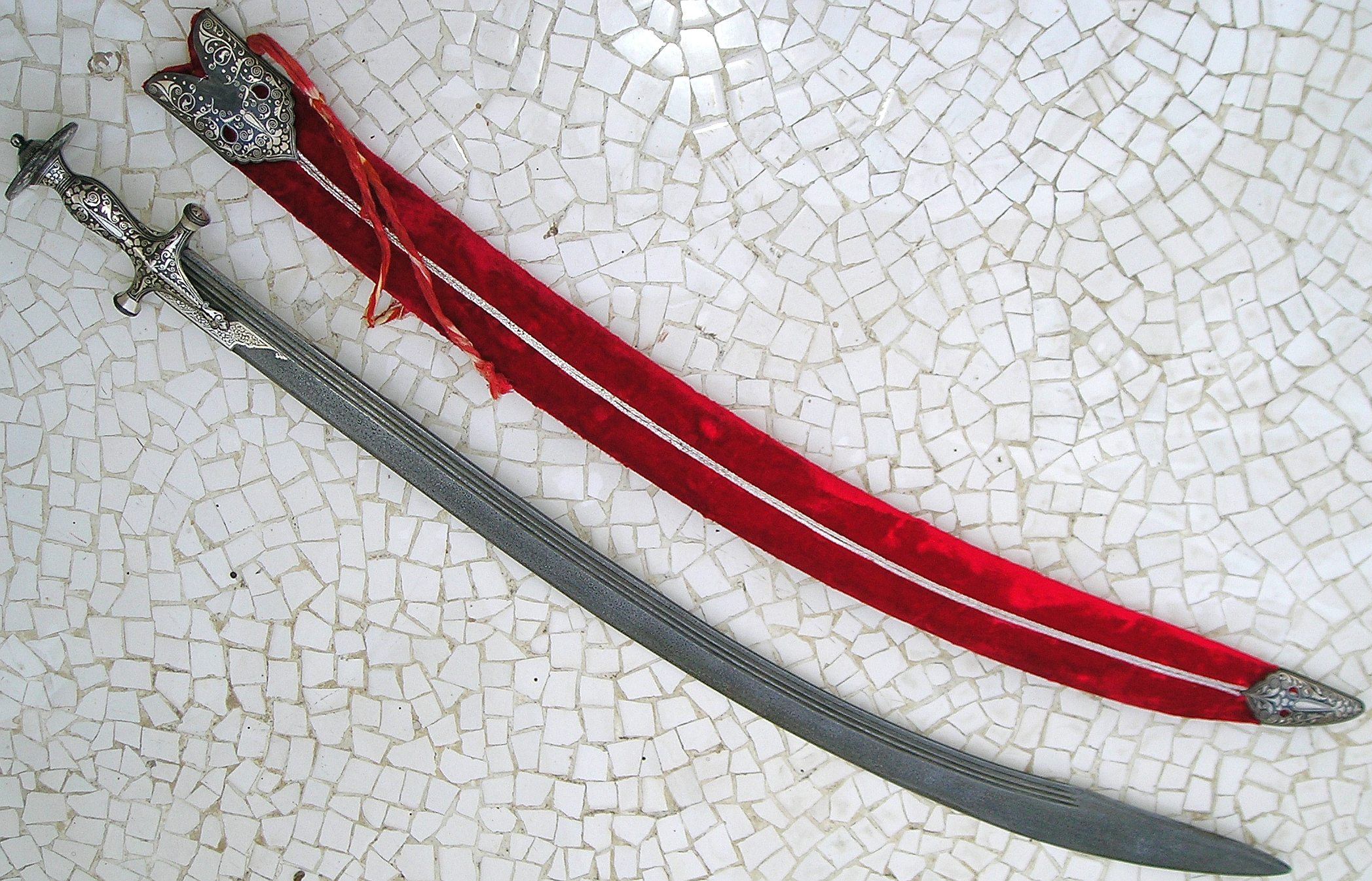
Talwar

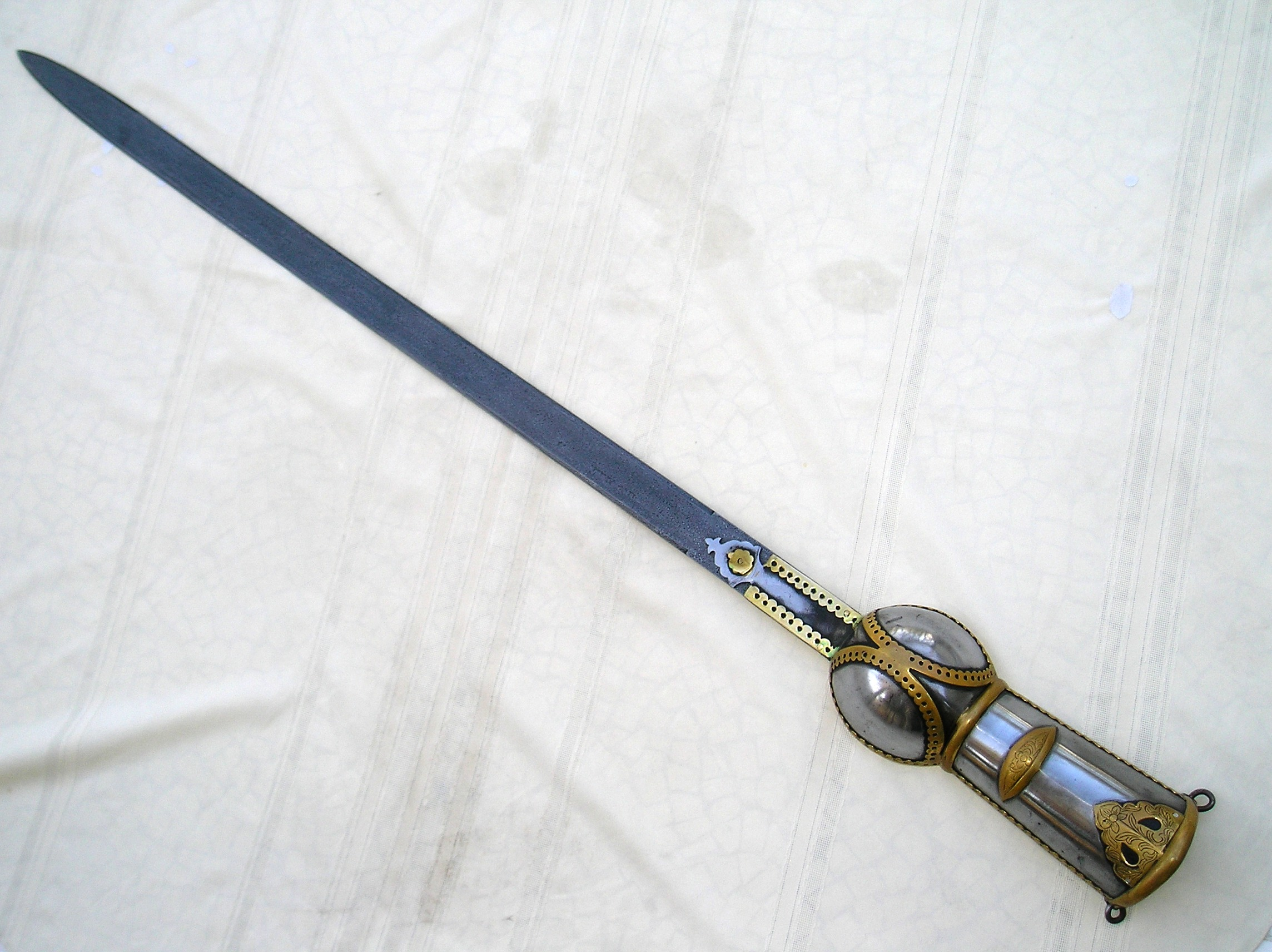
Pata

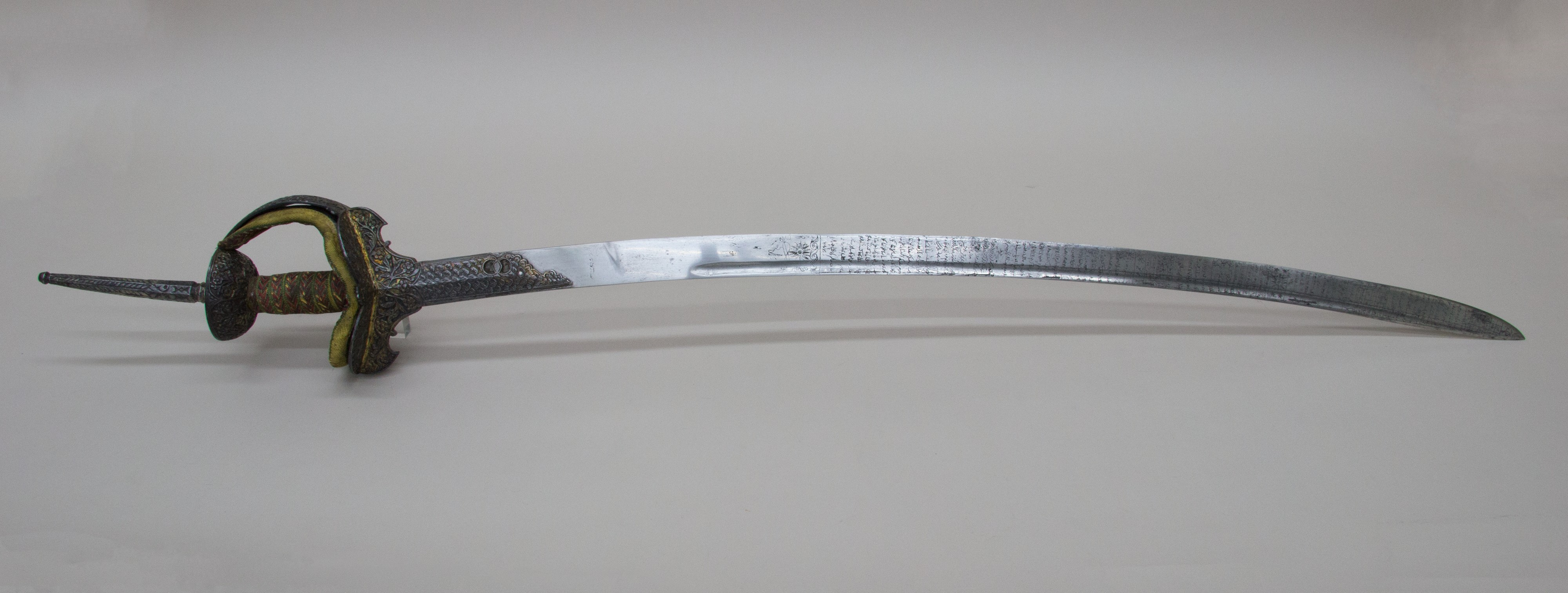
Firangi

==== Southeast Asia ====
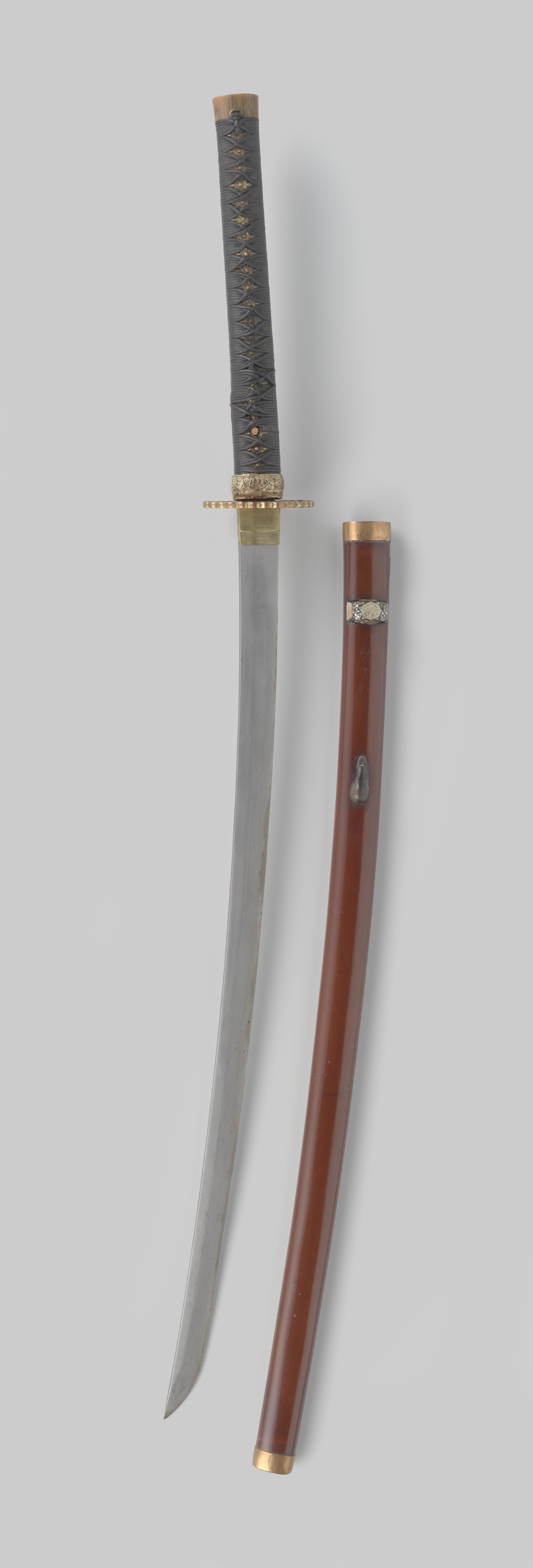
Vietnamese gươm of the 17th century

In Indonesia, the images of Indian style swords can be found in Hindu gods statues from ancient Java circa 8th to 10th century. However the native types of blade known as kris, parang, klewang and golok were more popular as weapons. These daggers are shorter than a sword but longer than a common dagger.

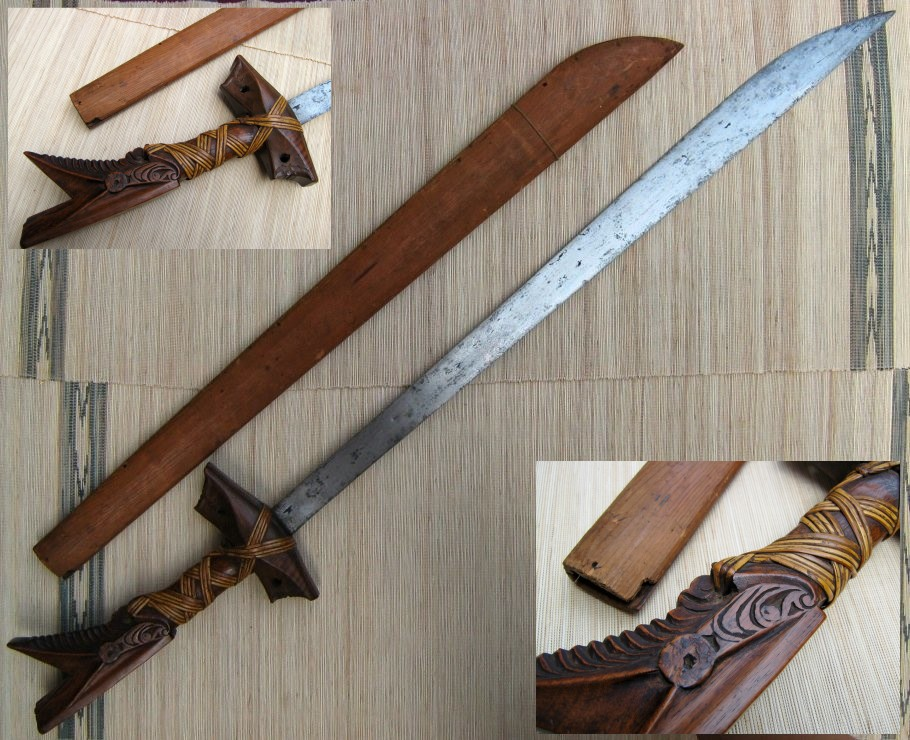
Kampilan from the Philippines. The traditional design of the hilt is a notable depiction from Philippine mythology.

In the Philippines, traditional large swords known as kampilans and panabas were used in combat by the natives. A notable wielder of the kampilan was Lapu-Lapu, the king of Mactan and his warriors who defeated the Spaniards and killed Portuguese explorer Ferdinand Magellan at the Battle of Mactan on 27 April 1521. Traditional swords in the Philippines were immediately banned, but the training in swordsmanship was later hidden from the occupying Spaniards by practices in dances. But because of the banning, Filipinos were forced to use swords that were disguised as farm tools. Bolos and baliswords were used during the revolutions against the colonialists not only because ammunition for guns was scarce, but also for concealability while walking in crowded streets and homes. Bolos were also used by young boys who joined their parents in the revolution and by young girls and their mothers in defending the town while the men were on the battlefields. During the Philippine–American War in events such as the Battle of Balangiga, most of an American company was hacked to death or seriously injured by bolo-wielding guerillas in Balangiga, Samar. When the Japanese took control of the country, several American special operations groups stationed in the Philippines were introduced to Filipino martial arts and swordsmanship, leading to this style reaching America despite the fact that natives were reluctant to allow outsiders in on their fighting secrets.

==== Pre-Columbian Americas ====
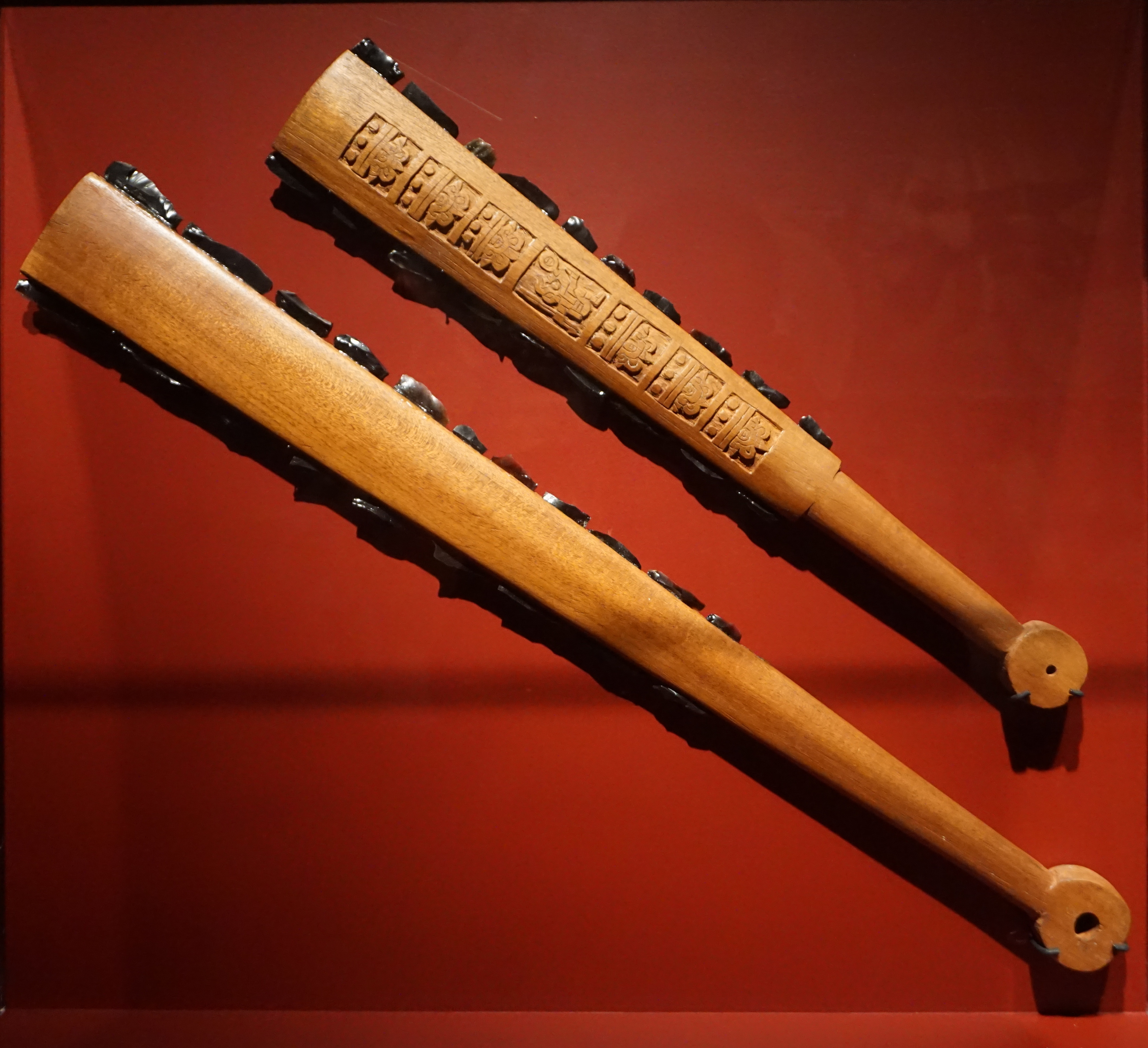
A macuahuitl broadsword from Mesoamerica

The macuahuitl is a wooden broadsword and club that was utilized by various Mesoamerican civilizations, such as those of the Aztecs, Maya, Olmecs, Toltecs, and Mixtecs.

==== Pacific Islands ====
In the Gilbert Islands, the native Kiribati people have developed a type of broadsword made from shark teeth, which serves a similar function to the leiomano used by the Native Hawaiians.

=== Early modern history ===
==== Military sword ====
A single-edged type of sidearm used by the Hussites was popularized in 16th-century Germany under its Czech name dusack, also known as Säbel auf Teutsch gefasst ("sabre fitted in the German manner"). A closely related weapon is the schnepf or Swiss sabre used in Early Modern Switzerland.

The cut-and-thrust mortuary sword was used after 1625 by cavalry during the English Civil War. This (usually) two-edged sword sported a half-basket hilt with a straight blade some 90–105 cm long. Later in the 17th century, the swords used by cavalry became predominantly single-edged. The so-called walloon sword (épée wallone) was common in the Thirty Years' War and Baroque era. Its hilt was ambidextrous with shell-guards and knuckle-bow that inspired 18th-century continental hunting hangers. Following their campaign in the Netherlands in 1672, the French began producing this weapon as their first regulation sword. Weapons of this design were also issued to the Swedish army from the time of Gustavus Adolphus until as late as the 1850s.

==== Duelling sword ====
The rapier is believed to have evolved either from the Spanish espada ropera or from the swords of the Italian nobility somewhere in the later part of the 16th century. The rapier differed from most earlier swords in that it was not a military weapon but a primarily civilian sword. Both the rapier and the Italian schiavona developed the crossguard into a basket-shaped guard for hand protection.

During the 17th and 18th centuries, the shorter small sword became an essential fashion accessory in European countries and the New World, though in some places such as the Scottish Highlands large swords as the basket-hilted broadsword were preferred, and most wealthy men and military officers carried one slung from a belt. Both the small sword and the rapier remained popular dueling swords well into the 18th century.

As the wearing of swords fell out of fashion, canes took their place in a gentleman's wardrobe. This developed to the gentlemen in the Victorian era to use the umbrella. Some examples of canes—those known as sword canes or swordsticks—incorporate a concealed blade. The French martial art la canne developed to fight with canes and swordsticks and has now evolved into a sport. The English martial art singlestick is very similar. With the rise of the pistol duel, the duelling sword fell out of fashion long before the practice of duelling itself. By about 1770, English duelists enthusiastically adopted the pistol, and sword duels dwindled. However, the custom of duelling with epées persisted well into the 20th century in France. Such modern duels were not fought to the death; the duellists' aim was instead merely to draw blood from the opponent's sword arm.

=== Late modern history ===
==== Military sidearm ====
Towards the end of its useful life, the sword served more as a weapon of self-defense than for use on the battlefield, and the military importance of swords steadily decreased during the Modern Age. Even as a personal sidearm, the sword began to lose its preeminence in the early 19th century, reflecting the development of reliable handguns.

However, swords were still normally carried in combat by cavalrymen and by officers of other branches throughout the 19th and early 20th centuries, both in colonial and European warfare. For example, during the Aceh War the Acehnese klewangs, a sword similar to the machete, proved very effective in close quarters combat with Dutch troops, leading the Royal Netherlands East Indies Army to adopt a heavy cutlass, also called klewang (very similar in appearance to the US Navy Model 1917 Cutlass) to counter it. Mobile troops armed with carbines and klewangs succeeded in suppressing Aceh resistance where traditional infantry with rifle and bayonet had failed. From that time on until the 1950s the Royal Dutch East Indies Army, Royal Dutch Army, Royal Dutch Navy and Dutch police used these cutlasses called Klewang.

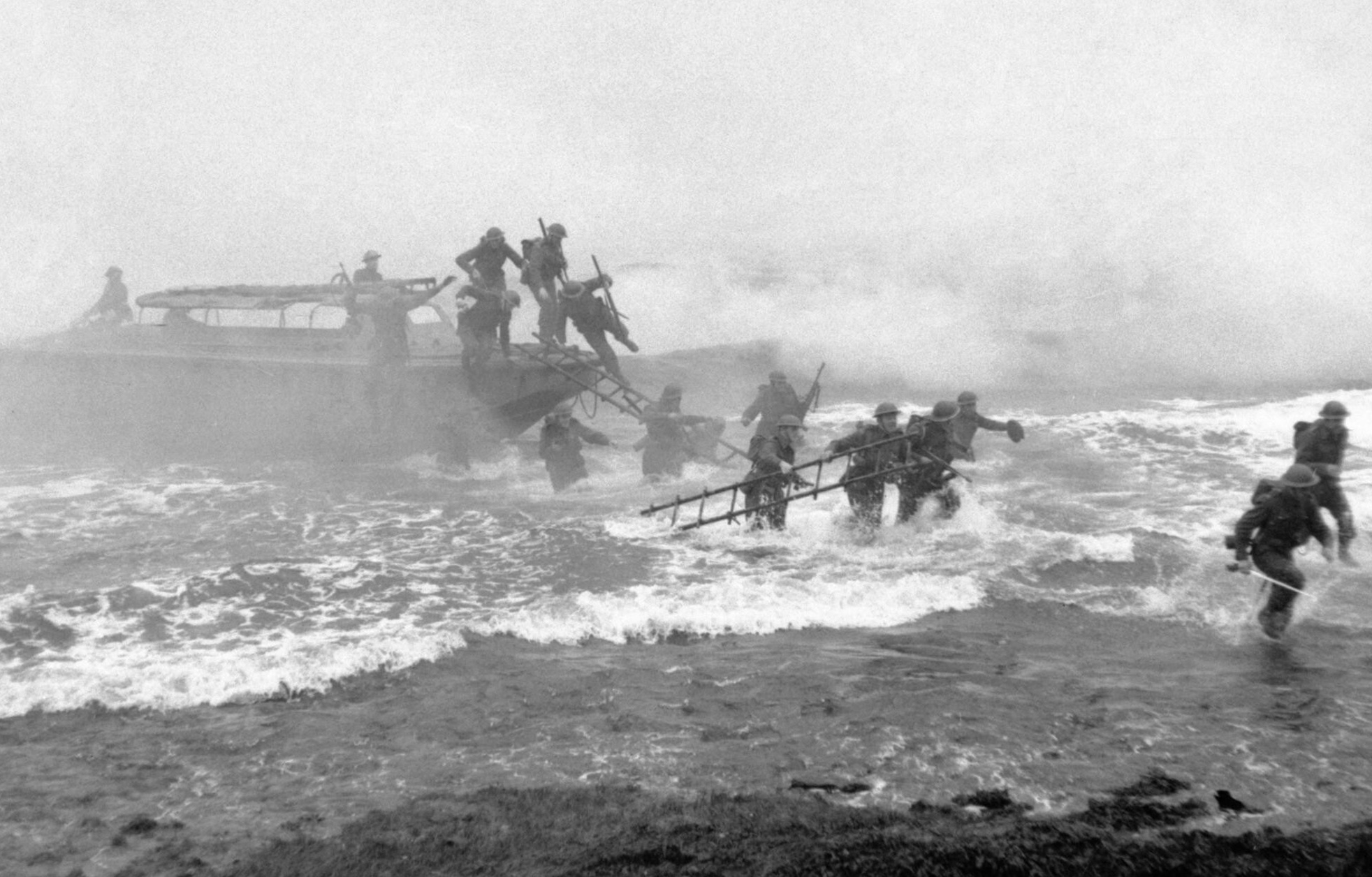
British Major Jack Churchill (far right) leads commandos during a training exercise, sword in hand, in World War II.

Swords continued in general peacetime use by cavalry of most armies during the years prior to World War I. The British Army formally adopted a completely new design of cavalry sword in 1908, almost the last change in British Army weapons before the outbreak of the war. At the outbreak of World War I infantry officers in all combatant armies then involved (French, German, British, Austro-Hungarian, Russian, Belgian and Serbian) still carried swords as part of their field equipment. On mobilization in August 1914 all serving British Army officers were required to have their swords sharpened as the only peacetime use of the weapon had been for saluting on parade. The high visibility and limited practical use of the sword however led to it being abandoned within weeks, although most cavalry continued to carry sabres throughout the war. While retained as a symbol of rank and status by at least senior officers of infantry, artillery and other branches, the sword was usually left with non-essential baggage when units reached the front line. It was not until the late 1920s and early 1930s that this historic weapon was finally discarded for all but ceremonial purposes by most remaining horse mounted regiments of Europe and the Americas.

In China troops used the long anti-cavalry miao dao well into the Second Sino-Japanese War. The last units of British heavy cavalry switched to using armoured vehicles as late as 1938. Swords and other dedicated melee weapons were used occasionally by many countries during World War II, but typically as a secondary weapon as they were outclassed by coexisting firearms. A notable exception was the Imperial Japanese Army where, for cultural reasons, all officers and warrant officers carried the shin-gunto ("new military sword") into battle from 1934 until 1945.

==== Ceremonial use ====
Swords are commonly worn as a ceremonial item by officers in many military and naval services throughout the world. Occasions to wear swords include any event in dress uniforms where the rank-and-file carry arms: parades, reviews, courts-martial, tattoos, and changes of command. They are also commonly worn for officers' weddings, and when wearing dress uniforms to church—although they are rarely actually worn in the church itself.

In the British forces, swords are also worn for any appearance at Court. In the United States, some Navy and Marine officers are required to own a sword, which can be prescribed for any formal outdoor ceremonial occasion. They are also worn by Non-Commissioned Officers in some circumstances.

===== Civilian officials and police =====
During the 19th and early 20th centuries certain categories of non-military officials wore swords as symbols of authority or status. Most commonly seen were those of various police forces (notably in Imperial Germany, France and other European states). Seldom effective as weapons these were eventually replaced by batons or hand guns.

Until the 20th century light epees were commonly worn as part of the ceremonial civil uniforms prescribed for diplomats, government ministers and senior colonial administrators on formal occasions.

===== Religious =====
In the occult practices of Wicca, a sword or knife often referred to as an athame is used as a magical tool.

==== Sword replicas ====
The production of replicas of historical swords originates with 19th-century historicism. Contemporary replicas can range from cheap factory produced look-alikes to exact recreations of individual artifacts, including an approximation of the historical production methods.

Some kinds of swords are still commonly used today as weapons, often as a side arm for military infantry. The Japanese katana, wakizashi and tantō are carried by some infantry and officers in Japan and other parts of Asia and the kukri is the official melee weapon for Nepal. Other swords in use today are the sabre, the scimitar, the shortsword and the machete.

- In the case of a rat-tail tang, the maker welds a thin rod to the end of the blade at the crossguard; this rod goes through the grip.
- In traditional construction, Swordsmiths peened such tangs over the end of the pommel, or occasionally welded the hilt furniture to the tang and threaded the end for screwing on a pommel. This style is often referred to as a "narrow" or "hidden" tang. Modern, less traditional, replicas often feature a threaded pommel or a pommel nut which holds the hilt together and allows dismantling.
- In a "full" tang (most commonly used in knives and machetes), the tang has about the same width as the blade, and is generally the same shape as the grip.

== Morphology ==
The sword consists of the blade and the hilt. The term scabbard applies to the cover for the sword blade when not in use.

=== Blade ===
Parts of a sword

There is considerable variation in the detailed design of sword blades. The diagram opposite shows a typical Medieval European sword.

Early iron blades have rounded points due to the limited metallurgy of the time. These were still effective for thrusting against lightly armoured opponents. As armour advanced, blades were made narrower, stiffer and sharply pointed to defeat the armour by thrusting.

Dedicated cutting blades are wide and thin, and often have grooves known as fullers which lighten the blade at the cost of some of the blade's stiffness. The edges of a cutting sword are almost parallel. Blades oriented for the thrust have thicker blades, sometimes with a distinct midrib for increased stiffness, with a strong taper and an acute point. The geometry of a cutting sword blade allows for acute edge angles. An edge with an acuter angle is more inclined to degrade quickly in combat situations than an edge with a more obtuse angle. Also, an acute edge angle is not the primary factor of a blade's sharpness.

The part of the blade between the center of percussion (CoP) and the point is called the foible (weak) of the blade, and that between the center of balance (CoB) and the hilt is the forte (strong). The section in between the CoP and the CoB is the middle.

The ricasso or shoulder identifies a short section of blade immediately below the guard that is left completely unsharpened. Many swords have no ricasso. On some large weapons, such as the German Zweihänder, a metal cover surrounded the ricasso, and a swordsman might grip it in one hand to wield the weapon more easily in close-quarter combat. The ricasso normally bears the maker's mark.

The tang is the extension of the blade to which the hilt is fitted.

On Japanese blades, the maker's mark appears on the tang under the grip.

=== Hilt ===
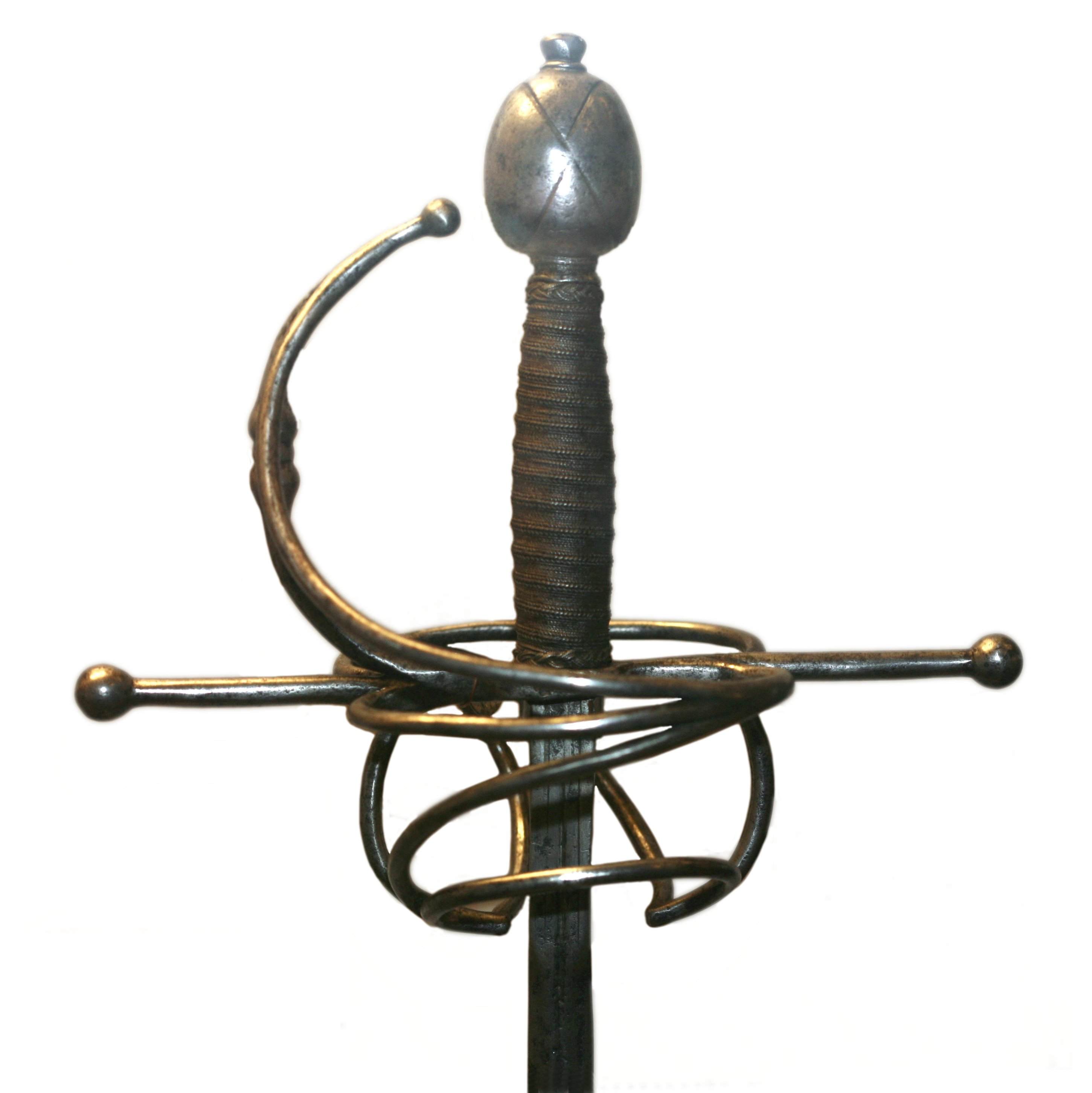
The hilt of a rapier—in this case, with a swept hilt

The hilt is the collective term for the parts allowing for the handling and control of the blade; these consist of the grip, the pommel, and a simple or elaborate guard, which in post-Viking Age swords could consist of only a crossguard (called a cruciform hilt or quillons). The pommel was originally designed as a stop to prevent the sword slipping from the hand. From around the 11th century onward it became a counterbalance to the blade, allowing a more fluid style of fighting. It can also be used as a blunt instrument at close range, and its weight affects the centre of percussion. In later times a sword knot or tassel was sometimes added. By the 17th century, with the growing use of firearms and the accompanying decline in the use of armour, many rapiers and dueling swords had developed elaborate basket hilts, which protect the palm of the wielder and rendered the gauntlet obsolete. By contrast, Japanese swords of the early modern period customarily used a small disc guard, or tsuba.

In late medieval and Renaissance era European swords, a flap of leather called the chappe or rain guard was attached to a sword's crossguard at the base of the hilt to protect the mouth of the scabbard and prevent water from entering.

=== Sword scabbards and suspension ===
Common accessories to the sword include the scabbard and baldric, known as a 'sword belt'.

- The scabbard, also known as the sheath, is a protective cover often provided for the sword blade. Scabbards have been made of many materials, including leather, wood, and metals such as brass or steel. The metal fitting where the blade enters the leather or metal scabbard is called the throat, which is often part of a larger scabbard mount, or locket, that bears a carrying ring or stud to facilitate wearing the sword. The blade's point in leather scabbards is usually protected by a metal tip, or chape, which on both leather and metal scabbards is often given further protection from wear by an extension called a drag, or shoe.
- A sword belt is a belt with an attachment for the sword's scabbard, used to carry it when not in use. It is usually fixed to the scabbard of the sword, providing a fast means of drawing the sword in battle. Examples of sword belts include the Balteus used by the Roman legionary. Swords and sword belts continue in use for ceremonial occasions by military forces.

== Typology ==
Sword typology is based on morphological criteria on the one hand (blade shape (cross-section, taper, and length), shape and size of the hilt and pommel), and age and place of origin on the other (Bronze Age, Iron Age, European (medieval, early modern, modern), Asian).

The relatively comprehensive Oakeshott typology was created by historian and illustrator Ewart Oakeshott as a way to define and catalogue European swords of the medieval period based on physical form, including blade shape and hilt configuration. The typology also focuses on the smaller, and in some cases contemporary, single-handed swords such as the arming sword.

=== Single vs. double-edged ===
As noted above, the terms longsword, broad sword, great sword, and Gaelic claymore are used relative to the era under consideration, and each term designates a particular type of sword.

==== Jian ====
In most Asian countries, a sword (jian 劍, geom (검), ken/tsurugi (剣) is a double-edged straight-bladed weapon, while a knife or sabre (dāo 刀, do (도), to/katana (刀) refers to a single-edged object.

==== Kirpan ====
Among the Sikhs, the sword is held in very high esteem. A single-edged sword is called a kirpan, and its double-edged counterpart a khanda or tegha.

==== Churika ====
The South Indian churika is a handheld double-edged sword traditionally used in the Malabar region of Kerala. It is also worshipped as the weapon of Vettakkorumakan, the hunter god in Hinduism.

==== Backsword and falchion ====
European terminology does give generic names for single-edged and double-edged blades but refers to specific types with the term 'sword' covering them all. For example, the backsword may be so called because it is single-edged but the falchion which is also single-edged is given its own specific name.

=== Single vs. two-handed use ===
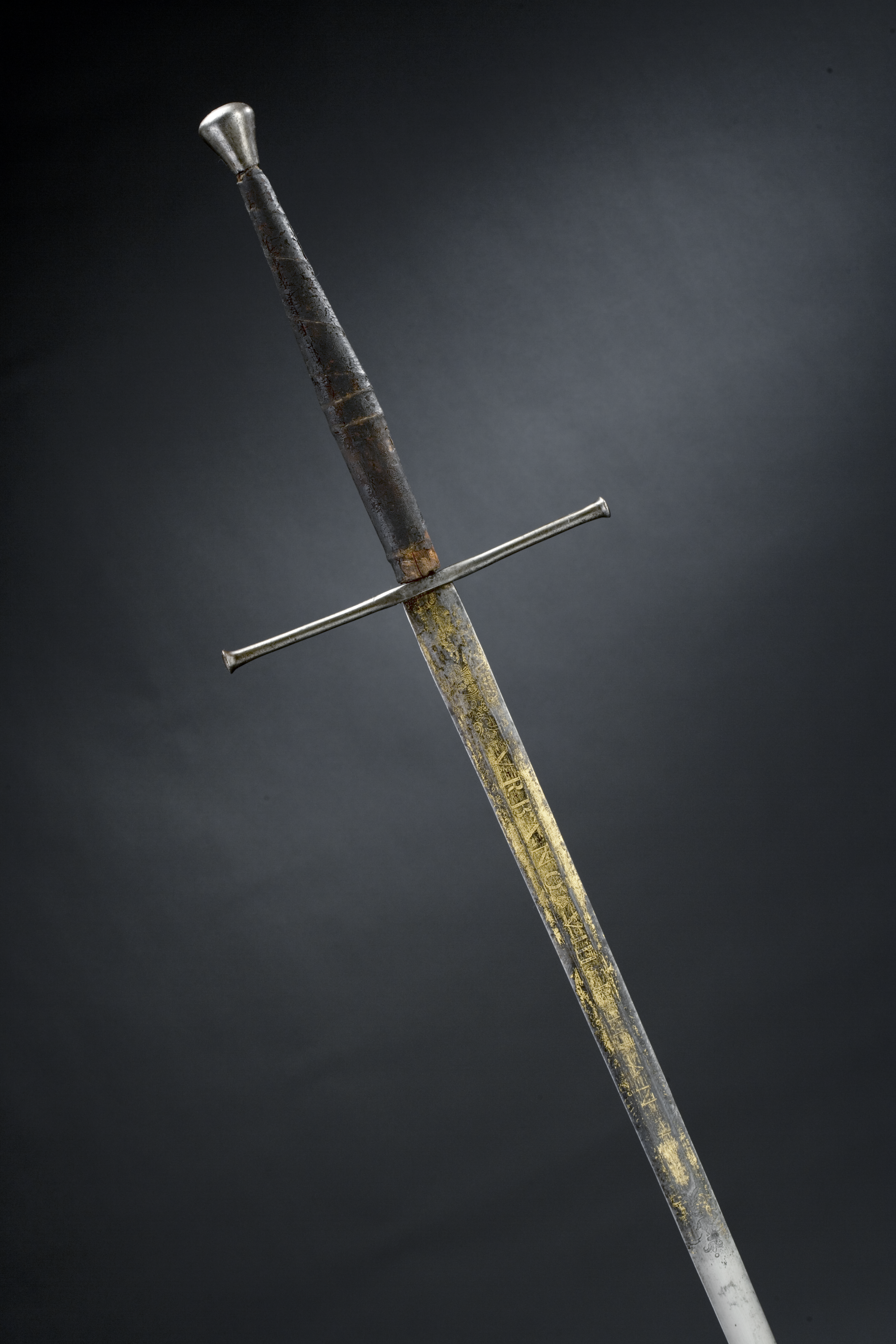
Two-handed sword, Italy, c. 1623

==== Two-handed ====
A two-handed sword is any sword that usually requires two hands to wield, or more specifically the very large swords of the 16th century.

Throughout history two-handed swords have generally been less common than their one-handed counterparts, one exception being their common use in Japan. Two-handed grips have two advantages: obviously they allow the strength of two hands to be used, not just one, but by spacing the hands apart they also allow a torque to be applied, rotating the sword in a slashing manner.

A two-handed grip may be needed for one of two reasons: either to wield a particularly large sword or else with the single-sided Japanese tachi for a slashing cut. Slashing swords may have distinctively long hilt grips to facilitate this.

==== Hand and a half sword ====
A hand and a half sword, colloquially known as a "bastard sword", was a sword with an extended grip and sometimes pommel so that it could be used with either one or two hands. Although these swords may not provide a full two-hand grip, they allowed its wielders to hold a shield or parrying dagger in their off hand, or to use it as a two-handed sword for a more powerful blow. These should not be confused with a longsword, two-handed sword, or Zweihänder, which were always intended to be used with two hands.

== Laws on carrying a sword ==
Two arms holding swords in the coat of arms of North Karelia

The Visigothic Code of Ervig (680-687) made ownership of a sword mandatory for men joining the Visigothic army, regardless of whether the men were Goth or Roman. A number of Charlemagne capitularies made ownership of a sword mandatory, for example, those who owned a warhorse needed to also own a sword.

== In fiction ==
In fantasy, magic swords often appear, based on their use in myth and legend. The science fiction counterpart to these is known as an energy sword (sometimes also referred to as a "beam sword" or "laser sword"), a sword whose blade consists of, or is augmented by, concentrated energy. A well known example of this type of sword is the lightsaber, shown in the Star Wars franchise.

== See also ==
- Arabic swords
- Bladesmith
- Chinese swords
- Classification of swords
- Glassmakers' symbol
- Japanese swords
- Lists of swords
- Sword making
- Swordsmanship
- Types of swords
- Waster
