= Glassmakers' symbol =

The symbol

The glassmaker's mark (rarely glassmaker's cross:) is a symbol of glassmakers. It is a figure eight (infinity sign) over a sword or cross, illustrating a German glassmaker's saying: Es ist ein unendlich Kreuz, Glas zu machen. A literal translation would be: "It is an endless cross to make glass." However, the meaning of "cross" in this context is itself a common German phrase meaning arduous or bother.

The symbol dates to 1948, when the magazine Glastechnischen Berichte displayed it on the cover. The figure eight was said to symbolize the material glass in its two phases, as a molten liquid on the left and as a non-crystalline solid on the right. In the transition between the two states, a metal sword, which stood for the glassmaker's pipe, was a sign of man's dominion over nature.

The German Technical Glass Society (Deutsche Glastechnische Gesellschaft) and the Czech Glass Society (Česká sklářská společnost) use the glassmaker's mark as the symbol of their associations.

== Sources ==
- Friedrich Holl: Symbol für Glas, In: Friedrich Holl (Hrsg.): Die Poesie des Glases. Des Glases Lob – Der Arbeit Lied – Des Glases Geist, 3. Aufl., Zwiesel, 1983; 1. Aufl. 1966 auch: Werks-Kurznachrichten der Grazer Glasfabrik (Untertitel: „Der Motzer“), Nr. 60, Graz 1963, S. 1–56
- Julius Broul: Das Symbol für Glas, In: Glass Science and Technology, Verlag der Deutschen glastechnischen Gesellschaft, Frankfurt am Main, 1999, Jg. 72, Heft 4, S. N39-N40, ISSN 0946-7475
- Marita Haller: „Das unendliche Kreuz der Glasmacher“ unterstützt die Glasaktivitäten der Region, Pressglas Korrespondenz, 2010/3, S. 316
