= Arnis in popular culture =

Arnis in popular culture reflects the impact that the Filipino martial arts of arnis/eskrima/kali have made outside of the martial arts community. The three terms are roughly interchangeable and for the purpose of convenience, the term arnis will be used throughout the article. These arts emphasize weapon-based fighting with sticks, blades, improvised weapons and hand-to-hand fighting which is formally known as Mano Mano or Pangamut. Because of this training with live weapons, elements of arnis have made an impact in film, video games, television, and comic books. Arnis is often used to train actors and stuntmen how to handle similar weapons for use in movies.

== Film (most recent first) ==
- 2021: In the animated Disney movie Raya and the Last Dragon, the fighting style of Raya (voiced by Kelly Marie Tran) is based on pencak silat from Indonesia and arnis from the Philippines.
- 2021: In the film Dune, according to director Denis Villeneuve, eskrima is used as the primary style of fighting in the film due to the use of personal force fields necessitating a return to knife fighting, as only slow moving objects may penetrate said shielding.
- 2020: The Netflix film, The Old Guard featured Charlize Theron, and her fellow actors using various martial arts for their scenes, including Hung Gur, taekwondo, judo, silat, kali, and more.
- 2017: In the film John Wick: Chapter 2, Keanu Reeves played the role of John Wick, an elite hitman who relies heavily on the deadly martial art of arnis for most of his bladed encounters. The best single scene for a close-up look at some of the techniques and footwork John Wick takes from this art is the train knife fight with Common's character Cassian. A classic brutal knife duel effectively showcasing John Wick's knife fighting style of choice through his complex live hand moves and elegant "hakbang" movement or footwork.
- 2015: In the film Spy starring Melissa McCarthy, Filipino martial arts are used for fight scenes. Melissa McCarthy was trained in kali by Diana Lee Inosanto who is the daughter of Dan Inosanto.
- 2015: According to film director James Wan during a cast interview, the final fight scene with Vin Diesel and Jason Statham in Furious 7 was inspired by eskrima, using metal pipes and wrenches instead of sticks. Vin Diesel had trained in eskrima from prior experience.
- The Marvel Cinematic Universe features arnis being used by Winter Soldier, Black Widow and Hawkeye.
- 2014: The award-winning film Bonifacio: Ang Unang Pangulo about Katipunan revolutionary leader Andrés Bonifacio (who is often depicted with a signature bolo in popular culture and artworks) extensively used Filipino martial arts for the bladed fight scenes. Sonny Sison was the fight choreographer.
- 2014: In the film The Equalizer, Denzel Washington uses Filipino martial arts techniques to take out a room of Russian thugs using weapons like a knife and improvised weapons such as a shot glass and cork screws which were used like push daggers. Denzel Washington is also a student of Filipino Martial Arts legend Dan Inosanto.
- 2014: Rafael Kayanan of the Sayoc Kali system was the Fight Choreographer for the close quarter fights where Liam Neeson fights various opponents inside the airplane of the film Non-Stop.
- 2014: Arnis was extensively used in the film I, Frankenstein. Actor Aaron Eckhart trained for 6 months under Ron Balicki and Diana Lee Inosanto for the role.
- 2012: In The Scorpion King 3: Battle for Redemption Agromael (Dave Batista) uses arnis in his fight scenes.
- 2011: The Bladed Hand: The Global Impact of Filipino Martial Arts is a documentary film by Jay Ignacio, Sonny Sison, Kent Vives which features interviews from many of the prominent Filipino grandmasters around the world and in the Philippines who are alive today. It is unprecedented as they were able to obtain permission to document arnis systems which have held long bitter rivalries with each other, something which would not have been possible a decade ago.
- 2011: In Hanna, the characters played by Eric Bana and Saoirse Ronan are shown practicing 6-step sinawali double-stick drills at the beginning of the film. Towards the end, Hanna gets into a fight and uses Filipino trapping and knife-fighting techniques. Ronan trained at the Inosanto Academy for the role and Jeff Imada was fight choreographer for the film as well.
- 2011: Olivier Schneider was the fight choreographer for the film Unknown starring Liam Neeson. Schneider and Neeson had both previously worked on Taken in 2008. In Unknown, Neeson's character regains his effective combat skills and uses a broken piece of glass like a knife to kill his assailant.
- 2011 and 2010: In the two TV movie specials of SP (SP: Yabou-hen (SP: Motion Picture I) - 2010 & SP: Kakumei Hen (SP: Motion Picture II) - 2011), Kaoru Inoue (Junichi Okada) used kali in fighting most of the antagonists in the films.
- 2010: In Wrong Side of Town the characters of Dave Batista called Big Ronnie or BR and Marrese Crump called Markus or Bordas Bodyguard use arnis in fight scenes.
- 2010: In the Korean movie The Man from Nowhere, the main character, Cha Tae-sik, takes out a room full of henchman using Filipino empty-hand and knife-fighting techniques. A fight also happens between Cha Tae-sik and a Thai gang member in which they use a variety of Filipino trapping techniques. The Thai gang member is armed with a Karambit which is used in Filipino Martial Arts and Silat Training.
- 2010: In Kick-Ass, the title character, played by Aaron Johnson, used arnis sticks to fight criminals and Hit-Girl played by Chloë Grace Moretz used the signature Filipino balisong knives.
- 2010: In Repo Men, Forest Whitaker (a long time kali student under Dan Inosanto) and Jude Law used kali for the fight scenes with Jeff Imada as fight choreographer.
- 2010: In The Book of Eli, the title character, played by Denzel Washington, uses a stylized Bolo blade in self-defense. Washington trained for months in kali fighting styles in preparation for the role under Dan Inosanto and his senior student Jeff Imada.
- 2009: Eskrimadors is a landmark Filipino Martial Arts documentary film by Kerwin Go which features the real-life legendary grandmasters and interviews from Doce Pares, Balintawak Eskrima and other major schools from the Cebu area. It is of particular significance because it is the first documentary film on FMA that was made by a Filipino.
- 2009: In Ninja Assassin, kali was used in the dual weapon choreography. Chad Stahelski and Jonathan Eusebio of 87Eleven Action Design were fight choreographers. Stahelski and Eusebio are students of Dan Inosanto.
- 2008: Olivier Schneider was the fight choreographer for the film Taken. starring Liam Neeson. Neeson trained under Schneider and used a combination of Wing Chun, silat and arnis.
- 2008: In the James Bond movie Quantum of Solace, actor Daniel Craig used Filipino martial arts to subdue a knife-wielding assassin. 2nd-unit director Dan Bradley worked with the same team from the Bourne series of movies for the fight choreography.
- 2002, 2004 and 2007: In the 2002 movie The Bourne Identity and its 2004 and 2007 sequels, The Bourne Supremacy and The Bourne Ultimatum, Matt Damon used kali for the fight scenes, and was trained by Damon Caro and Jonathan Eusebio. The primary fight choreographer was Jeff Imada assisted by Damon Caro and Jonathan Eusebio, all students of Dan Inosanto. The first film's director Doug Liman stated that kali's principles of minimal effort influenced their development of Bourne's character.
- 2008: In Big Stan, the title character, played by Rob Schneider, fights prison inmates with a mop broken in half as his kali sticks and his last opponent was Dan Inosanto.
- 2008: In Punisher: War Zone, Ray Stevenson (Punisher) practiced arnis as part of his stick-fighting and knife-fighting training.
- 2007: In 300, arnis/kali/eskrima was used as the base for the blade and shield choreography. FMA's signature heavy use of the off-hand can be seen in the offensive use of the shield. The fight choreographer, Damon Caro is a senior student of Dan Inosanto. Not much is known about the fighting style of the Spartans, so arnis was used as a replacement.
- 2000, 2004 and 2013: In the Chronicles of Riddick series, Riddick (Vin Diesel) employs a more aggressive variation of arnis. Paul Rapovski of Kali de Leon was the fight choreographer.
- 2006: In Mission: Impossible III, Tom Cruise and Keri Russell's characters were shown training with rattan sticks.
- 2005: In The Prodigy, fight/stunt coordinator Ron Balicki stylized all the fights in the film using arnis techniques.
- 2006: In The Sensei, Diana Lee Inosanto's character teaches a young boy arnis.
- Wesley Snipes used arnis in 2004's Blade: Trinity. Fight coordinator Chuck Jeffries is a kali expert (under Dan Inosanto) and Snipes learned from Jeff Ward who was fight choreographer in the first 2 movies.
- 2004: In Resident Evil: Apocalypse, Milla Jovovich's character was trained by Ron Balicki to use arnis to finish off several opponents with expandable batons. Ron Balicki (a senior JKD/kali instructor under Dan Inosanto) and his daughter Diana Lee Inosanto were the fight choreographers.
- 2004: Mano Mano 3: Arnis the Lost Art is a 2004 film starring Ronnie Ricketts, the brother of Christopher Ricketts who is a founder of the Bakbakan International style.
- 2003: In Daredevil, Ben Affleck stars as Matt Murdock, a blind lawyer who fights for justice in the courtroom and on the streets of New York as the masked vigilante Daredevil, using a stick for main weapon.
- 2003: The Hunted starring Tommy Lee Jones and Benicio del Toro showcased Filipino knife fighting which was choreographed by Tom Kier and Rafael Kayanan, a master practioniner of Sayoc Kali.
- 2003: In The Matrix Reloaded, Neo used the two halves of a broken spear like batons, was able to block the henchmen's strikes with one spear piece and immediately attack with the other. Two henchmen were attempting to attack Neo on his left and right side. However, Neo, using his weapons, was able to quickly defend himself and attack them simultaneously.
- 2003: In the film Lara Croft: Tomb Raider - The Cradle of Life starring Angelina Jolie, Filipino martial arts are used for some fight scenes. Angelina appears training with kali sticks against bo staff
- 2002: The sequel movie Blade II features arnis once again. Kali instructor Jeff Ward returned as fight coordinator and Wesley Snipes studied under him.
- 2002: In Ballistic: Ecks vs. Sever, Lucy Liu's character uses arnis to fend off her opponents with a pair of sticks.
- 2002: In Equilibrium, the commentary reveals that arnis is used in the fight between John Preston and Brandt.
- 2001: In Kiss of the Dragon, Jet Li's character uses eskrima-based stick fighting in one scene where he was trapped inside the dojo full of black belters.
- 1998: Arnis is the weapon style used in the choreography of the popular comic-book film Blade. Fight choreographer Jeff Ward is a Pekiti Tirsia instructor and stunt coordinators Jeff Imada plus Chuck Jeffries are Inosanto Kali experts as well.
- 1997: In Mortal Kombat Annihilation, Sultan Uddin (Cabales Eskrima) not only portrayed Reptile, but choreographed Princess Kitana's fight sequence showcasing movements of Eskrima Serrada.
- 1996: In Barb Wire, Temuera Morrison's character uses empty-handed arnis to fight Customs agents, Diana Lee Inosanto and Ron Balicki.
- 1995: In the film Under Siege 2, Steven Seagal uses a knife.
- 1992: In the film Under Siege, Steven Seagal has a knife fight against Tommy Lee Jones.
- 1992: In Mission of Justice, Jeff Wincott faces down a gauntlet of cudgel stick-wielding combatants in a hallway.
- 1992: In Martial Law 2, Jeff Wincott does sinawali and fought two thugs in a dojo.
- 1991: In the film A Grande Arte also known as (Exposure), Peter Coyote fights Tcheky Karyo using knives and against another villain.
- 1991: In the film Out for Justice, Steven Seagal fights Dan Inosanto using a broken pool cue against Dan's sticks.
- 1991: The film The Perfect Weapon shows the title character played by Jeff Speakman using arnis in several scenes (arnis had been adopted by the American kempō schools as of 1991).
- 1986: Kamagong, a film starring Lito Lapid as an arnisador featuring the titular sticks made from highly sought-after kamagong hardwood.
- 1986: Big Trouble in Little China, a film starring Kurt Russell showed a triad member (Jeff Imada) demonstrating sinawali with a balisong and a collapsible baton in the airport during the pivotal kidnap scene. Imada was the choreographer for this movie as well. Many of the triad stuntmen in the film were students of Inosanto, with Dan Inosanto making an appearance as well during the fight scene in the storage room.
- 1984: Arnis: The Sticks of Death, a film starring Rolando Dantes of Modern Arnis, one of the earliest films about arnis.
- 1978: In his unfinished film Game of Death, Bruce Lee faced his close collaborator and arnis master Dan Inosanto in one of the featured battles with masters of different martial arts as he climbs the tower. This is one of the films that first brought arnis to popular international attention.
- 1974: The Pacific Connection, a film starring Rolando Dantes.
- 1973: In Enter the Dragon the use of arnis is best illustrated in the fight scene with the guards in which Bruce Lee uses their own weapons against them. Lee is demonstrating escrima, using doble baston (double sticks) to subdue the guards.

== Television ==
- In 2020 The Mandalorian's first-season finale, the Armorer uses eskrima as she laid the pain down on a cadre of stormtroopers.
- Castlevania (2017–2021) season 2 episode 6, Dracula moves his castle to Brăila while Trevor Belmont slices and dices demonic attackers. These include a fire drake and a crow-like demon who is killed with kali techniques and two weapons.
- In The Umbrella Academy (2019), Cha-Cha uses a pool cue broken in half against Allison and Diego, showing arnis techniques.
- Coco Martin was trained in arnis sticks, boxing and mixed martial arts (MMA) by a fellow martial artist, stuntman and actor Val Iglesias for his protagonist role as a policeman named SPO2 Ricardo "Cardo" Dalisay in Ang Probinsyano.
- In episode 2 of the 2017 J-drama Crisis: Special Security Squad, the squad was practicing eskrima as part of their training routine.
- The main character Matt Murdock uses arnis sticks given to him by his teacher Stick in the series Daredevil (2015).
- The character Mockingbird played by Adrianne Palicki in the ABC television series Agents of S.H.I.E.L.D. uses the martial art in her fight scenes.
- Sayoc Kali has been being used for the fight choreography in the CBS TV series NCIS: Los Angeles since 2012. Among the trainers and fight choreographers is Rafael Kayanan.
- In Arrow season one episode "The Odyssey", during a flashback, Slade Wilson trains Oliver Queen, the main character of the series, in eskrima. He was also previously shown training with his ally and bodyguard, John Diggle, using this martial art. In the fight between Ra's al Ghul and Oliver in season three episode "The Climb", they are seen to be using a Straight Kris which is a type of Filipino Sword. In season eight, Connor Hawke wields electrified eskrima sticks. Arnis is used throughout the series for the fight choreography done by James Bamford.
- In Young Justice, Robin utilizes eskrima sticks just like his comic book counterpart.
- In Avatar: The Legend of Korra, The Lieutenant wields two electrified kali sticks powered by a generator on his back.
- The Marvel Studios TV series Mutant X featured Kali Deleon.
- The show Relic Hunter starring Tia Carrere also used Kali Deleon in the choreography.
- Kali Deleon was also used in the Disney Channel children's series The Famous Jett Jackson as well.
- In the Discovery Channel series Fight Quest, hosts Doug Anderson and Jimmy Smith trained under Pekiti Tirsia (Tuhon Leo Gaje) and Modern Arnis (GM Cristino Vasquez) instructors.
- In the BBC Three series Last Man Standing, contestants travel to Banahaw to learn arnis, and have a showdown in which one contestant is crowned winner.
- On the History Channel's program Human Weapon, the hosts Jason Chambers and Bill Duff practiced various styles of arnis/eskrima/kali, eventually sparring with a Doce Pares champion.
- The weapons choreography in the Encantadia fantasy TV series shown on GMA Network in the Philippines features some eskrima moves and the actors were given light training by arnisadors.
- In Highlander: The Series, Adrian Paul's character Duncan MacLeod switched to arnis sticks when he renounced the blade after he accidentally slew his friend Richie Ryan. Paul had travelled to the Philippines to learn the art and was trained by "an old man with missing teeth".
- The fighting style of the character Teyla Emmagan from Stargate: Atlantis is based on arnis.
- In Mortal Kombat Conquest, Sultan Uddin showcased Eskrima Serrada as the character Noob Saibot.
- In Leverage, retrieval specialist Eliot Spencer's fighting style is based primarily on arnis and panantukan.
- In SP, Kaoru Inoue of the SP division uses arnis as his main martial art. Junichi Okada had been trained by kali instructor Yorinaga Nakamura for some time prior to his leading role in the TV series that he is allowed to teach kali in Japan when Okada had announced it in a 2010 press conference.
- Professional wrestler Steve Blackman used arnis as a signature weapon during his tenure in the World Wrestling Federation (now World Wrestling Entertainment) as part of his pre-match entrance.
- In the season 2 of Yu-Gi-Oh! VRAINS, George Gore, both an ally and rival of Yusaku Fujiki, the series' main character uses a series of cards (it is called archetype in the said franchise) called "Dinowrestler", and it is based on fighting-styled dinosaurs, firstly named after their fighting style, along with respective dinosaur names as its name basis (in this case, Dinowrestler Eskrimamenochi, named after Mamenchisaurus and eskrima).

== Video games ==
- The pseudo-Rastafarian character Gabriel Tosh in StarCraft II: Wings of Liberty utilizes a large stylized balisong as part of his arsenal.
- Blazblue's Hazama, or Terumi, uses a pair of balisong in one of his moves.
- The Spy character class in the game Team Fortress 2 uses a balisong knife as his primary weapon to kill opponents via backstabbing.
- In Soulcalibur II, the Filipina native character Talim (Filipino for blade or edge) fights in the Banaue Rice Terraces and uses arnis with a pair of tonfa.
- In Robert Ludlum's The Bourne Conspiracy (2008), hand-to-hand Panantukan techniques were choreographed by Jeff Imada, who worked on the Jason Bourne films.
- In the Mortal Kombat series, Sonya Blade uses kali sticks as her weapon style in Mortal Kombat: Deadly Alliance (2002) and Mortal Kombat: Armageddon (2006). New character Kobra utilizes them in her absence in Mortal Kombat: Deception (2004). Quan Chi and Dairou use escrima as one of their open-handed fighting styles in both Deception and Armageddon.
- Hitman: Blood Money features a target who is described as an accomplished arnis-style sword fighter, and in Hitman: Absolution, Agent 47 uses Filipino Panantukan as his hand-to-hand combat style to effectively incapacitate assailants. Some of his knife takedown animations are also reminiscent of eskrima.
- In the Street Fighter games, the character Rolento incorporates techniques reminiscent of arnis by fighting with a nightstick primarily for striking at close range and throwing knives as his projectile weapons.
- Eagle, also from Street Fighter utilizes kali sticks in fighting in a likely style fusion of bōjutsu and arnis.
- Granado Espada has stances named Arnis and Eskrima dagger stances.
- The Oro from Condemned: Criminal Origins utilize arnis as their main way of fighting.
- Art of Fighting character Mr. Big uses modified rattan sticks that can connect together, and fights with a style based on arnis. He is an eskrima practitioner according to his official profile.
- Nightwing uses arnis sticks in Arkham City, Arkham Knight, and Injustice: Gods Among Us.
- Far Cry 3 features elements of arnis, used by Jason Brody, Vaas Montenegro, and Hoyt Volker.
- Splinter Cell: Blacklist Sam Fisher uses empty hands techniques of kali as non-lethal style and karambit as lethal style.
- Josie Rizal, a Filipino character from Tekken 7, has a fusion of eskrima and kickboxing as her fighting style.
- In Yakuza 0, one of the weapon styles Goro Majima can learn from Taiwanese weapons expert Fei Hui is kali, which he describes as the "national sport [of the Philippines]".
- A legend known as Octane from Apex Legends has an heirloom (melee weapon) which is a balisong rigged with a stim syringe at the back of the blade.
- In Call of Duty: Modern Warfare and Call of Duty: Mobile, kali sticks appear as a weapon in multiplayer.
- In Street Fighter 6, Filipino-born newcomer Yasmine uses a mix of eskrima or kali and silat along with a karambit knife for her fighting style.

== Western comics ==
- The character Grail in Whilce Portacio's Wetworks is a Filipino who uses arnis as energy-projection melee weapons.
- Several popular DC Comics characters use arnis as part of their typical martial arts regimen. Specifically, Dick Grayson as Nightwing and Barbara Gordon both fight with the sticks as a main part of their arsenal, and are defining weapons of their two characters. Other heroes based in Gotham City have trained in arnis/eskrima/kali as well.
- The character Deadpool wields eskrima sticks in Fabian Nicieza's Cable and Deadpool series.
- Marvel Comics character Mockingbird, a member of the superhero team the Avengers, makes use of a combined form of arnis and kobudō, using two 'battle staves' for the former style, which she can attach together to make use of the latter. While she is capable of arnis, she is a much stronger kobudō fighter, and so tends to prefer using the latter, but has at times also used the former.
- The titular character Kick-Ass uses arnis as his primary weapon in both the comics and its live action film.
- Nightcrawler of the X-Men has occasionally been depicted using arnis sticks. In the first issue of his self-titled 2014 series, Nightcrawler is shown to dual wield, wielding two arnis sticks in his hands and one held in his tail.
- Night Thrasher of the New Warriors is also known to use these weapons.
- Danny Rand utilizes arnis sticks after his resurrection in The Undead Iron Fist.

== See also ==
- Arnis
- Filipino martial arts
- Juramentado
- Maharlika
- Timawa
