= Vic Sanchez =

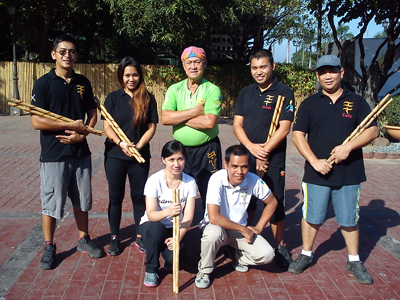
Grandmaster Vicente Sanchez with students at Rizal Park

Grandmaster Vicente "Vic" R. Sanchez was a Filipino martial artist and the founder of Kali Arnis International.

== Early life ==
GM Vic Sanchez was born on April 25, 1934.

== FMA Styles ==
In his practice of Filipino martial arts for over 60 years, Sanchez mastered four major arnis systems:

- Cinco Teros from Pangasinan - under Antonio Javier. According to Sanchez's teachers, this was the style of Arnis practiced by Andres Bonifacio.
- Kasilagan (Kali Salag Ilag) - under Johnny Panuringan
- Modern Arnis - under Remy A. Presas
- Tersia Serrada, Cadenilla y Espada y Daga (Lightning Scientific Arnis International) - under Benjamin Luna Lema

== Grandmasters ==
Vic Sanchez had been a long-time student and friend of Remy Presas and Benjamin Luna Lema. Sanchez and Presas met through Roland Dantes on the film set of "Pacific Connection" (alternate title: "The Stickfighter"). The two became fast friends, as they were both very impressed with each other's martial skills. Presas was so impressed of Sanchez' skill that he insisted upon including Sanchez' Cinco Teros in the pages of "The Practical Art of Eskrima".

Sanchez was one of a handful of Modern Arnis practitioners worldwide to be promoted to Lakan Walo (8th degree black belt). He was also a member of the Modern Arnis Senior Masters Council, a founding member of the World Kali-Eskrima-Arnis Grandmasters Council (headquartered in Manila) as well as founder of Kali-Arnis International.

Sanchez remained deeply loyal to his late friend and teacher, and continued to promote Modern Arnis making it the first step in his training progression. After a student mastered Modern Arnis, he then progressed to Lightning Scientific Arnis and then to Cinco Teros and Kasilagan.

== Awards ==
GM Vic Sanchez was conferred the Living Legend Award during the 1st Filipino Martial Arts Hall of Fame awarding ceremonies in 2012.

== Death ==
GM Vic Sanchez died in June, 2017 after illness and hospitalization.

== See also ==
- Modern Arnis
- Arnis
- Filipino Martial Arts
