= Tim Hartman =

American martial artist

Tim Hartman (born 1965) is a practitioner of the Filipino martial art of modern arnis and balintawak eskrima, and the president of the World Modern Arnis Alliance (WMAA).

In 2000, he tested for his 6th degree black belt and Datu at the Michigan summer camp, making him the highest tested rank in the U.S. under Remy Presas, founder of modern arnis.

Hartman gives seminars and camps across North America and Europe. In June 2005, Hartman was promoted to 9th degree by the WMAA Advisory Board. This promotion reflected his leadership position within the WMAA, and was not meant to replace the rank that he earned from Presas.

Hartman is a competitor in Nafma, where he holds state, national and a world title. His most recognized success in tournament fighting is in stick fighting, where competitors compete against one another sparring with two padded sticks to score points. He is also a notable practitioner in kata, specifically Filipeno kata, which is the event for which he currently holds the world title.

On April 23, 2007, Hartman's martial arts achievements were further recognized when he was promoted to 9th degree in Kombatan and awarded the Grandmaster title by Presas.

Overall, Tim Hartman's career in martial arts is marked by his dedication to teaching, his skill in competition, and his leadership in promoting Filipino martial arts globally.

Hartman resides in West Seneca, New York, and teaches at Horizon Martial Arts, the school he founded.

== Magazine coverage ==
- Paul O' Grady, "Modern Arnis: The Next Generation", BlackBelt, August 1998
- Interview in Fighter magazine, March 2002
- Dan Anderson, Inside Kung Fu, June 2002
- Fighter magazine, January 2003
- MartialTalk magazine cover photos, July 2003 and February 2004
- Craig T. Marks, "Marissa's Heroes", TaeKwonDoTimes.com, January 2004
- Craig Marks, "Martial Artists United for Stricken Child", BlackBeltMag.com, June 2004
- "How Tim Hartman Sticks to Modern Arnis", Martial Arts Professional, February 2007
- Datu Kelly Worden, "Who are the Datus of Modern Arnis?", Realfighting, unknown date

== Books ==
- Reynaldo S. Galang, Warrior Arts of the Philippines ISBN 0-9727679-1-6 Arjee Enterprises (April 2005), paperback: 457 pages : Pg 304 "Insights and Features"

== See also ==
- World Eskrima Kali Arnis Federation (WEKAF)
- International Arnis Federation (IAF)
- Arnis Philippines International Federation (iARNIS)
- World Modern Arnis Alliance (WMAA)
