= Kombatan =

Filipino martial arts system

- IPMAF Logo
- Focus: Stick fighting
- Country of origin: Philippines
- Creator: Ernesto Presas
- Parenthood: Eskrima
- Olympic sport: No

Kombatan is a Filipino martial arts system. The founder of the system was GGM Ernesto Amador Presas (10th DAN). The current head of the system is Ernesto Presas Jr. The style is known for its double stick techniques, but it features other stick and blade techniques, as well as empty-hand methods.

== Origin ==
Ernesto A. Presas Sr. was born in the coastal town of Hinigaran, Negros Occidental on May 20, 1945. At age 8 he began his martial arts training under his father, Jose Presas, a well known escrima practitioner at that time. He went on to be an athlete in his college years, participating in various sports. His training in the martial arts is eclectic, having studied judo, jujutsu, karate, and various forms of Filipino and Japanese weaponry. He was Lakan Sampu (10th Dan) in arnis and Mano Mano (hand-to-hand combat) and Lakan Walo (8th Dan) in Philippine Weaponry.

Remy Presas recognized that the classical arts of their country were losing their appeal and therefore slowly dying. He modernized the native arts into an effective fighting system that would be appealing to martial arts students living in modern Filipino society and called it Modern Arnis. His dream to re-introduce the native arts led to the development of Modern Arnis. Ernesto Presas continued the work after his brother emigrated to the US in 1975. He changed his version of the art extensively in the nineties, and renamed it Kombatan.

In 1970 he began to teach Filipino martial arts in the University of the Philippines and Lyceum of the Philippines. Later other classes expanded to the University of Santo Tomas, Central Colleges of the Philippines, the Far Eastern Military Academy, Philippine National Police Academy, and the Philippines Air Force Officer's School. Also in 1970 he was invited to Japan at Expo '70' to demonstrate Arnis.

After returning home, with the help of his friend Frederico Lazo, he opened his first club. Later he formed the Modern Arnis Association of the Philippines International and the ARJUKEN (which stands for Arnis, Jujutsu, Kendo) Karate Association to formally spread the art within the Philippines. In 1975 he founded the International Philippine Martial Arts Federation (IPMAF) and began to spread the Filipino art to the outside world.

== Styles ==
Kombatan combines several traditional Filipino styles that have been blended into a single art:

- Palis
- Hirada Batangueno - Pinayong. Commonly referred to as hirada bantagueña, after the Batangas province from which it originated, pinayong is Kombatan's "umbrella" block-and-counter pattern. It consists of an umbrella-like covering block/counter followed with any number of strikes; often an upward strike that can impact areas such as the groin, chin, or forearm.
- Sungkiti Tutsada - Sungkiti also called tutsada, tuslok, or salag tusok represents the deadly thrusting techniques that can devastate an opponent. It is especially effective for combat in places where lateral movement is restricted. Sungkiti aims to attack vulnerable areas like the eyes, throat, solar plexus, underarms, and groin.
- Abaniko Largo / Corto
- Doblada / Doblete
- Banda y Banda
- Ocho Ocho - Ocho ocho means "figure eight," and this pattern of movement follows the path of the infinity symbol. Ocho ocho may be delivered in a wide or tight manner, depending on the situation.
- Sinawali
- Espada Y Daga - sword and dagger, or stick and dagger methods
- Daga sa Daga
- Dulo Dulo - The dulo dulo is a specialty weapon of Kombatan. It is simply a short stick, or horn, of about six inches with points at both ends. It is used in close quarters to attack sensitive areas of the body. It can be utilized to strike; to force your opponent to release you from a grabbing attack; or to magnify the effect of a joint lock by attacking the sensitive points you are controlling.
- Dos Puntas
- Tres Puntas
- Bangkaw - The bangkaw is a staff, usually around six-feet in length, used to attack and defend. Kombatan features techniques for its use against another staff, as well as other weapons. Its primary advantage is its long reach. With it, one can counter an attack from an opponent armed with a bolo or knife without coming into close proximity. The bangkaw is a martial adaptation of the long stick that is used in rural areas of the Philippines to carry two large buckets of water on ones shoulder.
- Sibat
- Mano-Mano
- Sipaan
- Dumog

== See also ==
- Modern Arnis
- Arnis
- Balintawak Eskrima
- Doce Pares
- Filipino Martial Arts
