= WMAA =

WMAA may refer to:

- Waste Management Association of Australia, Australia's main non-government association for waste management professionals
- Whitney Museum of American Art, a Modern art museum in Manhattan
- WMAA-LP, a low-power radio station (93.7 FM) licensed to serve Moca, Puerto Rico
- WMAA-TV, a television station in Mississippi
- World Martial Arts Association, promoting martial arts generally
- World Modern Arnis Association, promoting the Filipino martial art, Modern Arnis
- Western Martial Academies of Australia, promoting western martial arts in Australia
- West Michigan Aviation Academy, a high school in Grand Rapids, Michigan.
- World Modern Arnis Alliance
