= Mind, Body & Kick Ass Moves =

- Title screen
- Genre: Martial arts
- Presented by: Chris Crudelli
- Narrated by: Mark Durden-Smith
- Country of origin: United Kingdom
- Original language: English
- No. of series: 1
- No. of episodes: 10 + 1 Special

Production
- Executive producers: Celia Taylor; Trevor Hyett
- Producer: Will Henshaw
- Running time: 28 minutes

Original release
- Network: BBC Three
- Release: 9 August – 6 September 2004

Related
- Kick Ass Miracles; Kick Ass in a Crisis

Mind, Body & Kick Ass Moves is a television programme broadcast on BBC Three. Presented by Chris Crudelli the documentary series travels around the Far East exploring different martial arts and learning the secret skills and knowledge of the 'Grandmasters'. The series investigates aspects of each different martial art by filming the masters demonstrating their style and skills. There is one series of 10 episodes. Each episode focuses on a mix of different martial arts and masters and shows Crudelli taking some martial arts and tricks to the streets, in a style similar to street magic. The opening narration states Crudelli is a master of combat and esoteric energies.

An edited version was broadcast in the United States in half-hour segments as Mind, Body & Kickin' Moves on FSN.

== Episode one ==
Crudelli travels to Manila in the Philippines where he talks with Ernesto Presas about a martial art which went underground and was kept alive by being taught as a dance. The footwork and hand movements from the dance have their root in the original martial art. Knowing the dance means one can become a good fighter. Crudelli is later shown at a bowling alley where he watches a group of young men as they perform breakdance moves. Crudelli comments that a lot of the moves are similar to Wushu kung fu, and teaches the youths how they could adapt their dance moves into kicks. The action then moves to Beijing where he meets several people who practice tai chi. The narration tells us that hidden beneath the forms of tai chi, are powerful martial arts moves. One master who Crudelli meets is Lau Hung Chi, who practices Sun-style tai chi. On a beach in England Crudelli teaches four female lifeguards about drunken kung ku. Telling them it is all about deception, and by using this technique one can fool their opponent and gain the upper hand. In Japan Crudelli visits a Ninja school near Tokyo, where he meets Masaaki Hatsumi, whom the show identifies as being the last living Ninja, to learn about the art of Ninjutsu. At the school Crudelli tries to avoid a razor-sharp blade being wielded by Hatsumi. Back in China, Crudelli is instructed by Jumin De, one of the jingwumen who combines tai chi and qigong to form his own powerful fighting style.

== Episode two ==
The episode opens with Crudelli giving a female cab driver some self-defence tips, such as how to disarm somebody who had pulled a knife on her. Next we see Tanaka and his daughter Midori. While she shoots arrows at him he slices through them with his sword. Tanaka then attempt to disarm an opponent wielding a sword using only his hands. Back in Manila, Ernesto Presas explains more about Kombatan, a Filipino fighting system. Presas demonstrates the skill of being able to fight an opponent while blindfolded.

He even fights on opponent while carrying on a conversation with Crudelli, not even looking in his opponents direction. He also claims to have an amulet, which prevents him from becoming tired. A short section then follows showing Crudelli demonstrating some qi work with employees of Cardiff Auction Rooms. At Shasui Falls, in Japan, Crudelli is introduced to the concept of Satki (described as "telepathy." The actual term, however, is "sakki," and it actually means "killing intent/qi" or "a thirst for blood"). Aoki explains that one can learn to detect Satki, and by doing so can learn to predict an opponent's moves, thus acting before the opponent has chance to strike. Aoki explains that to develop Satki, a person meditates in standing in a heavy waterfall – something which forces the temperature of the body to fall considerably. After ten minutes in the ice cold waterfall, the person's mind and consciousness opens enough to detect Satki. Aoki also describes what he called vacuum energy, which he uses on his opponent when Satki has been detected. Once Satki is detected Aoki uses vacuum energy in two ways, either to stop his opponent or send them running in the other direction.

== Episode three ==
The beginning of episode three sees Crudelli in an air traffic control tower, teaching a man and a woman some tai chi moves which will help them focus and relax, while keeping them alert. In Japan Crudelli watches Ceremonial archers on horseback as they try to shoot arrows at targets while riding a horse. Crudelli then attempts to learn the skill for himself, by sitting upon a wooden horse and shooting arrows at a target. Back in China, Crudelli meets with a Daoist cook who teaches him how food is linked to martial arts. He explains to Crudelli that for a person to be at their best the five Chinese elements need to be balanced within the body. Eating the correct food can accomplish this. He also explains to Crudelli about the art of Feng shui and its use in the business district of Hong Kong.
