= Combat judo =

Combat judo may refer to:

- Judo, if practiced in a manner which emphasizes self-defense.
- Dumog, a term used in the Philippines to describe the wrestling techniques practiced in the Filipino martial art of Eskrima
