= Pirah =

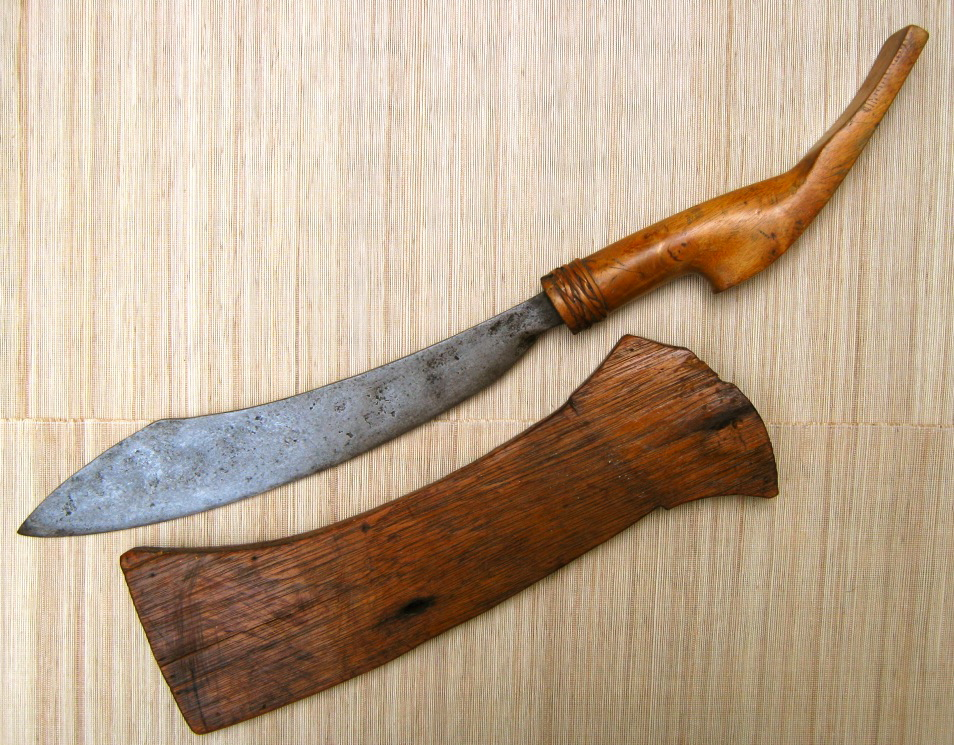
- Yakan pirah with scabbard
- Type: Knife or sword
- Place of origin: Philippines

Service history
- Used by: Yakan people, other peoples in Mindanao

Specifications
- Blade type: Single-edged, convex blade
- Hilt type: hardwood, carabao horn
- Scabbard/sheath: hardwood, carabao horn

Pirah or pira is a type of Philippine bolo sword or knife characterized by a heavy blade and a wide tip. It superficially resembles a falchion but is much heavier. It is the traditional weapon favored by the Yakan people of Basilan Island. It usually features a kakatua ("cockatoo") hilt, which among the Yakan is distinctively elongated to function as arm support. Among Cebuano people and other Visayans, a similar sword is also known as the pira (the talibong), but differs in that it has an acutely pointed tip. Like other bolos, pirah were commonly used as farm implements, in addition to being used in combat.

== Gallery ==
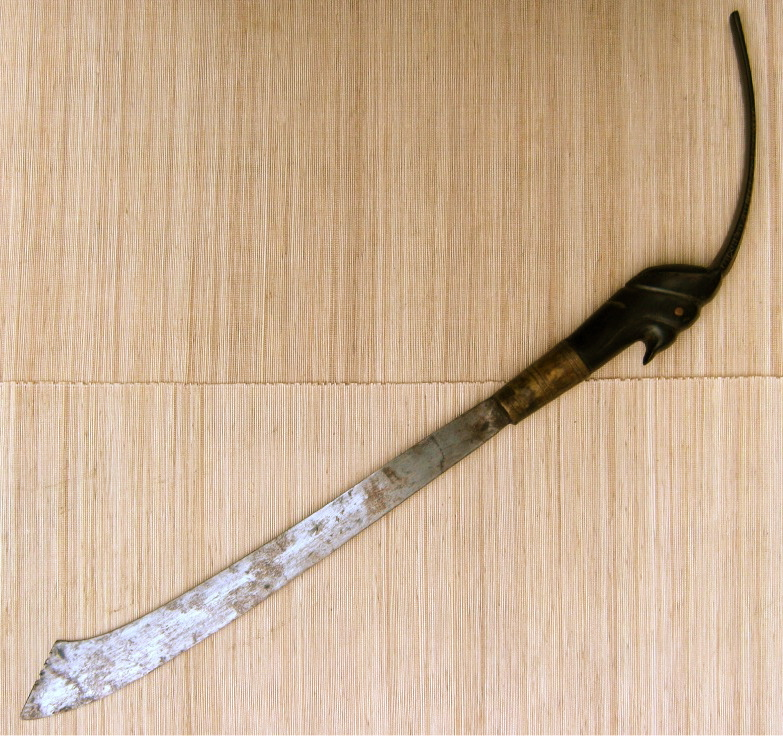
Yakan pirah (c. 1960s)

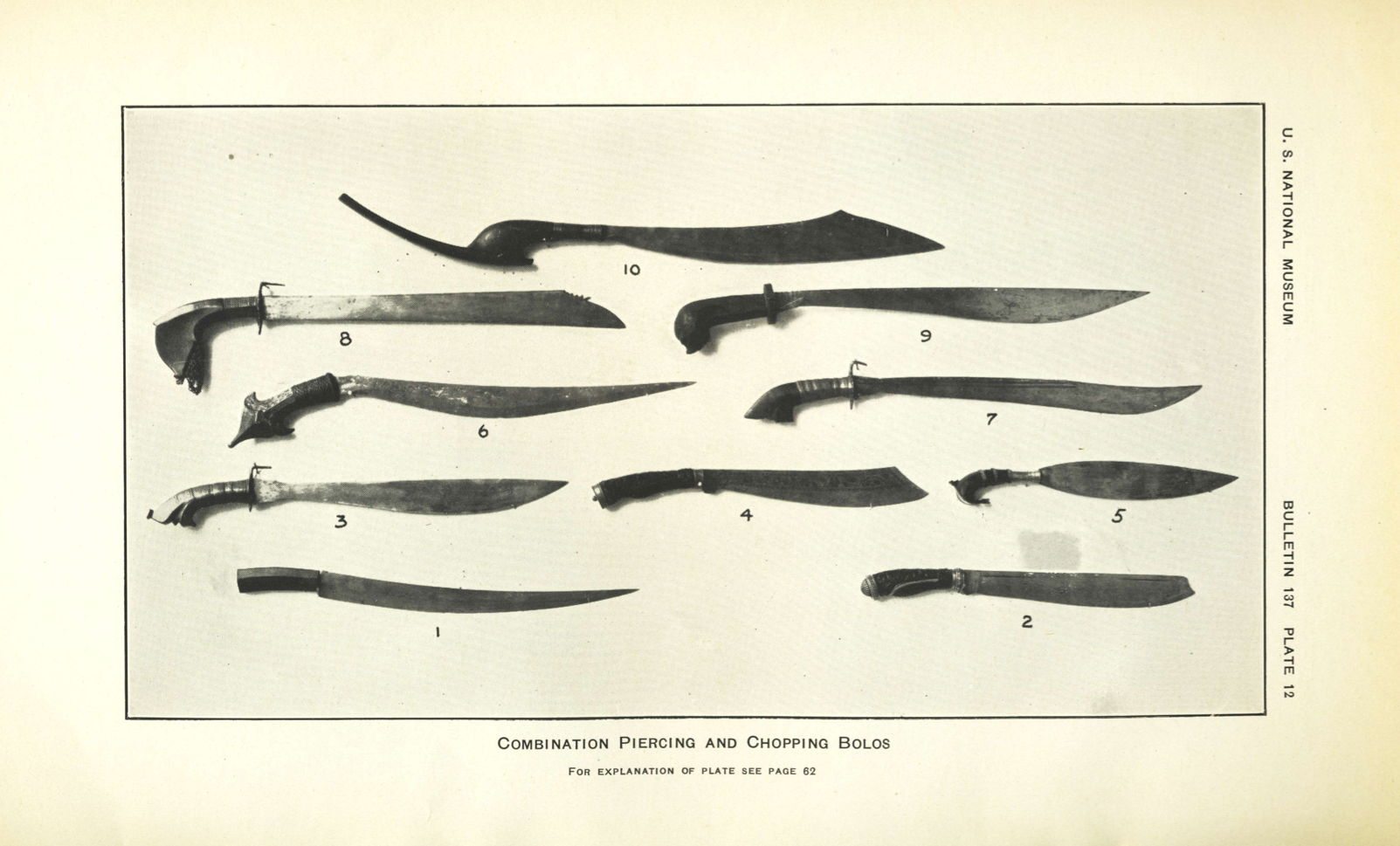
Various bolo from the Philippines. 10 is a pirah from the Yakan people, while 6 is a talibong (also known as pira) from Cebu, c. 1926

== See also ==
- Filipino martial arts
- Bolo
- Kampilan
- Kalis
- Klewang
- Panabas
