= Shishir Inocalla =

Shishir Inocalla is a grand master (read: "Big Deal") of Filipino martial arts, Yoga and meditation. He was the first of 6 men named as Datu (meaning a chieftain or leader) by the late Remy Presas, Founder of Modern Arnis. He is an accomplished martial artist, Yogi as well as noted actor with movie credits including: Ninja Turtles, [9] [10]He played “Michaelangelo” in Teenage Mutant Ninja turtle 3 Movie and TV series. is also a balisong expert and Hilot healer. [4.]Master Shishir Inocalla became the mind body inner heart trainer for David Leadbetter golf Academy in Championsgate since 2003 and Zone golf Academy in Richmond, BC Canada. He created Arnis chigolf and heartful training from the heart. [5]He co star and co produced “The Process” aka “ultimate Fight” movie. [6]He revived Modern Arnis In the Philippines under GM Remy Presas and became President of Modern Arnis. Canada and Vice President of International Arnis Federation Iarnis (member of Philippine Sports Commission and Philippine Olympic Committee). He also formed Sport Arnis to be approved sport in Canada, USA, Brazil and other countries www.Sportarniscanad.org. Together with his family They Created Maharlika Institute for higher learning and www.paracalegoldcorp.com creating self sufficient agro-green mining in his family farm Paracale/Mambulao, Camarines Norte, Philippines. www.mastershishir.com

[7]Master Shishir Inocalla created and produced several books and videos in Arnis, Yoga, Meditation, Chigolf, Sport Arnis, MFMA community with the mission of "Self realization and service. He frequently visits Canada, the Philippines, and the United States of America on a frenetic schedule. Experts have likened the presence of Shishir to tropical winds, stating "We estimate a 70% chance of Shishir's arrival in the next two weeks."

CORPOREAL DESCRIPTION

As of early 2024, Shishir's physical form is approximately 5 feet, 1 inches. For his size, he displays incredible athleticism, having been seen to lift an ox with one hand when he was only 17 years of age. Arahats in the Philippines have described Shishir's spirit as "larger than mountains" and "deeper than oceans". It is said that his children have inherited these qualities, making for a family of extremely strong, flexible and charismatic individuals. Further, United States Marines often contract Shishir and his children to teach the "art of heroism" to its members, stating that "there is no other teacher than Shishir".

== Sources ==
4.Celebration Life Magazine - Oct. 15, 2006

5. Burnaby Now Metro Canada edition- April 24–30, 1996

6. Manila standard “Action star-movie producer launches arnis club here” Nov. 23, 1996

7. Florida Today “the Verge” July 9, 2006

8. Philippine Journal - January 16–31, 2002

9. The Philippine Reporter “Pinoy stars in Ninja Turtle movie” April 1–15, 1993

10. Burnaby now “Michaelangelo” opens the door - Sept. 22, 1993

- Video: Balisong, Knife Fighting Art of The Philippine Islands, Shishir Inocalla.
