= Bultong =

Traditional form of wrestling in the Philippines

Bultong is the Ifugao name for their sport of traditional wrestling. It is often played during town and provincial fiestas. Bultong falls under the international classification of belt wrestling.

== Notables ==
Two Ifugao bultong champions who also excelled and became famous in other combat sports are:

- Ronald Bingwaoel – former member of the Philippine sanshou team and one of Asia's best sanshou fighters in the 1990s. He also became a Universal Reality Combat Championship mixed martial arts (MMA) fighter, winning his match in URCC 2 in April 2003.
- Jason Balabal – current Philippine wrestling team member and 2009 Southeast Asian Games gold medalist in freestyle wrestling, 84 kilogram division.

== See also ==
- Filipino Martial Arts
- Buno
- Dumog
