= Buno (wrestling) =

Buno ("to throw" in Tagalog.) is a system of Filipino wrestling like Dumog.

Harimaw Buno, formerly Harimaw Lumad (King of Tiger Wrestling), is a style of Buno used by the Mangyans of Mindoro and the Aetas of Infanta, Quezon.

Buno usually uses standing throws, control locks, joint manipulation, striking, take-downs and ground wrestling techniques,

There is also an armed style of Buno. Weapons that the practitioner can use are knives, spears and bow and arrows. The main weapon used is the lubid or a four-feet long rope.

Training utilizes mud training, canoe training, tamaraw wrestling, log training and tree climbing.

Nagpambuno came from this root word, the meaning is to resist, or grab something from another's grasp.

== See also ==
- Filipino Martial Arts
- Bultong
- Dumog
- Aeta people
- Mangyan peoples
- Zambales
- Mindoro
