= Mike Inay =

Filipino martial artist and founder of Inayan Eskrima (1944–2000)

Michael G. Inay (1944–2000) was the founder of the Filipino martial art of Inayan Eskrima and a Philippine Hall of Fame awardee.

He studied privately under the tutelage of two great Eskrima masters, Max Sarmiento and Angel Cabales. It was Mike Inay who proposed to Angel Cabales the formation of an organization to preserve and promote the Cabales Serrada style of Eskrima. It was this and many other contributions that made Mangisursuro Mike Inay a prominent figure in the Stockton, California Eskrima scene. With Mr. Inay's help, Mr. Cabales formed the first Cabales Serrada association. Mr. Inay also developed a ranking structure for the system.

He later co-founded the West Coast Eskrima Society with its first chairman, Max Sarmiento, in 1979. The West Coast Eskrima Society was formally inaugurated in Los Gatos, California in Mr. Inay's home. The West Coast Eskrima Society was founded in the hopes of preserving, propagating, and promoting the Filipino martial arts. The society was able to unite several Filipino masters under one organization. Among the notable Eskrima masters who joined it were: Max Sarmiento, Mike Inay, Jimmy Tacosa, Jeffrey Elliott, Sam Tendencia, Dentoy Revillar, Gilbert Tenio, Leo Giron, Narrie Babao, Dan Inosanto, and Richard Bustillo.

Inay began teaching law enforcement throughout the United States and became known in the law enforcement community. He also traveled abroad to conduct seminars and clinics on his personal style, Inayan Eskrima, in England, Germany, France, Norway, Sweden, Canada and Australia.

At the request of a large Midwest law enforcement organization, he developed a law enforcement knife defense program called "Spontaneous Knife Defense" or "Reactive Knife Defense". He also appeared on Law Enforcement Television Network (LETN).

During this period, he also developed and refined the Inayan System of Eskrima. Inayan Eskrima comprises seven distinct styles of Eskrima. Each of these styles has a complete set of basic, intermediate, and advanced techniques and concepts that make them viable independent of one other.

Inay placed a learning structure over these styles and a ranking system for grading. He elected to call all of the styles he teaches "Inayan" to avoid confusion with other teachers and styles that might have the same or similar names. This also reduced the amount of controversy and claims of validity others could or could not profess with regard to "Inayan" Eskrima.

Inay developed several courses dealing with pressure-sensitive nerve areas, riot baton, and advanced knife training. He also developed the use of the knife as an alternative weapon for executive protection in instances where a firearm is not warranted or safe to use.

Mike Inay died in 2000 teaching Inayan Eskrima. While alive and head of the system he was referred to by his unofficial title Suro; since his death he is referred to as Mangisursuro, his official title.
