= Dumog =

Filipino style of wrestling

- Also known as: Filipino wrestling
- Focus: Grappling
- Country of origin: Philippines
- Olympic sport: no

Dumog is the Filipino style of wrestling while standing upright and refers to the grappling aspect of Filipino martial arts. The word dumog is most commonly used in Mindanao and the Visayas, while the word buno is used in Luzon, specifically in the Southern Tagalog-speaking provinces as far south as Mindoro. Tribal groups such as the Ifugao, Samal, Ibanag, Manobo, Dumagat, and Maranao are said to practice grappling arts known respectively as bultong, silaga, dama, garong, buteng, purgos, and kapulubod; while ethnic groups such as the Tagalog, Ilokano, Cebuano, Bicolano, Pampanga, and Pangasinan, are said to practice grappling arts known as gabbo, layung, lampugan, pantok, balsakan, and dumog.

Techniques encompass a variety of pushes, pulls, weight shifts and joint locks designed to "move" the opponent, often taking advantage of their weight and direction of force to throw them off balance. Dumog is based on the concept of "control points" or "choke points" on the human body, which are manipulated – for example: by grabbing, pushing, pulling - in order to disrupt the opponent's balance and to keep him off balance. This also creates opportunities for close quarter striking using head butts, knees, forearms and elbows. Dumog also contains methods of joint-locking and choking, as well as takedowns, throws and submission holds. Dumog techniques can be assisted by the environment around you, a wall, lampost or vehicle for example, which helps to immobilise the opponent, or hurt him further by collision with the object. Similarly, Dumog techniques can be used to manipulate an opponent for use as a shield to protect yourself during a multiple attacker scenario, or to quickly move an unwanted person from an area, much like security or law enforcement "come-along" type techniques. Pain compliance is an important aspect of any grappling art. Hence, Dumog techniques can be complemented by nerve point attacks, as well as Kino-mutai which is the term generally used to include pinching, biting, gouging, ripping/tearing methods.

Dumog is taught in most Filipino Martial Arts styles as a small addition to their vast syllabus. However, there are a small handful of FMA based systems such as Harimaw Buno, Apolaki Krav Maga and Dirty Boxing and Garimot Buno whose training focuses on training the art of dumog in much more detail.

== Visayan Dumog ==
Just like the distinct art of Sikaran from Rizal province, the people from the provinces of Antique, Iloilo and Capiz in Panay Island have their own distinct form and traditional sport of Dumog. It has been a pastime enjoyed by young and old for generations and its skilled players have consistently been recruited by the Philippine Wrestling Team.

== See also ==
- Filipino martial arts
- Eskrima
- Sikaran
- Silat
- Kuntao
