= Doce Pares =

Filipino martial art

- Focus: Stick fighting Knife fighting Hand-to-Hand Combat
- Country of origin: Philippines
- Creator: Lorenzo Saavedra; Eulogio Cañete; Filemon Cañete
- Famous practitioners: Ciriaco "Cacoy" Cañete; Dionisio "Diony" Cañete; Daniel "Danny" Guba; Percival "Val" Pableo; Celso Mabalhin
- Parenthood: Eskrima
- Olympic sport: No

Doce Pares (Spanish for Twelve Peers) is a Filipino martial art and a form of Arnis, Kali and Eskrima, that focuses primarily on stick fighting, knife fighting and hand-to-hand combat but also covers grappling and other weapons as well. In reality, the stick is merely considered an extension of the hand, and is meant to represent almost any weapon, from sticks to swords to knives to anything else you can place in your hand and used as a weapon in the modern context. Doce Pares was founded in 1932.

Following the death of Ciriaco Cañete in February 2016 and Dionisio Cañete in August 2021 there is only one surviving Doce Pares Supreme Grandmaster, Danny Guba.

== History ==
In the late 1920s, Eskrima attained a high level of popularity in Cebu City, the second largest city in the Philippines. In 1932, the most renowned eskrimadors, mainly from Cebu, founded Doce Pares as a society to promote the only original native martial art of the Philippines. The name Doce Pares is Spanish, taken from the Twelve Peers or Paladins of Emperor Charlemagne, whose legend (Doce Pares de Francia) the Spanish transmitted to the Philippines through popular literature and theater. To mirror the Twelve Peers, the Doce Pares school had twelve founding masters.

Lorenzo Saavedra, one of the original twelve masters, was recognized as the foremost eskrimador in Cebu City. He was ably supported by four other top-rated eskrimadors: Teodoro and Federico Saavedra, his nephews, and Lorenzo and Filemon Cañete.

Eulogio Cañete, Filemon's older brother, was elected first president of Doce Pares and remained in that position until his death in 1988.

Later, Teodoro Saavedra rose to prominence as the best fighter in the Doce Pares society. Saavedra, an active guerrilla fighter, was captured and killed by the occupying Japanese forces in World War II.

Venancio Bacon was among the first members in the club and a few months later left the club due to arguments that the Doce Pares system was not an effective eskrima and founded Balintawak Eskrima.

In the early 1950s, Eskrima techniques and tactics were analyzed, devised, modified and systematized by Cacoy Cañete, based mostly on actual combat experience with other eskrimadors belonging to rival Eskrima schools. Among his many contributions to the development of this martial art is Eskrido, a combination of judo and Eskrima techniques, as well as the most modern forms of Eskrima-offense and Eskrima-defense.

Of the second generation of Doce Pares eskrimadors, only Cacoy Cañete - now 95, and around 12 years old at the founding of Doce Pares in 1932 - and his right hand Fernando Candawan Sr. are still alive (SGM Cacoy died February 5, 2016). However, several senior instructors, foremost Dionisio "Diony" Cañete (ODL), nephew of Cacoy Cañete, who belong to the third generation of eskrimadors are very much active, teaching their own interpretation of Doce Pares Eskrima. SGM Cacoy Cañete and his style are survived by his children and grandchildren, many of whom are top instructors in Cacoy Doce Pares in the Philippines and United States.

During the late 1970s and early 1980s, Cacoy's nephew - Dionisio Cañete, a well-known attorney and eskrimador since childhood - began to develop formalized rules for Arnis competitions, in order to replace the all-out street brawls that Cacoy was known for, but which repelled most people from training in Arnis, or especially sending their children to train. Diony believed that the art of Eskrima - the martial art of the Philippines - could die if it were not civilized and formalized for the modern era and made accessible to anyone, regardless of age, nationality, background, etc. This began the era of modern Eskrima, with formalized curriculums, tournaments, and so on. Dionisio was also the first to develop full-body armor for tournament sparring. The new tournament rules and armor came together under the World Eskrima Kali Arnis Federation (WEKAF), founded in 1987. Additionally, Dionisio was commissioned by the Philippine government to create a curriculum incorporating all styles of eskrima from the various Philippine islands. The purpose was to engender and preserve the art of Arnis as a Philippine national treasure. The Doce Pares Multi-Style System is now the only officially government recognized Arnis curriculum, to be taught in public schools in furtherance of a law that made Arnis the official sport of the Philippines. Doce Pares Inc. is located at 30/31 Eagle Street, in Santo Nino Village, Banilad section of Cebu City, Philippines.

Cacoy Cañete began to develop a system separate from the Doce Pares Multi-Style System and form Cacoy Doce Pares World Federation. Rather than incorporate the multiple styles of arnis originally found throughout the Philippines - the original styles that formed Doce Pares in 1932 - he eliminated most long and middle range styles and focused almost heavily on close-range combat technique, especially Corto Kurbada (curved strikes). This was largely a result of Cacoy Cañete's vast experience with actual combat with not only competing Arnis systems, but also as a guerrilla fighter against the Japanese during WWII, rumored to comprise over 100 no-holds-barred contests wherein waivers were signed releasing both parties from any liability for injuries or death.

== Doce Pares Multi-Style System ==
Dionisio "Diony" Cañete was the SGM of the organisation until 2021. He created a curriculum that took into account all the original styles of Doce Pares.

There are seven main components of the multi style system: Single Stick (Solo Olisi), Double Stick (Doble Olisi), Empty Hand (Mano-Mano), Knife Defense (Baraw), Long & Short Weapon (Espada y Daga), Long Stick (Bangkaw), Long Blade/Sword (Sundang).

Three ranges are used: Close Range (Corto), Medium Range (Media Largo), Long Range (Larga Mano).

== Cacoy Doce Pares ==
Cacoy Doce Pares was founded by Ciriaco "Cacoy" Cañete. The system focuses on a close quarter style which is known as "Corto Kurbada" and is characterized by the curving strikes. In 1951 Cañete incorporated concepts and techniques from aikido and judo which is known as "Eskrido". Furthermore the system teaches Double Stick, Stick & Dagger (Olisi y Baraw) and empty handed applications (Suntukan).

In 1981, Cañete travelled to the Kali Academy in Torrance, California to teach Cacoy Doce Pares in the United States.

== Guba Doce Pares International ==
Guba Doce Pares International is a worldwide system founded by SGM Danny Guba, with headquarters in London, UK. Currently there are Guba Doce Pares International schools and practitioners in over 40 countries.

== NARAPHIL ==
The National Arnis Association of the Philippines conducted the First Open Arnis Tournament on March 24, 1979, in Cebu City and the First National Invitational Arnis Tournament on August 19, 1979, in Manila. In both tournaments, Doce Pares emerged as Champion when one stick technique was applied in the Masters Division and most of the other divisions.

During the Third National Arnis Tournament in Cebu City, March 16, 1985, the Doce Pares contestants made a clean sweep of all championship awards in all categories – Openweight, Heavyweight, Middleweight and Lightweight. Most runner-up honors also went to Doce Pares practitioners. Such was the reputation of invincibility of Doce Pares contestants that in the Fourth National Arnis Tournament, which took place in Bacolod, on July 26, 1986, Doce Pares officers and members were invited only as observers and officials, not as contestants. Since its founding, Doce Pares has enjoyed a special reputation among Philippine martial arts organizations as the developer and innovator after adaptating newest styles and techniques.

== See also ==
- Modern Arnis
- Balintawak Eskrima
