= Modern Arnis =

Filipino fighting arts system

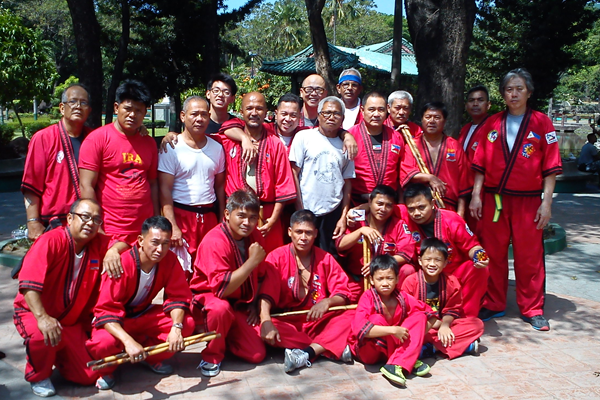
- Modern Arnis group at Rizal Park with Grandmaster Rodel Dagooc
- Also known as: Arnis
- Focus: Stick fighting; Sword fighting; Knife fighting; Unarmed combat
- Country of origin: Philippines
- Creator: Remy Presas
- Parenthood: Arnis, jujutsu, karate, Judo, Karate, possibly Silat
- Olympic sport: No

Modern Arnis is the system of Filipino fighting arts founded by Remy Presas as a self-defense system. His goal was to create an injury-free training method as well as an effective self-defense system in order to preserve the older Arnis systems. The term Modern Arnis was used by Remy Presas' younger brother Ernesto Presas to describe his style of Filipino martial arts; since 1999 Ernesto Presas has called his system Kombatan. It is derived principally from the traditional Presas family style of the Bolo (machete) and the stick-dueling art of Balintawak Eskrima, with influences from other Filipino and Japanese martial arts.

Arnis is the Philippines' national martial art and sport, after President Gloria Macapagal Arroyo signed the Republic Act. No. 9850 in 2009. RA 9850 is a consolidation of House Bill No. 6516 authored by South Cotabato Rep. Arthur Pingoy Jr., and Senate Bill No. 1424 authored by Majority leader Juan Miguel Zubiri with the help of Richard Gialogo. RA 9850 is expected to help propagate arnis as a modern martial art/sport that can compete with popular non-Filipino arts, i.e. taekwondo, karate and judo. The Act mandates the Department of Education to include the sport as a Physical Education course.

== History ==
Remy Presas studied his family's system from an early age. He went on to study the Japanese systems of Shotokan Karate and Judo, achieving high rank in each; but he simultaneously studied a variety of other Filipino systems, most notably Venancio Bacon's Balintawak. Beginning with a small gymnasium in Bacolod in the 1950s, he attempted to spread the art to the local youth as both a cultural legacy and a form of physical development or sport. He taught the art at the University of Negros Occidental-Recoletos. His desire to reinvigorate interest in his country's traditional martial art grew over time, and he began making modifications and improvements to what he had learned. In 1969, he moved to Manila at the request of a government official, and formed the Modern Arnis Federation of the Philippines. He was assisted by individuals such as those who now are on the Modern Arnis Senior Masters Council: Rodel Dagooc, Jerry dela Cruz, Roland Dantes, Vicente Sanchez, Rene Tongson, and Cristino Vasquez. He continued to develop and spread his art, including via books, until political considerations forced him to relocate to North America.

There he met Wally Jay, George Dillman, and other artists who influenced his development of the art of Modern Arnis. In particular, many locks from Small Circle Jujitsu were added to Modern Arnis. The art continued to grow and change, in technique and in emphasis, though it always retained a focus on the single stick and on general self-defense. Those who trained with Remy Presas in the United States in the 1970s and early 1980s experienced the art differently from those who began training in the late 1990s. Throughout the 1980s and 1990s he traveled extensively for seminars – the principal form of instruction in the system was through weekend training camps held around the world but especially in the U.S. – and produced books and videos. During the 1990s Wally Jay, Remy Presas (Modern Arnis), and George Dillman (Kyusho Jitsu) traveled together throughout the United States and worldwide promulgating small-circle jujitsu. At that time many elements of Small Circle JuJitsu were well integrated into Modern Arnis.

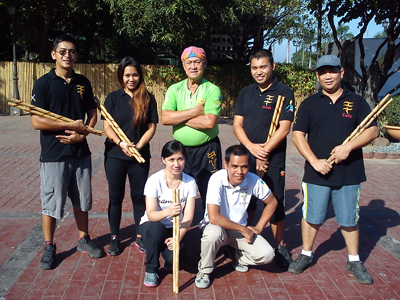
Grandmaster Vicente Sanchez with students at Rizal Park

During this time he experimented with different forms of titles and leadership in the art. The International Modern Arnis Federation Philippines would come to be the lead Modern Arnis organization in the Philippines, and the Deutscher Arnis Verband of Germany would be the lead organization in Europe. In the United States, the International Modern Arnis Federation (IMAF) was the principal organization as far as certification was concerned, but the founder created a variety of titles that indicated some level of organizational or leadership authority in the art (as opposed to titles such as guro ("teacher") or Punong Guro ("Head teacher") that recognized teaching and/or technical ability). Most prominent among these titles were Datu, meaning a chieftain or leader, awarded in this order to Shishir Inocalla, Kelly Worden and Ric "Bong" Jornales (of Arnis Sikaran) (all in the 1980s), Dieter Knuettel (1996), Tim Hartman and David Hoffman (both in 2000); and Master of Tapi-Tapi, awarded to Jeff Delaney, Chuck Gauss, Jim Ladis, Gaby Roloff, Randi Schea, Ken Smith, and Brian Zawilinski. The title of Master of Tapi Tapi denotes those who have attained the high level of proficiency in Modern Arnis' Tapi - Tapi. The Datus were expected to take leadership roles that might see them move in different, and perhaps less conventional, directions. Through 2001, however, the art remained largely united under the founder.

In the wake of the 2001 death of Remy Presas, there was a splintering of the remaining leadership of Modern Arnis. The IMAF, the organization of record for North American Modern Arnis practitioners, split into two subgroups, one headed by Randi Schea and one headed by Jeff Delaney; the remaining five Masters of Tapi-Tapi associated with the group led by Randi Schea. Remy Presas' son Remy P. Presas and his siblings formed a group following his father's death, and Tim Hartman and Dieter Knuettel increased the independence of their organizations (the WMAA and DAV, respectively). In 2012 Randi Schea and Jim Ladis retired from the IMAF. In 2018, Brian Zawilinski, the senior-most Master of Tapi Tapi, resigned from the IMAF and operates independently worldwide.

In many ways, the situation is analogous to what occurred in the Jeet Kune Do and American Kenpo communities following the deaths of their popular and charismatic founders. In particular, the question of how high-ranking arnisadors should test for higher rank has been settled by different organizations in different ways. In some cases this has caused controversy. The art is healthy and continues to attract students.

Current practitioners of Modern Arnis or arts strongly influenced by Modern Arnis who are prominent include: Bambit Dulay, Rene Tongson, Tim Hartman, Tye Botting, Chuck Gauss, Ken Smith, Kelly Worden, Rodel Dagooc and Dieter Knuettel. Modern Arnis continues to be taught worldwide.

== Training ==
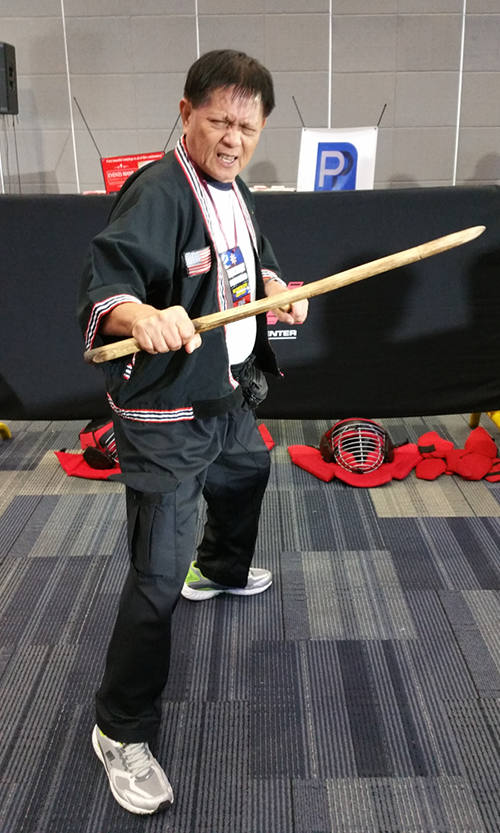
Grandmaster Jerry Dela Cruz of Arnis Cruzada and Modern Arnis

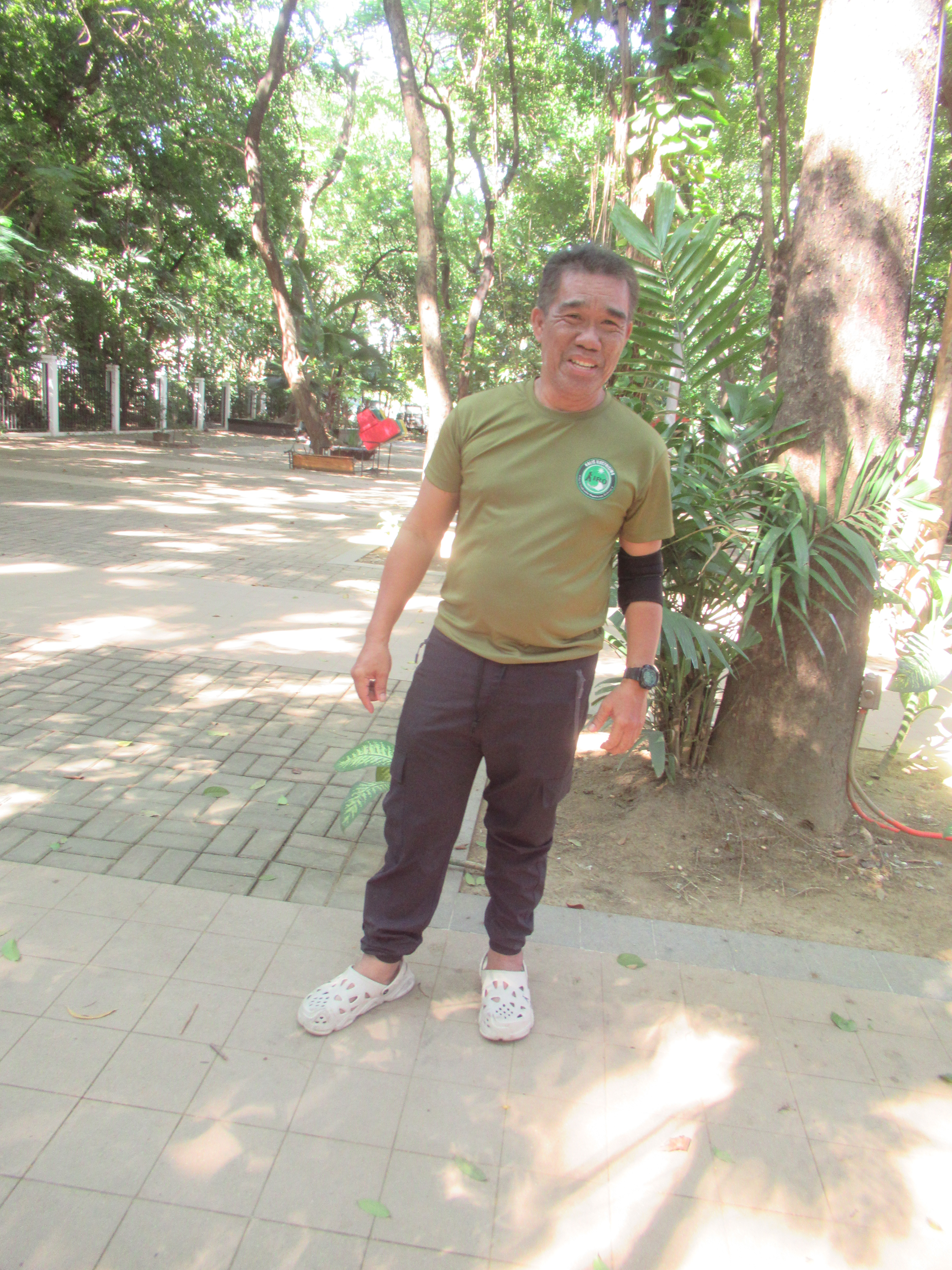
Arnold Narzo (Kalis Ilustrisimo Chief Instructor at the Arroceros Urban Forest Park)

One of the characteristics of Filipino martial arts is the use of weapons from the very beginning of training and Modern Arnis is no exception. The primary weapon is the rattan stick, called a cane or baston (baton), which varies in size, but is usually about 28 inches (71 cm) in length. Both single and double stick techniques are taught, with an emphasis on the former; unarmed defenses against the stick and against bladed weapons (which the stick is sometimes taken to represent) are a part of the curriculum.

It is said that, originally, the cane was considered sacred by practitioners (Arnisadores), and therefore an arnis practitioner was expected to hit his cane at the hand or forearm of his sparring partner and not at the latter's cane. This had the advantage of being the preferred method in actual combat, referred to as "defanging the snake", that is, making the opponent drop his weapon so that he is less of a threat. However, it discouraged many would-be practitioners who found this training too painful and injury-inducing. The result was that the Filipino martial arts became in danger of dying out; in most areas of the Philippines, Japanese martial arts such as Karate and Judo were much more popular than the indigenous systems. Remy Presas' modernization of the training method was intended to help preserve the Filipino martial arts. He taught the method of hitting cane-on-cane during practice, which attracted more newcomers to the art and allowed the art to be taught in the Philippines' school system. "Defanging the snake" remains a principle of Modern Arnis, however, and in practical application, one would typically strike the hand or arm. The technique can be used empty-handed, where it is known as "limb destruction".

Training covers empty-hand self-defense (striking, locking, throwing, etc.) as well as the trademark single and double stick techniques of the Filipino martial arts. Other aspects of the art include espada y daga (sword and dagger fighting), sinawali (double stick weaving patterns), and tapi-tapi (locking drills with the stick). In addition to partner drills, Modern Arnis includes the use of anyo (kata), solo forms both with and without the stick. Emphasis is placed on fitting the art in with a student's previous training ("the art within your art"), smoothly reacting to changing situations in the fight ("the flow"), and countering the opponent's attempt to counter strikes directed at him ("tapi-tapi"). Practitioners are called arnisadors or Modern Arnis players.

In addition to its Filipino influences, elements of Judo, Shotokan Karate, and Wally Jay's Small Circle Jujutsu appear in the system.

== Belt ranks ==
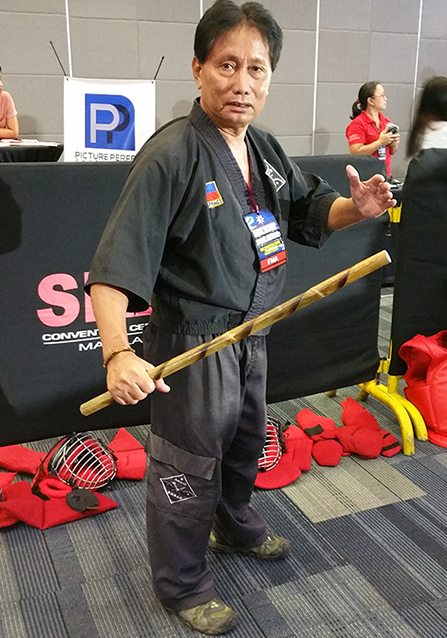
Grandmaster Pepito Robas of Otsotiros Baston Arnis System and Modern Arnis

Modern Arnis uses a ranking system similar to the Dan ranks used in Karate and other Japanese systems. There are some minor variations between organizations as to the exact number of belts. There are 10 or 11 black belt ranks in Modern Arnis, depending on the organization. They are numbered in Tagalog:

1. Isa (pronounced as i-sah; which literally means "one")
2. Dalawa (pronounced dah-la-wah; literally "two")
3. Tatlo (pronounced as tat-loh; literally "three")
4. Apat (pronounced as Ah-pat; literally "four")
5. Lima (pronounced as li-mah;literally "five")
6. Anim (pronounced as ah-neem; literally "six")
7. Pito (pronounced as pi-toh; literally "seven")
8. Walo (pronounced as "wah-loh"; literally "eight")
9. Siyam (pronounced as si-yam or shahm; literally "nine")
10. Sampu (pronounced as sam-pu; literally "ten")

Many groups use a "zero-degree" black belt rank as a probationary stage that comes before Isa. The actual name of the ranks is gender-specific. For men the rank is referred to as Lakan (Tagalog for nobleman) while for women it is referred to as Dayang (Tagalog for lady). Thus, a first degree black belt in Modern Arnis would be referred to as either a Lakan Isa or a Dayang Isa, depending on his or her gender. The "zero-degree" rank, if used, is referred to as simply Lakan or Dayang. The black belt is traditionally bordered with red; however, some groups use a plain black belt.

In addition to rank, titles such as Datu, Commissioner, Master of Tapi-Tapi, Senior Master, Punong Guro, etc., have occasionally been granted to certain high-ranking individuals. The title Guro is typically given to all Lakans and Dayangs.

== Organizations ==
Modern Arnis is perpetuated worldwide and some of the countries where the art is most popular are the Philippines, the United States, Canada, and Germany, but there are practitioners in many other nations as well. There are numerous organizations that continue to spread the art of Modern Arnis, to include (in alphabetical order) DAV (Germany), IMAF (US & Germany), IMAFP (Philippines) and the WMAA (Global).

== See also ==
- Kombatan
- Balintawak Eskrima
- Doce Pares
- Arnis
- Filipino Martial Arts
