= Talibong =

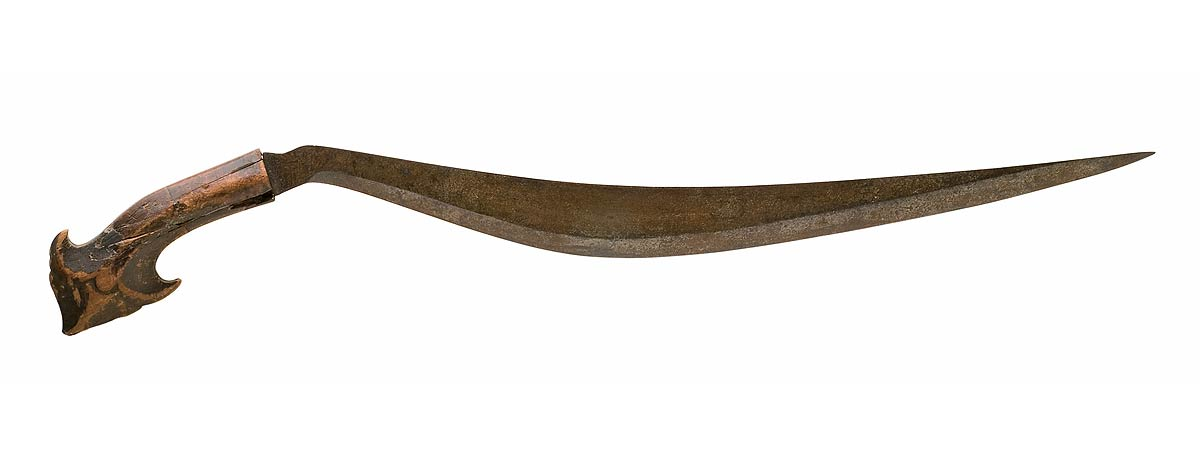
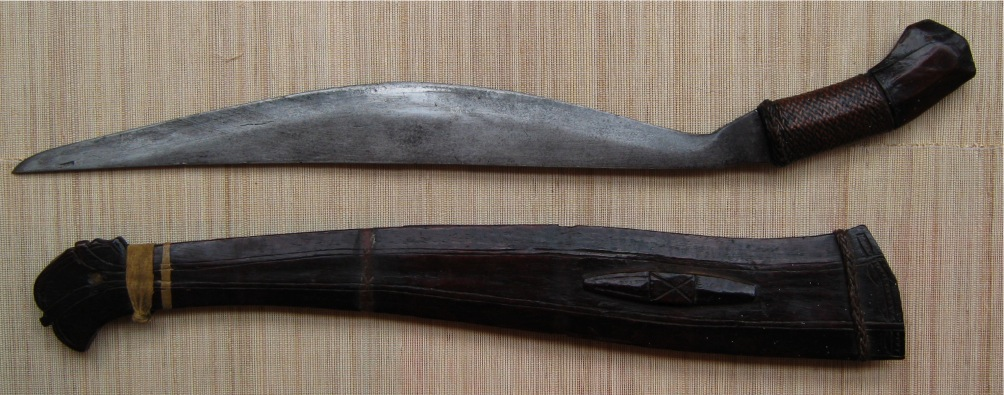
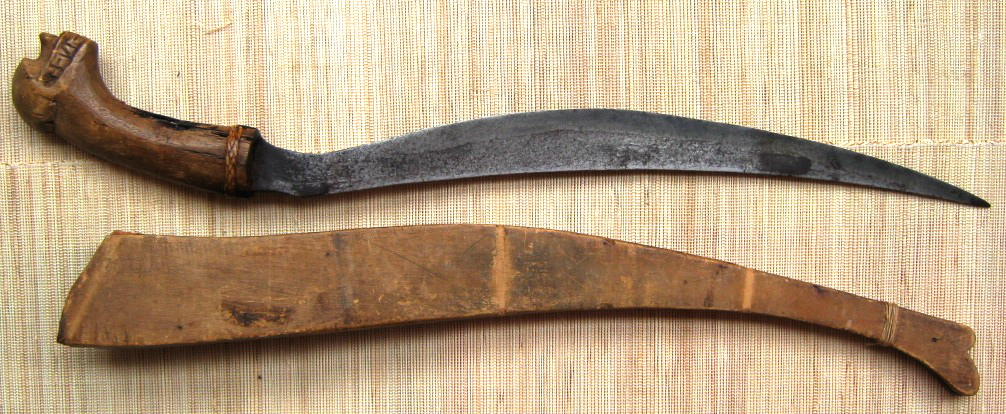
- Top: A talibong sword with a three-petaled flower hilt from the Macao Museum of Art; Midde: A short talibong with a rattan-wrapped hilt, c. early 20th century; Bottom: A talibong sword with a hilt in the shape of a bakunawa head (a mythical moon-eating dragon), c. early 20th century
- Type: Sword, knife
- Place of origin: Visayas, Philippines

Service history
- Used by: Visayans

Specifications
- Length: 40 to 60 cm (16 to 24 in)
- Blade length: 30 to 50 cm (12 to 20 in)
- Blade type: Chisel-ground blade; tapered, curving, single-edge
- Hilt type: Hardwood, Bone, Rattan, Horn
- Scabbard/sheath: Fiber-lashed Wood

The talibong (also spelled talibon, taribong, or talebong), is a type of single-edged sword or knife, traditionally used by the Visayans of the Philippines, particularly in the islands of the Eastern Visayas and Central Visayas. Talibong are also known as garab (also a term for native Filipino sickles), pira (a name shared with the Yakan pirah), or piru.

The size of the sword can vary greatly, from short stubby knives to long slender swords. The sword's profile is characteristically S-shaped (sigmoid) with two curves formed by the edge of the blade itself and the hilt. The blade has a thick and heavy spine (usually straight or slightly curved), has a beveled edge that curves sharply in the middle (where the blade is widest), and tapers to an elongated slightly upturned sharp point. The front half of the blade from the widest point is usually slightly longer than the half towards the hilt. The hilt curves sharply inward into a pistol-grip, for slashing and thrusting when used in combat. In some variants, the hilt extends even further inward with a long carved spike, forming a U-shape and functioning as a sort of hand guard. The scabbards are usually made of wood and follow the shape of the blade but with a sharply upturned end. The hilt and scabbards often come in a wide variety of forms, with common examples being carved cockatoo heads, three-petaled flowers, bakunawa heads, and human or other animal heads, among others.

Talibong swords were iconic weapons of the Pulajanes groups in the islands of Samar, Leyte and Biliran during the Philippine-American War.

The name "talibong" is also confusingly applied to different weapons in other ethnic groups of the Philippines. Among the Aklanon people, it refers to the sword also known as sanduko (or binangon). Among the Kapampangan and Bagobo people, it refers to the wide-tipped sword, the kampilan. Among the Moro peoples, some sources use the term to refer to the panabas, a type of battle axe or executioner's sword. Talibong is also a generic term for swords or spears in the Tagalog language.

== See also ==
- Pirah
