= Danny Guba =

Daniel "Danny" Guba
- Born: August 11, 1952 (age 74)
- Nationality: Filipino
- Style: Eskrima, Doce Pares
- Trainer: Magdalino Nolasco, Ciriaco Canete, Filimon Canete, Bonifacio Uy, Vincente Carin, Dionisio Canete
- Rank: 12th Dan Black Belt in Doce Pares Eskrima; Head of Doce Pares for Europe and United Kingdom; Head of Guba Doce Pares International; President of World Filipino Martial Arts Federation (WFMAF); 6th Dan Black Belt in Shotokan Karate; 1st Dan Black Belt in Judo
- Years active: 1964 – present

Other information
- Occupation: Martial Artist, Eskrimador, Instructor, Head of Doce Pares UK & Europe, President of World Filipino Martial Arts Federation (WFMAF)

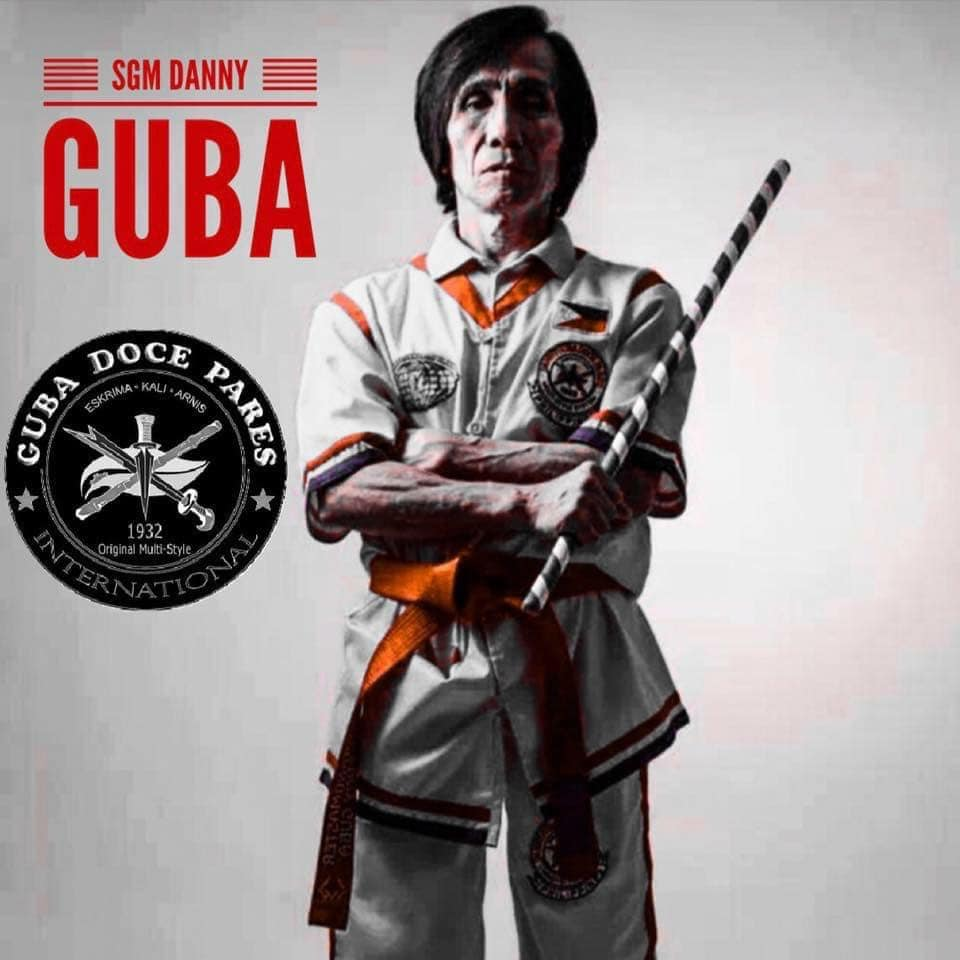
SGM Danny Guba

Supreme Grand Master (SGM) Daniel "Danny" Guba (born August 11, 1952) is a Filipino martial artist and a leading practitioner of Eskrima-Kali-Arnis. Guba is a 5 time World Eskrima Kali Arnis Federation (WEKAF) World Champion and the founder of his own style of Doce Pares Eskrima, namely Guba Doce Pares.

== Career ==
Guba began his training in Eskrima in 1964 in Cebu, Philippines. Guba learned from prominent practitioners of Eskrima. From 1964 to 1986, Guba trained under Magdalino Nolasco, Filimon Canete, Dionisio and Ciriaco Canete; from 1979 to 1988 under Bonifacio Uy; and from 1981 to 1988 under Vicente Carin.

=== Guba Doce Pares ===
Guba is the founder of Guba Doce Pares International and the highest authority of Doce Pares Eskrima in the United Kingdom and Europe. He is the head of the organisation and is currently based in London, UK.

Guba hosts full-contact single-stick sparring, double-stick sparring, corto (close range) sparring, knife-sparring and Sayaw (form) tournaments. The two major Guba Doce Pares International tournaments in the United Kingdom are 'Quest for the Best' and the 'Apex International Open' which is held every two years at SENI, the world's biggest martial arts expo, in the O2 Soccerdome and ExCeL London.

=== World Filipino Martial Arts Federation (WFMAF) ===
As of February 2018 SGM Danny Guba is the President of the World Filipino Martial Arts Federation (WFMAF).

=== Descendants ===
SGM Danny Guba, over his decades of teaching Filipino Martial Arts, has chosen 'Descendants', who are outstanding students who have been selected to carry on and promote the Guba Doce Pares International system. The final list will consist of 24 students, or 'twelve pairs'. As of 2025, the list is as follows:

- 1. Brian Simpson
- 2. Nimesh Desai
- 3. Joe Agoncillo
- 4. Gordon Rainbird
- 5. Paul Tennet
- 6. Leonardo Pereira
- 7. Paul Cox
- 8. Ian Hawkins
- 9. Fausto Mangiarotti
- 10. Daniel O'Keeffe
- 11. Peter Huynh
- 12. Andrew Styliano
- 13. Ronald Joseph
- 14. Mark Sagpen Watan
- 15. Miguel Arroyo
- 16. Geran Salvador
- 17. Darren Guba
