= Roland Dantes =

Filipino actor, bodybuilder and martial artist

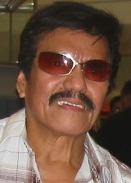
- Born: Rolando Pintoy Dantes; June 15, 1940
- Died: March 16, 2009 (aged 68); Philippines
- Occupations: Actor, Eskrimador (Grandmaster)
- Known for: Mr. Philippines, Mr. Universe, Mr. World

Rolando Pintoy Dantes (June 15, 1940 – March 16, 2009) was an actor, champion bodybuilder and Filipino martial artist who trained with Remy Presas for over 30 years.

He was born on June 15, 1940, in the Philippines.

He has also trained with other martial arts masters, such as Cacoy Canete and Edgar Sulite. He worked several years as a police officer before becoming an actor.

He is one of the best-known Philippine actors. He has had leading roles in different films including "The Pacific Connection" and "Arnis: The Sticks Of Death." In addition, Dantes was a bodybuilder who won the "Mr. Philippines" title five times between 1971–1980 and placed in competitions for the titles "Mr. Universe" and "Mr. World".

Grand Master Dantes died on March 16, 2009. He was 68.

In recognition of his lifelong contributions to the discipline, Dantes was posthumously inducted into the 1st Philippine Martial Arts Hall of Fame on April 23, 2012.

== Filmography ==
Year	Title	Role	Notes
1974	The Pacific Connection	Ben	
1977	Banta ng Kahapon		
1979	Durugin si Totoy Bato		
1981	Uhaw na dagat	Golem	
1981	Cuatro y medya		
1981	Ermitaño		
1982	My Only Love		
1982	Amuyong		
1982	Ninong		
1983	Dalmacio armas		
1983	Urriqueia: Matigas na bakal		
1983	Kato: Son of the Dragon		
1983	Dugong buhay	Lakas	
1983	Tulume Alyas Zorro		
1984	Moises ang sugo		
1984	Donato Akakdang bato		
1984	Kumander Sumulong		
1986	Forgotten Warrior	Stick Fighter	
1986	Kahit sa bala, hindi kami susuko		
1986	Arnis: The Sticks of Death	Johnny Guevero	
1987	Tigershark	Ponsok	
1988	Sgt. Ernesto 'Boy' Ybañez: Tirtir Gang		
1990	Delta Force 2: The Colombian Connection	Ramon's Bodyguard #2	
1993	Angelfist	Bayani	
1993	Live by the Fist	Captain Vargas	
1994	Point of No Return	Korean Bodyguard 1	
1995	Under the Gun	Lee	
2000	Tumbador		
2002	Trojan Warrior	Tanng	(final film role)
2013	The Search for Weng Weng	Interviewee	Documentary interview released posthumously

== See also ==
- Bodybuilding in the Philippines
