= Balintawak Eskrima =

Filipino martial art

Balintawak
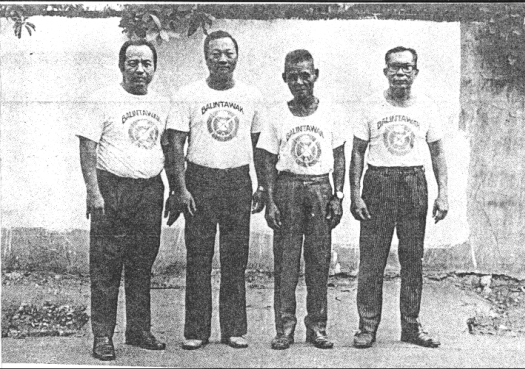
- Original Balintawak club members from left to right: José Villasin, Johnny Chiuten, Venancio Bacon, and Teofelo Velez.
- Also known as: Balintawak Eskrima
- Focus: Stick fighting, Streetfighting
- Country of origin: Philippines
- Creator: Venancio "Anciong" Bacon
- Famous practitioners: Jose Villasin, Teofilo Velez, Timoteo Marangga, Teodorico "Teddy" Buot and Delfin Lopez

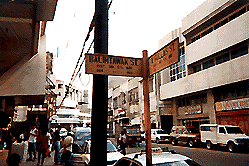
Balintawak Street in Colon Street, Cebu City, Philippines

Balintawak Eskrima or Balintawak Arnis is a Filipino martial art created by Grandmaster Venancio "Anciong" Bacon in the 1950s to enhance and preserve the combative nature of arnis which he felt was being watered down by other styles of Philippine martial arts. It is named after a small street in Cebu where it was founded.

== History ==
In 1932, the Doce Pares Club was formed, composed of eskrimadors from the Saavedra and the Cañete family. This was headed by Lorenzo Saavedra. Venancio Bacon was among the first members of the Doce Pares Club and became one of its best fighters. According to an interview in Bladed Hand, a Filipino documentary about Filipino martial arts, Grandmaster Ciriaco "Cacoy" Cañete said that Bacon was among the best fighters in the Doce Pares Club, second only to "Doring" Saavedra.

In the 1950s, together with Delfin López Timoteo Maranga and others, Bacon established a new club, calling it the Balintawak Street Self-Defense Club. The newly formed club started training in the backyard of a watch shop owned by Eduardo Baculi, one of Bacon's students, in the titular street, a small side street in the Colon St. area. The first elected president of the Balintawak self-defense club 1952 was Attny. Eulalio Estrada “Jose” Causin who worked out with the Doce Pares Club and Boxer.

Ted Buot was the only student of GM Bacon to teach at his club in the back of the watch store. Buot would be teaching and Bacon would show up and Buot would hand him his stick to teach with. When Bacon was done he would hand the stick back to Buot and leave.

During the 1950s and 1960s, eskrimadors from various camps, mainly Doce Pares and Balintawak, tested each other's skills in all-out challenges, sometimes by arrangement and sometimes by ambush, often resulting in injuries and, more rarely, deaths. In one such ambush, Venancio Bacon was caught in the dark while walking to his home in Labangon, and killed his assailant by snapping his spine. Bacon was tried and imprisoned, with the judge ruling that Bacon's fighting skills could be considered a lethal weapon and should have been used with restraint. Upon his release on parole in the mid-1970s, Bacon returned to Cebu and Balintawak. He did not resume leadership, but did regularly attended training sessions conducted by José Villasin and Teofilo Velez until his death a few years later. Per Buot, both Bacon and Buot were always welcome at many of the Doces Pares homes.

== Curriculum ==
Bacon developed single stick techniques. With the help of Villasin he developed and optimized his techniques based upon single stick work. Villasin, under the tutelage of Bacon, developed its basic strike and defense patterns which are now used by most Balintawak practitioners. This pattern forms the basis from which a practitioner can develop basic, semi-advanced, and advanced movements. All techniques must be demonstrated with power, control, and body mechanics. There has been some discussion that Velez brought the idea of the patterns to Villasin and shared it with him. This does not detract at all from the contributions Villasin made within his club and the lineage that comes from his instruction.

The Buot lineage teaches in the same methodology as Bacon originally taught. This is not a claim of being better, it is just a statement as the pattern training above could easily be argued to be a better system to reaching more people. This is mentioned here for historical reference and to list the minority training as referenced above.

In Balintawak, the stick is only used to enhance and train the individual for bare hands fighting, and to achieve perfection in the art of speed, timing and reflexes necessary to acquire defensive posture and fluidity in movement. It aims to harness one's natural body movement and awaken one's senses to move and react. It guarantees its practitioner to experience a revelation in the fundamentals of street fighting. Twelve basic strikes: Left temple, right temple, right floating ribs/kidney, left floating ribs/kidney, navel, genital area, left breast, left knee, right knee, right eye, left eye, crown of head.

=== Systematization ===
Later, some of Bacon's successors soon began to systematize the Balintawak curriculum. One was José Villasin, a self-defense instructor at University of Visayas who grouped the techniques in various categories so his students could master one set of techniques and then move to the next set of related techniques. The GROUPING SYSTEM was taken from the Traditional way of teaching from Venancio "Anciong" Bacon. Jose Villasin also teach the "Traditional Balintawak System" the old method of Balintawak System to few of his chosen student. At this point, several distinct schools of Balintawak emerged teaching the "grouping method".

While those like Villasin taught using the "grouping method", some of Bacon's students and his associates continued to teach in the (Traditional System) old method of random instruction.

Today, there are a number of Balintawak groups teaching different versions of the system. Most instructors use the "grouping" method for teaching the techniques while others continue to teach in the traditional way, as Bacon used to teach.

== Influence ==
The principles and concepts of Balintawak have, however, found their way into many different Filipino martial arts. Most notable is Modern Arnis, founded by Remy Presas who studied Balintawak under Arnulfo Mongcal, who also introduced him to Anciong Bacon. Tat Kun Tao is created by Joe Go, one of Venancio Bacon's earliest students. This is an unarmed form of Balintawak with influences from Chinese martial arts such as Tai Chi and Five Ancestors Boxing.

== Gallery ==
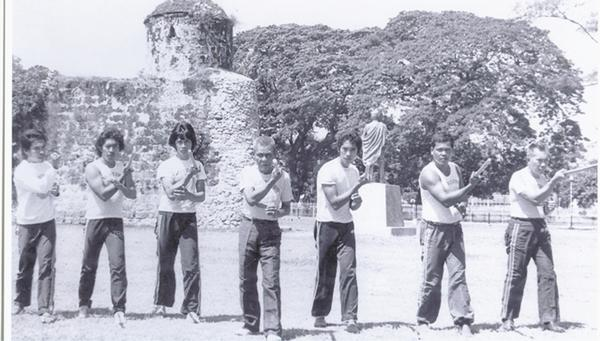

== See also ==
- Arnis
- Doce Pares
