= Filipino martial arts =

Fighting methods devised in the Philippines

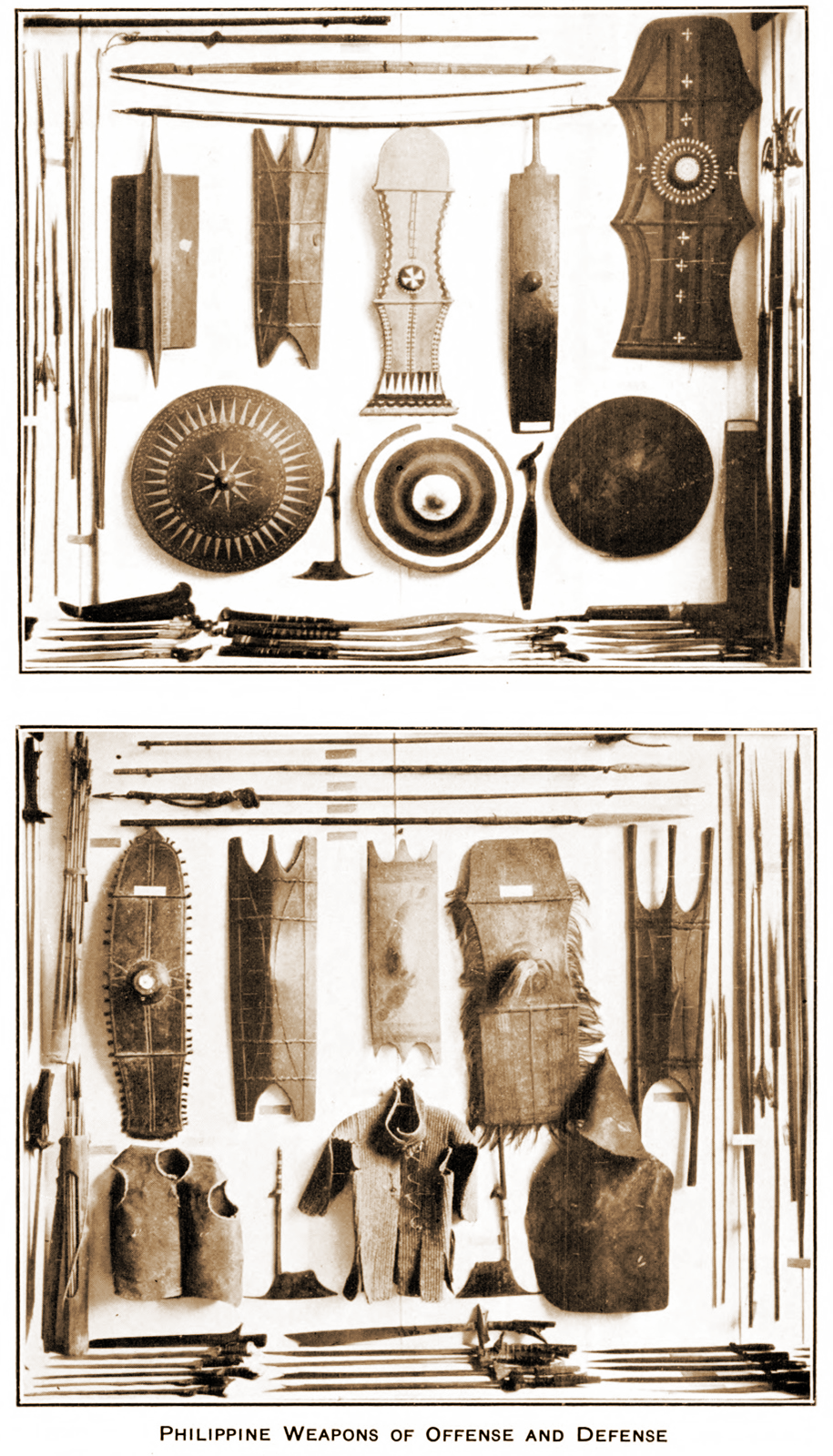
"Philippine Weapons of Offense and Defense" - plate 1, Krieger Collection, United States National Museum

Filipino martial arts (FMA; Filipino: Sining panlaban ng Pilipinas) refer to ancient and newer modified fighting methods devised in the Philippines. It incorporates elements from both Western and Eastern Martial Arts; the most popular forms of which are known as Arnis, Eskrima, and Kali. The intrinsic need for self-preservation was the genesis of these systems. Throughout the ages, invaders and evolving local conflict imposed new dynamics for combat in the islands now making up the Philippines. The Filipino people developed battle skills as a direct result of an appreciation of their ever-changing circumstances. They learned, often, out of necessity on how to prioritize, allocate and use common resources in combative situations. Filipinos have been heavily influenced by a phenomenon of cultural and linguistic mixture. Some of the specific mechanisms responsible for cultural and martial change extended from phenomena such as war, political and social systems, technology, and trade and practicality.

Filipino martial arts have seen an increase in prominence due to the influence of several Hollywood movies and the teachings of modern masters such as Venancio "Anciong" Bacon, Dan Inosanto, Roland Dantes, Edgar Sulite, Cacoy Canete, Danny Guba, Mike Inay, Remy Presas, Wilson Pangan Sr. (Grand Master), Ernesto Presas Sr., Doug Marcaida, Ernesto Presas Jr., Carlito A. Lanada, Sr., and Carlos Deleon.

There have been numerous scholarly calls on the inclusion of the many martial arts of the Philippines into the UNESCO Intangible Cultural Heritage Lists. As of 2019, a total of nine elements scattered in eight countries, such as Thailand, Georgia, and Korea, have successfully inscribed their martial arts in the UNESCO list.

== History ==
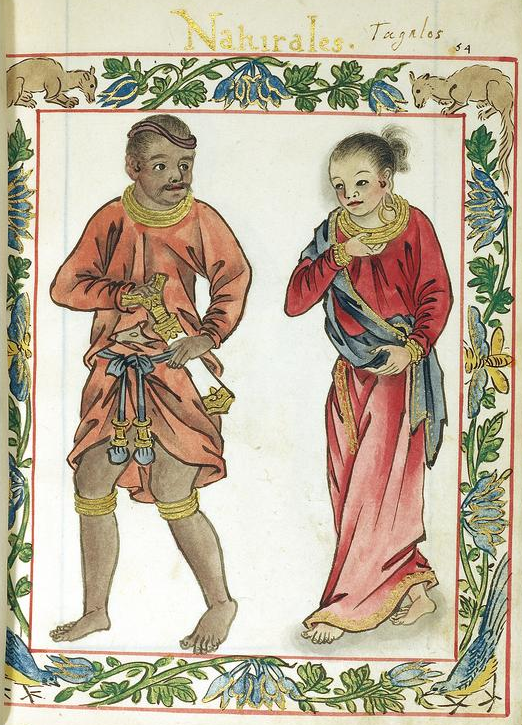
Tagalog man carries a weapon, possibly a Kalis. This is from the Boxer Codex, circa 1590 A.D.

Historically there was no term for "martial arts" in any Philippine language, the Filipino term "sining panlaban" is a loan translation of the English term. Because of the lack of historical accounts and archaeological records that made references and descriptions on the natives' ways of fighting and training in a combat system, it is somewhat difficult for historians and anthropologists to pinpoint the exact year or era when native Filipinos started to codify or drill their personnel in an established fighting system. Filipino martial artists often cite the Battle of Mactan as a historical testament to the existence of Filipino martial arts, but the narrative of the chronicler, Antonio Pigafetta, only described the events of the battle and the culture of the natives superficially. Spanish reports from the late-16th century to the 19th century did not name a method of fighting amongst the natives despite carrying weapons with them all the time nor did they describe any kind of reference of a martial art that was practiced by the natives who were serving in Spanish garrisons all over the islands, though that does not mean that natives could not fight, as human aggression is the primary source of violence which are most likely motivated by constant warfare especially the Sambal, Pampangos, and the Visayans. The earliest description on the natives' fighting methods is in a report by Francisco de Sande in Manila, about natives in Zambales carrying "several daggers around their belts" and men carrying battle-axes in their squadron and some well-placed arquebusiers, but none about describing any kind of formalized drills and training for combat which would define a martial art as archeological discovery and historical accounts on the description of centuries-old weapons does not mean that there was a systemized method of fighting. Another interesting report from 1629 implied that the natives were recently taught how to wield a sword presumably in the Spanish way and in 1764 report by Baltasar Vela who spoke of "drilled Indians" attacking the English in Manila.

In the late 19th century to the early 20th century, the US administration formally introduced boxing in the islands and in the following years in early to mid-20th century, Japanese businessmen introduced and taught Japanese martial arts in the islands, especially Judo, and during World War II it became common for Filipino martial artists to incorporate Japanese martial arts in their respective styles.

Native martial arts that were possibly forerunners to the modern Arnis de Mano started to exist by the 14th century. Arnis is characterized as sabre play that uses a pair of rattan canes or short wooden canes. Ancient Filipinos were considered skilled in dagger and the broad-sword before the Spanish colonization of the Philippines.

Silat is another martial art culturally practiced in Southern Philippines, that was imported there from either Brunei or Malaysia, considering its close proximity with Borneo, and from there to Malaysia. Silat was popular among the royal families of the South and Muslim area of the country. There are also fighting systems such as Sikaran and Kuntaw. Kuntaw is considered on the verge of being extinct. Sikaran is an old style that is popular in the areas around Manila. The competition of Sikaran involved two teams or individuals in the area of a rice paddy in the time of dry season.

Today there are said to be almost as many Filipino fighting styles as there are islands in the Philippines. In 1972, the Philippine government included Filipino martial arts into the national sports arena. The Ministry of Education, Culture and Sports also incorporated them into the physical education curriculum for high school and college students. In recent history, Richardson C. Gialogo and Aniano Lota, Jr. helped the Department of Education (DepEd), former Ministry of Education, Culture and Sports, in the promotion of Arnis in the public schools. The Task Force on School Sports (TFSS) headed by Mr. Feliciano Toledo asked Richard Gialogo and Jon Lota to conduct national, regional and provincial seminar-workshops all over the Philippines under the auspices of the Philippine government. This resulted to the inclusion of Arnis in the Palarong Pambansa (National Games) in 2006. The efforts of the two and Senator Miguel Zubiri resulted in Arnis being declared as the National Martial Art and Sport of the Philippines by virtue of Republic Act 9850 which was signed into law in 2009. Knowledge of the Filipino fighting skills is mandatory in the Philippine military and police.

Filipino martial arts are considered the most advanced practical modern blade system in the world and are now a core component of the U.S. Army's Modern Army Combatives program and used by the Russian Spetsnaz (special forces). The Government of India used Filipino martial arts to train their Para (Indian Special Forces) of Indian Army, National Security Guard, MARCOS of Indian Navy and Commandos of Central Armed Police Forces.

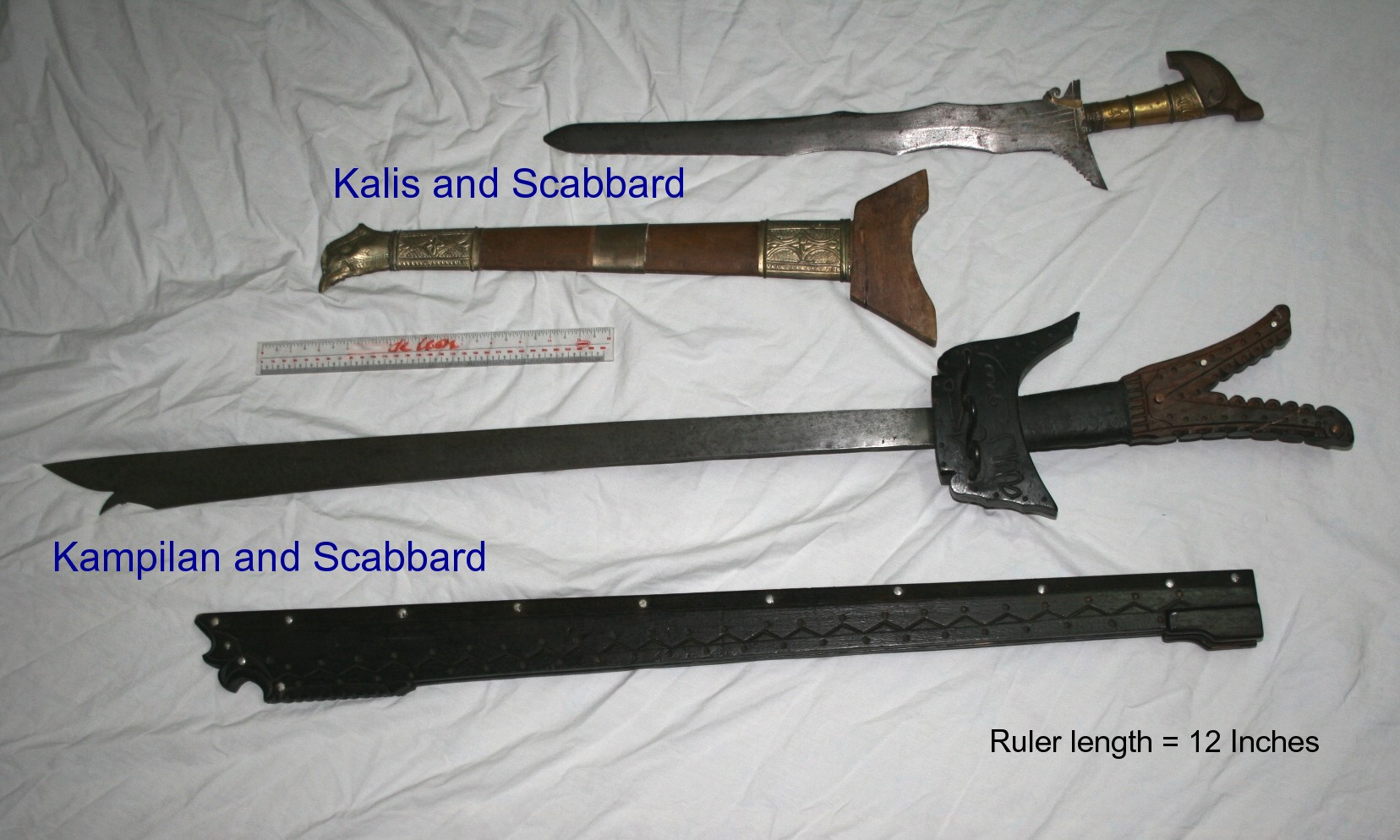
Filipino martial arts weapons

== Weapons ==
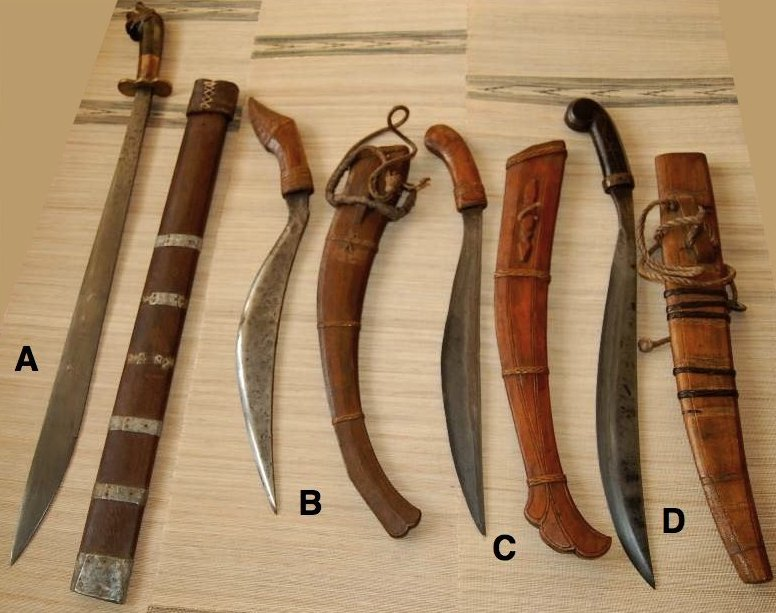
Traditional bolos from the Visayas (ginunting on the left, and three talibongs).

Filipino martial artists are noted for their ability to fight with weapons or empty hands interchangeably and their ability to turn ordinary household items into lethal weapons. Weapons-training takes precedence because they give an edge in real fights, gears students to psychologically face armed opponents, and any object that can be picked up can be used as a weapon using FMA techniques. Empty hand training techniques are translated from the use of the Daga (dagger) or Baston (stick).

Another thing to note is that the Philippines is a blade culture. The Southern Philippines with the Moros were never really conquered by the Spaniards or the Americans; nor the Northern mountains of Luzon with their feared headhunter tribes so they kept their weapons and their fighting skills. For the more "Christianized" provinces and the towns where citizens had been "disarmed", bolos (a cutting tool similar to the machete) and other knife variants are still commonly used for general work (farming in the provinces, chopping wood, coconuts, controlling talahib (sword grass), which could grow higher than roofs if not cut, etc.) and the occasional bloody fight. Production of these weapons still survives and there are a few who still make some. In the province of Aklan, Talibongs are still being made in the remote areas. Until the 80s, balisong knives were still commonly used in the streets of Manila as general purpose pocket knives much like Swiss army knives or box cutters until new laws on allowable kinds of knives made it illegal to carry them in public without a permit or proof that it was a vital to one's livelihood (e.g. Martial arts instructor, vendor). They're still openly sold in their birthplace of Batangas, in the streets of Quiapo, souvenir shops and martial arts stores, wielded by practitioners and street gangs. Thus, even when fighting systems were outlawed by the Spaniards, Filipinos still maintained their centuries-old relationships with blades and blade fighting techniques that survive from ancient times and are still much alive as they have been adapted and evolved to stay relevant and practical in colonial and modern times.

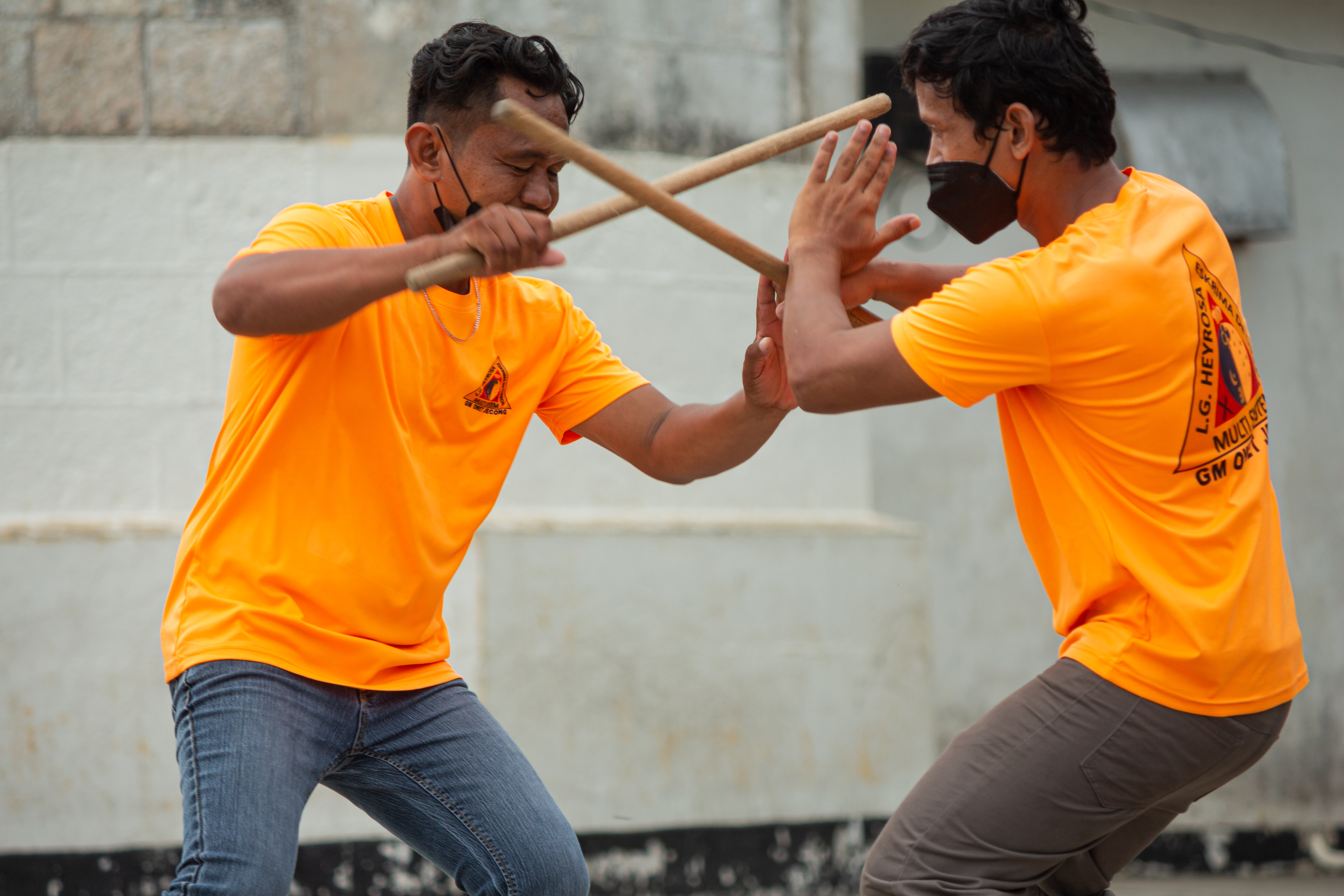
2 opponents armed with sticks facing each other, during Eskrima fight.

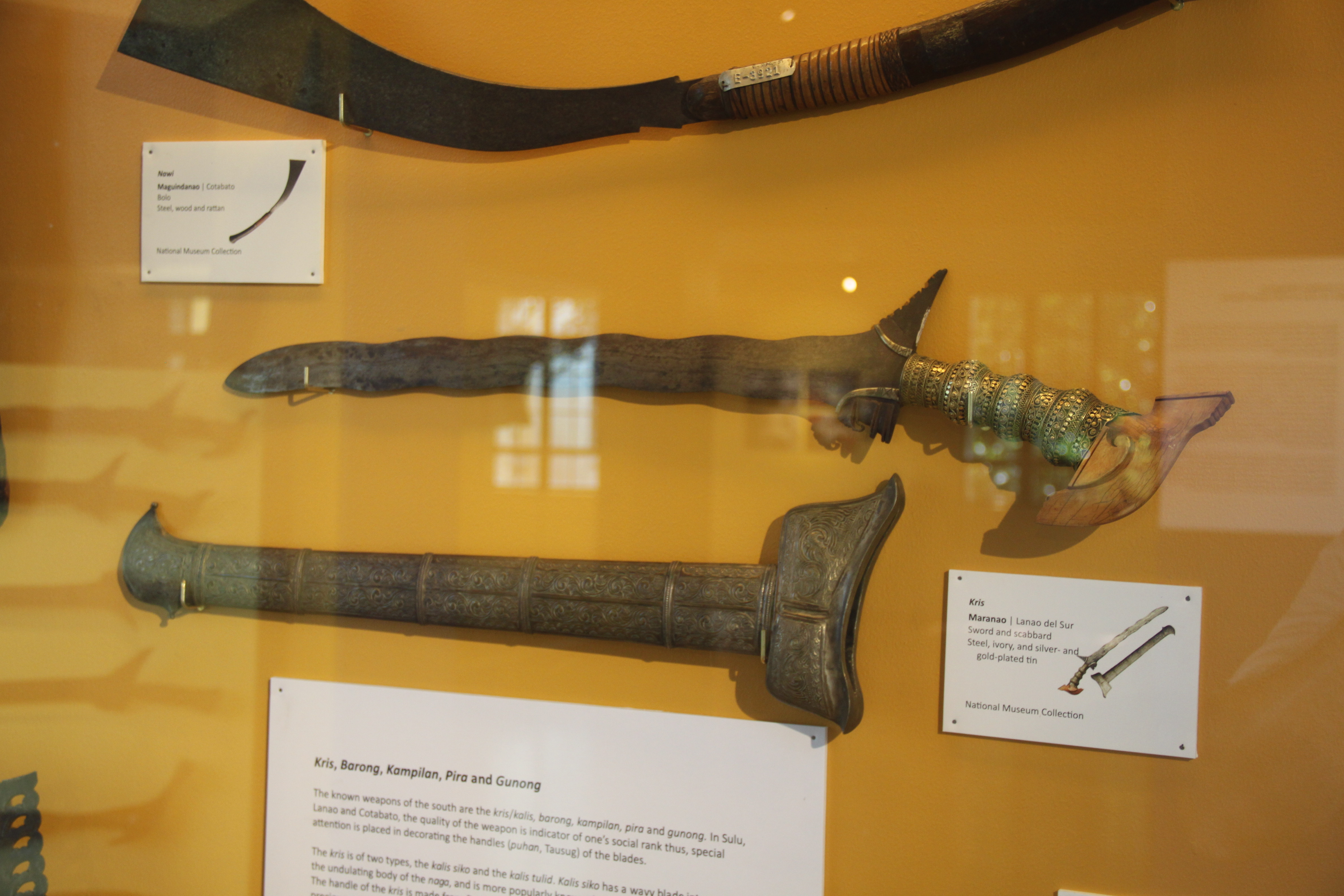
Kris/Kalis at Bangsamoro and Lumad Cultures Gallery, Museum of the Filipino People, Rizal Park, Manila, Philippines

Traditional weaponry varies in design, size, weight, materials, and the way these weapons are used. But because of similar techniques Filipinos can use any object and turned into a weapon by a Filipino martial artist as a force multiplier.

=== Unarmed ===
As mentioned before, Spanish chroniclers did not record nor described any kind of unarmed fighting in the islands, yet one can fight naturally even without practicing any kind of fighting system with or without weapons.

==== Traditional ====
These are the combat practices that have likely existed since antiquity and not born during colonization, but doubts should be raised about sikaran because of insufficient dedicated research on the subject.

- Sikaran: Kicking techniques, also a kick-based separate art practiced in Rizal province. Though marketed as "traditional" or whose origins are traceable back to the pre-Spanish period, there are hardly any reports from the Spanish describing this method of fighting (apart from giving direct translations for the word "kick"). If it did exist back in the pre-Hispanic period, then it is only fitting that it could be a descendant of a pre-historic foot-fighting born out of human aggression.
- Dumog: Filipino style of grappling or just folk wrestling. Traditionally practiced in Antique in Panay, and a recreational activity in their festivals. The Tagalogs refer to this as buno and those among the Igorot people of Northern Luzon as bultong. These terms in general refer to any kind of confrontation that heavily involves grappling with the intent of subduing an opponent. As humans are natural wrestlers, it is likely then that regional forms of this mode of combat already existed in the islands since antiquity.

==== Modern ====
These are the combat systems that were most likely developed or codified in the 20th century (at least the earliest record of it). In the case of mano-mano, in the late-19th or early 20th century during the introduction of modern boxing (see history of the boxing in the Philippines) and yaw-yan which was created by Prof. Napoleon Fernandez in 1972.

- Mano Mano: (From Spanish mano, meaning hand lit. hand to hand) Incorporates punches, kicks, elbows, knees, headbutts, finger-strikes, locks, blocks, grappling and disarming techniques. In some systems, it is called suntukan (also known as pangamot in the Visayas and panantukan in the USA), which is a general term to refer to any kind of brawl.
- Yaw-Yan or Sayaw ng Kamatayan: (Dance of Death) Yaw-Yan closely resembles Muay Thai, but differs in the hip-torquing motion as well as the downward-cutting nature of its kicks, and the emphasis on delivering attacks from long range (while Muay Thai focuses more on clinching). The forearm strikes, elbows, punches, dominating palms, and hand movements are empty-hand translations of the bladed weapons. There are 12 "bolo punches" which were patterned from Arnis.

=== Impact ===
These are the weapons that do not penetrate the flesh but can deliver a fatal damage to an unprotected opponent usually bruises but depending on the body part in contact, can cut through the skin.

- Baston / Olisi: Short sticks, traditionally crafted from rattan or kamagong
- Bangkaw / Tongat: Staff, rod or pole
- Dulo-Dulo: Palmstick
- Tameng: Shield
- Improvised weapons: pens, keychains, keys (push knife grip), umbrellas, rolled-up newspapers/magazines, walking sticks, etc.

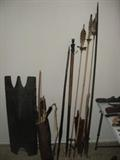
The walking stick in the middle of photo just left of the three arrows and right of the Luzon shield, doubles as an improvised weapon coming apart into two pieces, both with fixed blades on a long and short stick.

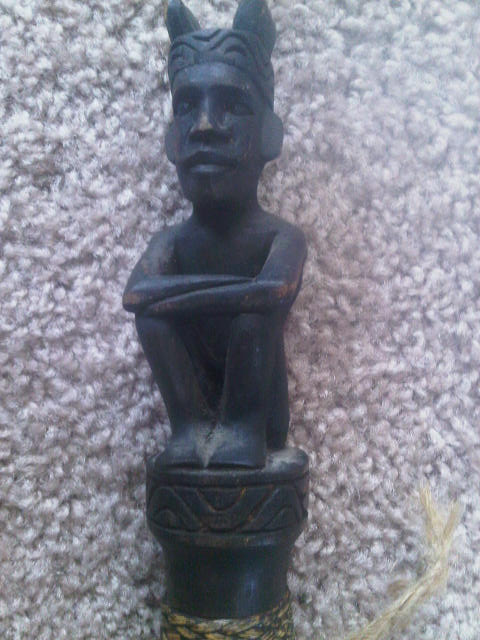
Pictured above is a closer look at the carving of a Negrito man on top of the stick.

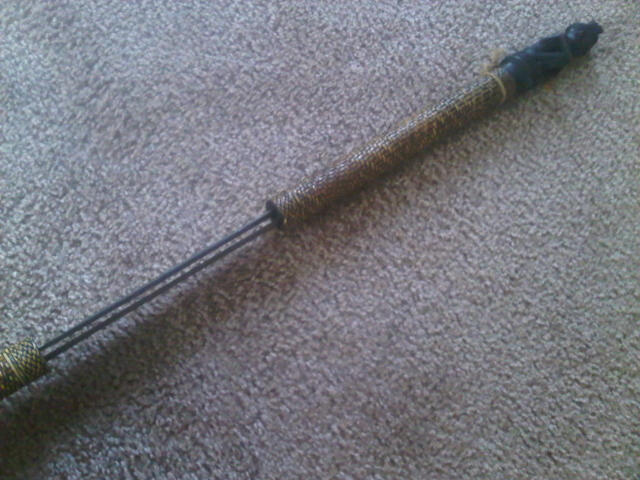
A braid/weave encompasses the top portion of the walking stick to ensure a good grip. While partially unsheathed, the two blades can be seen hidden inside. Very rare from late 19th to early 20th century, beautiful weapon and great example of ingenuity and master craftsmanship of the people.

=== Edged ===
These are the weapons that are designed to penetrate and damage the opponent through wounds and at times, fatally injuring the opponent.

- Daga/Cuchillo: Spanish for dagger and knife respectively. Traditional varieties include the gunong, punyal (from Spanish puñal) and barung or barong
- Balisong: Butterfly knife
- Karambit: Small blade shaped like a tiger claw
- Espada: Spanish for "sword". Includes kampilan, ginunting, pinuti and talibong
- Itak: Bolo used by Tagalog people
- Kalis: Larger, thicker Filipino kris
- Golok: Machete or broadsword used by tribes people
- Sibat: Spear
- Sundang: Single-edged thick short sword
- Lagaraw: Single-edged flexible long sword with a bent tip
- Ginunting: Single-edged flat ground short sword with a double edged sheep's hoof tip. Typically used in matched pairs with Pinunting
- Pinunting: Single edged v-ground short sword with backswept tip. Typically used in matched pairs with Ginunting

=== Flexible ===
Though rare, Filipino Martial Arts also uses flexible weapons. The most popular of which is the bullwhip, the most popular club that uses this is Momoy Cañete's San Miguel Eskrima.

- Latigo: Spanish (sp. látigo) for whip
- Buntot Pagi: Stingray tail
- Lubid: Rope
- Sarong
- Cadena / Tanikala: Spanish and Tagalog (Tanikalâ) respectively for chain
- Tabak-Toyok: Two sticks attached together by rope or chain, similar to nunchaku, but with shorter sticks and a longer chain
- Improvised: Belt, bandana, handkerchief, shirt, towel

=== Projectile ===
- Pana at Palaso: Bow and arrow
- Sibat: Spear
- Sumpit: Blowpipe
- Bagakay: Darts
- Tirador/Pintik/Saltik: Spanish, Cebuano and Tagalog for slingshot respectively.
- Kana (as in Indian Pana Kakana-kana/kakanain kita): Darts propelled by slingshots used by street gangsters
- Lantaka: kerosene-propelled bamboo cannon
- Luthang: gas-powered mini bamboo cannon

== Training ==
=== Signs and symbols ===
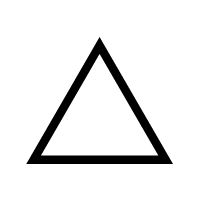
Many Filipino martial art training halls incorporate the triangle into their logo.

The triangle is one of the strongest geometrical structures and stands for strength. Many training halls incorporate the triangle into their logo. It represents numerous underlying philosophical, theoretical and metaphysical principles in the Filipino martial arts. Applications of the triangle are found in defensive and offensive tactical strategies, including footwork, stances, blocking and disarms.

The triangle also represents a trinity of deities. Majority of ethno-linguistic groups in the country are known to have a trinity of ancient gods and goddesses, embodying the number three as sacred.

During training, non-verbal gesture communication and recognition is used in teaching and identification. This sign language, utilizing hand, body and weapons signals; is used to convey ideas, desires, information, or commands.

=== Basic tactical ranges ===
The three combat ranges in the Filipino martial arts are corto (Spanish for close-range), medio (Spanish for medium-range) and largo (Spanish for long-range).

- Hakbang: general term for footwork
- Corto Mano: close range, short movements, minimal extension of arms, legs and weapons, cutting distance
- Serrada: "split step", short range footwork, quick, split action, front and back, low stance. Serrada footwork is the base of a triangular framework methodology
- Largo Mano: long range, extended movements, full extension of arms, legs and weapons, creating distance
- Fraile: short range footwork, hopping action, balanced position, short hop, pushing off from the lead foot
- Retirada: short range footwork, shuffling action, pushing backward by pushing off the lead foot, giving six to eight inches of range per action.
- Banda y banda: side to side action

=== Basic tactical methods ===
Filipino martial arts contain a wide range of tactical concepts, both armed and unarmed. Each art includes several of the methods listed below. Some of these concepts have been taken in isolation to serve as the foundation for entire fighting systems in themselves.

=== Unarmed tactical methods ===
Striking

- Mano Mano, Suntukan, Pangamot, de Cadena, Cadena de Mano, panantukan - empty hands

- Suntukan, Panantukan, Dirty Boxing - empty-hand striking (usually with closed fist) with elbows, headbutts and low kicks

- Paa Paahan, Paa- foot; feet; hoof; foot to; feet to; limb; footstool; toes; legs; base; bottom; corners; Paahan-with large feet;

- Sikaran, kick backward; to kick backward
- Pananjakman, Sipa, patid or sikad - low kicks (heel impact point)

Grappling

- Dumog - wrestling or grappling methods with an emphasis on disabling or controlling the opponent by manipulation of the head and neck. This also refers directly to a wrestling competition on muddy ground.
- Buno

Dirty

- Kinamutay - a sub-section of pangamot that specializes in biting and eye-gouging

- Pa-ak - biting
- Pakug - headbutting
- Sablig - throwing natural eye irritants such as sand to the unwary opponent
- Kawras or kamras - scratching attack to sensitive parts such as the eyes

=== Armed tactical methods ===
- Solo baston - single stick
- Doble Baston - double stick
- Bati-Bati - butt of stick methods
- Dulo-Dulo/Dulo y Dulo - palm stick methods
- Bantay-Kamay, Tapi-Tapi- "guardian hand" or "alive hand", auxiliary weapon used in conjunction with the primary weapon for checking, blocking, monitoring, trapping, locking, disarming, striking, cutting, etc. Examples include the empty hand when using a single stick or the dagger when fighting with sword and dagger
- Baraw - knife and dagger
- Mano y Daga - hand and dagger
- Baston y Daga - stick and dagger
- Daga y Daga - pair of daggers
- Espada y Daga - sword and dagger
- Latigo y Daga - whip and dagger
- Tapon-Tapon - hand thrown knives and weapons tactics

=== Drilling tactical methods ===
- Numerado - striking and blocking by the numbers, refers to the most basic strikes and angles
- Cinco Teros - five strikes, refers to the five most basic strikes and counters
- Doblete - two-weapon blocking and countering method of doubles
- Sinawali - "weaving"; rhythmic, flowing, striking patterns and tactics, utilizing two impact or edged weapons.
- Redonda - circular double-stick vertical downward pattern of six strikes
- Ocho ocho - repeating pattern, strikes and tactics, such as the figure-eight.
- Palis Palis - meeting force with force
- Free flow - live interaction and play, flowing practice, rapid, rhythmic, weapons tactics

=== Technical tactical methods ===
- Abaniko - fanning techniques
- Witik - whipping, snapping back or picking movements
- Lobtik - follow-through strikes; horizontal, vertical, diagonal methods
- Crossada - cross blocking methods, hands and weapons
- Gunting - "scissors"; armed and unarmed scissoring techniques aimed at disabling an opponent's arm or hand
- Lock and block - dynamic countering, attacks based on the striking and blocking methods of the system
- Kadena De Mano - chain of hands, close quarters, continuous, empty-handed combat
- Hubud Lubud - to tie and untie, continuous trapping methods
- Trankada - joint locking and breaking techniques
- Panganaw - disarming techniques

=== Other traditional techniques ===
- Balitok - acrobatic flip or back-flip to evade attacks. This can also be used in combination of kicking to hit opponents.
- Bikil, sapiti or sapid - hitting an opponent's center of gravity to cause imbalance
- Bunal, bangag or puspos - downward striking with a blunt weapon
- Bungot sa kanding - a goatee sported by men to supposedly intimidate or distract an opponent.
- Busdak - throwing an opponent down to the ground
- Dunggab, duslak or luba - stealthy stabbing stroke
- Dusmo - to push an opponent's face to the ground
- Hapak or sumbag - packed punch aimed to take down an opponent
- Hata - fake movement intended to open up opponent's defensive stance
- Ku-ot or kumot - stealthy grabbing and grappling of body parts such as hair
- Kulata - combo punches to disable or overwhelm an opponent
- Laparo or tamparos - slapping using the lower part of the palm
- Lihay - evading attacks
- Lubag - twisting of joints to unnatural position to disable a physically stronger opponent. This includes a lethal twisting and snapping of the neck.
- Luglog - In the Waray language this is to slit the throat
- Sagang - blocking of striking attacks
- Tigbas - slashing and cutting stroke
- Tu-ok - strangling or locking the neck

=== Other traditional techniques, kinamutay-based ===
- Pa-ak - biting
- Pakug - headbutting
- Sablig - throwing natural eye irritants such as sand to the unwary opponent
- Kawras or kamras - scratching attack to sensitive parts such as the eyes
- Siko - to hit with the elbow

=== Esoteric practices ===
- Agimat: A talisman worn to protect against misfortune and increase the chance of victory. Also known as habak or anting-anting.
- Albularyo: A shaman who carries out the initiation ceremony and treats injuries
- Hilot: A traditional system of herbalism, massage and first-aid that was traditionally taught alongside martial arts
- Kulam or Barang : Witchcraft or spell-rituals carried out by witch-doctors. Also known as barang in Visayas.
- Oracion: Special prayers, incantations or mantra that may be recited before battle as a protective armor. This is also used for driving out or summoning spiritual entities. This is usually written in Latin language.

== See also ==
- Arnis/Eskrima/Kali
  - Eskrima weapons
- Modern Arnis
- Suntukan
- Kinamutay
- Sikaran
- Eskrima in popular culture
- Kuntao
- Yaw-Yan
- Pekiti-Tirsia Kali
