= Remy Presas =

Filipino martial artist

Remy Amador Presas
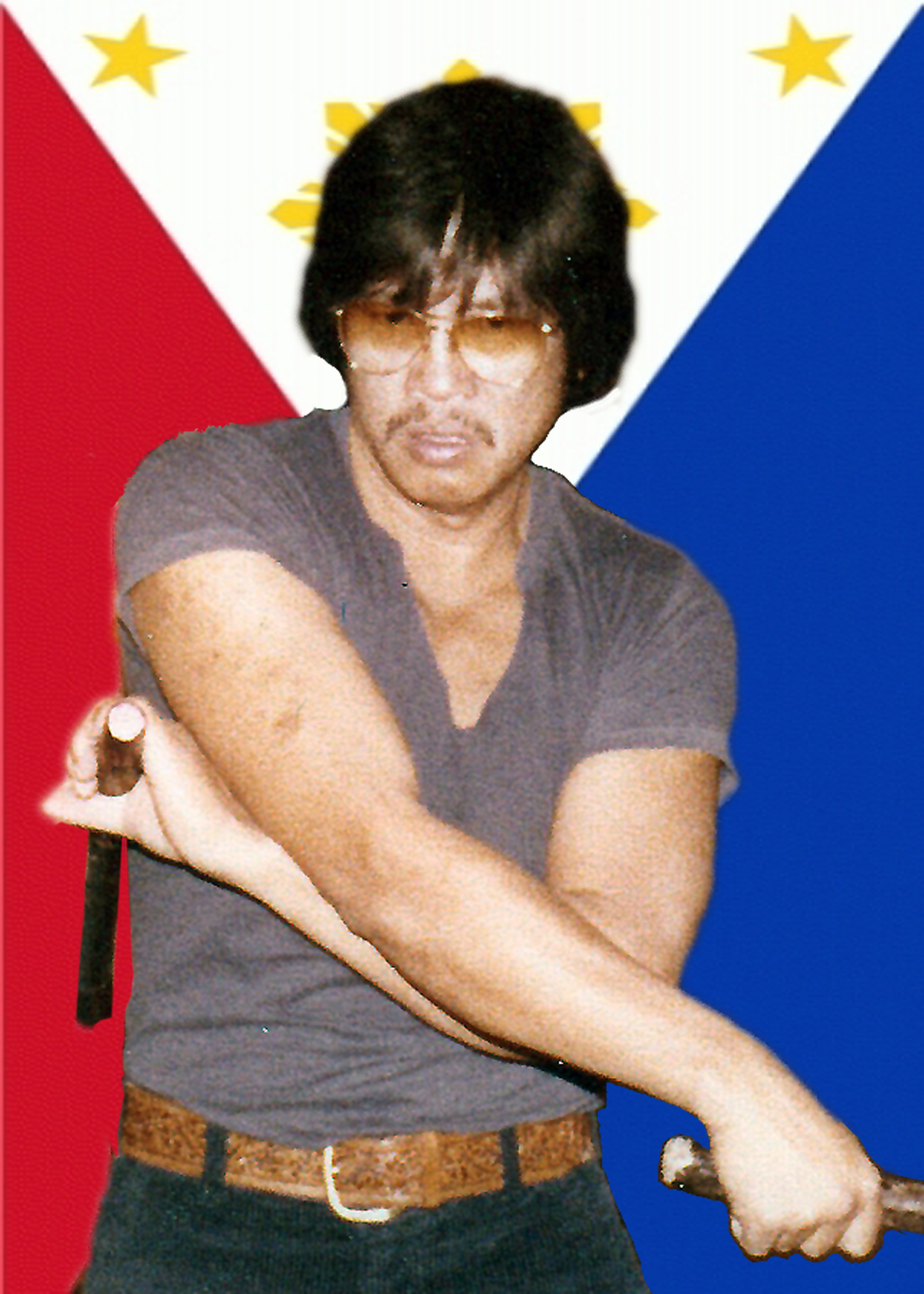
- Remy Presas in the late 1970s
- Born: December 19, 1936; Hinigaran, Negros Occidental, Commonwealth of the Philippines
- Died: August 28, 2001 (aged 64); Victoria, British Columbia, Canada
- Occupations: teacher, martial artist
- Known for: founding Modern Arnis
- Parents: Jose B. Presas (father); Lucia Amador (mother)

Remy Amador Presas (December 19, 1936 – August 28, 2001) was the founder of Modern Arnis, a popular Filipino martial art. Born in the Philippines, he moved to the United States in 1974, where he taught martial arts via seminars and camps. In 1982, he was inducted into the Black Belt Hall of Fame as instructor of the Year. He published several books and videos on Modern Arnis and is recognised as the "Father of Modern Arnis".

== Early life and training ==
Presas was born in the town of Hinigaran, Negros Occidental, Philippines, the son of Jose B. Presas, a businessman, and Lucia Amador.

At the age of six he began studying arnis with his father, then with his grandfather, Leon Presas, as well as his uncle. By the age of fourteen he had had his first stick fighting match with a Sinawali master, who Presas knocked out with one stick hit. He travelled across the Philippine Islands to learn from other masters and to compete in stick-fighting competitions and many street fights. Presas eventually focused on Balintawak Eskrima, but earned a 6th degree black belt in Shotokan Karate and a black belt in Judo. His brothers (Roberto and Enrnesto) also trained in Arnis from a young age. Ernesto A Presas, his younger brother, studied in Japan and learned several martial arts. The brothers learned from their father and grandfather and other relatives a style called "family style", which can still be seen in some elements of "Modern Arnis" and in "Arnis Presas style." Despite similar methods and development, the brothers went slightly different routes. Remy moved to the US while Ernesto stayed in the Philippines, but travelled extensively while teaching Arnis.

In 1966 Remy Presas began developing his own system which he called "Modern Arnis" by identifying the basic concepts of the numerous systems he had learned and merging them. By 1969 Modern Arnis had been approved by the Philippine Amateur Athletic Federation as a regular subject to be taught at the National College of Physical education.

Remy was the Arnis consultant for the 1974 Philippines produced film The Pacific Connection. While working on this film he instructed (and became friends with) US actor Dean Stockwell.

Beginning with a small gymnasium in Bacolod in the 1950s, Remy attempted to spread the art to the local youth as both a cultural legacy and a form of physical development or sport. Remy instituted a ranking system with Modern Arnis to identify the ability level of each student: likas(green belt), likha(brown belt), and lakan(black belt). Lakan encompassed ten degrees. He issued certificates of rank, and began using the title Guro which became widespread throughout all Filipino martial arts circles. Presas developed what came to be known as the "Arnis Uniform" - consisting of loose fitting cotton trousers and a karategi style top low cut at the waist.

In 1982, Presas was inducted into the Black Belt Hall of Fame as instructor of the Year. In 1994, he was again honored by Black Belt as Weapons Instructor of the Year. He was posthumously inducted into the 1st Philippine Martial Arts Hall of Fame on April 23, 2012.

== International Modern Arnis Federation (IMAF) ==
Presas formed the International Modern Arnis Federation (IMAF) in 1970 as the principal organization for the promotion and administration of Modern Arnis in North America. The organization was responsible for maintaining records of promotions and other administrative tasks. After the founders' death in 2001, these duties have since been passed on to MARPPIO (Modern Arnis Remy P. Presas International Organization), which is operated by the Remy's eldest son Remy P. Presas Jr with the aid of his other children and the rest of the Presas Family.

There are two other groups, one headed by Jeff Delaney and often referred to as IMAF-Delaney, and the other formerly headed by Randi Schea, often referred to as IMAF-Schea. The latter group is the larger of the two.

There are other notable Modern Arnis organizations, including International Modern Arnis Federation Philippines (IMAFP), based in the Philippines and led by some of the most senior Filipino masters of Modern Arnis; Arnis International founded by Bruce Chiu; a group headed by Tim Hartman (WMAA); a German group headed by Dieter Knuettel (DAV); and others.

== Private and government sector employment ==
Presas earned a bachelor's degree in physical education and taught the subject at the University of Negros Occidental-Recoletos; because of this he was addressed as Professor Presas, and became known in martial arts circles as "the Professor". He later worked for the Philippine government in the area of physical education, spreading Arnis instruction through the high schools. Presas was forced to leave the country in 1974 because of pressure from certain government officials. He moved to the United States, first staying in the home of his student, Dean Stockwell, and spent the rest of his life living in North America, though he traveled worldwide to conduct seminars.

== Death and legacy ==
Presas died on August 28, 2001, in Victoria, British Columbia, Canada from brain cancer. Since his death, several groups have emerged to carry on instruction in his art. His younger brothers Ernesto Presas and Roberto Presas, as well as several of his children (most notably his eldest son, Remy P. Presas who heads his own Modern Arnis organization), are active in the Filipino martial arts community.

== Personal life ==
Presas was married twice, first to Rosemary Pascual Presas, with whom he had five children, and to Yvette Wong, with whom he had two children.

== Publications ==
- Presas, Remy (1983). Modern Arnis: Filipino Art of Stick Fighting. New York: Black Belt Communications. p. 159. ISBN 978-0-89750-089-0.
- Presas, Remy (2018). Modern Arnis: History & Practice. Virginia: Stirling Bridge Publications. p. 187. ISBN 978-0-99806-540-3.
