= SAS Motors =

Indian agricultural machinery company

SAS Motors Limited
- Type: Public limited company
- Industry: Agricultural machinery
- Founded: 2003; 23 years ago
- Headquarters: Faridabad, Haryana, India
- Products: Tractors; Power Tillers; Power Weeders; Rotovators; Diesel Engines
- Website: sasmotors.net

SAS Motors Limited (Angad) is a public limited company incorporated from April 2003 with the mission of making low-cost agricultural machinery available to Indian farmers. Its flagship product is Angad 240 D tractor. The company is engaged in sourcing, assembling, manufacturing, and marketing of Angad. SAS Motors also provides a range of agricultural equipment.

Launched in November 2004, Angad has been well accepted by the farmers. More than 5000 Angad tractors are running in the Indian soil right now. A survey shows that 90% of the buyers of Angad tractors are first time owners of the tractor; this is in contrast with the tractor industry scenario where about 50% of the sales come from the replacement market.

== Manufacturing strategy ==
SAS Motors Limited follows a model of sourcing standardised mass-produced components available at an economic price and adding a few selected customised components to enhance the efficiency of the tractor and make it suitable for the specific applications in the Indian condition. The cost of transportation of tractor from the factory to the farmers' hand can increase the price of a low-cost tractor significantly. Hence, SAS Motors Limited has adopted the unique model of regional assembly set up and the markets in a region are catered to from the assembly plant closest to that region to keep the transportation cost low.

== Products ==
SAS Motors Limited is currently manufacturing the following products:

- Tractors

Angad 240D, 22 hp Tractor
Angad 350D, 35 hp Tractor

- Power Tillers

Angad 150PT Power Tiller

- Rotovators
- Diesel Engines
- Power Weeders / Mini Tillers

Angad Diesel Hal - A Multi-functional Mini Tiller.
