= Homi (tool) =

Korean traditional farming tool

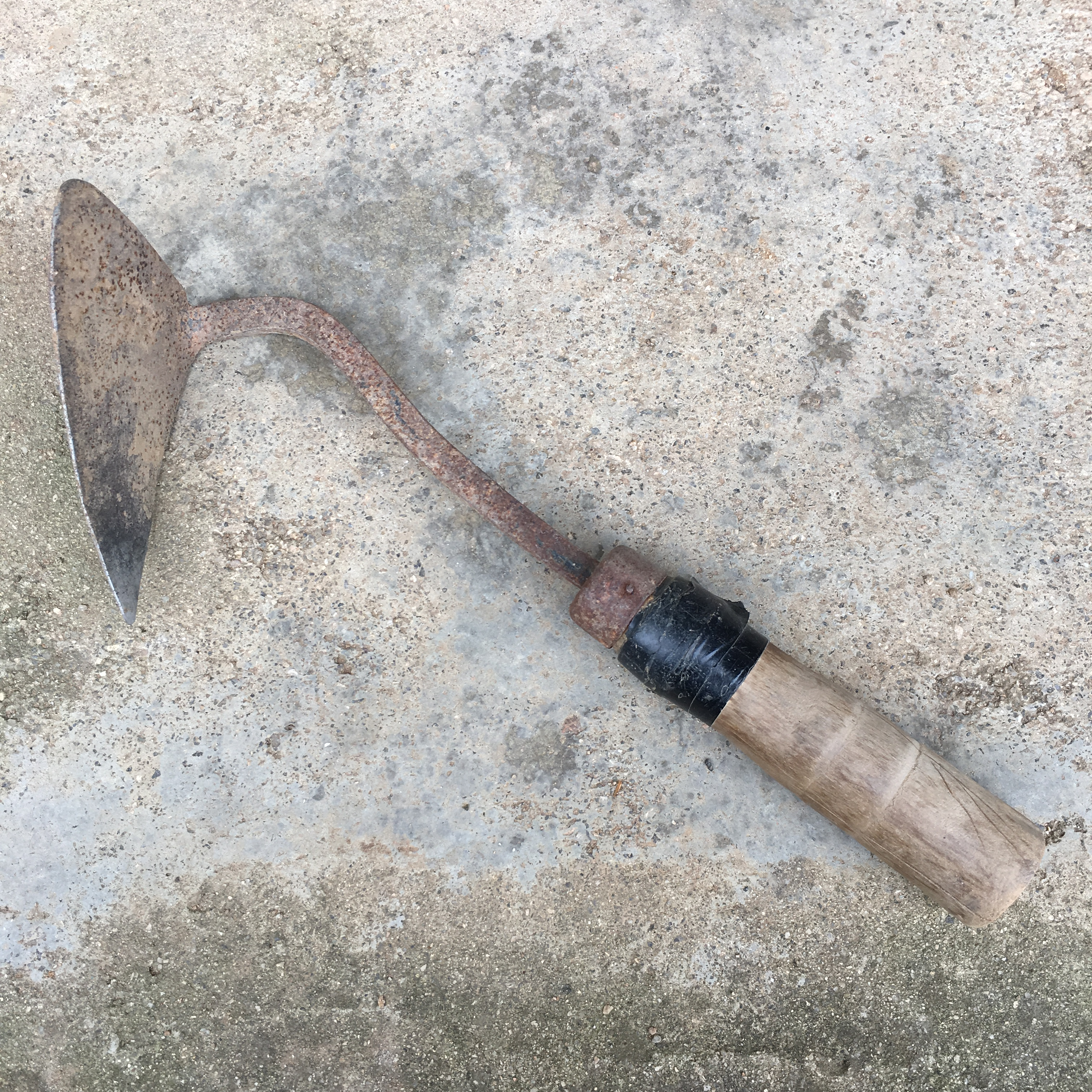
- The pointed part of the triangular shape on the left side is nal (날; lit. 'blade'). The part connecting the handle and the blade is called seumbe (슴베; lit. 'tang'), and the handle is called jaru (자루).

Korean name
- Hangul: 호미
- RR: homi
- MR: homi
- IPA: [ho.mi]

Homi (Korean: 호미), also known as a Korean hand plow, is a short-handled traditional farming tool used by Koreans. It is a farming tool that removes grasses from paddies and fields. It is also used when plowing a rice field, planting seeds, plowing up soil, and digging potatoes in fields. It is a farming tool similar to the hoe. It is an important extension of agriculture from the ancient times because the homi was excavated in the Bronze Age historic site of the Pyeongnam Mangsan Daepyeong-ri and the early Iron Age historic site of Yangpyong, Gyeonggi Province.

Homi is distributed nationwide, but they are characterized by locality. In other words, homi is classified into plowshare-shaped (보습형), sickle-shaped (낫형), and triangle-shaped (세모형) depending on the natural conditions of the local area and the characteristics of agricultural management.

== Design ==
Homi is made of iron and consists of a blade, a tang, and a handle. The blade is the iron plate used to dig or pull grass. The handle is made from a circular piece of wood and is located at the end of the tang. The tang connects the blade to the handle. The shape of the blade is usually an inverted triangle as the lower part is pointed and the upper part is broad.

== Etymology ==
The name of the tool tends to vary according to region. Some common names include homaengi (호맹이), homei (호메이), homu (호무), hommi (홈미), homani (호마니), heome (허매), heomi (허미), and huimi (희미). The name of the tool can also vary depending on its shape, the shingles, the clogs, the shovels, the ear homi, there are gyeongjigi (경지기), makjigi (막지기), gotjigi (곧지기), gwi-homi (귀호미), nal-homi (날호미), pyeong-homi (평호미), dongja-homi (동자호미), bupae-homi (부패호미), byeotsoe-homi (볏쇠호미), susuip-homi (수수잎호미), kkaennip-homi (깻잎호미), yonggang-homi (용강호미), byeorugae (벼루개), gakjaengi (각쟁이), golgaengi (골갱이), and byeokchae (벽채).

The name of part of homi by region
section/region	the standard language	Banwol, Gyeonggi Province	Deokjeok, Gyeonggi Province	Yeongsan, South Gyeongsan Province	Geomun-do, South Jeolla Province
a blade	Nal (날)	Nal (날)	Nal (날)	Ipari (이파리)	Ip (잎)
a tang	Seumbe (슴베)	Seumbe (슴베)	Simbe (심베)	Sumu (수무)	Sume (수메)
a handle	Jaru (자루)	Jaru (자루)	Jarak (자락)	Homangjari (호망자리)	Jari (자리)

== Classification ==
=== By shape ===
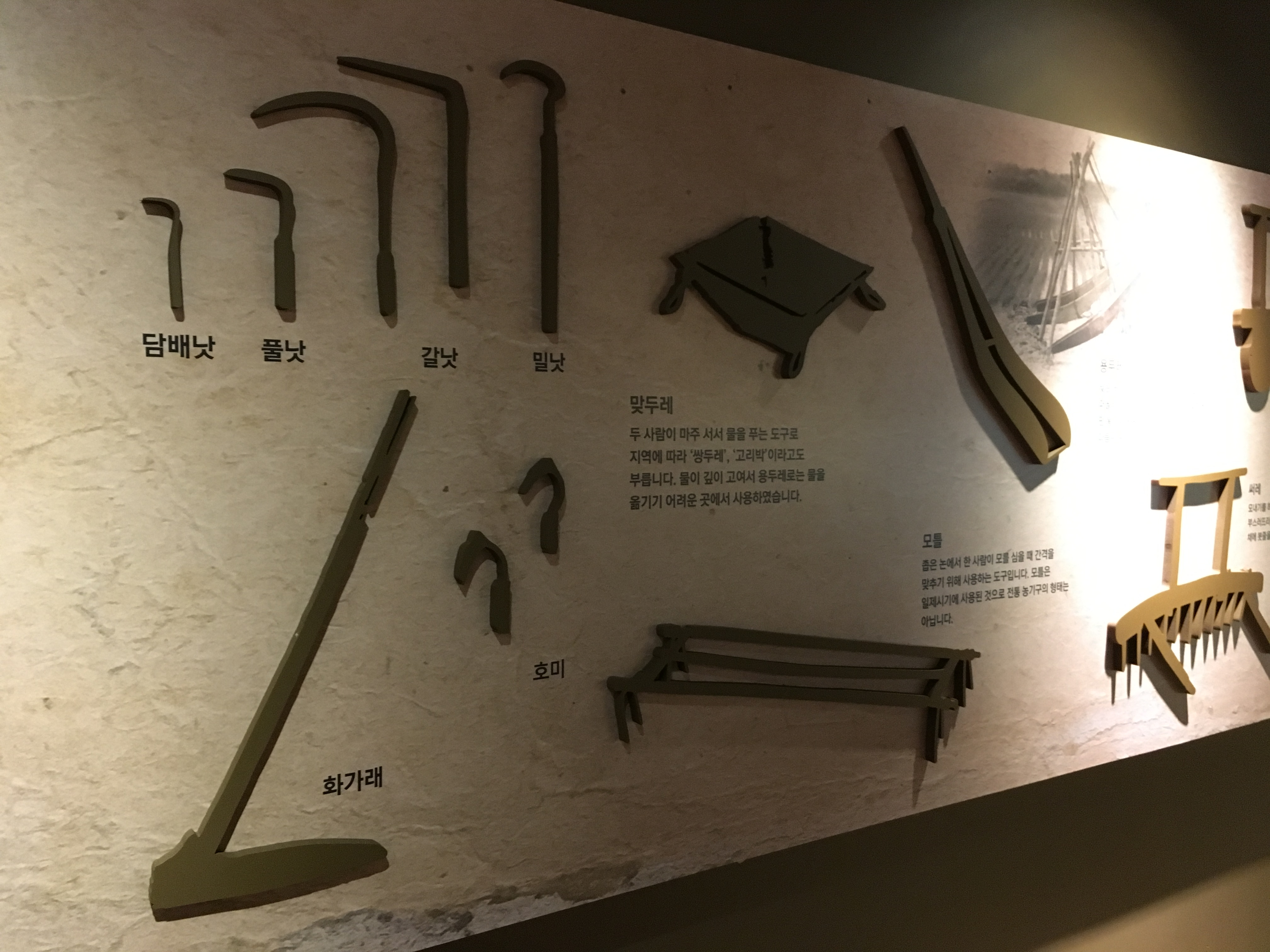
This is a simple representation of Korean farming tool. The smallest and curved ones in the center of the picture are homi.

==== Plowshare-shaped ====
Boseup-hyeong (보습형, plowshare type): In the case of boseup-hyeong homi, it is also called non-homi (논호미, paddy field homi). The pointed end of the blade and the broad blade are effective for digging soil and turning the soil upside down. The blades strength gives it the ability to weed a rice paddy. Boseup-hyeong homi is often used in paddy farming, and is wrapped with straw or hemp cloth to prevent slipperiness caused by damp soil. It can be seen mainly in Gyeonggi Province, Chungcheong Province, and some parts of North Jeolla Province. Boseup-hyeong homi, which weighs about 400 g (14 oz), enables a man to weed a rice paddy of 300 pyeong, which is roughly ~1,000 m^{2} (11,000 sq ft), per day.

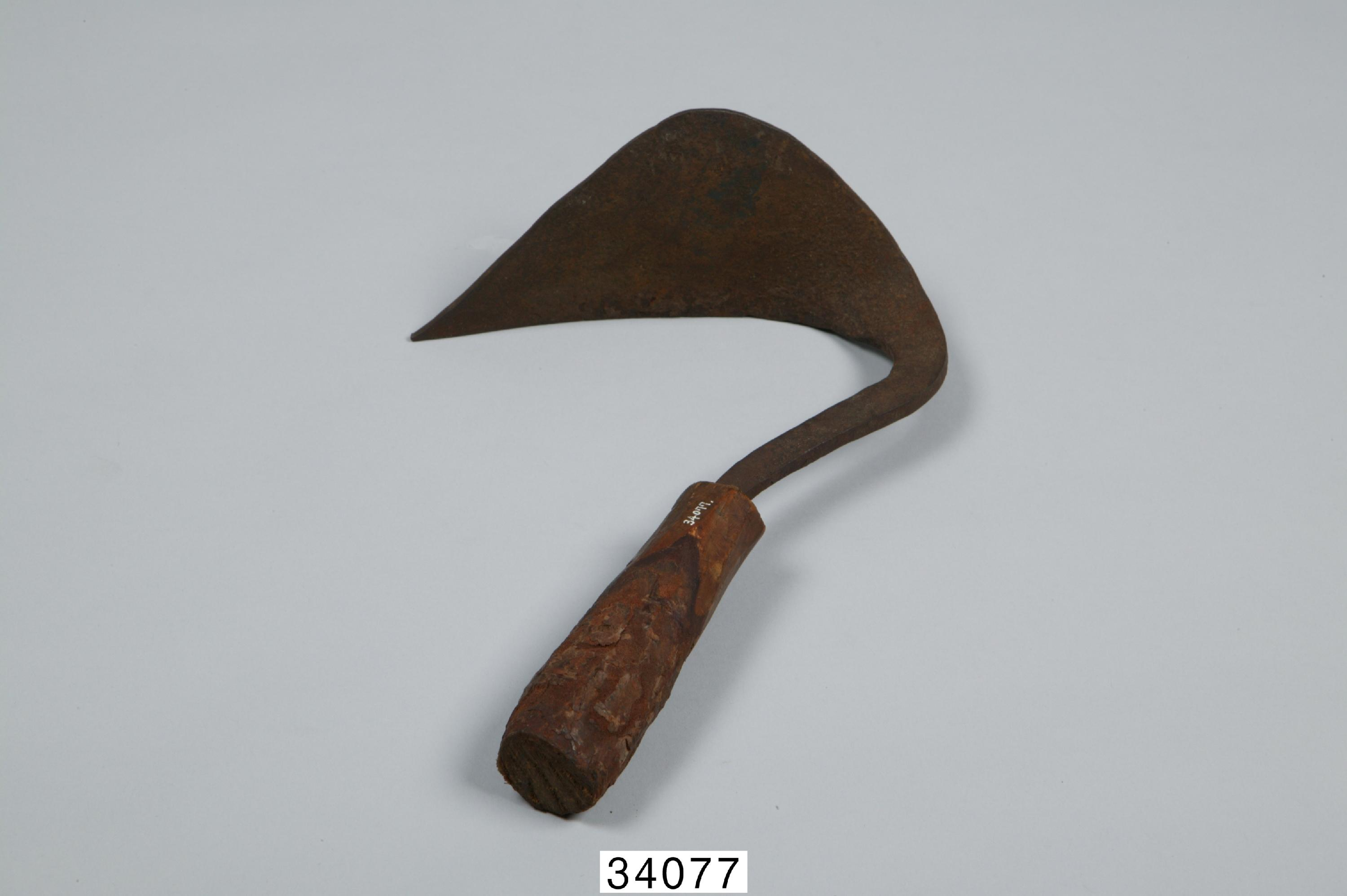
Boseup-hyeong (plowshare-type) homi

==== Sickle-shaped ====
Nat-hyeong (낫형, sickle type): The blade is longer than the width like a sickle and its tip is sharp. It is convenient to use where many obstacles are present such as gravel. It is called bat-homi (밭호미, non-paddy field homi). It has fewer blades than boseup-hyeong homi, the angle between blade, and the homi is gentle. It is mainly used in South Gyeongsang Province, Jeju Province, South Jeolla Province, island regions, and mountainous regions.

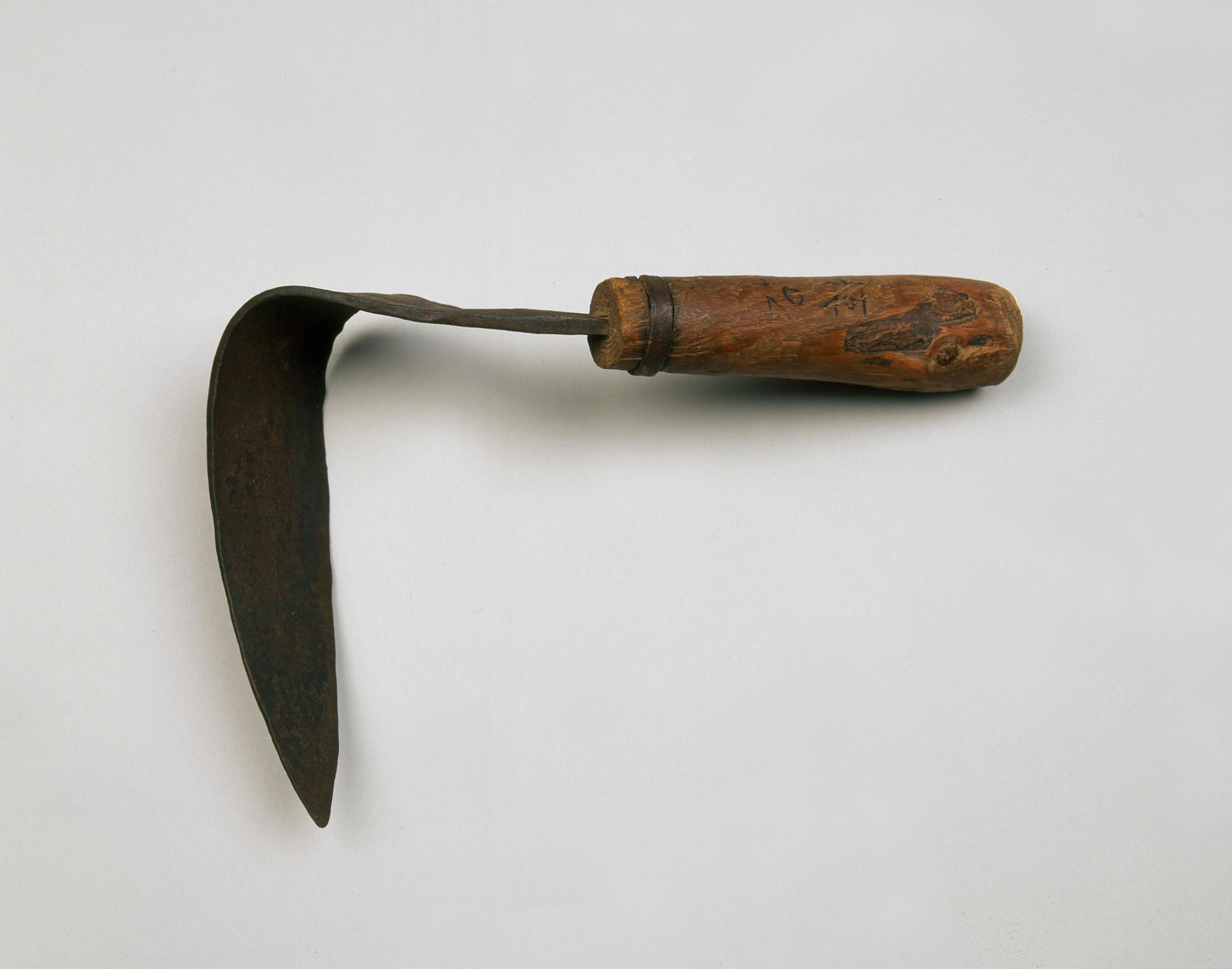
Nat-hyeong (sickle-type) homi

==== Triangle-shaped ====
Semo-hyeong (세모형, triangle type): This type takes the shape of a long triangle with the length of the bottom is longer than both sides. The blade and handle of this type is the longest allowing people to stand up. This makes it convenient to uproot the grass of a wide field like barley, corn, and wheat. It is not suitable to use on paddy fields as the power to plow up the soil is weak. It is mainly used in northern parts.

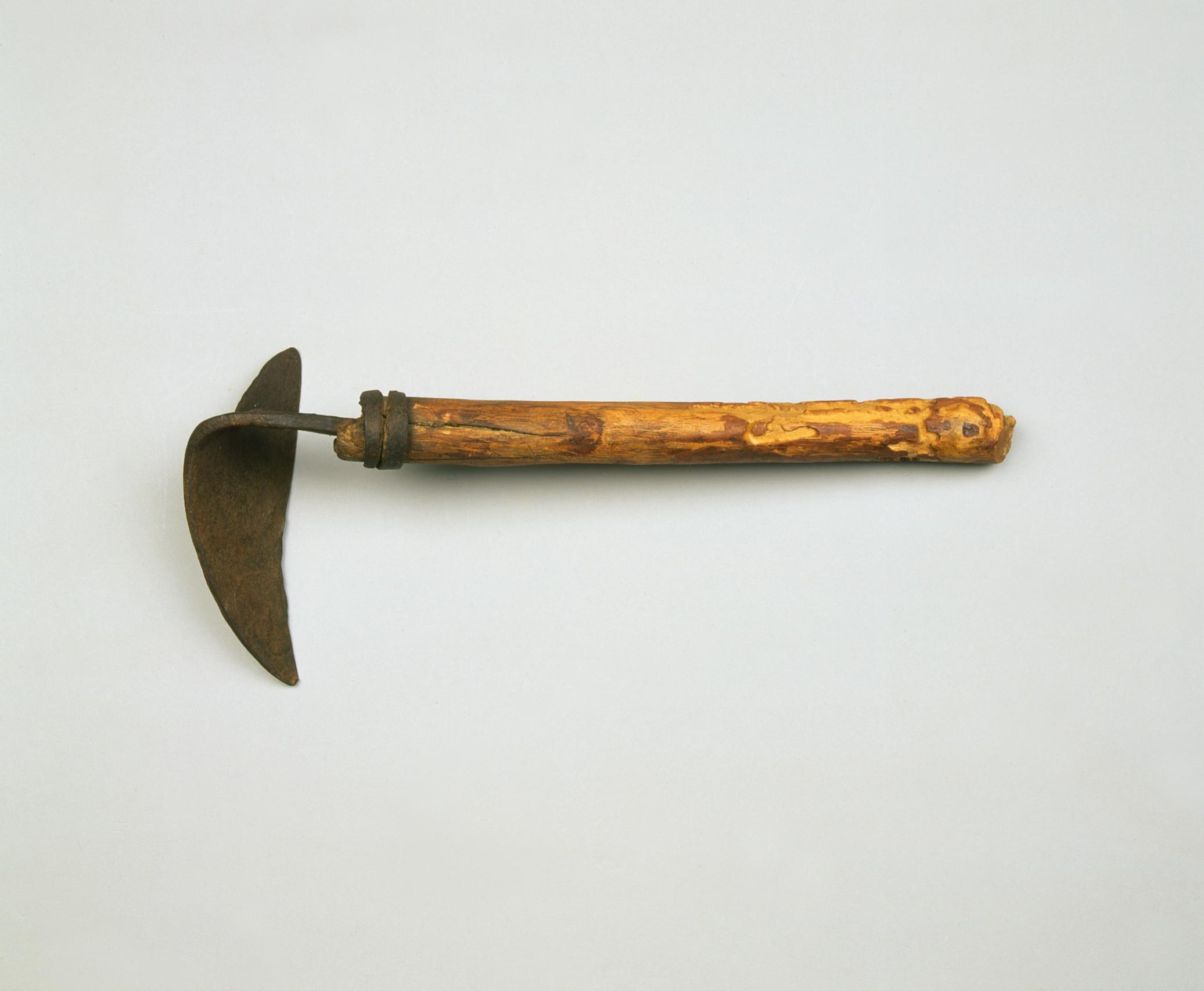
Semo-hyeong (triangle-type) homi

=== By use ===
==== For paddy fields ====
Non-homi (논호미, paddy field homi) has a sharp blade. The top width of the blade is about 10 cm (3.9 in) and the length is ~20–25 cm (7.9–9.8 in). The blade is convex. Therefore, using this homi can turn over the soil well. It is of great use when making a furrow or pulling out the weeds in a rice paddy. Its handle is wrapped in Saekki(hangul: 새끼=straw rope) to prevent wet hands from slipping. The homi in the central region has a wide blade. The southern homi has a narrow blade and a pointed tip. Tools with four ends at the end of blade are called non-homi. It is mainly used in Jeolla-do to plow up the soil between the furrow and pull out the weeds.

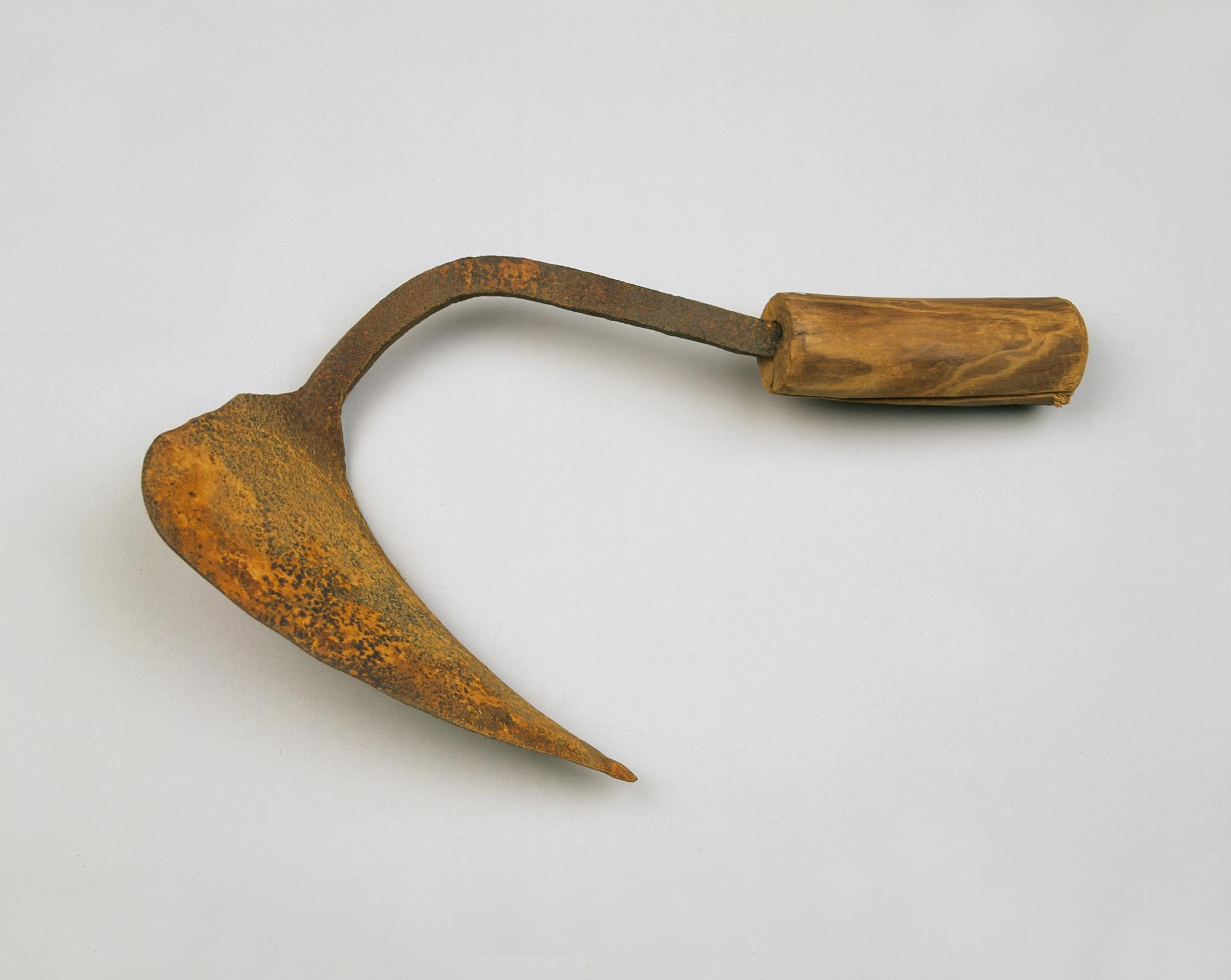
Non-homi (paddy field homi)

==== For non-paddy fields ====
Bat-homi (밭호미, dry field homi) has various shapes. It is used for all crops except aquatic rice. It is lighter and smaller than the non-homi. There are two kinds of homi: Oegwi-homi (외귀호미, single-ear homi) and yanggwi-homi (양귀호미, double-ear homi). The end of oegwihomi's blade is pointed like non-homi. Oegwihomi in the seaside district has more smaller and pointed blade. This phenomenon is noticeable in rainy regions. The homi of Jeju Island called golgaengi (골갱이) has a sharp and small blade like hooks. This is because the roots of crops fall deep into the ground in rainy region.

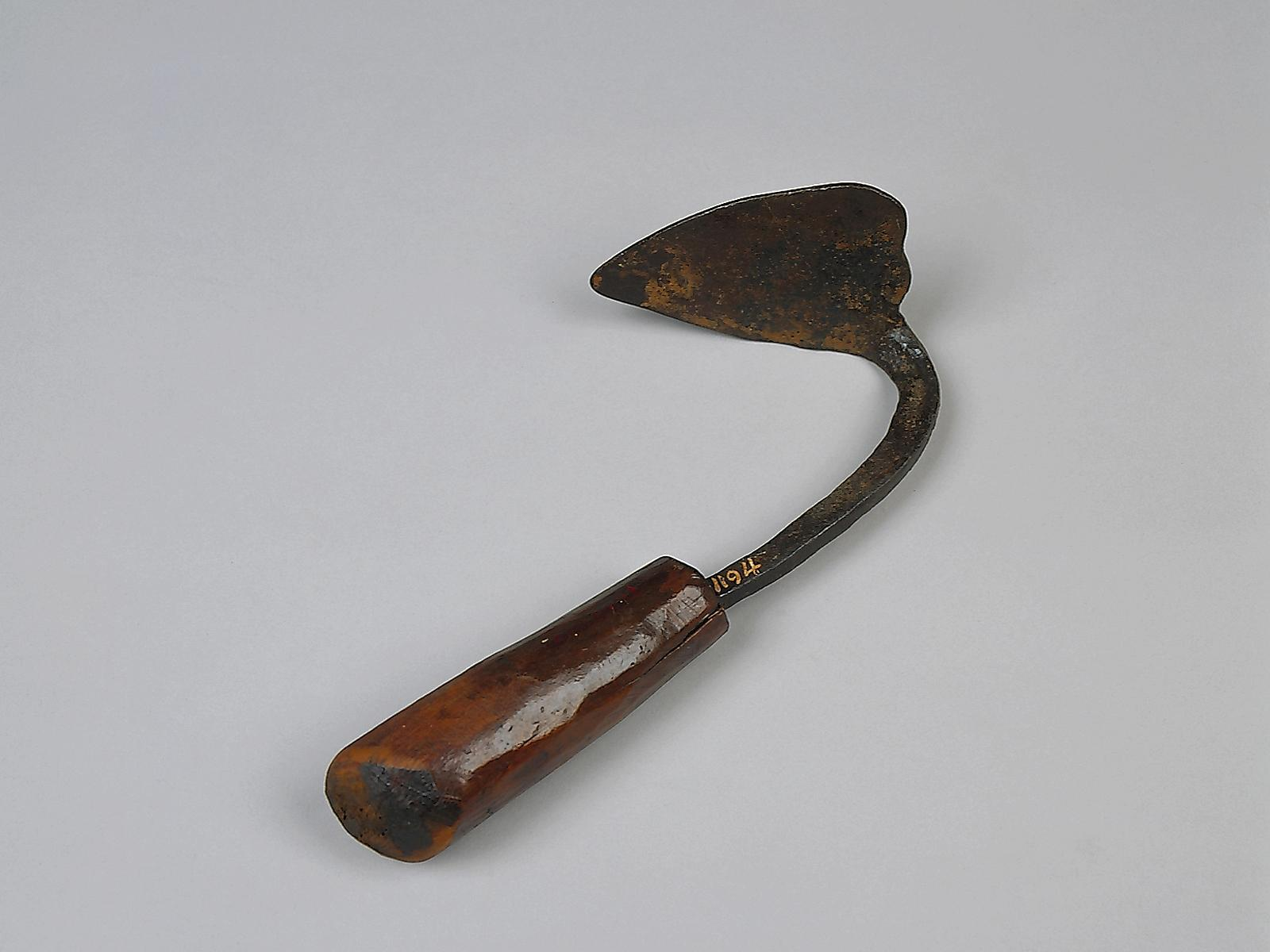
Single-ear bat-homi (dry field homi)

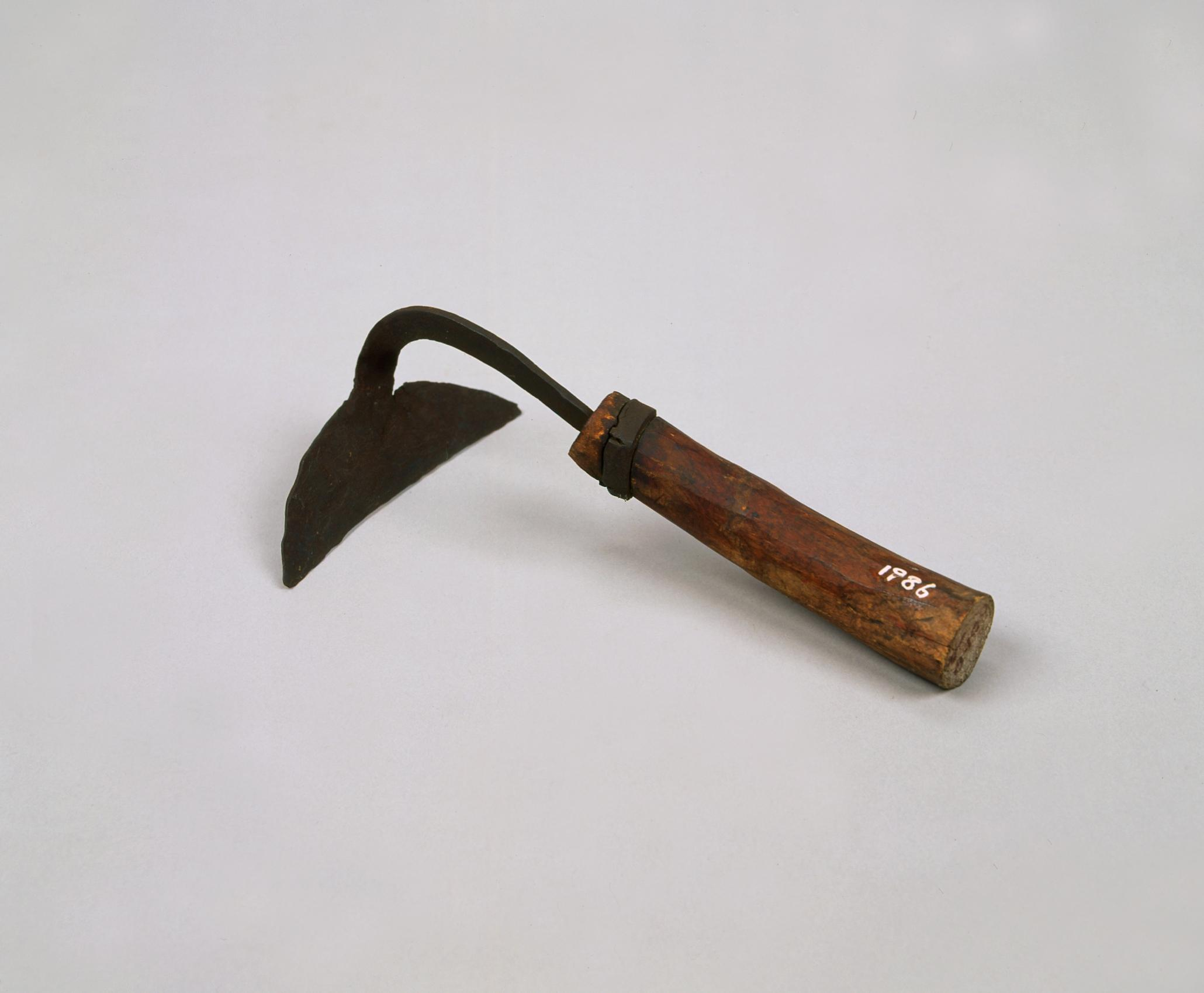
Double-ear bat-homi (dry field homi)

== History and tradition ==
=== History ===
Homi was a unique tool of Korea, as homi was called "Eastern hoe (東鋤; the "East" referring to Korea)" in the Essays on Rural Life and Economy written by Seo Yugu during the years 1806–1842. It stated homi as a useful tool in the Eastern nation (Korea). It can be seen in the relics from Anapji in the Unified Silla period, and the shape of homi in the Goryeo period is the same today. The homae reported in Farming in Korea and homi from the painting of Gisan show that the short homi of old times is much longer than the current homi. The name of long handle homi which pulls out the weed was changed to gajiip-gwaengi (가지잎괭이) or susuip-gwaengi (수수잎괭이).

In Guui-dong ruins, 7 iron homi was excavated. The neck of the homi was made with iron plate to insert the handle. The blade was made in trapezoidal or rounded rectangle shape.

In the Goguryeo era, the neck of a homi blade was short and the blade was slightly outward curved. The edges of the blade are rounded. It was excavated mainly with U-shaped ironware. Homi was found not only in the tomb but also in many historical sites such as buildings and castles.

As the region entered the unified Silla period, the blade of homi has changed from wide shape to narrow and sharp shaped as it is today. In Anapji, wide bladed homi assumed as long handle homi was excavated with nat-hyeong (sickle type) homi having narrow blade. This nat-hyeong (sickle type) homi is most similar to today's homi.

=== Tradition ===
==== Goyang Songpo homigeori ====
Homigeori (호미걸이), also called homissisi (호미씻이), means that after finishing the farming of the year, farmers wash the homi and hang it for the farming of the next year. It is based on the dure (farmers' cooperative group) community, which was active in farming areas. It is done in July when weeding is finished. Hanging homi on an agricultural machine actually means ending the farming. In 1984, it won the General Excellence Award at the Gyeonggi Province Folk Art Competition. In 1998, it was designated as the Gyeonggi Province Intangible Cultural Asset No. 22.

It is said that it is not done every year, but only when it is judged that the farming was done well by some degree of the farming about the year. When homigeori is determined, the villagers prepare the feast by checking the musical instruments and flags to be used in the play and preparation of the food. Before the dawn, the men gathered in front of the flag and performed Sangsanje, playing the Marching Song. Next, the women set the table sirusang and performed Daedongje in the yard. Sangsanje means wishes for good farming of the next year. Daedongje means wishes for no disease and no injuries to the villagers.

After the end of pungmul, Daedongje, people head to the village entrance to greet neighboring durepae (farmers' cooperative group people) with their flags. And neighboring durepae gather in a yard with a cart with liquor barrels. As people do gijeolbatgi (기(旗)절받기) and gisseulgi (기(旗)쓸기), people play with the pungmul. When it is sunset, Neighboring durepae returns. After neighboring durepae return home, they do jipdori (visiting several houses) and finish the homigeori.

The Songpo homigeori, which contains the power and soul for the arts, was discontinued at the end of 1931, but recently it has been partly reproduced by the efforts of the Preservation Society of Songpo homigeori.

== Outside Korea ==
The common homi in Korea is emerging as an "it" item abroad. It is being reinterpreted as a revolutionary farming tool. It is also emerging as a farming tool that gardeners use outside Korea. Homi is sometimes written with a hyphen as ho-mi outside Korea. Over 130 companies sell homi on Amazon.

On YouTube, guide videos are available to explain how to use a homi. A farmer outside Korea began to introduce digging the soil with homi and removing weeds while gardening.

Gardeners' attention to homi outside Korea is due to the high demand for equipment that can do delicate work in the United States where the landscape culture has developed. Most people used shovels to plow fields before they knew homi. Due to the fact that the scope of digging the land is large, the crops had unwanted scratches and people also used much power. However, homi can only dig in the ground of the desired part, and has the advantage of being able to cut grass like a knife at a time.

In 2018, it gained traction abroad, mainly the United States, and orders began to pour in. It was later proclaimed the hottest gardening tool of spring 2019 by Quartz.

In popular culture, homis were referenced during the 62nd Annual Grammy Awards, when RM from BTS performed a new verse for Old Town Road with Lil Nas X, called "Seoul Town Road". Homi is also a homophone of homie, a term for a friend used often in hip-hop. BTS confirmed the wordplay on Twitter: "Seoul Town Road with my Ho-Mi @LilNasX", along with a picture of a homi.

== See also ==
- Hoe
- Weeder
- Guna
