= Itak =

Itak may refer to:

- Bolo knife, a large cutting tool called an itak in Tagalog
- Illankai Tamil Arasu Kachchi (ITAK), a Sri Lankan political party which represents the Sri Lankan Tamil ethnic minority
