= Bolo knife =

Philippine knife or sword

Bolo
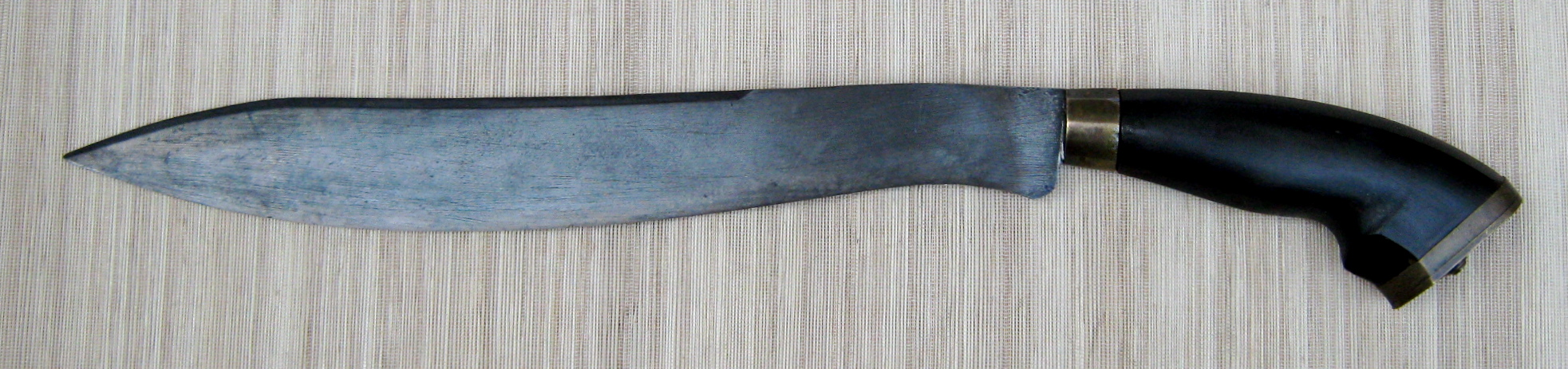
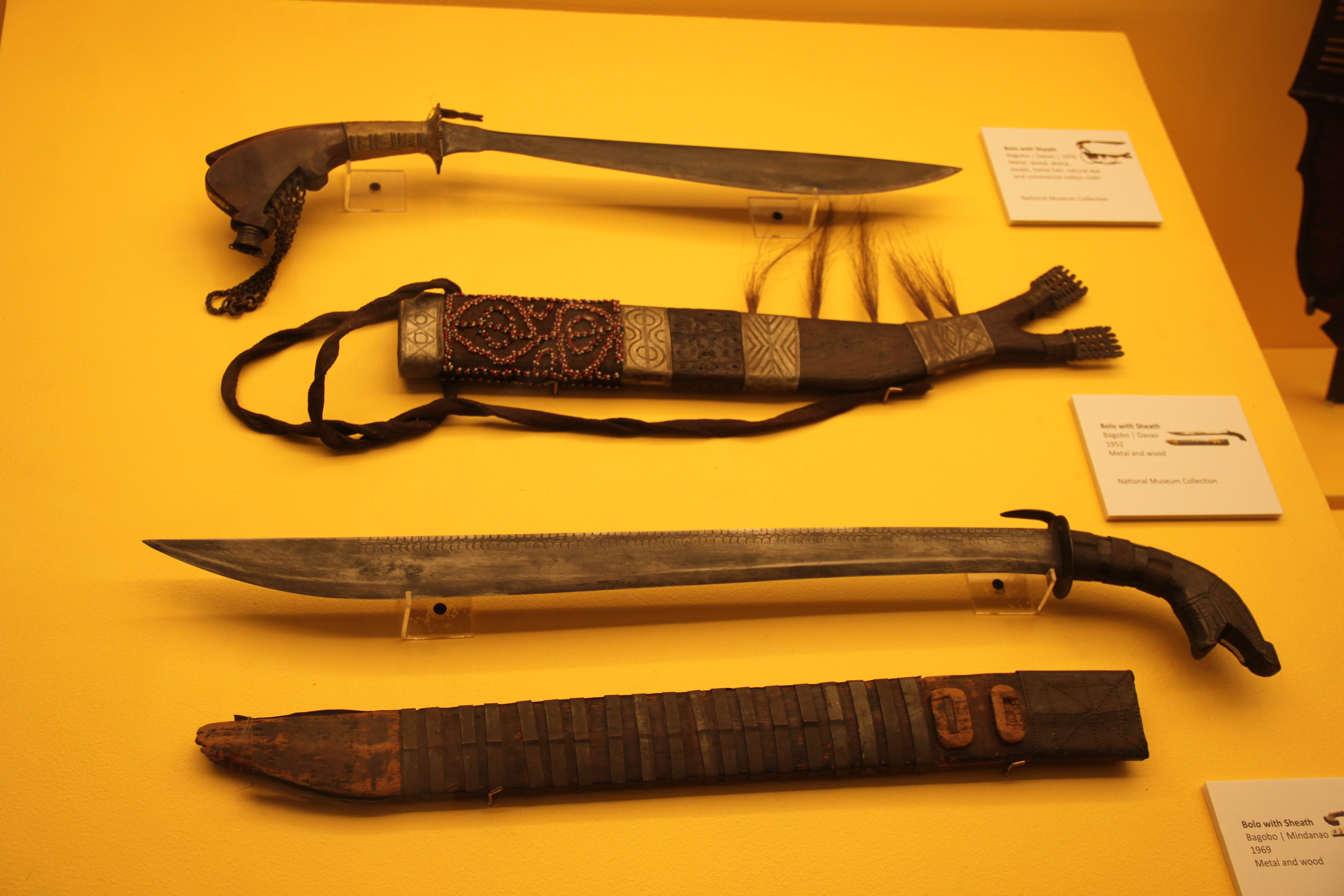
- Top: A typical bolo from Luzon; Bottom: Lumad bolos with sheaths from Mindanao in the National Museum of Anthropology
- Type: Knife or sword
- Place of origin: Philippines

Service history
- Wars: Battle of Mactan; Spanish Conquest; Philippine Revolution; Spanish–American War; Philippine–American War; World War I; World War II

Specifications
- Blade type: Single-edged, convex blade
- Hilt type: hardwood, carabao horn
- Scabbard/sheath: hardwood, carabao horn

A bolo (Tagalog: iták/gulok, Ilocano: bunéng, Ibanag: badáng/aliwa, Pangasinan: baráng, Kapampangan: paláng, Bikol: tabák/minasbad, Cebuano: súndang/kampilan, Waray: sansibar, Hiligaynon: sandúko/binangon, Aklan: talibong) is a general term for traditional pre-colonial small- to medium-sized single-edged swords or large knives of the Philippines that function both as tools and weapons. Bolos are characterized by a wide curved blade that narrows down to the hilt, and that comes with a pointed or a blunt tip.

Bolos are sometimes incorrectly described as a type of machete (as bolo machete), due to their similarities in use and shape. But bolos are not related to the machete. Bolos are pre-colonial in origin and have very different characteristics. The most obvious physical difference between the two is the shape of the cutting edge, which is typically curved in bolos and more or less straight in machetes.

== Description ==
Bolos are differentiated from other Filipino swords and bladed implements by their dual use as both tools and weapons. They are characterized by a curved (usually convex) wide blade that narrows towards the hilt, with pointed or blunt tips. There are various types of bolos differing by ethnic group and purpose, ranging from large knives to short swords to specialized agricultural equipment. They had a wide range of use, from hunting to scything grass, opening coconuts, harvesting crops, or clearing dense brush.

Most bolos are cheap and unornamented, with the handle usually made from plain carabao horn or wood. Bolos with finely carved handles with precious materials were used as status symbols of high social rank.

== Common uses ==
The bolo is common in the countryside due to its use as a farming implement. As such, it was used extensively during Spanish colonial rule as a manual alternative to ploughing with a carabao. Normally used for cutting coconuts, it was also a common tool for harvesting narrow row crops found on terraces such as rice, mungbean, soybean, and peanut.

=== Use in warfare ===
During the American period in the Philippines, Filipino fighters armed with bolos were known as "bolomen". They were used as auxiliary troops by the Americans during the various battles with Moros, and others. They were often placed in front of riflemen, as beliefs in anting-anting. The bolo men were effective in close combat with riflemen using bayonets but were easily defeated if riflemen opened fire on them.

The bolo was adopted by the US Military as the bolo knife. Produced from 1897 to 1918, they remained in service both as a tool for clearing brush and for combat until World War II.

The bolo is also used in Filipino martial arts or Arnis as part of training.

== Design ==
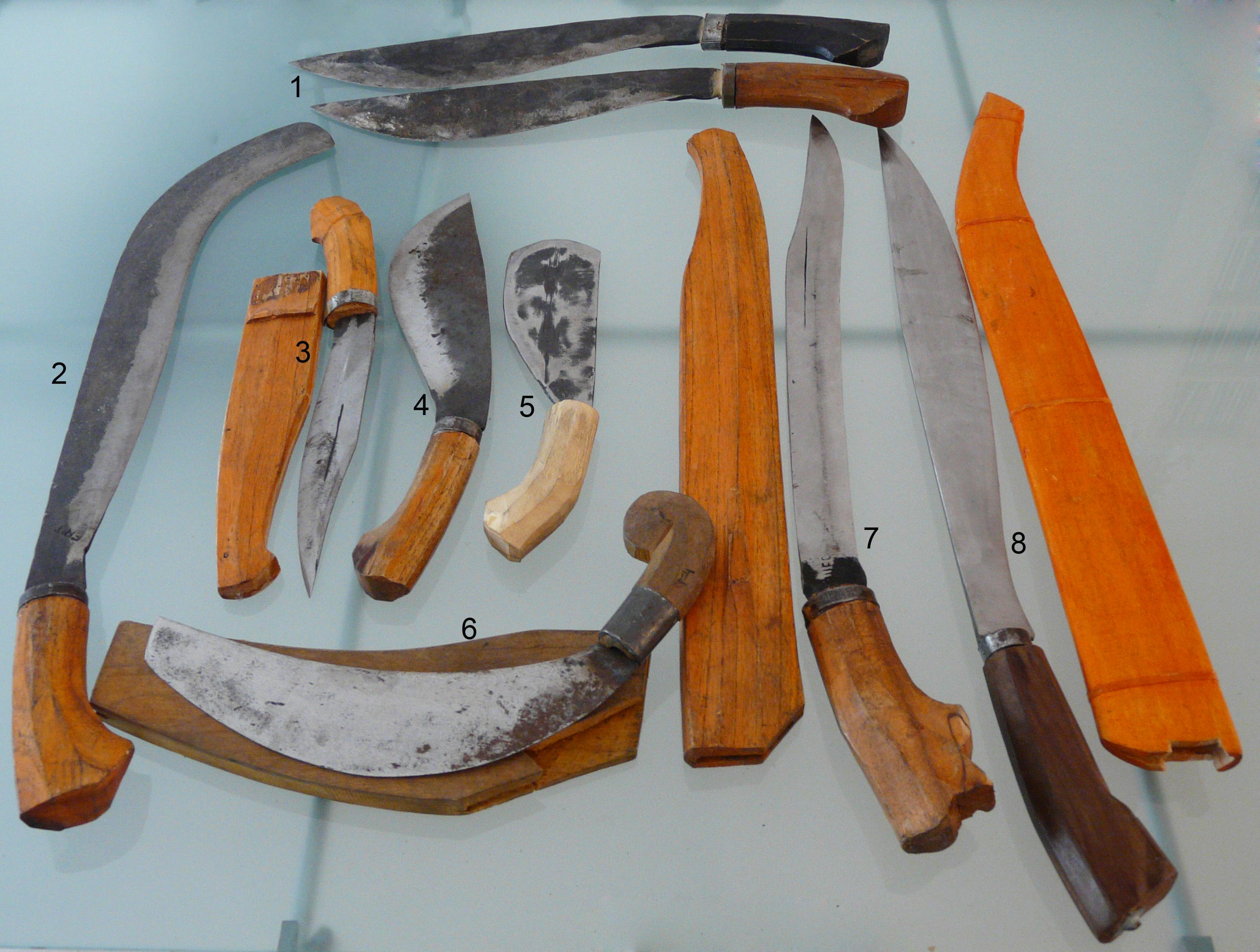
Bolos and related tools: (1) An all-purpose bolo; (2) A haras or lampas scythe; (3) A punyál knife; (4) A small bolo; (5) A guna; (6) A garab sickle; (7) A pinutî sword; (8) A súndang or iták sword (also "tip bolo")

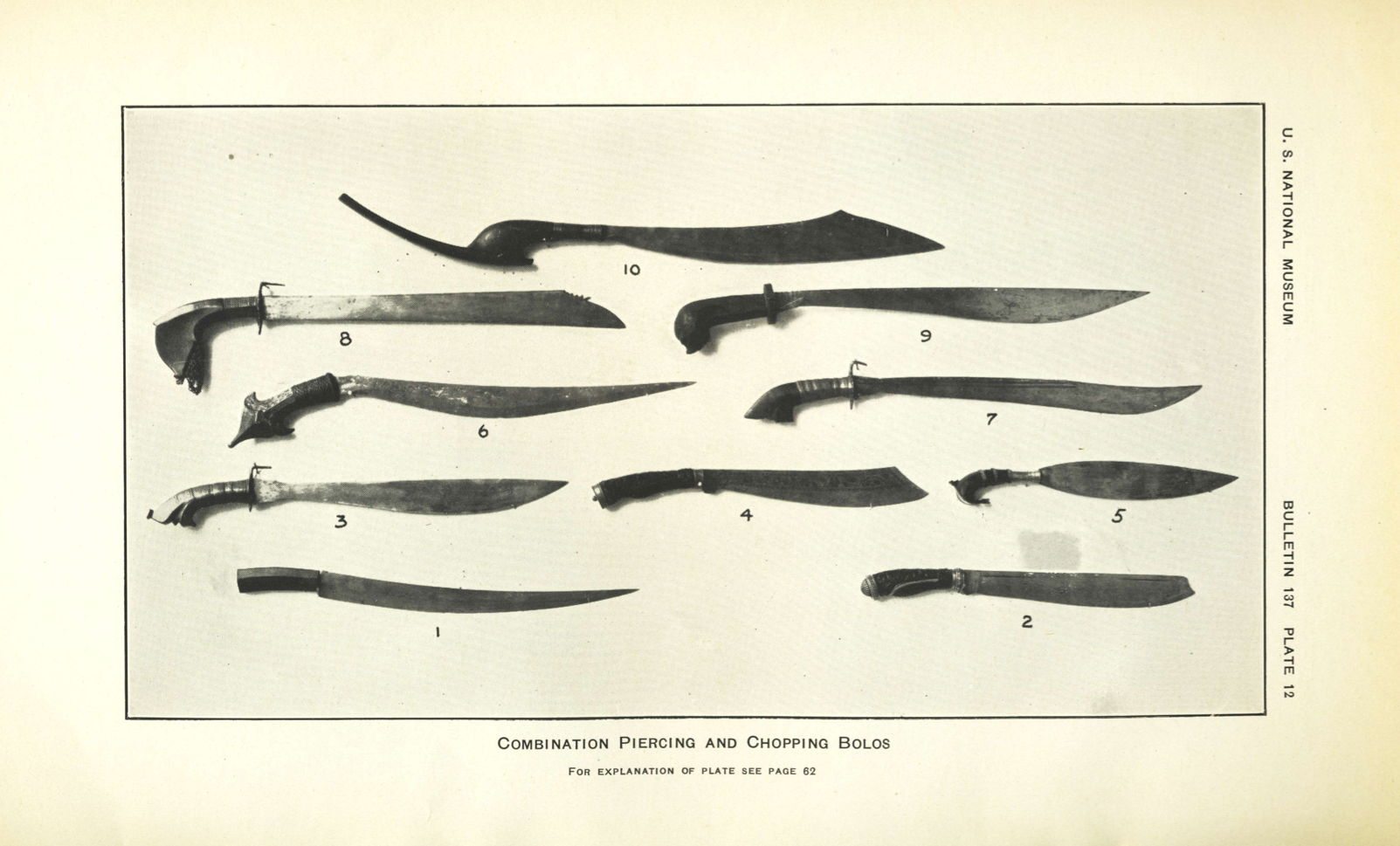
Various types of weapons usually considered "bolos" (c. 1926): (1) A Tagalog iták; (2) A Tagalog bolo; (3) A Bagobo sword; (4) A Visayan (Cebu) bolo; (5) A Tausug barong; (6) A Visayan (Cebu) pirah sword; (7) A Bagobo sword; (8) A Bagobo kampilan sword; (9) A Visayan (Panay) súndang sword; (10) A Yakan pirah sword

A bolo is characterized by having a native hardwood or animal horn handle (such as from the carabao), a full tang, and a steel blade that both curves and widens, often considerably so, towards its tip. This moves the centre of gravity as far forward as possible, giving the bolo extra momentum for chopping.

So-called "jungle bolos", intended for combat rather than agricultural work, tend to be longer and less wide at the tip. Bolos for gardening usually have rounded tips.

=== Types ===
The term "bolo" has also expanded to include other traditional blades that primarily or secondarily function as agricultural implements. They include:

- Barong - a leaf-shaped sword or knife favored by the Tausug people.
- Batangas - a single-edged bolo of the Tagalog people that widens at the tip.
- Garab - a sickle used for harvesting rice.
- Guna or Bolo-guna - A weeding knife with a very short, wide, dull blade and a perpendicular blunt end. It is used mainly for digging roots and weeding gardens.
- Iták - a narrow sword used for combat and self-defense in the Tagalog regions. Like the súndang, it is also known as the "jungle bolo" or "tip bolo", and was a popular weapon during the Philippine Revolution and the Philippine Insurrection.
- Haras - a scythe used for cutting tall grass. It is called "Lampas" by people from Mindanao.
- Pinutî - a narrow sword traditionally carried as a personal weapon for combat or self-defense.
- Pirah or Pira - a wide-tipped sword or knife favored by the Yakan people, it is also common in the Sulu Archipelago, Mindanao, and the Visayas.
- Punyál or Gunong - a dagger derivative of the kalis. Used as a side-weapon in combat, or to kill and bleed pigs during slaughter. Also known under the more generic term kutsilyo (Spanish cuchillo, "knife").
- Súndang - the most common personal weapon used for combat and self-defense in the Visayas. Also known as the "jungle bolo" or "tip bolo". It was a popular weapon of choice in the Philippine Revolution against the Spanish Empire and during the subsequent Philippine Insurrection.
  - Binangon - A form of súndang used in Western Visayas and Negros Island.

== Historical significance ==
The bolo was the primary weapon used by the Katipunan during the Philippine Revolution. It was also used by some Filipino guerrillas and bolomen during the Philippine–American War.

During World War I, United States Army soldier Henry Johnson gained international fame repelling a German raid in hand-to-hand combat using a bolo.

During World War II, members of the 1st Filipino Regiment and the 81st Division used bolos for close quarters combat, earning them the distinctive title "Moro Bolo Battalion".

On 7 December 1972, would-be assassin Carlito Dimahilig used a bolo to attack former First Lady Imelda Marcos as she appeared onstage at a live televised awards ceremony. Dimahilig stabbed Marcos in the abdomen several times, and she parried the blows with her arms. He was shot dead by security forces while she was taken to a hospital.

== Symbolism ==
The bolo serves as a symbol for the Katipunan and the Philippine Revolution, particularly the Cry of Pugad Lawin. Several monuments of Andres Bonifacio, as with other notable Katipuneros, depict him holding a bolo in one hand and the Katipunan flag in the other.

== Other uses of the term ==
In the United States Military, the slang term "to bolo" – to fail a test, exam or evaluation, originated from the combined Philippine-American military forces including recognized guerrillas during the Spanish–American War and the Philippine Insurrection; those local soldiers and guerrillas who failed to demonstrate proficiency in marksmanship were issued bolos instead of firearms so as not to waste scarce ammunition. The lowest level of qualification for the Army Marksmanship Qualification Badge (Marksmanship badges (United States)), ‘marksman’, is unofficially known as a ‘bolo’ badge.

In hand-to-hand combat sports, especially boxing, the term "bolo punch" is used to describe an uppercut thrown in a manner mimicking the arcing motion of a bolo while in use.

== Gallery ==
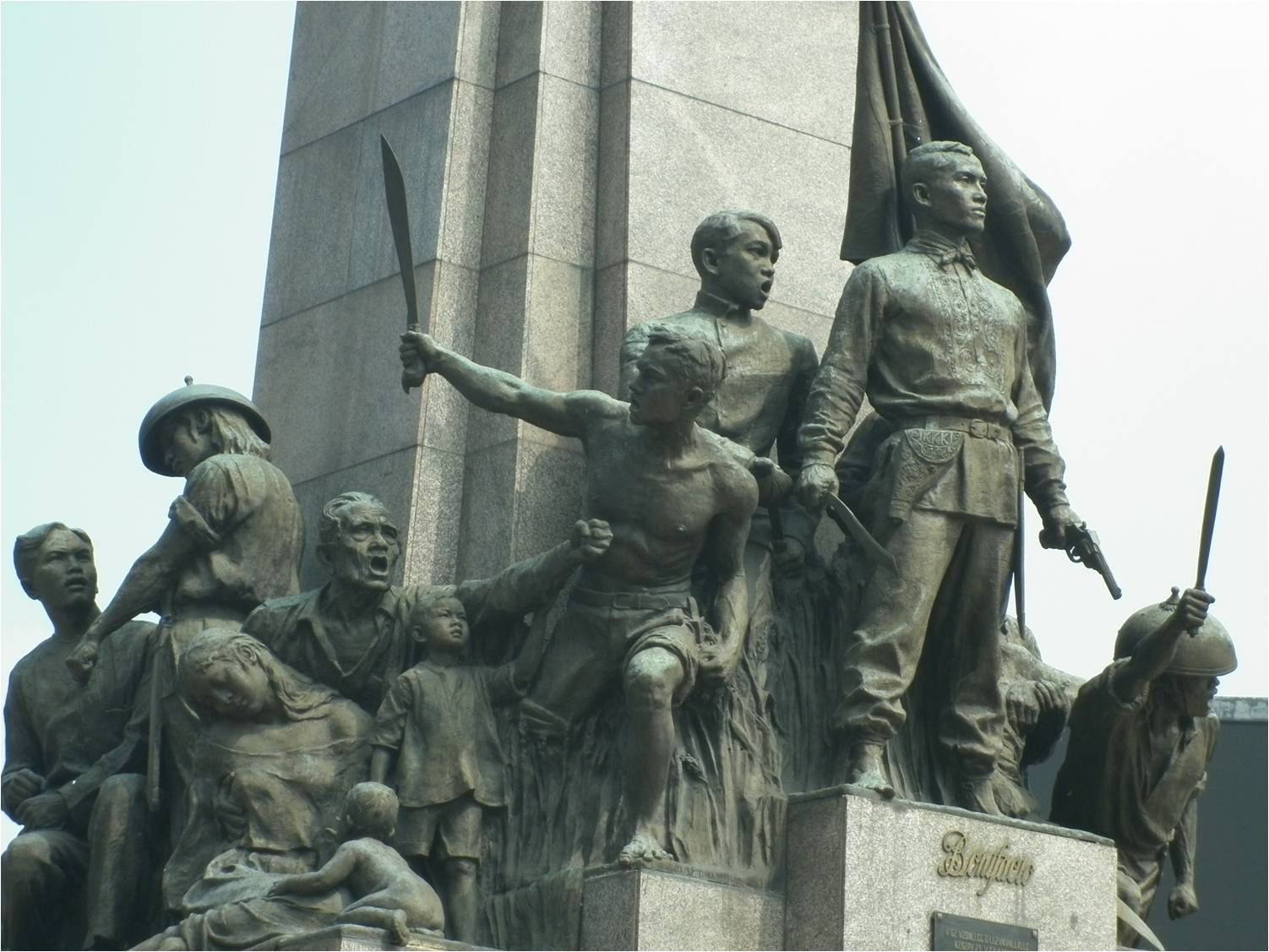
The Bonifacio Monument in Caloocan depicting the Katipunan and the Philippine Revolution

Bolo given to Captain Lewis A. Kimberly, Commander of USS Beneica by the Governor of Cebu

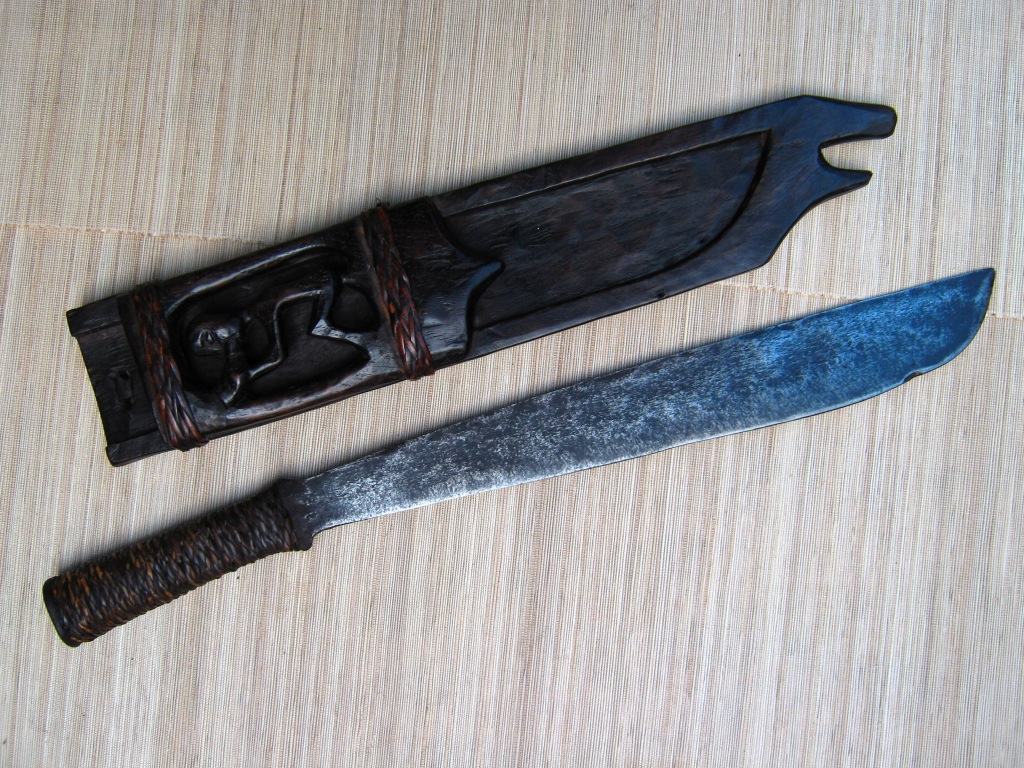
A pinahig utility bolo of the Ifugao people

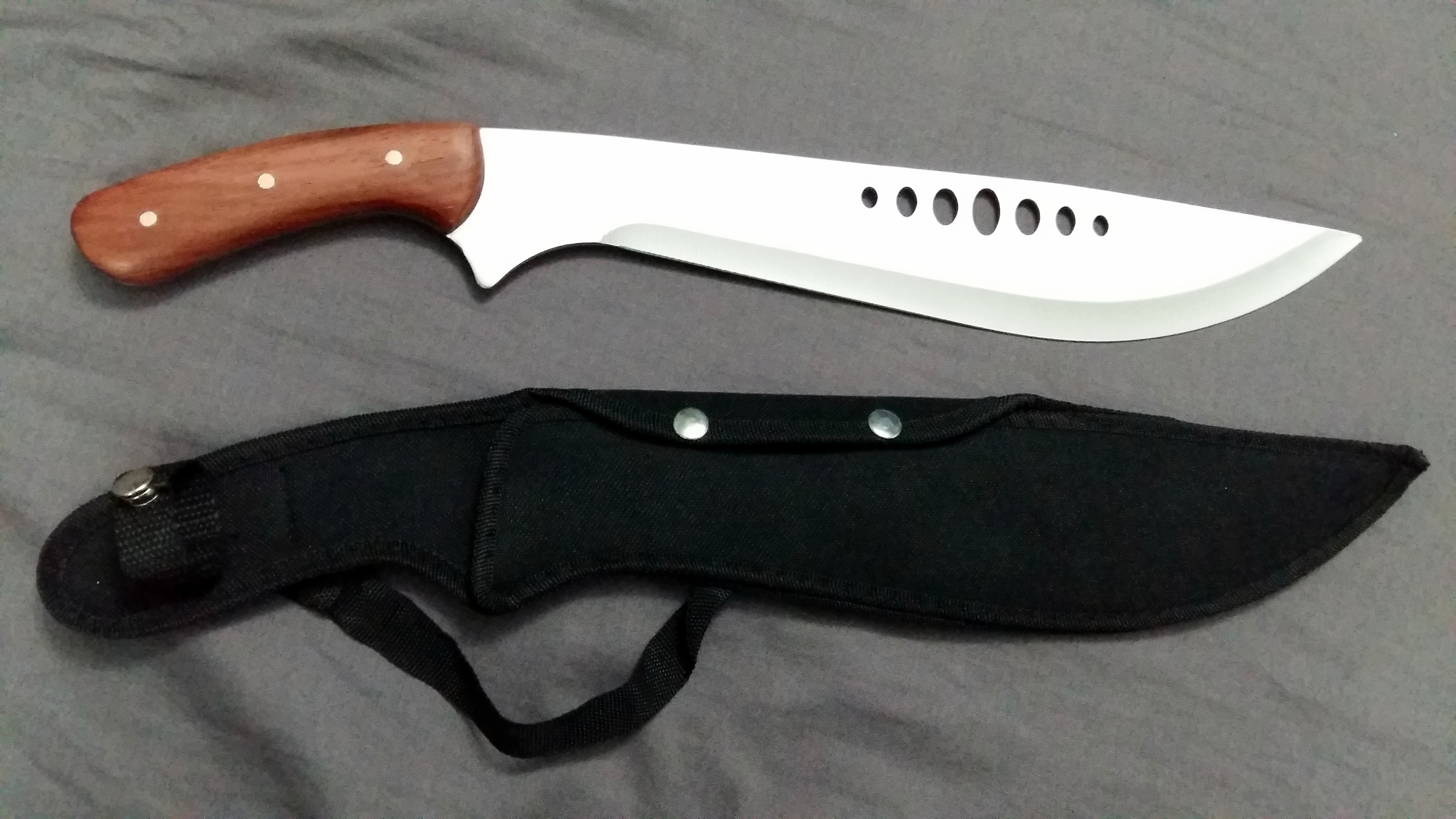
A modern bolo

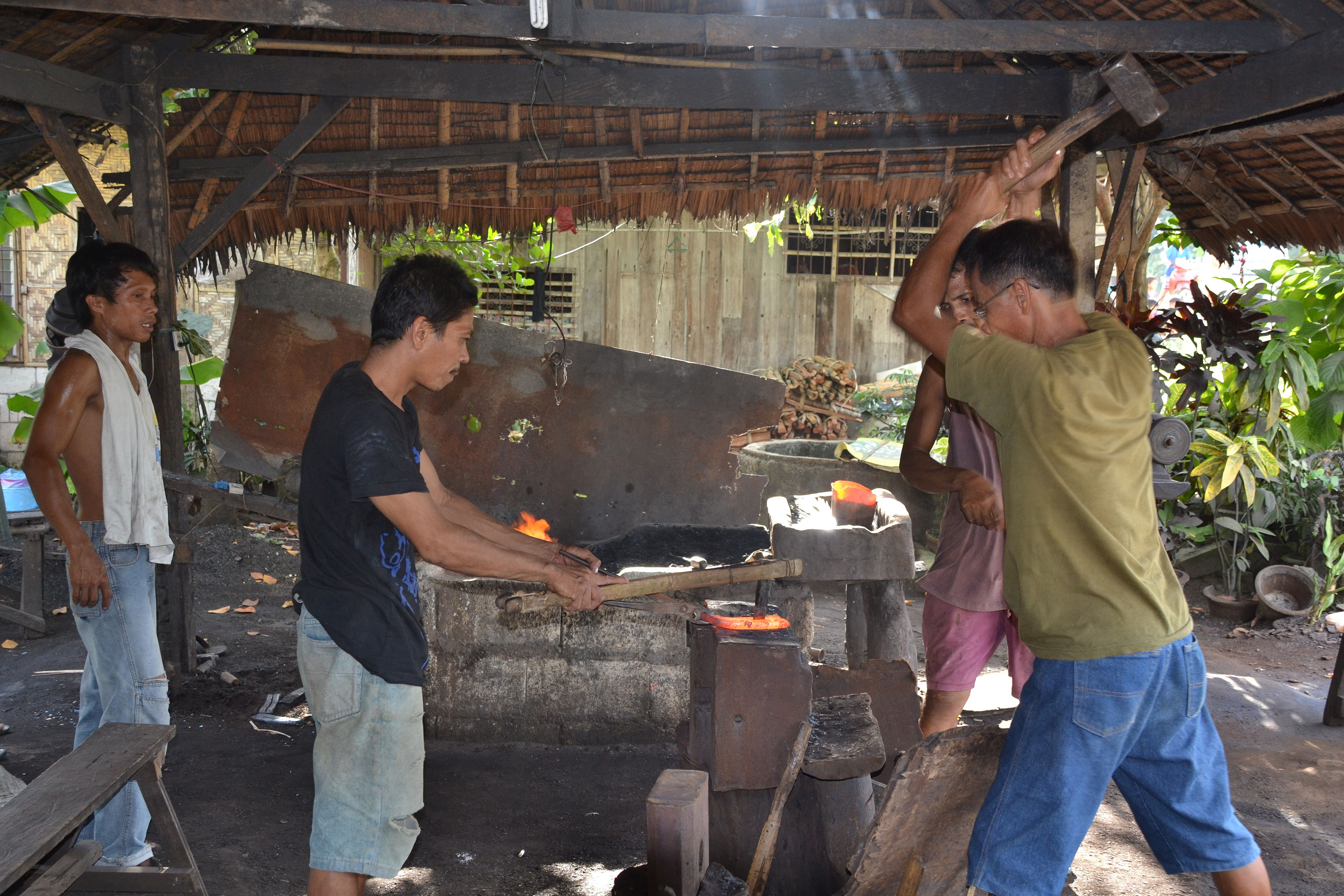
Traditional blacksmiths forging a bolo

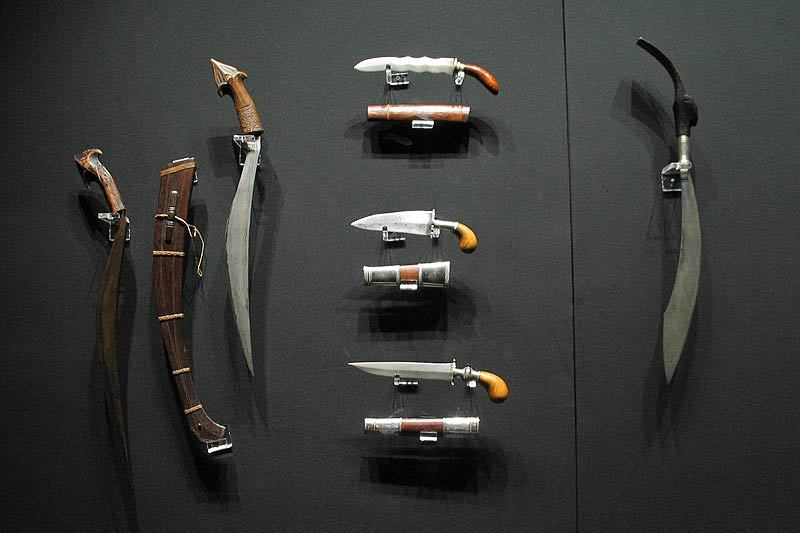
War bolos from Basilan, including gunong (center) and pirah (right)

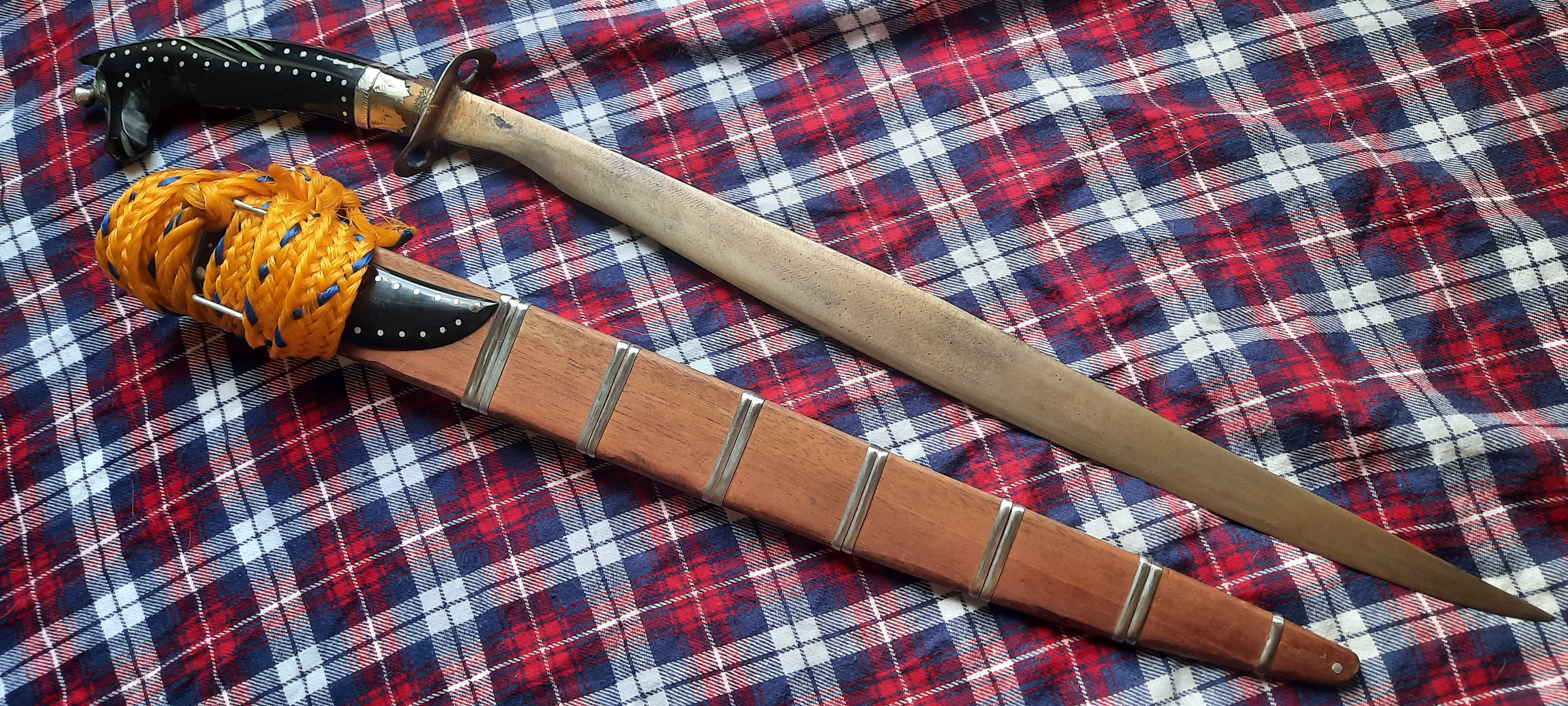
A sinungot hipon from Rizal (province), a common traditional bolo or itak of the Tagalog people

== See also ==
- Cane knife
- Dahong palay
- Golok
- Kalis (also called "sundang" in eastern Indonesia)
- Kukri
- Machete
- Operation: BOLO, An American military operation during the Vietnam War
- Parang
