= Guna (knife) =

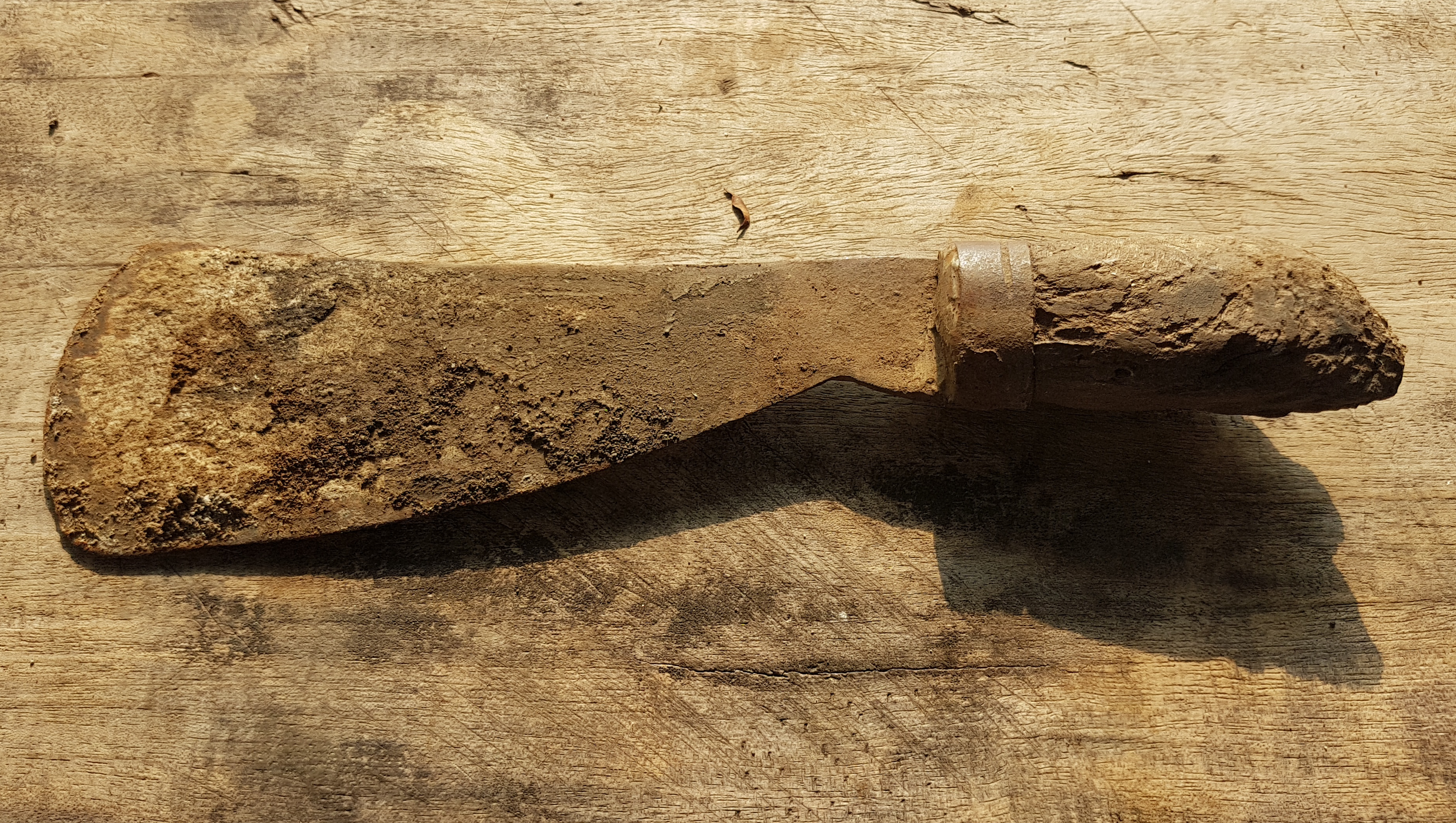
- Type: Knife
- Place of origin: Philippines

Specifications
- Blade type: Single-edged
- Hilt type: hardwood
- Scabbard/sheath: hardwood

Guna, also called bolo-guna, is a Filipino weeding knife with a very short and wide dull blade with a perpendicular blunt end. It is an agricultural tool used mainly for digging roots and weeding gardens, approximating the functions of a garden hoe. It is the smallest type of bolo.

== See also ==
- Gunong
- Homi
