= Kalis =

Type of Philippine sword

Kalis ᜃᜎᜒᜐ᜔ كاليس
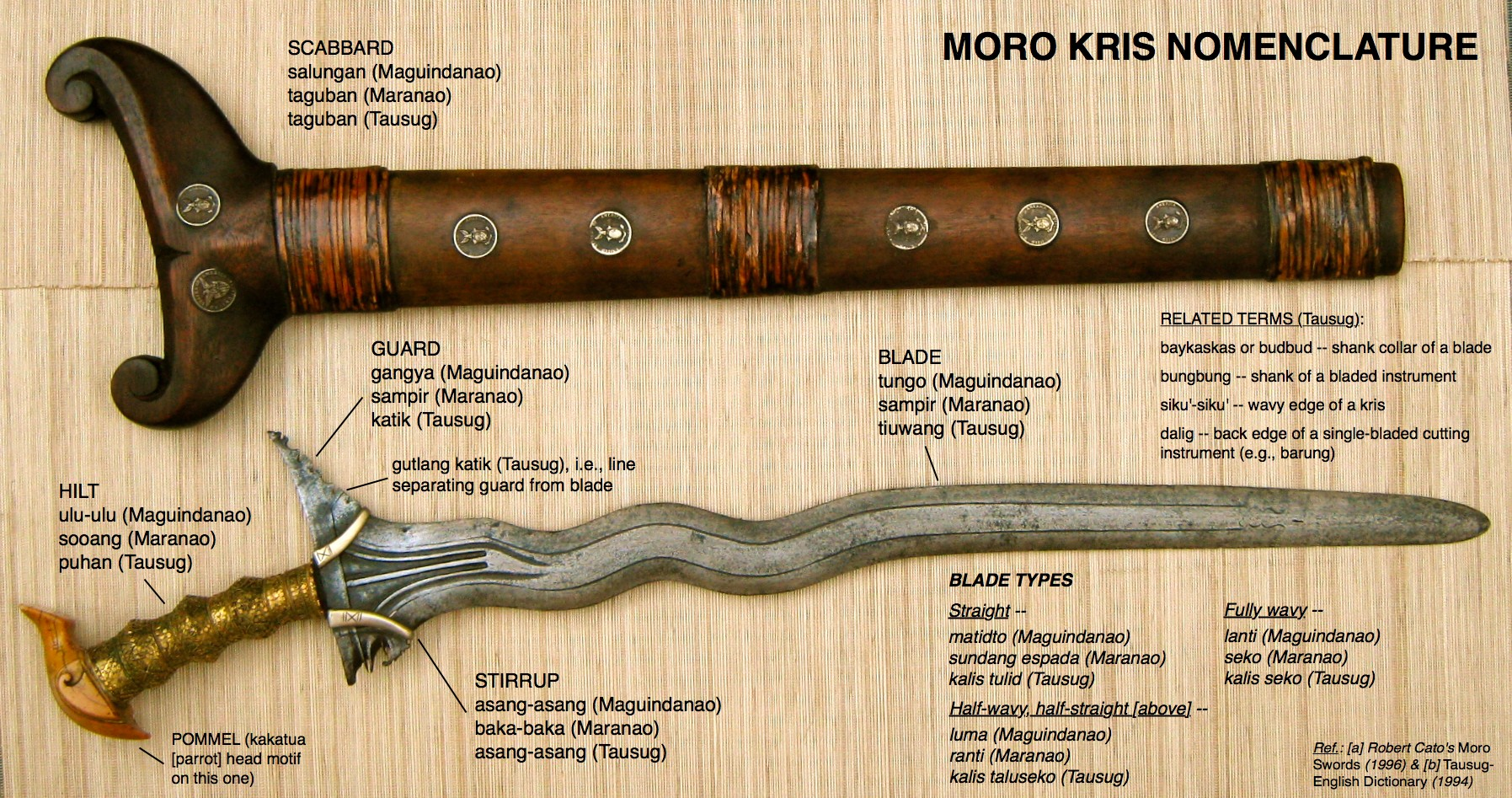
- Moro kalis nomenclature, given in Tausūg, Maranao, and Maguindanao. This particular sword has a kakatua (cockatoo) pommel.
- Type: Sword
- Place of origin: Philippines

Service history
- In service: Tondo, Rajahnate of Cebu, Butuan, Rajahnate of Maynila, Ma-i, Sultanate of Maguindanao, Sultanate of Sulu, Bruneian Empire
- Used by: Moro people (Sama people, Maguindanao people, Maranao people, Tausūg people), Tagalog people

Specifications
- Length: blade length: 46–66 cm (18–26 in)
- Blade type: Double edged
- Hilt type: Wood, ivory
- Scabbard/sheath: Wood

A kalis (Baybayin: ᜃᜎᜒᜐ᜔; Jawi script: كاليس; Abecedario: cális) is a type of Philippine sword derived from the wider Southeast Asian, originally Javanese keris, better known as kris. It differs in that the Philippine kris or kalis tends to be a sword, not a dagger, and thus often called a "kris sword".

Like the keris, the kalis has a double-edged blade, which is commonly straight from the tip but wavy near the handle. Kalis exists in several variants, either with a fully straight or fully wavy blade.

While the dagger-sized kris or kalis also exists in the Philippines, "kris" by itself in Philippine English contexts usually connotes the sword instead of the dagger. The sword is much larger than the keris and has a straight or slightly curved hilt, making it a primarily heavy slashing weapon in contrast to the stabbing pistol grip of the keris.

The wavy portion of the kalis is said to be meant to facilitate easier slashing in battle, since a straight edge tends to get stuck in the opponent's bones, the wavy portion allows the kalis bearer to more easily pull the weapon out of their opponent's body.

The kalis is also known as sundang among the Maranao and Maguindanao people (not to be confused with the Visayan sundang, which is part of the wider bolo family of Philippine blades). It is also known as sundang, sondang or keris Sulu in Kalimantan and Sulawesi in Indonesia, where it was reintroduced from contact with Mindanao.

== History ==
The predecessor of the kalis, the keris, first appeared in the 13th century, originally from the island of Java in Indonesia. From there the keris migrated to the Philippines where it evolved into the kalis. Other countries in which the keris and keris-like weapons can be found include Malaysia, Brunei, southern Thailand and some other countries in Mainland Southeast Asia.

Both the sword and dagger versions were used in the Philippines, with the dagger version being known as the gunong or gulok (also called punyal, from puñal de kris, "kris dagger"). Unlike the keris, the gunong is more commonly used as a utility knife and only used as a weapon as a last resort. It was a concealed knife, usually tucked into sashes by both men and women. Because of this, it was commonly unornamented or only sparsely ornamented. Its blade can also be single or double-edged. Similar to the kalis, its blade varies from straight, to partially wavy, to fully wavy. Some versions have very short, almost triangular blades. Older versions of the gunong have straight or a slightly curving hilt, but it eventually evolved into a pistol grip.

All the Filipino types of kalis swords are both larger and heavier than those from Indonesia. Although it is considered to be a slashing weapon, the kalis can be effectively used for thrusts and stabs. The larger kalis was introduced back to Indonesia, especially in Kalimantan and Sulawesi, where it is known as sundang, sondang or keris Sulu.

== Physical description ==
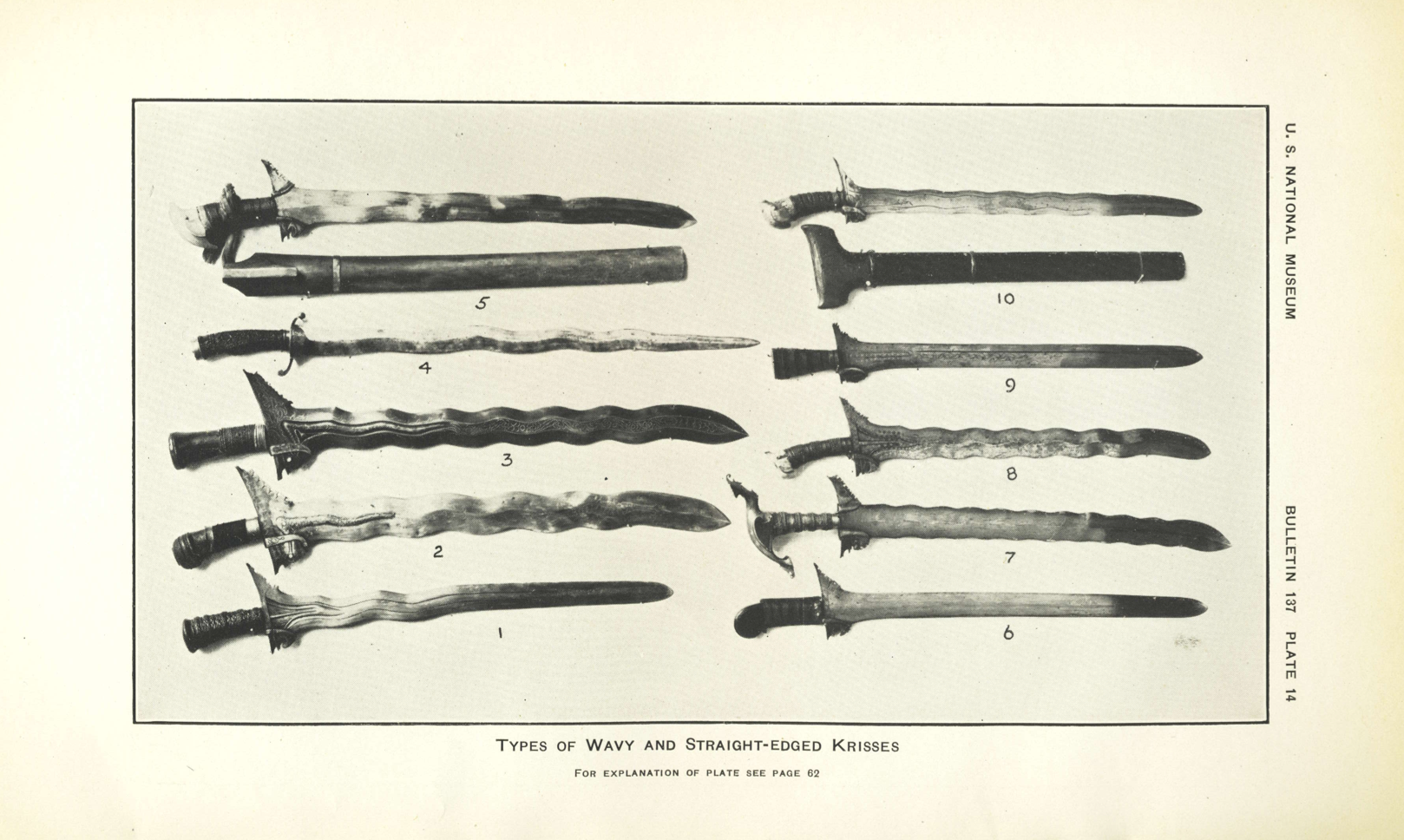
Various types of Moro kalis (c.1926) showing blade variation

=== Blade ===
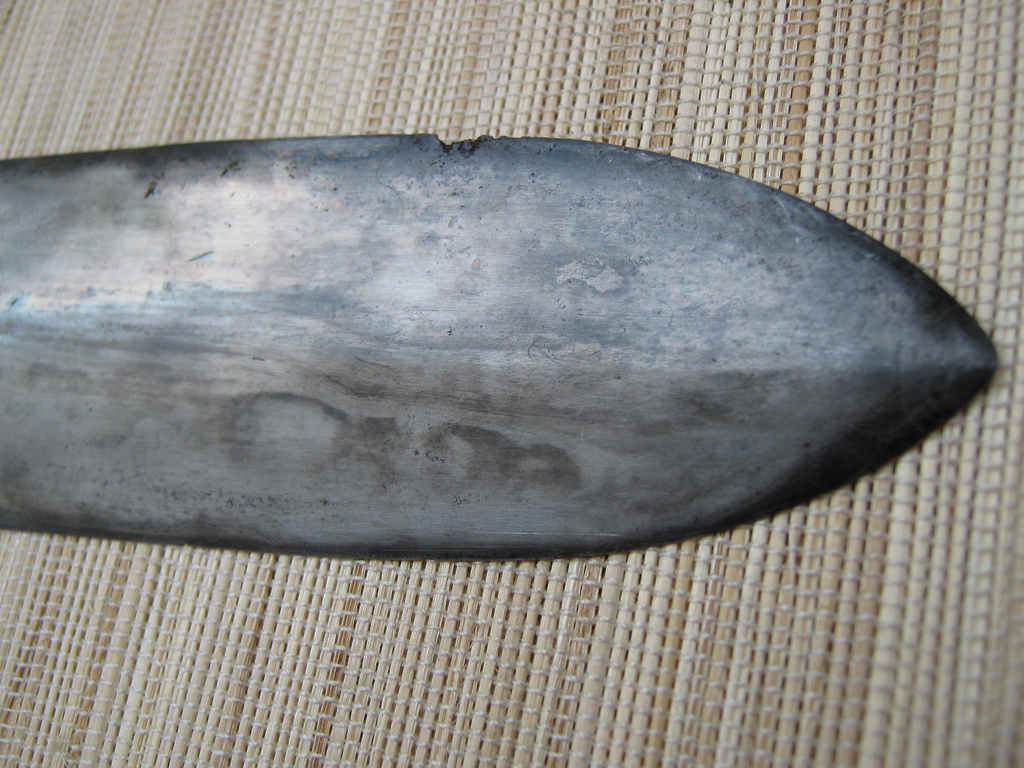
In this example, the blade's lamination pattern and the darker high-carbon cutting edge of the blade are visible. This harder high-carbon cutting edge is termed as "sinubo" (roughly, "sandwiched").

The kalis blade is defined as one that is wide on the base and double-edged. It is capable of delivering both chopping and slicing cuts. While many assume the traditional form of the kalis is the fully wavy blade, the half-waved half-straight, as well as the fully straight blades, are equally if not more common, as straight blades were more practical in combat. Moro kalis blades generally range in size from 18 to 26 inches (46 to 66 cm), though as with all Moro weapons there are exceptions. Generally however, the larger blades are found on later pieces, while the oldest Moro kalis tend to be of smaller stature. Damascene patterning is sometimes evident though often not as controlled as seen in the complex pattern welding of the smaller Malay keris.

=== Guard (gangya) ===
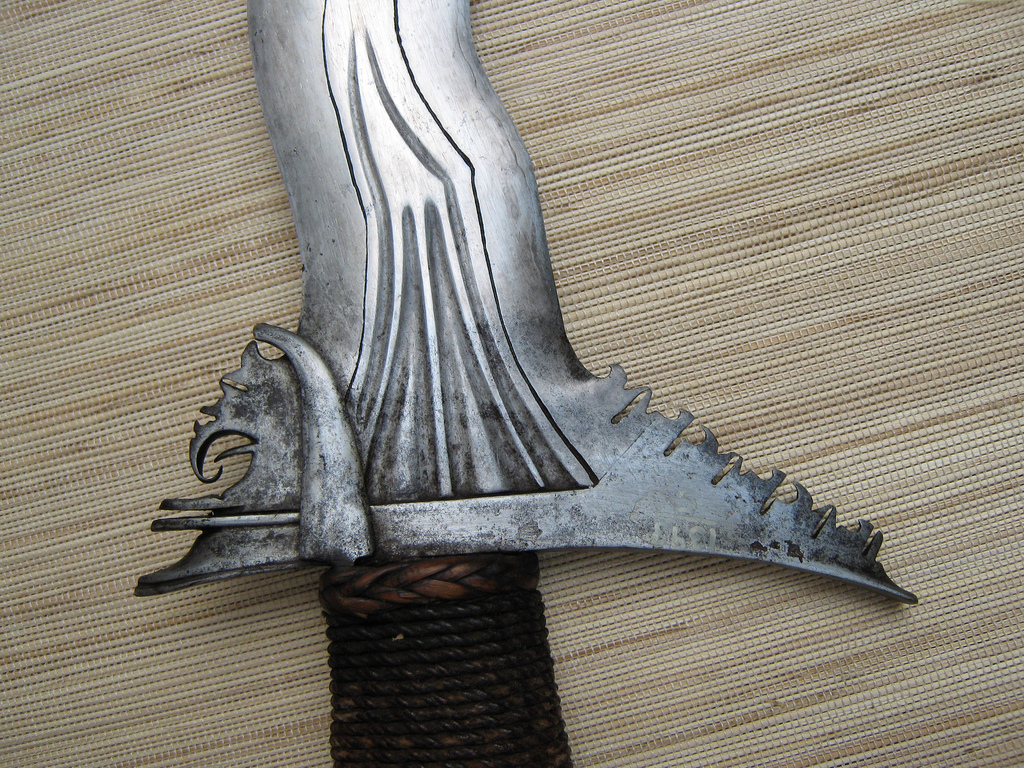
The demarcation line indicating the separate gangya (guard) can be seen.

The gangya (guard) of a kalis blade is made in such a manner that their lines flow very elegantly into the blade, never interrupting in continuity from transition from gangya proper to blade. Antique kalis (kalis made before 1930) were made with a separate gangya (guard) like their Malay cousins, while more modern made kalis lack this feature and have gangya that are in fact integral to the blade.

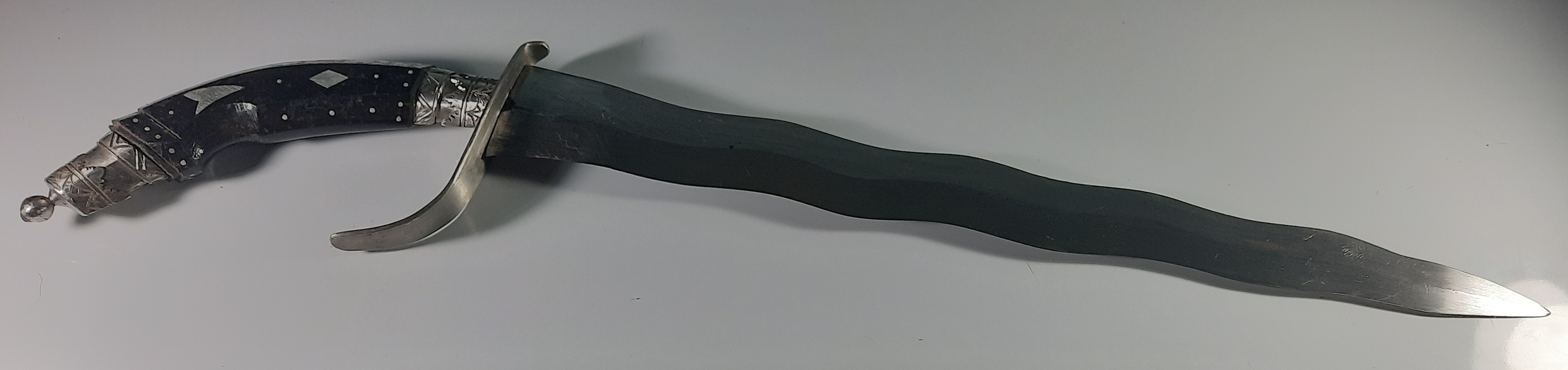
A Tagalog kalis with a Spanish-style guard

Some newer kalis do have an engraved line to simulate the appearance of a separate gangya, but when inspected closely it is evident that this is only a cosmetic engraved line, and not a true separate gangya. At some point near the early 19th century, gangya started to be made with a distinct 45-degree angle near the terminus. Opposite the hook-like fretwork on the gangya, exists a curved cavity. It has been suggested that this cavity is representative of the trunk of an elephant, others contend that it is the mouth of the naga (serpent) with the blade being the tail, and still others contend that it is in fact the open mouth of an eagle.

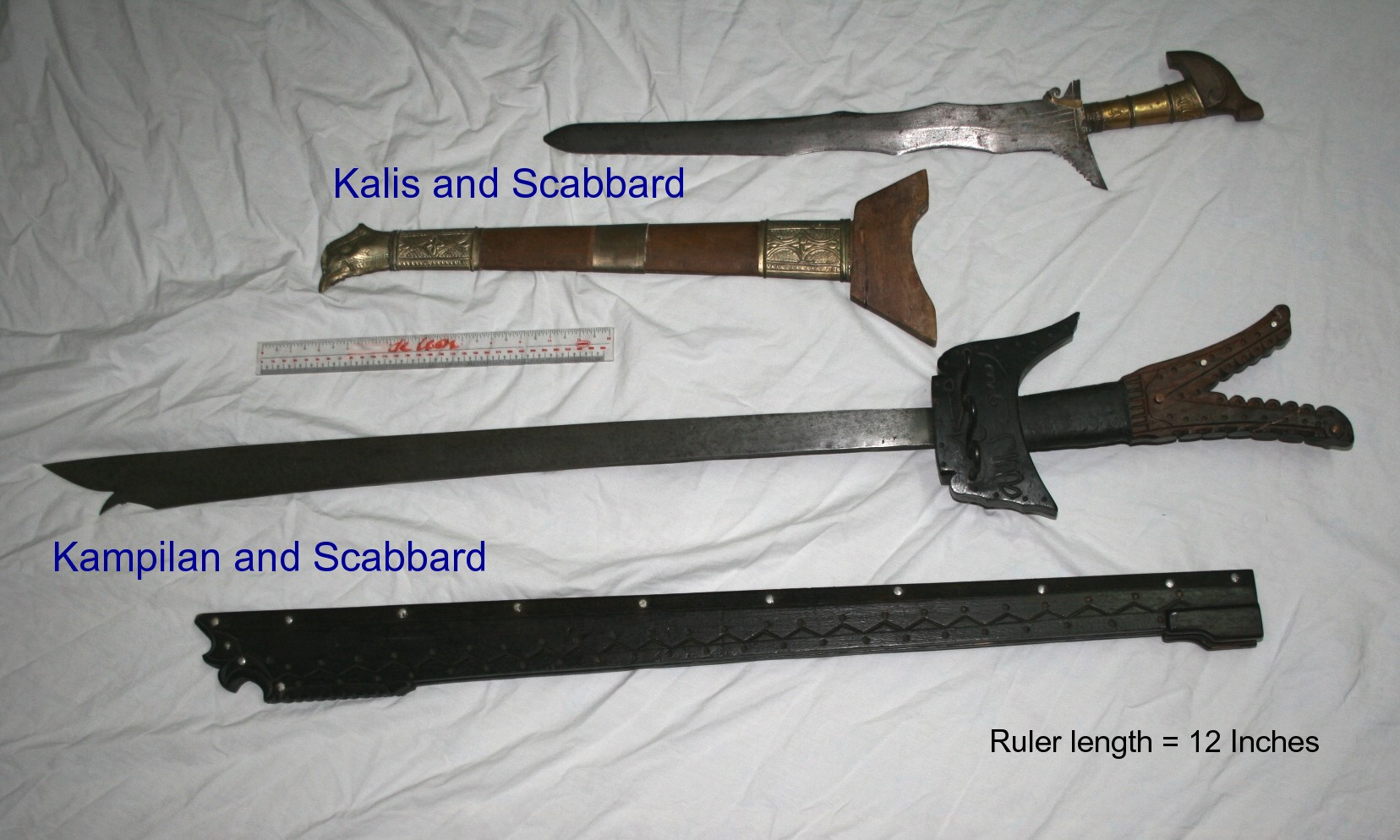
Two Filipino swords, a kampilan (longer, with a crocodile pommel) and a kalis (shorter, with a cockatoo pommel), photographed side by side to demonstrate their size relative to each other.

Modern tourist kalis blades can be distinguished by a number of features that once identified are quite easy to spot. Perhaps the easiest to identify feature of a modern tourist/fake kalis blade are the shaping of the waves. Traditional kalis feature gracefully undulating waves that are forged deep into the blade to penetrate straight to the centerline of the blade. Tourist kalis, on the other hand, feature shallow angular waves, that appear to be cut out of the steel rather than forged into the blade.

=== Hilt ===
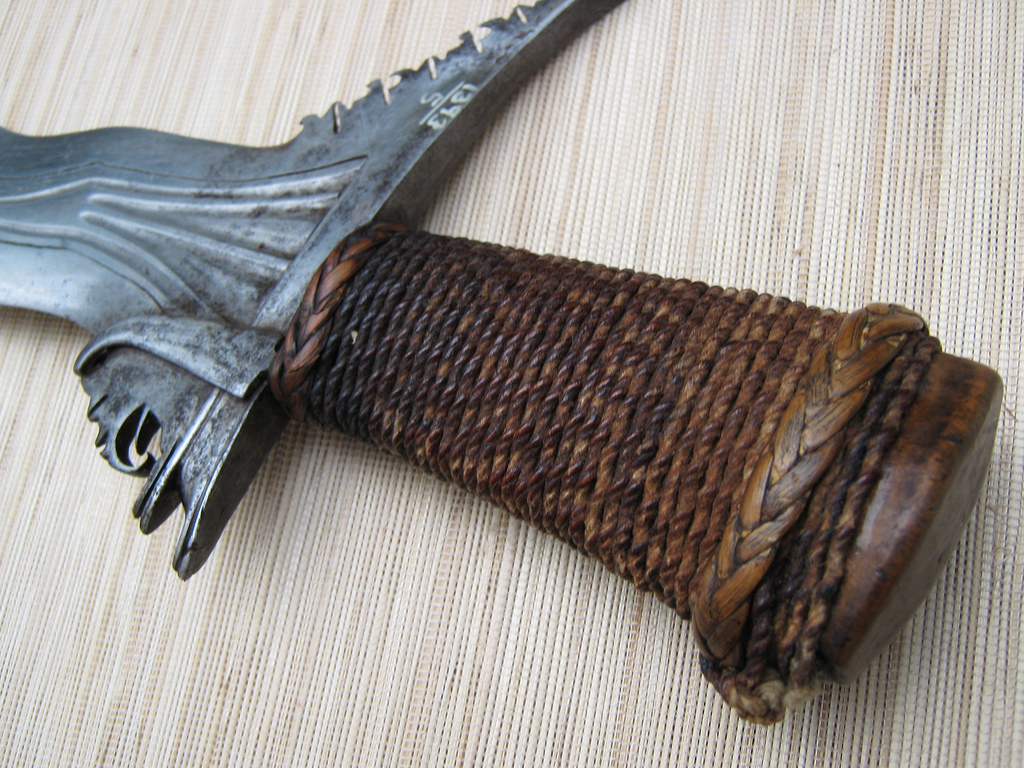
This example of a non-ornate pommel and simple hilt, wrapped in lacquered fiber for improved grip, is a style of kalis typically used by Moro warriors.

The hilt is either straight or slightly curved (most common on cockatoo (kakatua) pommel hilts). Pommel variations are many, however the most common are the horse-hoof (the most distinctive variation coming from the Sulu Sultanate) and the cockatoo. Commonly the pommel is made of beautiful hardwood burl (such as banati) with the hilt being wrapped in a lacquered natural fiber (such as jute). However, on higher end kalis, belonging to the upper class, the pommel would be made of such exotic materials as ivory, silver plating, solid brass, etc. with hilts often lavishly bound with silver or swasaa (an alloyed mixture of gold similar to red-gold) bands frequently with braided silver wire interspersing the chased bands.

=== Scabbard ===
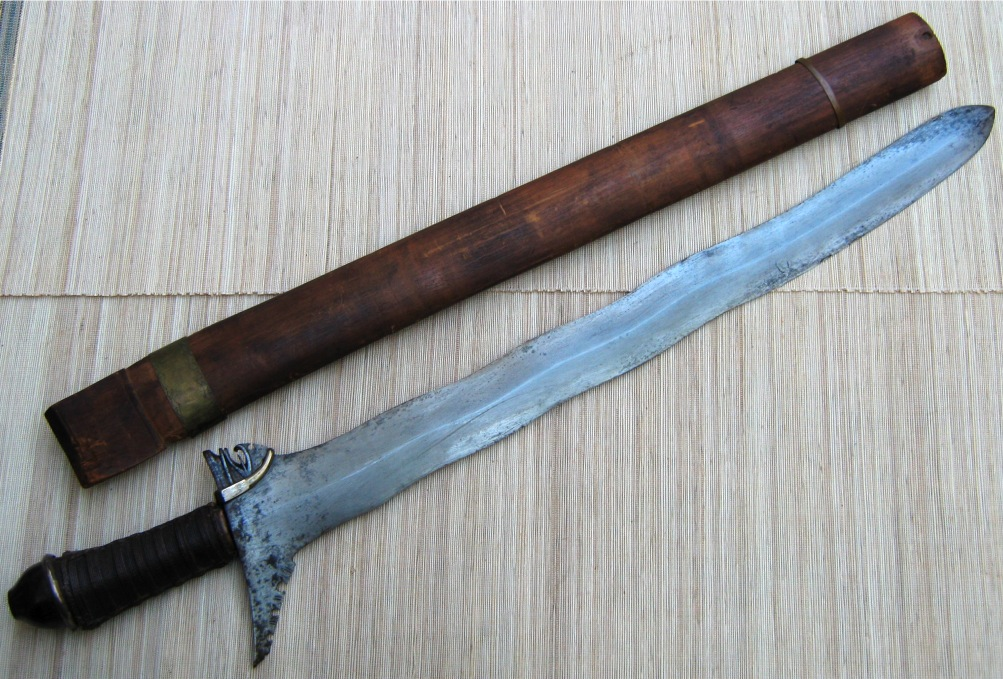
An example of a simple scabbard made of two loose pieces of wood, secured together by loops of brass.

The Moro kalis scabbard shares many common characteristics with their Malay cousins, but are unique in their own style and form. Scabbards tended to be made of wide grain native hardwoods (e.g. mahogany, teak, narra, etc.), and lashed together with rattan bindings. Sometimes the cross-piece is a separate piece, with the tail-piece socketed in, but quite often the cross-piece and tail are made of one board. Older scabbards feature wider rattan lashings, and normally only cover small sections (e.g. bottom 1/3, 4 inch bands, etc.) of the scabbard.

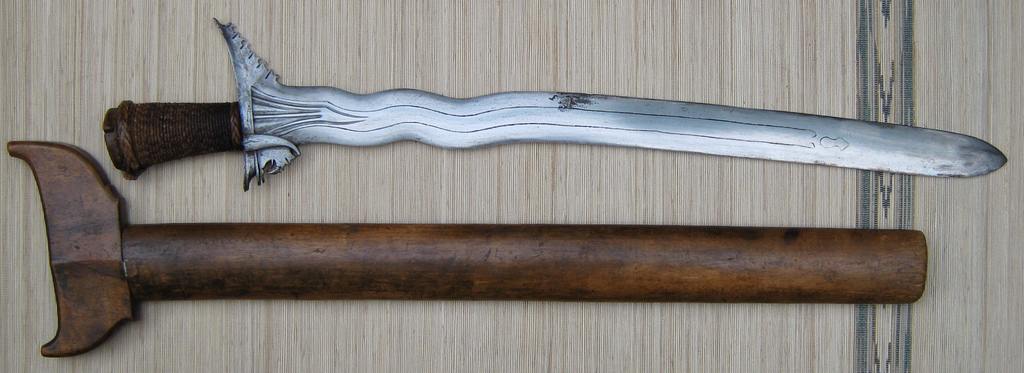
Kalis blades are wide at the base, double-edged, and can be waved, half-waved half-straight, or straight.

== Variants ==
Other keris-derived weapons in the Philippines include the balasiong sword and the punyal (or gunong) daggers.

== In media ==
- This weapon was featured in the American bladesmithing competition, Forged in Fire (TV series)'s season 1 episode 8.
- This weapon was featured in Arrow Season 3 Episode 9 when Oliver Queen fights Ras al Ghul.

== See also ==
- Filipino martial arts
- Indonesian martial arts
- Arnis
- Barong
- Bolo knife
- Klewang
- Kampilan
- Panabas
- Pinuti
