= Balarao =

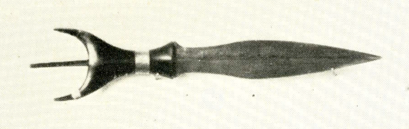
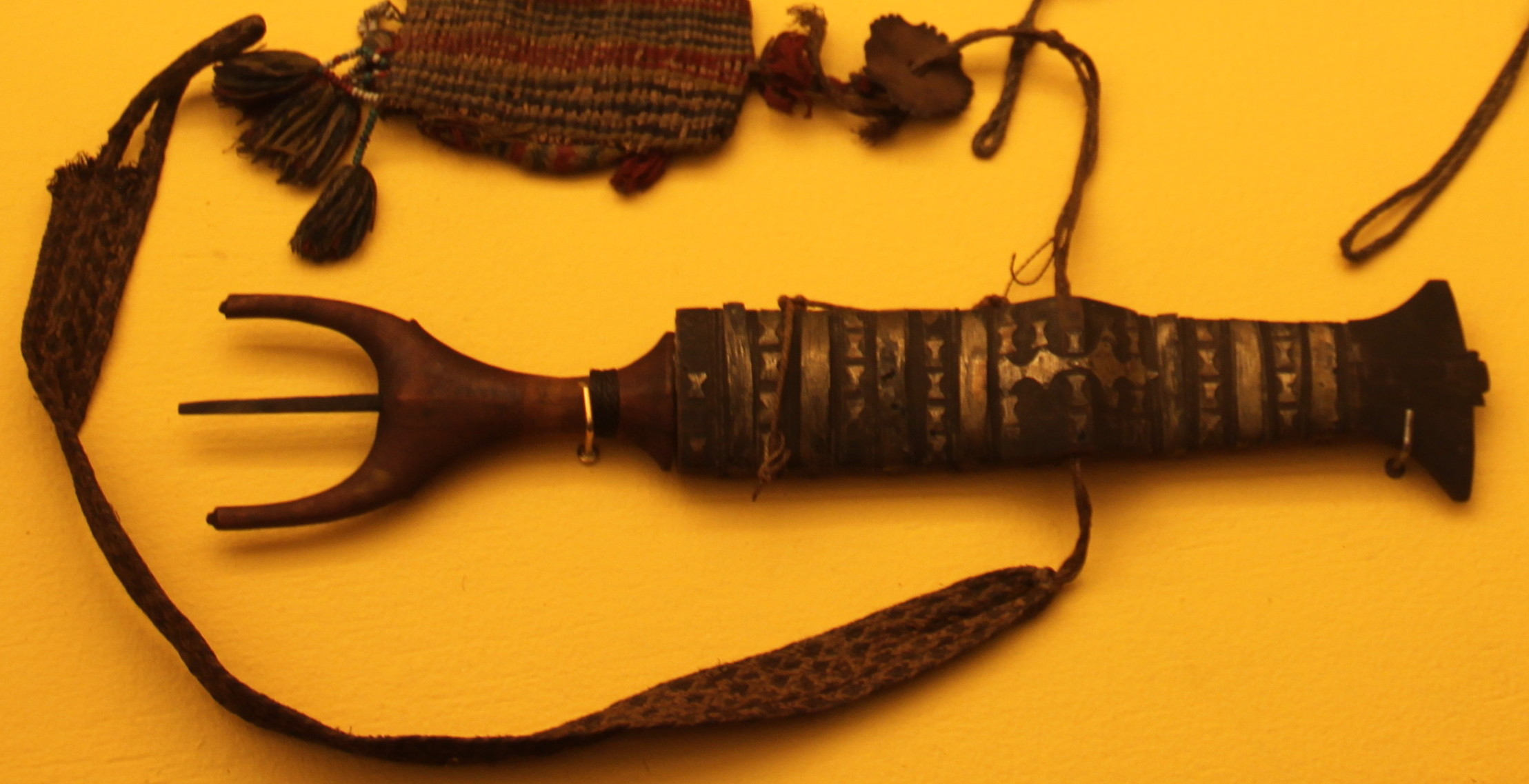
- Top: A balarao from the Mandaya people (c. 1926); Bottom: A Mandaya balarao in its sheath in the National Museum of Anthropology
- Type: Dagger
- Place of origin: Philippines

Specifications
- Length: 12 in (30 cm)
- Width: 4 in (10 cm)
- Blade type: Double-edged
- Hilt type: ivory, metal (gold, silver), hardwood, carabao horn
- Scabbard/sheath: hardwood, carabao horn, metal (gold, silver)

Balarao (also spelled balaraw, bararao, and bararaw), also known as "winged dagger", is a Filipino dagger used throughout the pre-colonial Philippines. It is unusually shaped, with a double-edged leaf-like blade and a finger-fitting grip consisting of two horn-like projections at the pommel and no guards. The tang also protrudes at the back. The dagger is a status symbol among nobility and warriors and is usually finely-worked with precious metals, ivory, and horn.

The dagger was described as early as the 1600s by Antonio de Morga, where he details its use by Visayans in headhunting raids. It disappeared throughout most of its range during the Spanish colonial period, though it survived to modern times among the Mandaya people, where it is known as the bayadau or badao (a name also used for gunong daggers).

The dagger, as bararao, has also been described as being used by the Sambal people for headhunting in the Boxer Codex (ca. 1590s).

== Gallery ==
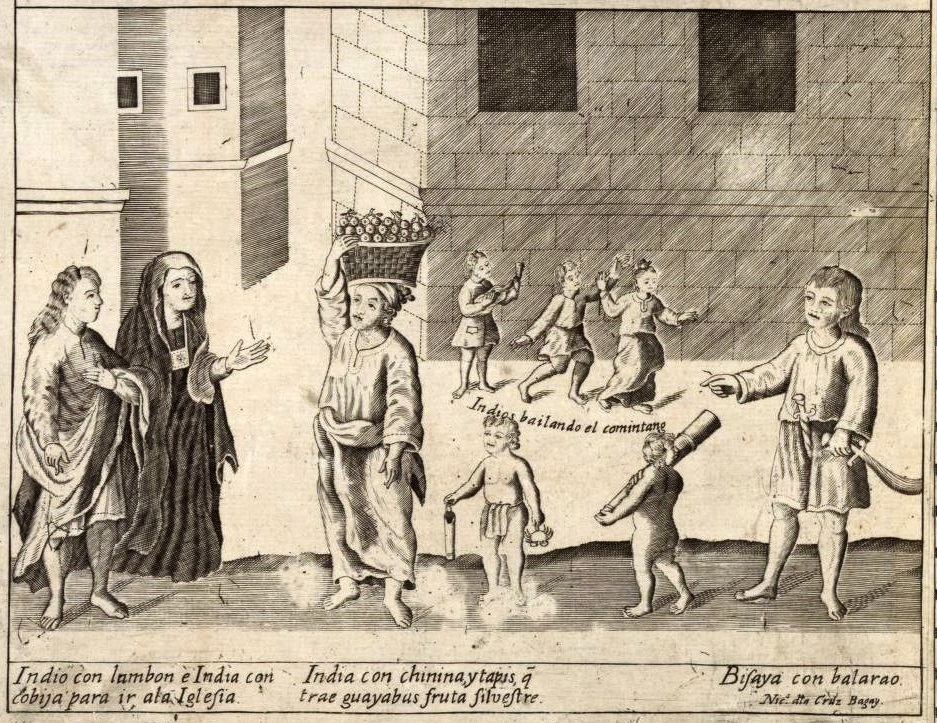
Detail from the Carta Hydrographica y Chorographica de las Yslas Filipinas (1734), showing a "Bisaya" with a balarao in the right

== See also ==
- Punyal
