= Weeder =

Tool for removing weeds

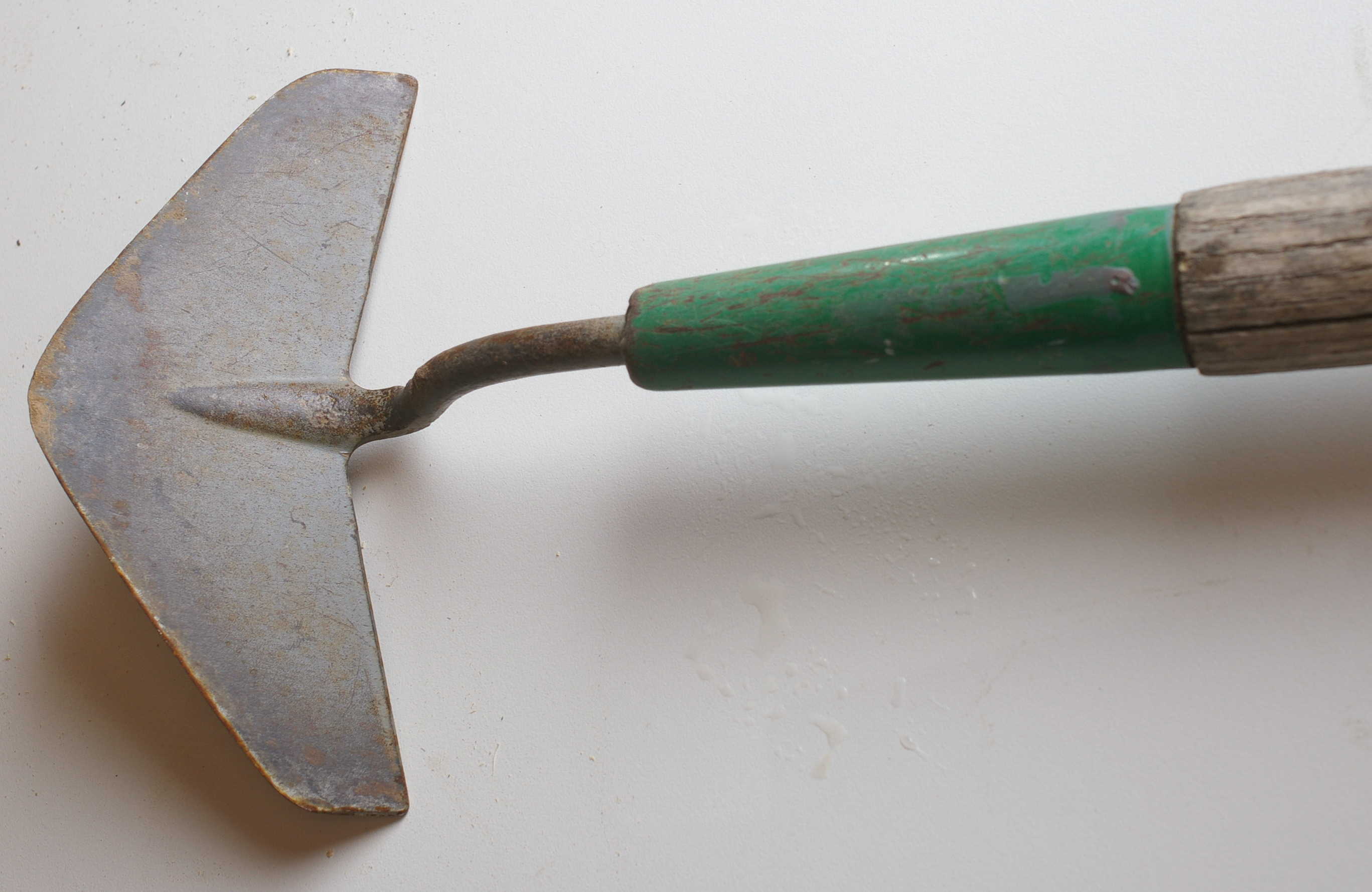
The head of a weeder

A number of common weeding tools are designed to ease the task of removing weeds from gardens and lawns.

== Tool types ==
- The fulcrum head weeder has a split tip like a serpent's tongue, and a long thin handle. Many models have a curved piece of metal along the handle which is put against the ground while the tip is digging. The curved metal piece acts as a fulcrum in a lever system. It is helpful to remove weeds either with a tap root or a fibrous root system.

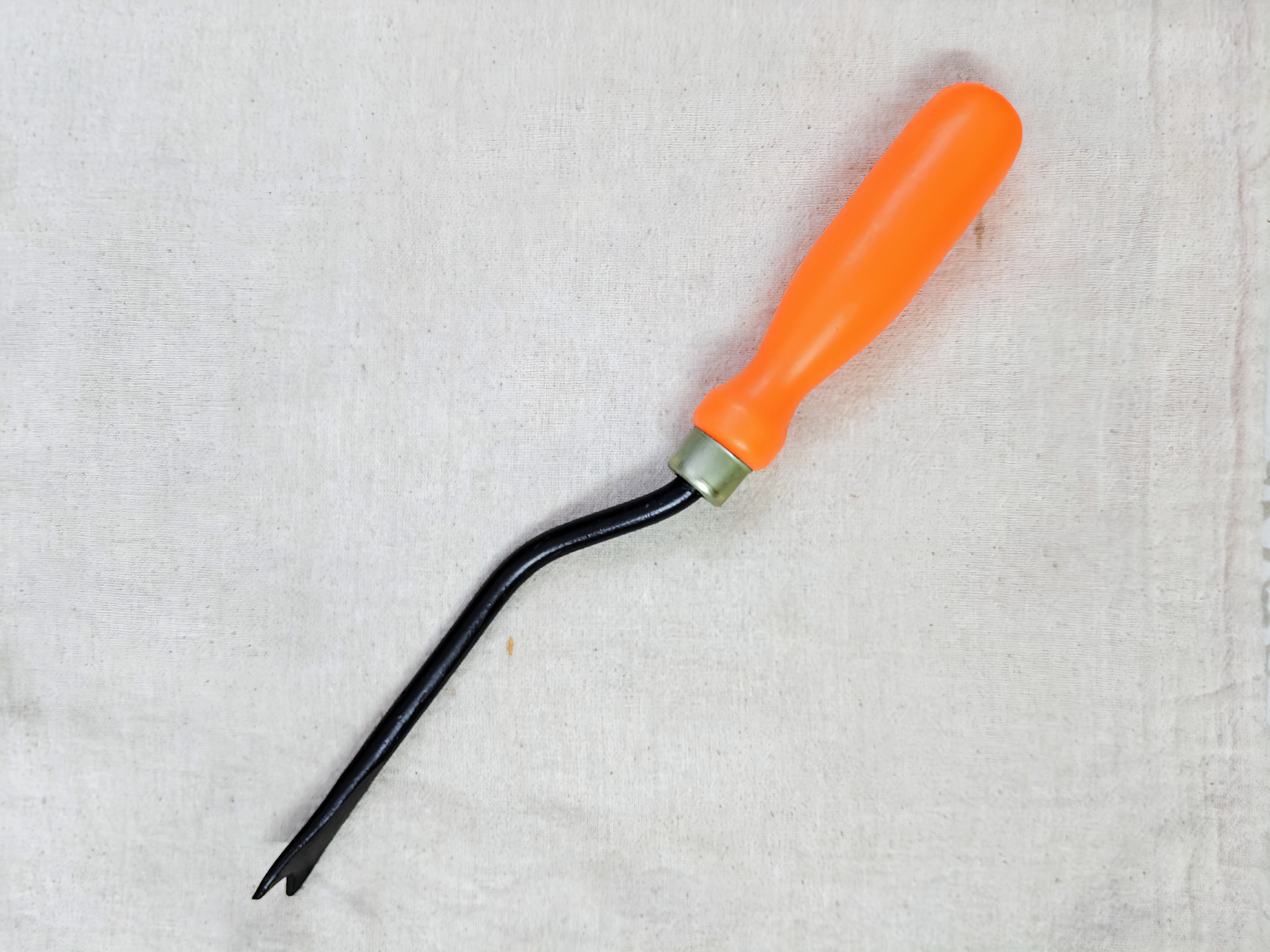
fulcrum head weeder tool

- The Cape Cod weeder has a long, thin handle and a triangular scraping head. When the handle is held parallel to the ground, the head points downward.
- The crack weeder is a relative of the Cape Cod Weeder. It is designed to scrape out weeds growing in crevices, stone walls and other deep and narrow places. The plane of the L-shaped scraping blade includes the handle; the bottom of the "L" is parallel to it.
- Guna is a short traditional knife with a wide flat tip used for digging and weeding in the Philippines.
- Homi is a short-handled traditional weeding and ploughing tool used by Korean People.

== See also ==
- Hoe

== Bibliography ==
- William Bryant Logan, Smith & Hawken The Tool Book, 1997
