= Dure =

Traditional Korean labor collectives

- Hangul: 두레
- RR: dure
- MR: ture

The dure (Korean: 두레) was a traditional system of collective labor within small farming communities in Korea. Farmers worked on each other's farms in order to increase total efficiency. Its practice differed by region, and there were numerous terms for and types of dure, including nongsa (농사), nonggye (농계), nongcheong (농청), nongak (농악), nonggi (농기), mokcheong (목청), gyaksa (갹사), dongne nonmegi (동네논매기), gilssam (길쌈), dolgae gieum (돌개기음).

Dure is basically a social system that uses agricultural labor intensively and intensively at limited times. The dure is a representative of the material culture that has been jointly farming, and was the chief of the nation's peasant lifestyle. Most of the rice farming areas had dure, because they developed with rice farming. And in the 17th-18th century, the development of the Yiang method resulted in a shortage of agricultural labor, which became a factor in the development of the dure.

A subcategory of dure is kilssam dure. While dure are organizations of men involved in rice farming, such as planting and rice paddies, kilssam dure are organizations of women in charge of domestic labor and field farming.

== Origin ==
The origin of the dure is generally found in the ancient clan community, although differences exist depending on scholars. Even during the Three Kingdoms period, rice farming was performed, and it was the origin of the dure, where people gathered and cultivated jointly for the purpose of farming. The dure was formed around the Samnam Area (삼남지방, 삼 usually refers to Chungcheong-do, Jeolla-do, Gyeongsang-do) gradually moved northward with the spread of the Yiang Act. The dure occurred in Gyeongsang-do and Jeolla-do among the Samnam Area the late 17th century, the Yi Ang Act spread not only to the south but also to the Gyoenggi-do.

Also, kilssam (meaning weaving) ure is a joint labor organization organized for Kilssam. Women worked together to accomplish the difficult and tedious task of weaving together. While the dure is an organized labor pool, the Kilssam Dure is a small-scale, random exchange of labor in private. Women used to form Kilssam dure in domestic labor and planting, field planting and harvesting of various field crops.

== History ==
Although the historical origin of the dure should go backward considerably, it began during the Joseon period with a systematic look that was passed down to modern Korean universities. The dure system was established under the Yiang Act (移秧法). As the Yiang Act was fully enforced, it was necessary to secure a large amount of labor at one time.

The Yiang Act was a breakthrough method of farming that allowed the removal of the defective mother to increase productivity and make the plantation work However, the Yiang Act required collective and short-term labor. Collective planting had to take place during the spring and intensive labor was needed for the herbicide work. Since planting and gimaegi (weeding) were often performed simultaneously, the labor force was needed intensively in a short period of time during the spring and summer. Clearly, the Yiang Act has resulted in a decrease in labor and an increase in output, but the amount and intensity of unit-hour labor required to be put in have rather increased. Thus, in rural areas, the Dure organization, which organises the peasant culture and supplies the necessary labor, will inevitably emerge.

The extinction of the dure can be divided into the extinction of the end of Japanese colonial rule, the immediate extinction of liberation, the end of the Korean War, the disappearance of the 50s, the disappearance of the 60s, and the disappearance of the late 70s. The largest number of dure have disappeared from the end of the Japanese colonial rule until right after the Korean War. At the end of Japanese colonial rule, the dure disappeared due to forced labor, public delivery, and rural decomposition. It was widely practiced after liberation, but the war-torn society has led to the disappearance of the majority of the dure. Remaining dure continued into the 1950s and then largely disappeared as Korea rapidly industrialized. In some cases, it may have been extended late, but it is very rare.

== Operation ==
The dure was formed as a group of natural villages. However, when natural villages are small, they grouped together to form a dure. In case of a large village, one natural village was divided into a few and made a dure. In addition, a few natural villages joined under the name 'hap-dure' to expand the size of the dure by combining several small groups of dure. Dure had to have at least 10 members. This is because more than 10 people are efficient in working together and have the effect of increasing work. And the dure for agricultural production was mainly organized and operated intensively when the homogeneous work was carried out on planting and rice paddies.

The mobilization of the workforce under dure was basically compulsory. In each family, one jangjeong (person who could serve in the military), had to participate. In the Joseon period, military service was targeted at the ages of 16 to 60.

== Types ==
=== Dong-Dure ===
Dong-Dure is a large-scale dure, which is organized by the entire village, this dong-dure organization carried out joint labor and organized the dure-gut according to strict rules.

=== Dure ===
While Dong-Dure is a mandatory organization of entire village, dure is a voluntary and partially organized work group based on mutual benefit only for joint processing of farming work.

=== Nongsa-Dure ===
It is a dure related to farm work. Examples include the gimaegi dure, which performs gimaegi, and the Pulbegi Dure, which cuts grass jointly.

=== Kilssam-Dure ===
It is a women's group derived mainly from a dure performed by women, and is a dure for weaving.

== See also ==
- Culture of Korea
- Nong-ak
- Cooperative
- Agricultural cooperative
