= Gunong =

Short knife from the Philippines

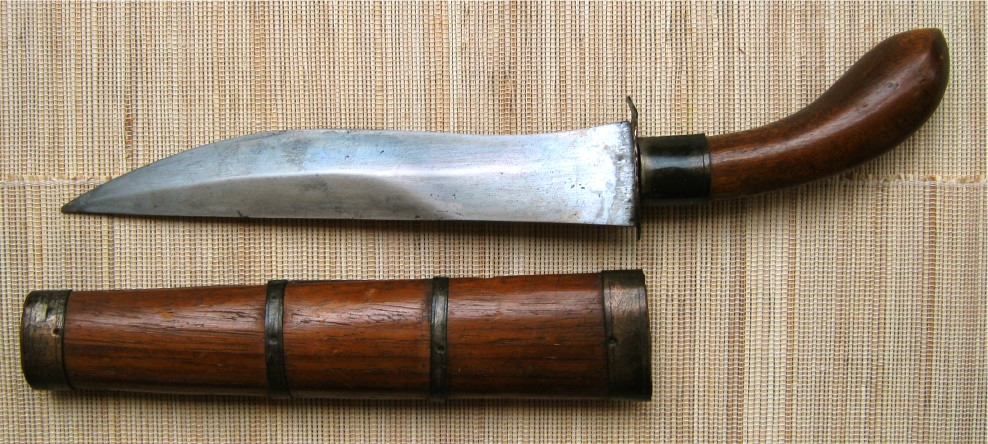
An antique gunong from Mindanao.

The gunong is a knife from Mindanao and the Visayas islands of the Philippines. In the ancient past, it was called bunong by the Tagalog people. It is essentially a diminutive form of the larger kalis or kris. The gunong serves both as a utility knife and as a thrusting weapon used for close quarter fighting—usually as a last defense. It is most often associated with the Maranao, among whom the gunong was traditionally carried by both sexes, although it exists in other cultures throughout Mindanao and the Visayas. The weapon is generally tucked into the back of a waist sash.

The gunong is one of many bladed weapons portrayed in the "Weapons of Moroland" plaque that has become a common souvenir item and pop culture icon in the Philippines. It is also known as gulok among the Maranao and Maguindanao people; punyal (also known as puñal de kris or kris knife) among Visayans and the Yakan people; and badao among the Lumad people (which also applies to the balarao daggers).

== History ==
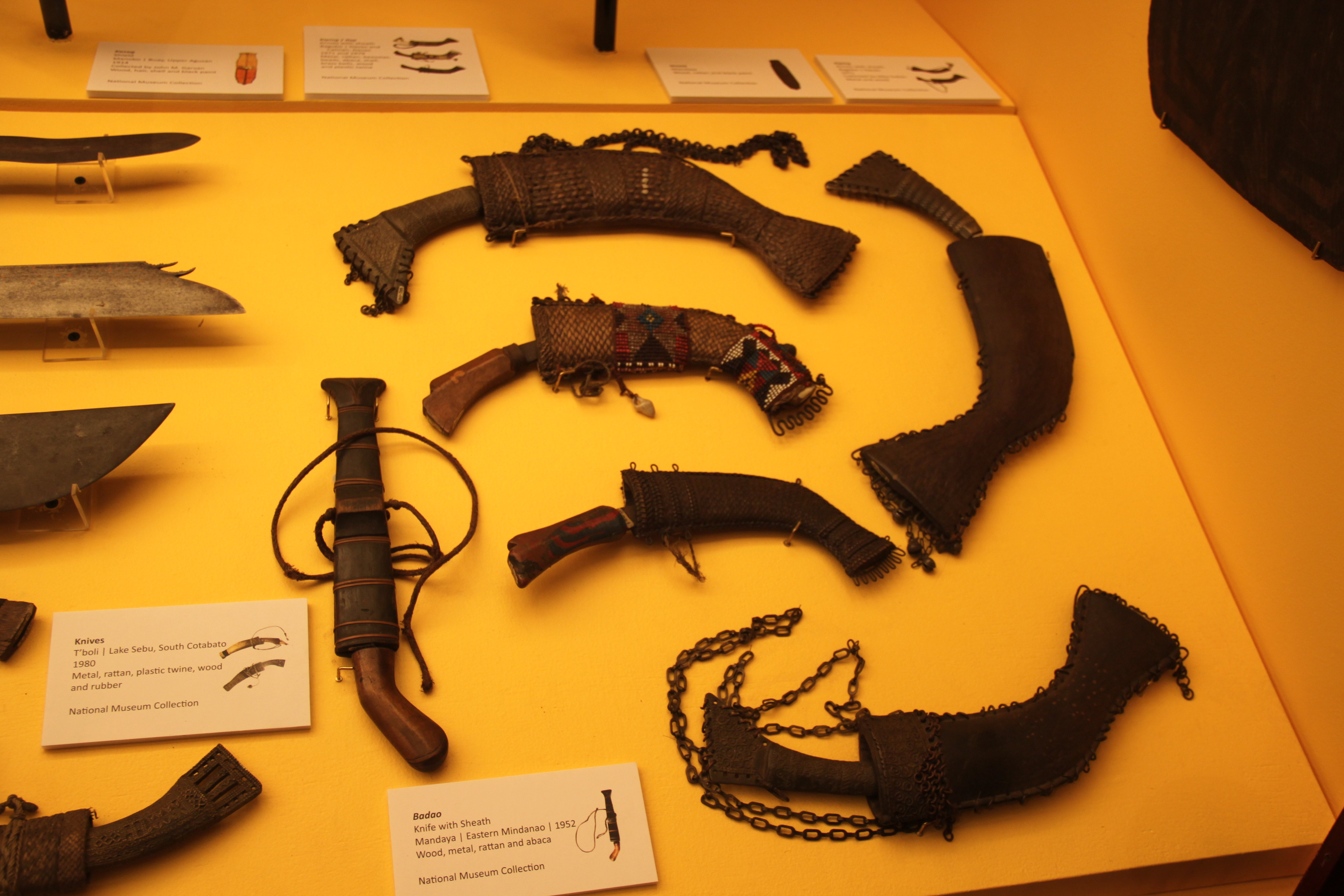
T'boli and Mandaya badao daggers with sheaths in the National Museum of Anthropology

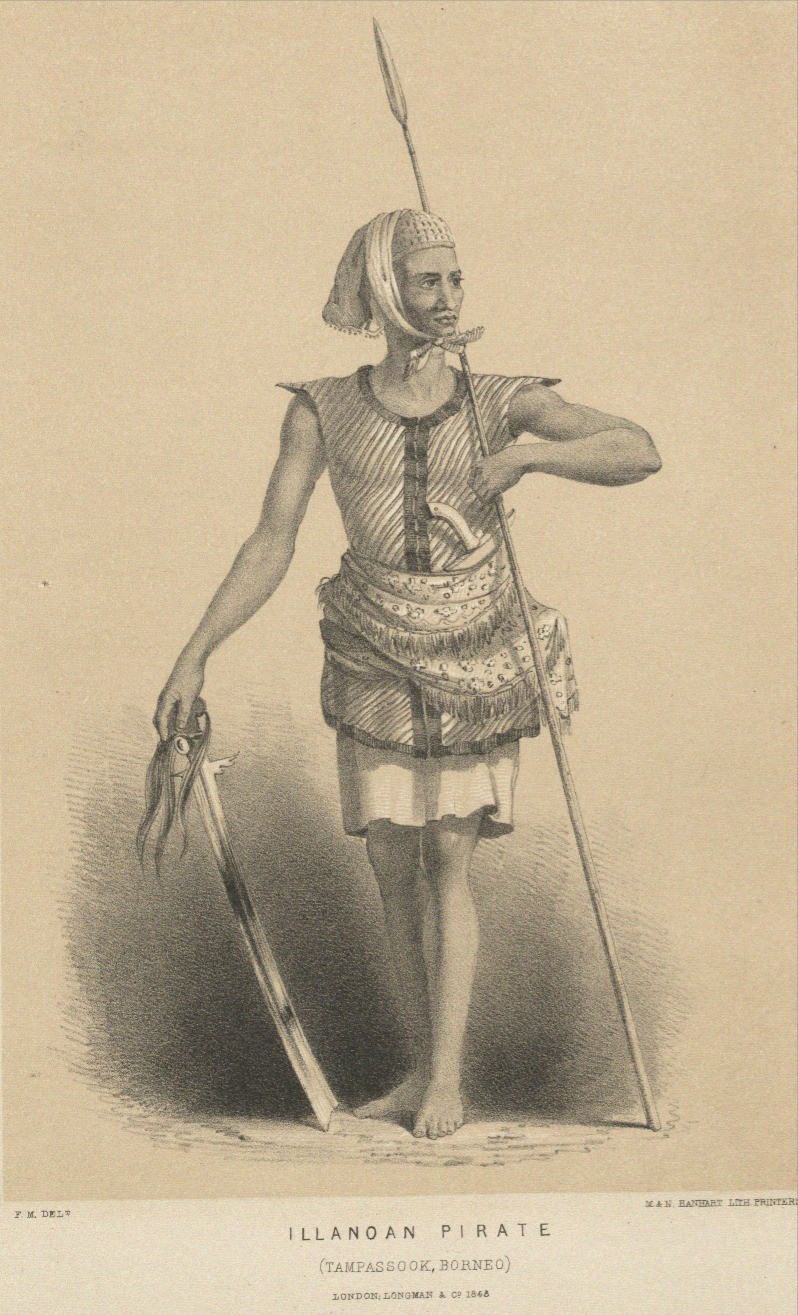
An Iranun pirate from Sabah (formerly part of the Sultanate of Sulu), with a kampilan, a gunong dagger tucked in his sash, and a budjak (spear)

The gunong is a dagger variant of the kalis, a Philippine sword derived from the Indonesian kris dagger. The gunong is most commonly found in the ethnic groups of Mindanao. The tribes carried blades as part of their regular attire, both as a precaution for self-defense and for accomplishing daily tasks.

While the gunong dates back centuries before colonial times, it became more prevalent in 1915 when General John J. Pershing issued an order outlawing the wearing of swords. Now unable to carry traditional machetes or broadswords, people turned to the gunong to fill the gap without arousing the fears of the American colonial authorities. Around this time, the gunong became larger and was crafted with a pistol-grip handle rather than the old straight hilts. More extravagant fittings with chased bands on scabbards, belt clips, guards, and bulbous ferrules also became common. After World War II, thinner-bladed gunong were made from newer materials like nickel and aluminium.

The name punyal may be traced to puñal, the Spanish word for "dagger".

== Anatomy ==
As with its larger relative, the kris or kalis, the gunong can be either straight or wavy-bladed. The blade may be single or double-edged and broadens towards the hilt to protect the bearer's fingers. The sheath and the handle can be made from either wood or metal. The style of the hilt can be used to differentiate modern pieces from those made before the American occupation.

== See also ==
- Balarao
- Kalis
- Guna

== Sources ==
- Greaves, Ian; Jose Albovias Jr.; Federico Malibago. "Sandata: The Edged Weapons of the Philippines". History of Steel in East Asia. Macau Museum of Art.
- "Gunong". Sandata: Traditional Filipino Weapons. Traditional Filipino Weapons, LLC. Archived from the original on 2008-09-24.
