= List of Arnis systems and practitioners =

This is a list of notable Arnis systems and practitioners.

== Practiced/Practitioners in the Philippines ==
Systems that directly originated from the Philippines and have practitioners residing in the Philippines. Not all systems have particular names, as older practitioners only called their arts generic names like Arnis baston, escrima, etc.

- Abaniko Tres Puntas Classical Arnis, founded by Mateo Estolloso, specialized in baston, cuchillo, espada y daga, dumog-ipit. Actual Grand Master of the system is Rene Tongson.
- Eskrima of God,
- Arnes DRev. Father Miguel Ortega of Argao from Cebu focused on k and g taught by Lo One of his top student was Filemon Cañete, founder of San Miguel Eskrima and San Carlos San Miguel Eskrima. it" Albano and Gregorio "Goyong" Ceniza, then to Eduardo "Boy" Ceniza who is the current Grand Master. Senior students: Felipe Dabor, Cronie Cabatingan, Vernon Ompoc and Rene Capangpangan.
- Balintawak Eskrima - Founded in 1952 by Venancio "Anciong" Bacon after internal dispute amongst some of the original founders of the original Doce Pares club.
- - Balintawak-Sugbu - Balintawak Sugbu follows the original teaching method of Villasin Balintawak. Founder GM Carlo "Kaloy" Campaña
- Bakbakan International - Founded by Antonio Diego, Rey Galang, Christopher Ricketts, senior students of Tatang Ilustrisimo.
- Kritters Group Balintawak-Marapao Aggression System (KGB-MAGGS) Founded by JunJun Marapao under the lineage of Dr. Evencio Marapao of TEOVEL's Balintawak Original
- Biagtan Ayura Cinco Teros - Founded by Maestro Raysaldo Biagtan, former Team Muaythai Philippines, ISKA Champion, World Silver Medalist, also founder of Biagtan Muaythai MMA and Author of the book "The Art Of Cinco Teros" Northern Philippines System.
- Black Scorpion Arnis founded by Capt. Arthur Cuadrante Teodosio, reserve officer of the Philippine Army, in 1969.
- De Campo Uno-Dos-Tres Orihinal (De Campo 1-2-3) – founded by Jose Caballero. A notable practitioner of the system was Manuel Caballero, Jose's son.
- Derobio Escrima - founded by grandmaster Braulio Pedoy.
- Doce Pares Eskrima - Originally encompassed 12 styles and was founded by the Saavedra and Cañete families in 1932. There are now several Doce Pares groups headed by various members of the Cañete family.
- Eskrido - Founded by Ciriaco "Cacoy" Cañete, the last remaining founder of Doce Pares Eskrima.
- Garimot Arnis - Led by Gat Puno Abon "Garimot" Baet.
- Jendo - was developed by Grandmaster Jonathan Makiling Abaya in Mandaluyong City. Despite being an empty-hand based martial arts system, Jendo also utilizes traditional Filipino weaponry including arnis, bankaw (spear/long pole), balisong knife, soteco ring, and dulo-dulo stick.
- KaJuKenBo Escrima - Grandmaster Adriano Directo Emperado (also known as Sijo Emperado), is one of the Americas’ Internationally recognized Martial Artist Grandmasters. He is the Co-Founder of KaJuKenBo, a world recognized style of Street Emptyhand and weaponry Self-Defense. KaJuKenBo Escrima Co-Founded by David Ducay, Max Pallen and the Emil Bautista a Filipino stick-fighting and weaponry self-defense system.
- Lapunti Arnis de Abanico - a style synthesized by Felimon Caburnay and Johnny Chiuten
- Kalis Ilustrisimo - Founded by Antonio "Tatang" Ilustrisimo; important as the ancestor of many current eskrima systems. Some senior students are Antonio "Tony" Diego, Epifanio "Yuli" Romo, Christopher "Topher" Ricketts, Rey Galang and Romeo Macapagal
- Jose Rizal practiced Arnis de Mano from Laguna
- Kombatan - founded by Ernesto Presas, brother of Remy Presas.
- Lameco Eskrima - Founded by Edgar Sulite. The name comes from the three ranges of the system, Largo (Spanish for "long"), Medio ("medium"), and Corto ("short"). It is a composite of many systems with heavy influence from De Campo 1-2-3 and Kalis Illustrisimo.
- Arnis Lanada - Grandmaster Porfirio S. Lanada (also known as Proferio Lanada), is one of the Philippines’ Internationally recognized Arnis Grandmasters. He is the founder of Arnis Lanada, a world recognized style of Filipino stick-fighting.
- Lapunti Arnis de Abanico - a style synthesized by Felimon Caburnay and Johnny Chiuten
- Lightning Scientific Arnis International (LSAI) - Founded by Benjamin Luna Lema in 1937. Lightning Scientific Arnis is a system that revolves around the concept of Tercia Serrada Cadenilla y Espada y Daga which is a method of intercepting and redirecting attacks and blind-siding the opponent by going to the off-side and blanketing him with a barrage of continuous strikes.
- Modern Arnis - Founded by Remy Presas, which has roots in the Presas family and Balintawak system. It is revolutionary for having pioneered a system that made teaching of Arnis easier for students as old-school systems were often very painful for the student, thus making it hard to attract students and keep the arts alive.
- Palasan Eagles Daite Ilustrisimo Eskrima - Founded by Jaime Quizana, Arnis SEA Games and World Champion who was a former student of the legendary Bahad Zubu Grand Master Yuli Romo. The style is rooted in Bahad Zubu and Kalis Ilustrisimo.
- Pekiti Tirsia Kali - Founded by Conrado Tortal and carried on by Leo Tortal Gaje, inheritor of the family system of the Tortal clan. The name means "to cut into pieces at close range", although it includes techniques for all ranges. One of the most recognized blade-oriented systems. It is one of the systems used by the Force Reconnaissance Group.
- Dinampo Eskrima, founded by Late Santos "Noy" Dinampo, student of Lorenzo Saavedra and Anciong Bacon, specialized in Baston, Dubli Baston, cuchillo, espada y daga, dumog kauig.
- Regino Ilustrisimo, cousin of Antonio "Tatang" Ilustrisimo
- San Miguel Eskrima - As one of the founders (together with the famous Doring and Ensong Saavedra) of the Labangon Fencing Club in 1920 and later the Doce Pares Club in 1932, Filemon "Momoy" Cañete (student of Father Miguel Ortega) created the blade based San Miguel Eskrima, as his personal expression of Ortega Family (called San Carlos San Miguel Eskrima) and the Doce Pares art and Eskrima of God methodology .
- Erik Manuevo - current practitioner and Founder of the Black Dragon clan, former member of the Red Lords of Death and the second western winner of the Kumite in 1995.
- Tabak ni Bonifacio with Buenaventura Mirafuente and Placido Yambao
- Tat Kon Tou and Banate created by Jose Millan, student of Anciong Bacon.
- Rapido Realismo Kali International (RRKI) is a Filipino fighting system officially christened in April 1997 by Grandmaster Henry Espera. It is a Filipino self defense system with traditional roots adapted for modern times.
- Ensayo Kali Tactical was founded by Guro Gerald Pilapil in Malabon in 2015 and is an offshoot system from Rapido Realismo Kali. It is a traditional Filipino martial art focused on modern tactical self defense for real situations and does not focus on sport.

== International Systems ==
Systems which were consolidated and codified overseas, or where practitioners are no longer residing in the Philippines, but abroad.

=== Filipino-American Systems/Practitioners ===
- Arnis Balite - founded by Pundador Manuel Aguillon in Zambales, currently carried on by Punong Guro Steven K. Dowd, publisher of FMA Informative. Aside from practicing Arnis, Aguillon was a boxer who was said to move so fast that he was nicknamed "Kid Balite", after the Balete tree which is said to be the dwelling place of ghosts and spirits in Philippine folklore.
- Bahala Na Escrima - Founded by Leo Giron, named after The Bahala Na (Come what may) Intelligence Company which he was a part of in World War II. Giron and his company were the eyes and ears of Gen. Douglas MacArthur and were infiltrated into the island of Luzon where they fought hand-to-hand against katana-wielding Japanese troops.
- Burton Richardson
- Cabales Serrada Escrima - brought to Stockton, California by Angel Cabales
- Floro Villabrile
- Florendo M. Visitacion - Founder and developer of Vee Jitsu.
- Inosanto Kali - developed by Dan Inosanto from various other styles; he does not call it a system in its own right, but rather a blend of systems from John Lacoste and others.
- Integrated Eskrima - Integrated Eskrima is a pan-Philippine method of Filipino weapon training as developed and taught by Dr. Mark V Wiley. As a master practitioner of several systems of Eskrima and Arnis, Dr. Mark studied under the direction of the legendary masters Angel Cabales, Herminio Binas, Antonio Ilustrisimo, Benjamin Luna Lema, Ramiro Estalilla, Remy Presas, and Florendo Visitacion.
- Juanito "Johnny" LaCoste
- Ben Largusa
- Latigo y Daga - Whip and dagger method founded by Tom Meadows.
- Brandon Lee - age eight, Dan Inosanto started training the film actor. Lee said that with his training Arnis with Inosanto which lasted until his teens, he specialized in both Kali and Escrima and focused on it for three to four years. Lee would eventually return in his mid twenties.
- Bonifacio Lonzaga
- Pedro Apilado
- Terry Lim
- Sayoc Kali - founded by Baltazar "Bo" Sayoc, the system promotes the "all blade, all the time" methodology of Filipino Martial Arts. The family system is now led by Christopher Sayoc.
- Sistema Birada - founded by Rogelio "Roger" Solar, the system focuses on continuous multiple strikes. This system teaches practitioners how to follow through on their attack. If a strike is blocked, it is followed continuously by strikes to the area opened by the opponent when the first strike was blocked.
- Telesforo Subing-Subing
- Teofisto "Tobby" Tobosa

=== Europe ===
- Guba Doce Pares - is a system headed by Danny Guba, based in London UK

== See also ==
- Filipino martial arts
