= Sibat =

Pole weapon used by natives of the Philippines

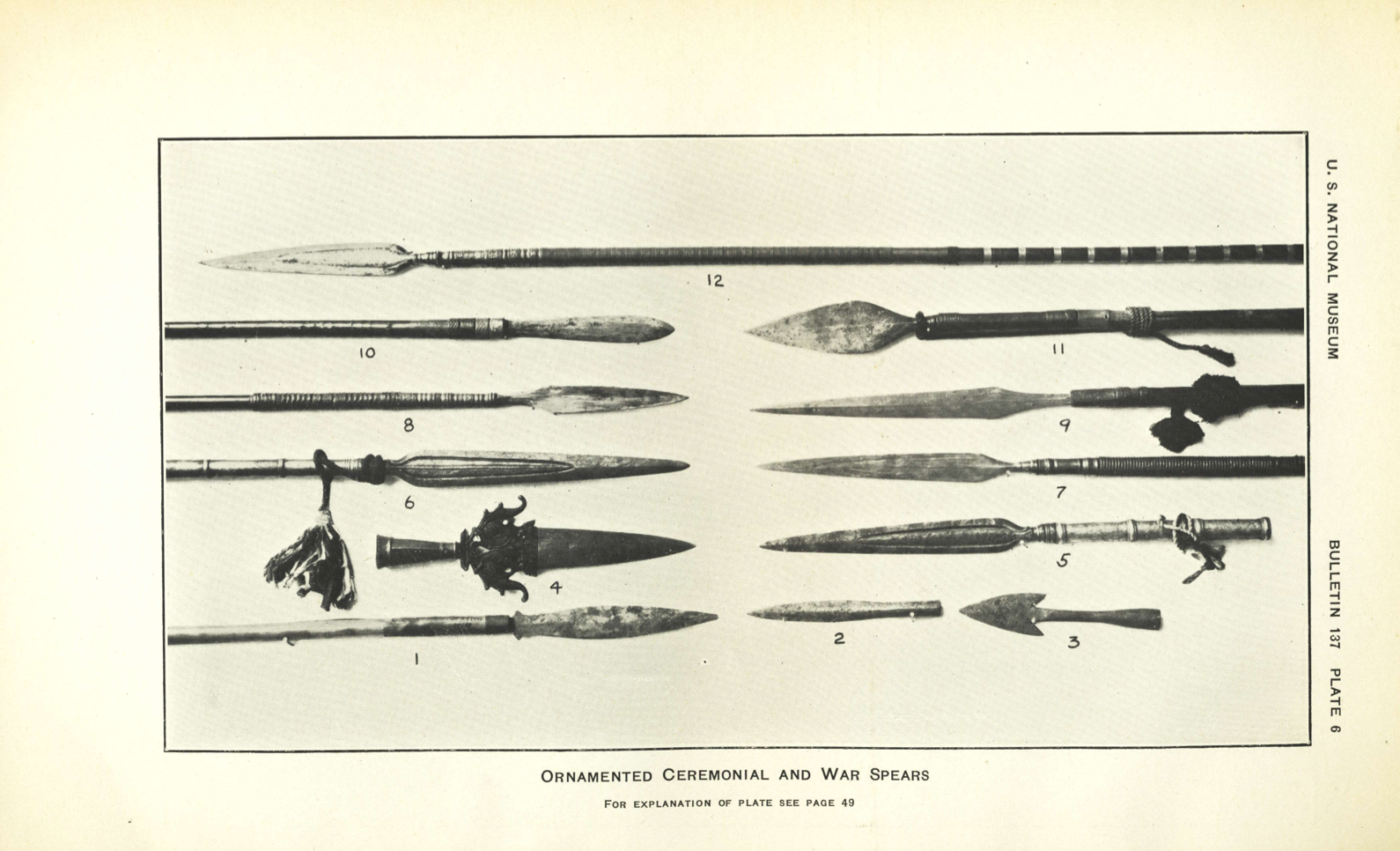
Various iron ceremonial and war spears from the Philippines with silver and brass inlay on the shafts

Sibat is a type of spear used as a weapon or tool by natives of the Philippines. The term is used in Tagalog and Kinaray-a. It also called bangkaw, sumbling or palupad in the islands of Visayas and Mindanao; and budjak (also spelled bodjak or budiak) among Muslim Filipinos in western Mindanao and the Sulu Archipelago.

Sibat are typically made with rattan, bamboo, bahi or other hardwood, either with a sharpened tip or a head made from metal. These heads may either be single-edged, double-edged or barbed. Styles vary according to function and origin. For example, a sibat designed for fishing may not be the same as those used for hunting wild game such as boar.

According to Kalis Ilustrisimo archivist Romeo Macapagal, in Kapampangan, it is known as tandos or tandus and a fishing harpoon with 3 or more prongs is a salapang in both Tagalog and Kapampangan.

According to Filipino martial arts researcher and author Celestino Macachor, a shorter version of the Visayan bangkaw in Cebu is the sapang, around 38 inches (97 cm) in length and a thrusting weapon, and a budiak or bodjak is a Moro weapon that is about the same length as the bangkaw, but heavier.

In the Mountain Province of Luzon, the Igorot people have different versions of them such as the fan′-kao and kay-yan′, and the fal-fĕg′ war spear of the Bontoc people.

The sibat/bangkaw is widely used in Arnis systems such as San Miguel Eskrima, Modern Arnis, Kombatan, Inayan Eskrima and Pekiti-Tirsia Kali.

== Techniques ==
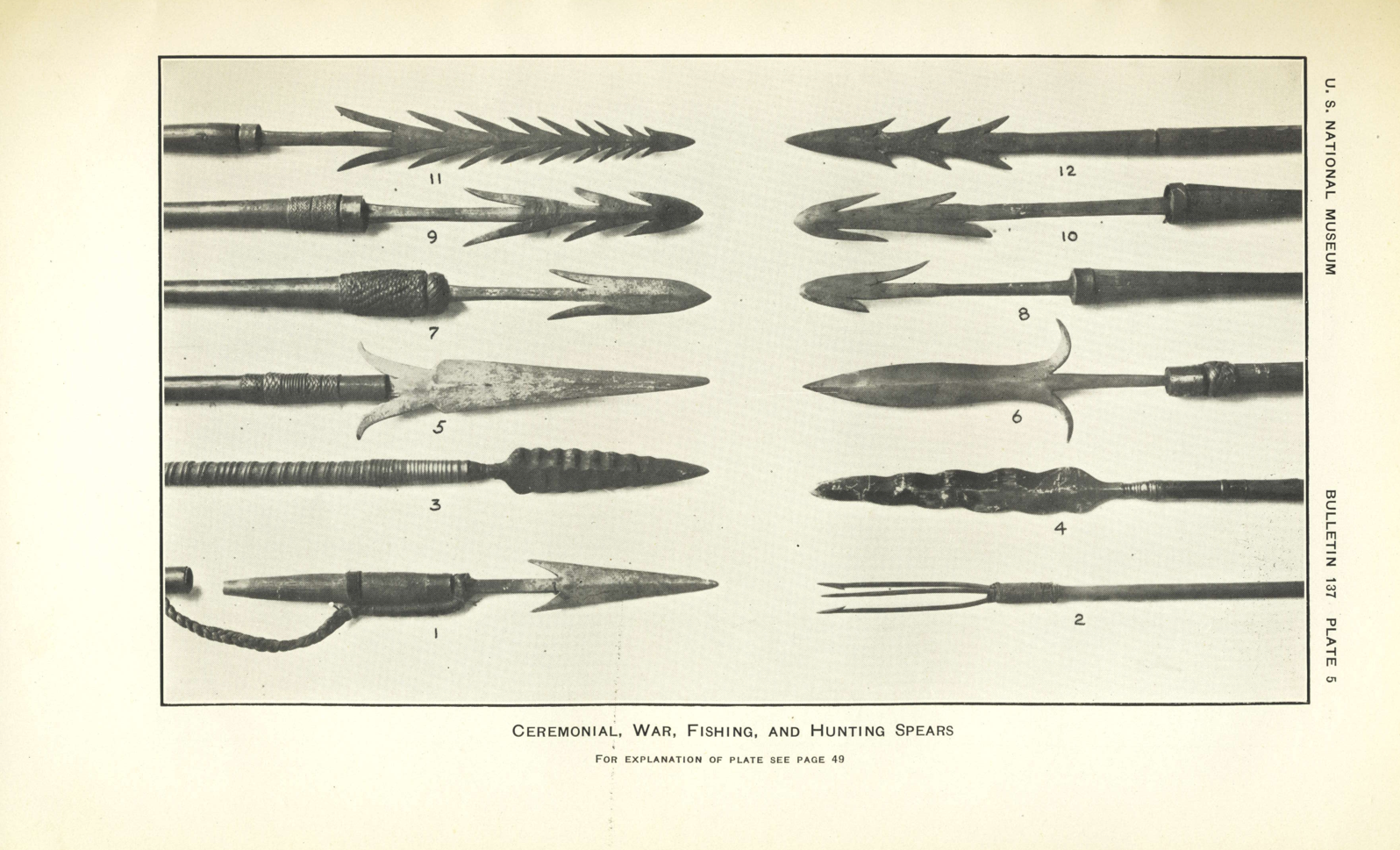
Ceremonial, war, fishing, and hunting spears and harpoons of the Philippines

Sibat can either be used hand-to-hand or thrown from a distance. Blunt portions of the weapon could be used to incapacitate at closer ranges. These attacks can be used in conjunction; the shaft can be used to block an enemy's weapon and then followed with a thrust into the throat or stomach.

In the Ilocano fighting arts of Kabaroan learned by Grandmaster Ramiro Estalilla, 2 spears (Ilocano: gayáng) can be used at the same time, with the second spear held with a grip in the middle and used as a shield. When one spear is thrown, the practitioner can then draw his blade and dual wield with a blade and spear.

The Igorot and Aeta people in Luzon also have spears with detachable heads. The Aeta remove the heads when entering Christian towns to trade (during which the shaft can still be used as a staff weapon) while the Igorot can use the detachable head as a dagger.

Traditionally, Philippine spears were not used with the "helicopter" twirling motions found in Chinese arts such as Wushu and Indian Silambam. According to FMA instructor and journalist Daniel Foronda who hails from the Mountain Province region, such twirling techniques cannot be used amongst dense pine trees, and basic utilization with the Igorot spear is more akin to rifle bayonet training.

== See also ==
- Sugob
- Sumpit
- Bagakay
