= Salem Assli =

French-American martial artist

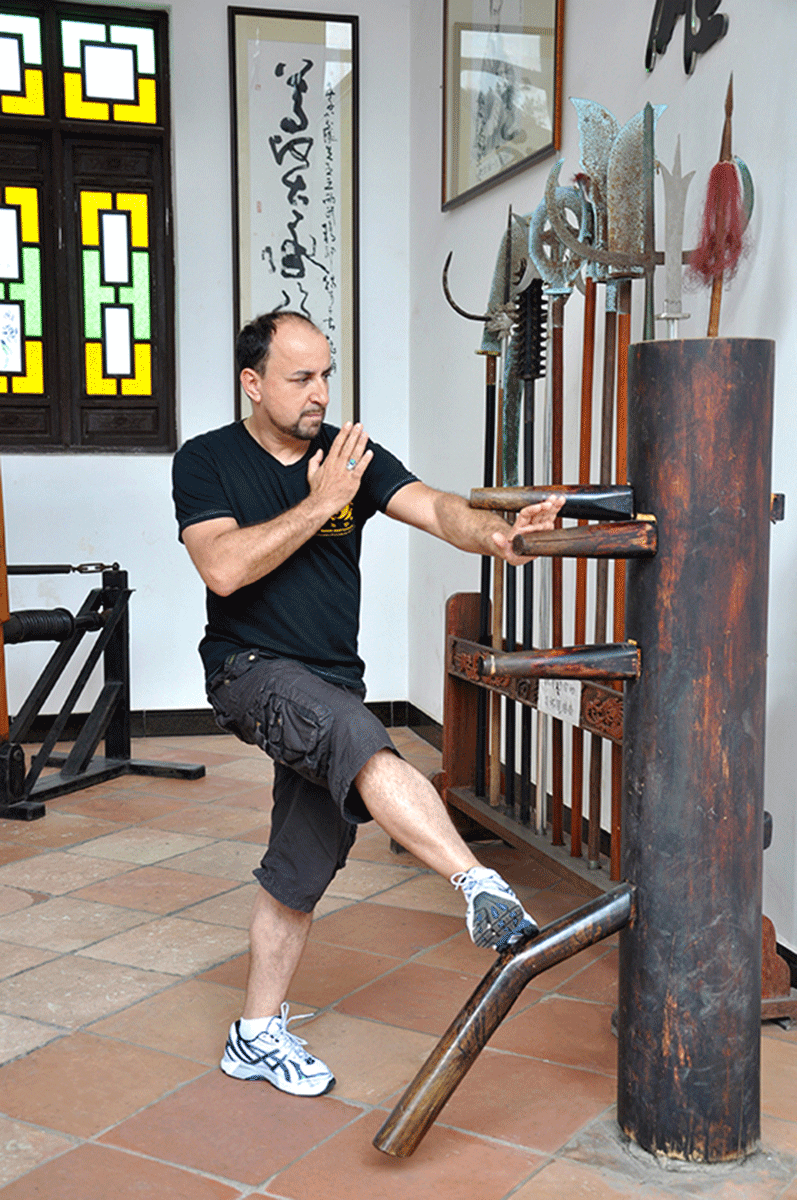
- Salem Assli at training
- Born: December 2, 1959; Lille, France
- Died: November 5, 2021 (aged 61); Los Angeles, CA
- Occupation: Martial arts Instructor
- Style: French Boxing Savate, Jeet Kune Do, Filipino Kali, Filipino martial arts, Maphilindo silat
- Spouse: Married to Shiyun Chen
- Website: salemassli.com

Signature
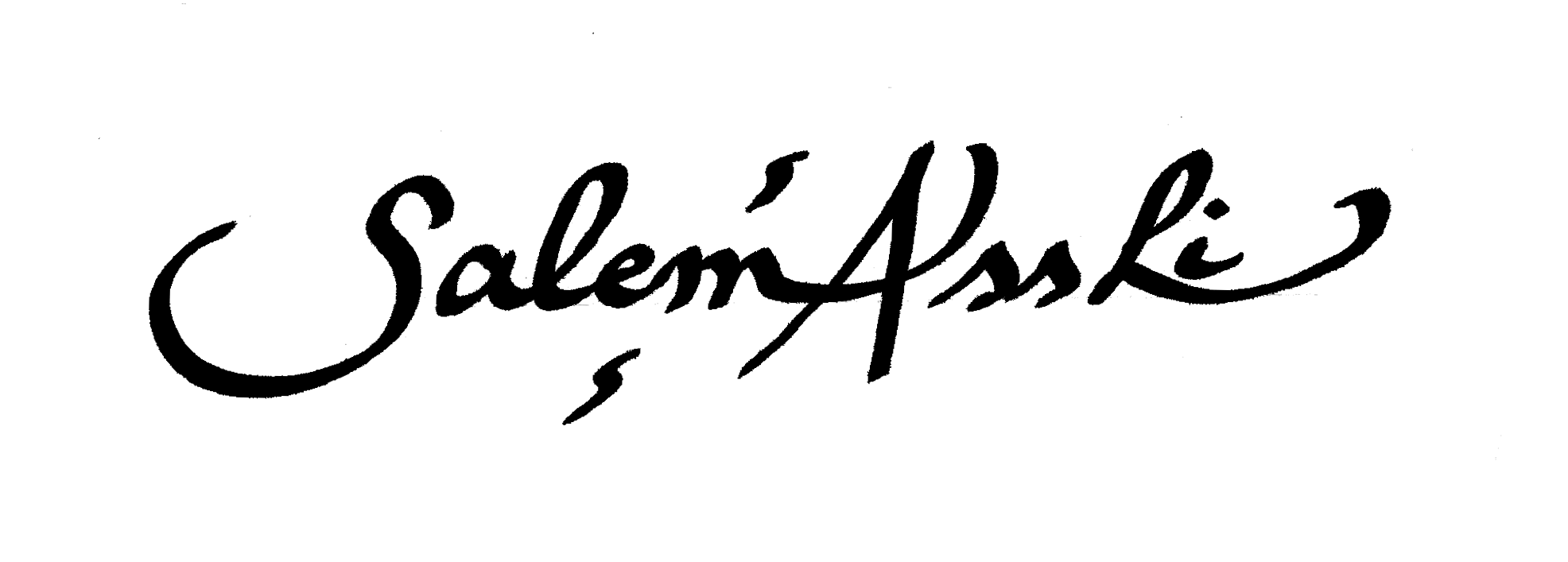

Salem Assli was a French-American martial artist, instructor, and researcher best known as the first B.F. Savate instructor in the US. He also continued the development of martial arts on five continents and was Head of the French association of Jeet Kune Do and Filipino Kali.

== Early life ==
He was born in a French-Belgian-Algerian family. His mother was from Northern France, her father was Belgian (Flemish), Salem's father was from North Africa, Algeria and came to France when he was 16, but to reside in France he had to state that he was two years older than he actually was. Assli's father used to work in a plastic manufacturing factory and his mother was a housewife taking care of four children.

== Career ==
Salem had been a martial arts practitioner since the 1970s, and his journey started with Bruce Lee's Jeet Kune Do. Prior to that, he competed as a gymnast under Dominique Lescornez at the "La Renaissance" club for 10 years until the age of 18. In 1983, while in his early 20s, he moved from France to the US (Los Angeles) at the invitation of Dan Inosanto, a student of Bruce Lee, to study directly under his tutelage. Salem was desperately trying to get a response from Dan Inosanto and when he almost gave up, he received a handwritten letter from Inosanto.

Salem Assli became a proficient coach in more than ten types of martial arts, and is acknowledged as the leading and first certified Savate instructor in North America.

He was a published writer and was featured in countless martial arts publications such as Black Belt magazine, Inside Kung Fu, Budo International, World of Martial Arts and Dragon Magazine among other publications and TV shows. As an author and researcher, he was interested in the history of edged weapons and archery and has a passion for archeology, cultural history and religious studies. Other figures that have influenced his values are Georges Brassens, Jean Ferrat, Jacques Brel, Bob Marley and Raël.

== Martial arts ==
Salem Assli was the first Frenchman to graduate and be certified as a Senior Full instructor in Jun Fan Gung Fu Jeet Kune Do and the Filipino martial arts under Dan Inosanto. In 1986 he received his first teaching certificates in both Jun Fan Jeet Kune Do and Filipino martial arts. Salem also studied Muay Thai under Ajarn Chai Sirisute (President of Thai Boxing Association in the USA) and earned his instructorship from the Thai Boxing Association of America. He then became the first Muay Thai instructor of the Inosanto International Instructors Association. Salem trained with the son of Bruce Lee, Brandon Lee at the Inosanto Academy. He was the Thai pads holder during Brandon's examination in Thai boxing. Salem also gave martial arts private lessons to Hollywood actor Fred Ward.

Dan Inosanto encouraged Salem to master the art of his homeland, Savate, so that he could teach it to the students of the Inosanto Academy and worldwide. His first step into the world of French Savate started with an old book that Inosanto lent him – Boxe Francaise History and Tradition by Bernard Plasait (Student of Count Pierre Baruzy), Golden Glove of French Boxing, two-time French champion. He continued researching Savate along his life, particularly traditional old-style Savate. Back in France Salem earned his 1st degree Silver Glove from France's National Technical Director, Bob Alix. Salem finished first in his class of 50 students, acquiring the highest grading, all without previously having an instructor or a teacher. One year later in Los Angeles, Salem earned the prestigious diploma of Professeur of Savate Boxe Francaise and his 2nd degree Silver Glove along with members of the French Elite Team such as Richard Sylla and Robert Paturel.

=== Disciplines ===
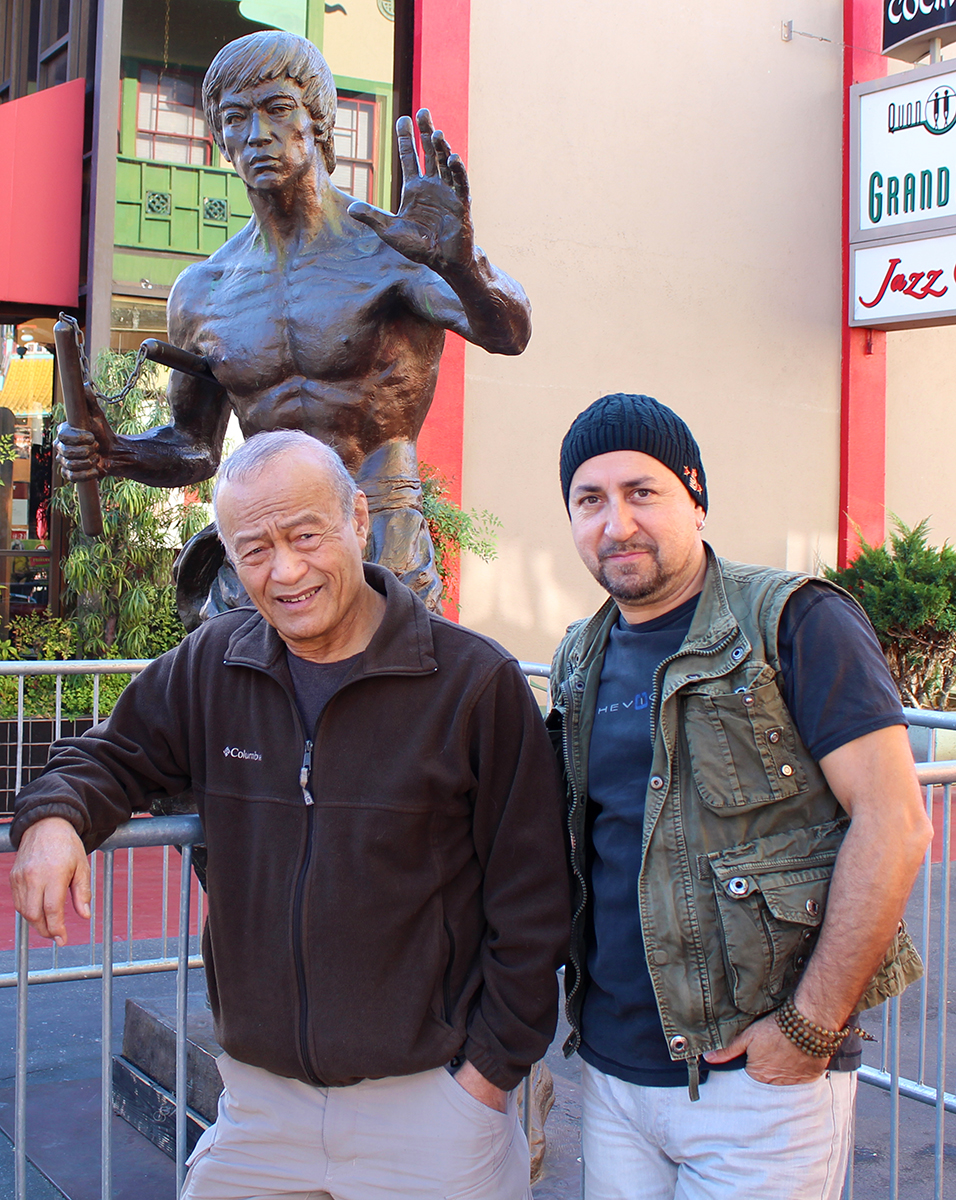
Guro Dan Inosanto and Salem Assli

- Lee Jun Fan Kick Boxing
- Jeet Kune Do (the Art and Philosophy of Bruce Lee)
- Filipino Martial Arts (Kali - Eskrima - Silat)
- Wing Chun Kung Fu
- Muay Thai Boxing
- Savate Boxe Française (French Foot Fighting)
- The Madjapahit Martial Arts
- Maphilindo Silat
- Shoot Wrestling
- Krabi Krabong (Thai swords and weapons training)
- Chinese Sword Play
- Parisien Fighting and Savate Defense
- French Cane Fighting and Bâton of combat
- Capoeira

=== Trained with ===
- Dan Inosanto
- Surachai Sirisute
- Bud Thompson
- “Leo” Miguel Giron
- Edgar Sulite
- Yori Nakamura
- Francis Fong
- Gene LeBell
- Wally Jay
- Jean Jacques Machado
- "Ted" Lucaylucay Jr.
- Brandon Lee

== Death ==
In March 2021, Assli got into a severe motorcycle accident in Los Angeles. He was hit by another vehicle while riding two blocks away from his home to get some breakfast. He was delivered to the emergency room at UCLA Medical Center with ten broken ribs, a cut tongue, a broken nose, a tooth in his lung, a bleeding kidney and liver, and a completely crushed leg bone. Salem went through several surgeries and doctors were able to save his leg and organs. Partially recovered from the accident and already at home, in September Assli was diagnosed with COVID-19 and immediately hospitalized. After 54 days of hospitalization, he could not resist the infection and died on the afternoon of November 5, 2021. He was survived by his wife Shiyun Chen and students in many countries.

== Publications ==
Books:

- French Savate. Salem Assli. 2000
- Jeet Kune Do (Jun Fan Gung Fu, Kick-boxing). Salem Assli 2001
- Jeet Kune Do. Dan Inosanto and Salem Assli. 2013

Salem was working on a 700-page book dedicated to Savate Boxe Française that he had been researching for 30 years. At the recommendation of a historian on French martial arts, Sylvain Salvini (former President of the International Savate Boxe Française Federation and a Golden Glove) Salem accumulated as many historical documents as possible about Savate. The book remains unfinished. Salem was still planning to write a book on Filipino martial arts.
