= Erwin Ballarta =

American police officer

Erwin Ballarta is the executive director of the Texas Police Association, a 501(c)(3) association founded in 1895 with the main purpose of promoting professionalism in law enforcement. Ballarta was previously the Executive Vice President of Capitol Strategic Operations He is a self-defense expert in Pekiti Tirsia Kali and various weapons. Ballarta has taught hand-to-hand combat and weapon tactics to the FBI, the Texas Highway patrol, and various military personnel and has been a bodyguard of George W. Bush and various celebrities. He was a Lieutenant with the Texas Department of Public Safety (DPS), where he was the Recruit School Coordinator and Defensive Tactics Coordinator for the Training Academy. He retired from the Texas D.P.S. at the end of August, 2008. He is also president of the Austin Filipino American Association and the executive director of the Texas Kali Association.

== Martial arts ==
Ballarta began his training in 1974 under Fred Tolentino in Manila in a family style of Arnis. In 1975, he met Leo T. Gaje Jr. and began training during frequent trips to New York City. In 1977, Ballarta fought in the first full contact Arnis tournament in the U.S., the Palarong Pilipino Pekiti-Tirsia tournament. Ballarta won first place as the first Filipino American full contact Arnis champion at the Philippine Embassy in New York City. During these early years of Pekiti-Tirsia in the U.S., he and Tom Bisio traded the champions' trophy back and forth each year at the tournament. Erwin's titles also include the 1980 Grand Champion (Great Gorge, New Jersey) and the 1981 U.S. Midwest Champion.

== Law enforcement ==
In 1982, Ballarta moved to Big Spring, Texas to continue his training with Gaje. He was Billy McGrath's roommate during that time, and also shared a house with Ronnie Bautista and Lee Bonvillain for a few months. Bautista is a former sheriff's deputy from Calcasieu Parish, Louisiana, and Bonvillain is a former police officer for the city of Lake Charles, Louisiana. Soon after arriving in Texas, Erwin became a police officer with the Big Spring Police Department. He was soon promoted to the rank of Sergeant of the Patrol Division, then Crime Prevention and finally Criminal Investigation Divisions.

From 1987 to the August, 2008, Ballarta was a State Trooper with the Texas Department of Public Safety (DPS) in positions that have included Staff Sergeant Governor's Protective Detail, Staff Sergeant DPS Training Academy, and rising to the position of Staff Lieutenant Defensive Tactics Coordinator at the DPS Training Academy. The Defensive Tactics Section offers instruction in legal use of force issues, custody death, baton tactics, OC Pepper Spray, empty hand self-defense, edge weapons defense, baton tactics, pressure points, survival ground tactics, handcuffing, and handgun retention.

Among his many certifications are Emergency medical technician certification and an Instructor's Certification with the Texas Commission on Law Enforcement Office of Standards and Education. He is an ASP Tactical Baton Instructor and a Chemical Aerosol Projector Instructor. In 2006, Ballarta received certification as an Arrest and Control Tactics Instructor at FLETC in Georgia.

== Instruction ==
Ballarta has taught the following subjects at specialized schools.

- Edged weapon Defense, Philippine National Police
- Defensive Tactics Instructors Course, FBI in Quantico, Virginia
- DEA Recruit School, (also at Quantico)
- DPS SWAT Team
- DPS Narcotics Agents
- DPS Criminal Law Enforcement Agents
- Improvised Survival Weaponry, Mexico Federal Police
- DPS Narcotics Agents (TNCP)
- Handgun retention
- DPS recruit schools
- DPS narcotics
- Officer survival schools
- DPS SWAT
- Baton Tactics
- DPS Recruit School
- Midland Sheriff's Office
- Women's Self Protection, Sul Ross University
- DPS employees, Big Spring, TX. Midland, TX.
- Oleoresin Capsicum spray (OC) training classes
- Survival Ground Tactics

He has been recognized by the FBI Training Academy, Quantico, VA. for his efforts and contribution in the field of Defensive Tactics and developed and instructed the Arnis Baton Tactics class for the Texas DPS Troopers Officer Survival Course (implemented statewide). Before joining the State Police Ballarta was the Head Instructor for Safety Baton Tactics, Permian Basin Law Enforcement Academy.

In 1997, Ballarta helped establish a formal agency alliance between the Philippine National Police and Texas DPS.

== Instructional controversy ==
In the A-2005 DPS Recruit School, Ballarta was the instructor during full-contact fighting training called "Active Countermeasures". During this fight, Trooper Trainee Jimmy Carty was fatally injured, dying 10 days later. According to sworn statements, Ballarta was informed of the mis-match in skills of Carty and his opponent, but refused to schedule a different opponent. Ballarta was also the referee during this match and had several opportunities to end the match when it was apparent that Carty was overwhelmed. Since this incident, the DPS had an outside consultant review the training program. After review, the program was modified to mirror the Arrest and Control Tactics of FLETC. The widow of Jimmy Carty has filed a "wrongful death" lawsuit against the DPS.

Case no. 11–40253, Christy Carty V. Texas Department of Public Safety, et al. has a final disposition filed with the 5th Circuit Court on March 14, 2012. Document: 00511788802 indicates the case was dropped. "For the reasons above, we REVERSE and RENDER in favor of Defendants on the remaining claim against them based on qualified immunity. We REMAND for further proceedings consistent with this opinion." 6 This court ruled that the district court abused its discretion in not addressing Defendants’ motion for Plaintiff to file a reply under Fed. R. Civ. P. 7(a) to Defendants’ answer raising the qualified immunity defense and instructed the district court to order Plaintiff to file such a reply."

== Personal security ==
Ballarta is also head of security for cyclist Lance Armstrong. Ballarta performed security duty for George W. Bush.
