= Rey Galang =

Filipino martial artist

Reynaldo S. "Rey" Galang is a Filipino martial arts teacher and author. He is one of the chief founders and head instructors of Bakbakan International.

== History and experience ==
Rey Galang was born in Manila. Losing his father at an early age, his uncles contributed greatly to his interest in the Martial Arts. His family had a history of career military and police officers.

He was a student of the late Antonio Ilustrisimo, and he is the official designated heir of the knife fighting aspect of Kalis Ilustrisimo (which he has developed into a present-day form called "Tulisan"). He holds ranks in the arts of karate, Jujutsu, judo and aikido.

== Notoriety ==
Along with Christopher "Topher" Ricketts, Rey Galang was the founder and driving force behind the Bakbakan organization or "Fraternal Brotherhood" of Filipino Martial Artists.

In 1986, Rey formed a project called "Masters of Arnis" which featured Rey Galang, Christopher Ricketts, Antonio Diego and Edgar Sulite on an instructional tour of Sydney and Melbourne, Australia.

This gave Rey and Bakbakan international exposure and triggered several articles in mainstream martial arts magazines. Since then, he has written four Martial Arts books and numerous magazine articles.

== Lameco influence ==
The late Punong-Guro Edgar Sulite sought Master Rey's support and advice in developing the final structure of the Lameco Eskrima organization.

Rey assisted with the setup of ranking structure and instructor certifications, and he designed and edited Lameco's newsletter "Vortex". Rey Galang is the second highest ranking (5th degree) Lameco instructor certified by Edgar Sulite. The highest ranking (with the exception of Edgar Sulite) is Christopher Ricketts.

== Publications ==
- Masters of the Blade ISBN 0-9727679-2-4
- Warrior Arts of the Philippines ISBN 0-9727679-1-6
- Classic Arnis ISBN 0-9727679-0-8
- Complete Sinawali: Filipino Double Weapon Fighting ISBN 0-8048-3156-4
