= José Caballero =

José Caballero may refer to:

- José Caballero (baseball), Panamanian professional baseball player
- José Caballero (painter), Spanish painter
- Jose Caballero (martial artist), Filipino martial arts practitioner
- José Luis Caballero, Mexican footballer
- José de la Luz y Caballero, Cuban academic
