= Hawak Ko Buhay Mo =

Philippine action film

- Directed by: Ronn Rick
- Screenplay by: Humilde "Meek" Roxas; Ronn Rick
- Story by: Ronn Rick
- Produced by: Eric Cuatico
- Starring: Ronnie Ricketts; Michael de Mesa
- Cinematography: Val Dauz
- Edited by: Francis Vinarao
- Music by: Jessie Lasaten
- Production company: Rocketts Productions
- Distributed by: Neo Films
- Release date: July 1996
- Running time: 120 minutes
- Country: Philippines
- Languages: Filipino; English

Hawak Ko Buhay Mo (transl. Your Life in My Hands) is a 1996 Philippine action film written and directed by Ronnie Ricketts under the name Ronn Rick. The film stars Ricketts and Michael de Mesa.

The film is streaming online on YouTube.

== Cast ==
- Ronnie Ricketts as Alex
- Michelle Aldana as Joana
- Michael de Mesa as Bakli Leeg
- Efren Reyes Jr. as Matt
- Jessa Zaragoza as Victim
- Rolly Quizon as Skillet
- Ernie Garcia as Victor
- Rez Cortez as Chief
- Edgar Mande as Matt's Policeman
- Jude Estrada
- Renzo Cruz as Dex
- Ben Sanchez as Bartender
- Nognog as Jeff
- Dinky Doo Jr. as Mack
- Jayke Joson as Alex's Policeman
- Mikey Arroyo as Alex's Policeman
- Alvin Anson as Alex's Asset
- Dong Serrano
- Onchie Dela Cruz
- Javier Vega
- Topher Ricketts as Alex's Policeman
- Elmo Rodrigo
- Jake Ricketts as Alex's Policeman
- Ver Rodriguez
- Paul Sanz
