= Lameco Eskrima =

Filipino martial art

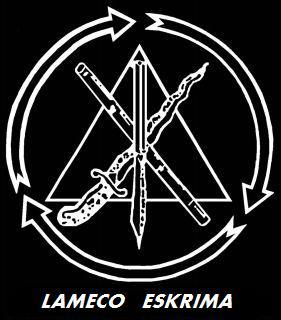
Lameco Sign

Lameco Eskrima is the system of Filipino martial arts founded by Edgar Sulite based on his training and experience with various Philippine Martial Arts masters, with heavy influence from Jose Caballero and Antonio Ilustrisimo.

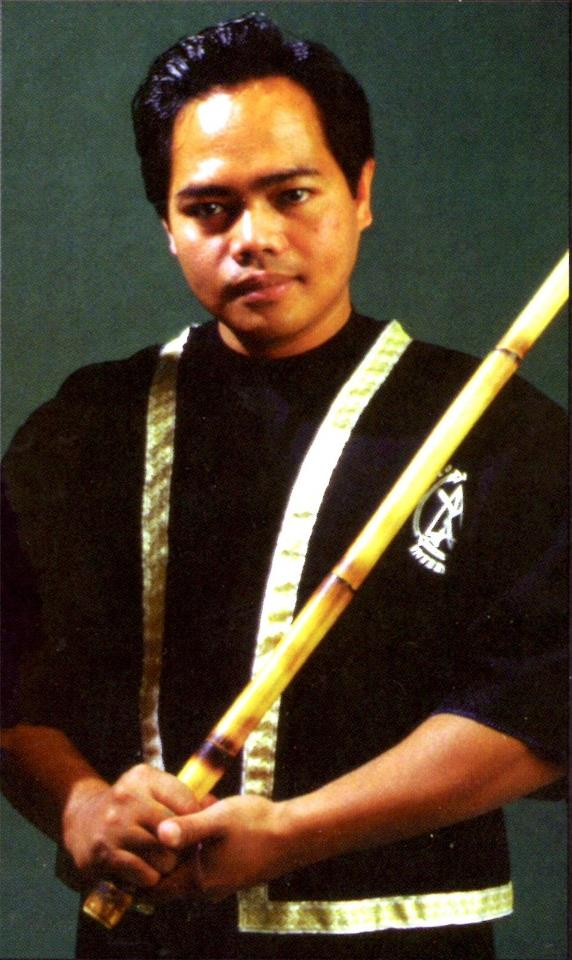
PG Sulite

The word Lameco is actually a combination of words which are the three basic ranges of combat involved in the study and practice of Lameco Eskrima - Largo, Medio and Corto (Long, Middle, and Close).

The LAMECO logo represents the following items.

| Symbol | Representation |
|---|---|
| Arrows | The Flow of Nature |
| Balisong Knife | Luzon – Northern Philippines |
| Eskrima Stick | Visayas – Central Philippines |
| Kris Sword | Mindanao – Southern Philippines |
| Triangle | The Integration of Mind, Body and Spirit |

== Lameco Eskrima Training ==
One of the characteristics of Filipino martial arts is the use of weapons from the very beginning of training. The primary weapon is a rattan stick, also called a cane or baston. These sticks vary in length from about 26 inches to as much as 38 inches in length or more. The weapons can vary in weight and thickness depending on the preference of the practitioner.

Lameco uses Double and single Stick, Double and single Dagger, Stick and Dagger, Sword, Staff, Handkerchief, and Empty Hands.

Lameco Eskrima is a synthesis of five major systems of Eskrima:

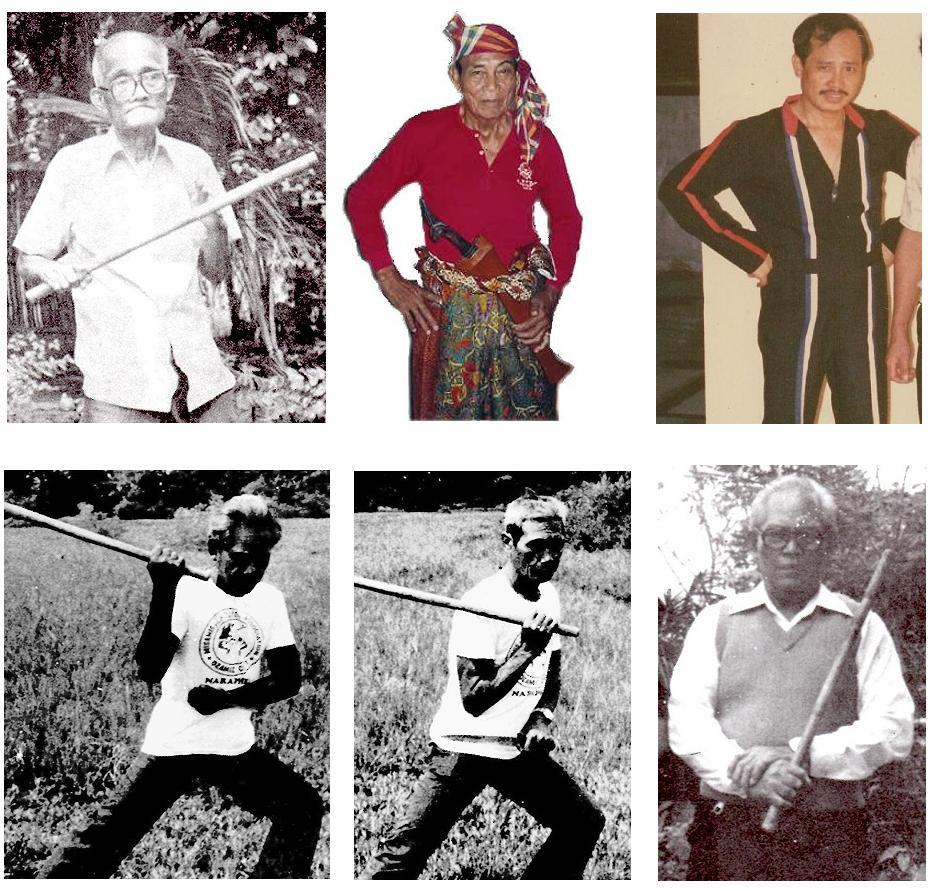
Major Systems

- De Campo Uno-Dos-Tres Orihinal (GM Jose Caballero)
- Kali Illustrisimo (GM Antonio Ilustrisimo)
- Kali Pekiti-Tirsia (Tuhon Leo Tortal Gaje Jr.)
- Modernos Largos (GM Jesus Abella & GM Pablicito “Pabling” Cabahug)
- Sulite Rapelon (GM Helacrio Sulite Sr.)

Six minor systems of Eskrima:

- Doce Pares (GM Diony Canete)
- Balintawak (GM Johnny Chiuten)
- Lapunti Arnis De Abanico (GM Felimon E. Caburnay)
- Siete Teros Serado - Serado no Puede Entra (GM Marcilino Ancheta)
- Abanico De Sungkiti (GM Billy Baaclo)
- Tres Personas Eskrima De Combate (GM Maj. Timoteo E. Maranga)

Uncredited Influences on the Lameco Eskrima System:

- Moro-Moro System (Master Andrew Abrian)
- Simaron Style (GM Abdul Hai Qahar Madueño)

Lameco employs training drills called Laban Laro (Play Fighting). Laban Laro allows the eskrimador to come as close to real combat as possible without injury. It is also designed to get an uncountable number of repetitions in a short period of time.

Edgar devised a unique armor for the hands and forearms.

Lameco striking system is largely based on striking employed in Caballero system with a few modifications. Striking system consists of twelve strikes in a pattern that facilitates the flow between strikes

1. Forehand to the temple
2. Backhand to the knee
3. Forehand to the knee
4. Backhand to the temple
5. Thrust to the stomach (with pull-through across the chest)
6. Backhand to the elbow
7. Forehand to the elbow
8. Backhand thrust to the chest
9. Backhand to the collar bone
10. Forehand thrust to the chest
11. Forehand to the collar bone
12. Vertical down to the crown

== History ==
At a young age Edgar Sulite's father who was a boxer and Arnisador, exposed him to the Filipino Martial Arts. Growing up in the Barrios of the Philippines, Edgar witnessed many skirmishes settled blade against blade.

Edgar trained with martial arts masters who included Leo Gaje of Pekiti-Tirsia, Jose Caballero of De Campo Uno-Dos-Tres Orehenal, Jesus Abella of Modern Largos, Antonio Ilustrisimo of Kali Illustrisimo and many others.

In 1981, he moved to Manila to train under Grandmaster Antonio Ilustrisimo. After relocating to the United States on June 30, 1989, he became instructor to Dan Inosanto and Larry Hartsell.

Recognizing the talent and knowledge that Edgar possessed, Dan Inosanto would become a student and an advocate of the Lameco system.

Punong Guro Edgar Sulites wife Felisia Sulite appointed Leonard Trigg as president and Dan Inosanto as Vice President of Lameco Eskrima International quite a few years after Punong Guros death.

== Ranking ==
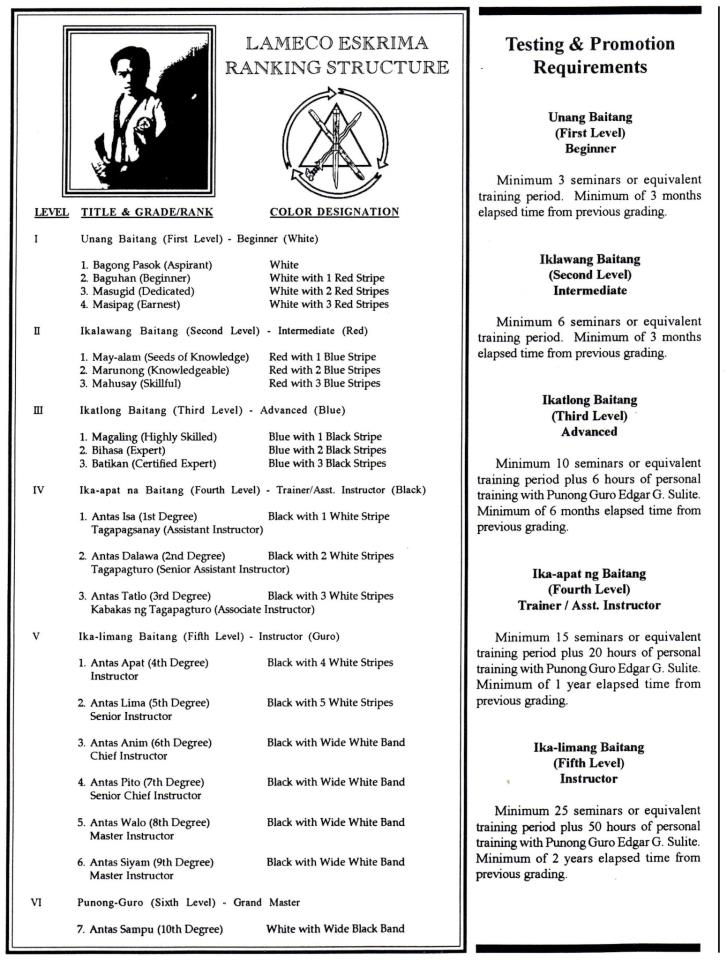
Lameco Ranking

Unang Baitang (First Level) - Beginner (White)

1. Bagong Pasok (Aspirant) - white

2. Baguhan (Beginner) - White with 1 red stripe

3. Masugid (Dedicated) - White with 2 red stripes

4. Masipag (Earnest) - White with 3 red stripes

Ikalawang Baitang (Second Level) - Intermediate (Red)

1. May-alam (Seeds of Knowledge) - Red with 1 blue stripe

2. Marunong (Knowledgeable) - Red with 2 blue stripes

3. Mahusay (Skillful) - Red with 3 blue stripes

Ikationg Baitang (Third Level) - Advanced (Blue)

1. Magaling (Highly Skilled) - Blue with 1 black stripe

2. Bihasa (Expert) - Blue with 2 black stripes

3. Batikan (Certified Expert) - Blue with 3 black stripes

Ika-apat na Baitang (Fourth Level) - Trainer/Asst. Instructor (Black)

1. Antas Isa (1st Degree) - Black with 1 white stripe

Tagapagsanay (Assistant Instructor)

2. Antas Dalawa (2nd Degree) - Black with 2 white stripes

Tagapagturo (Senior Assistant Instructor)

3. Antas Tatlo (3rd Degree) - Black with 3 white stripes

Kabakas ng Tagapagturo (Associate Instructor)

Ika-limang Baitang (Fifth Level) - Instructor (Guro)

1. Antas Apat (4th Degree) instructor - Black with 4 white stripes

2· Antas Lima (5th Degree) Senior Instructor - Black with 5 white stripes

3. Antas Ardm (6th Degree) Chief Instructor - Black with wide white band

4. Antas Pito (7th Degree) Senior Chief Instructor - Black with wide white band

5. Antas Walo (8th Degree) Master Instructor - Black with wide white band

6. Antas Slyam (9th Degree) Master Instructor - Black with wide white band

Punong-Guro (Sixth Level)

7. Antas Sampu (10th Degree) - Black with wide black band

Current practitioners of Lameco Eskrima who head their own organization or group or are otherwise prominent include: Dan Inosanto, Larry Hartsell, Ron Balicki, the Dog Brothers, Erik Manuevo, Lameco SOG aka the Sulite Backyard Group and Bakbakan International.

Prominent members heading their own organization, schools or group teaching Original Lameco Eskrima unchanged from what Punong Guro Edgar Sulite was teaching include: David Gould/USA, Dino Flores/USA and Wolfgang Mueller/Germany.

== See also ==
- Arnis
- Filipino Martial Arts
- Eskrimadors

== External resources ==
- "Lameco Eskrima International"
- "Bakbakan International"
- "The Dog Brothers"
- Philippines Cultural Research Org - mandirigma.org
- Lameco Eskrima in Stockholm, Sweden
