= Filmocan San Miguel Eskrima International =

- Abbreviation: FSMEI
- Founder: Momoy Cañete
- Headquarters: Cebu City, Philippines

Filmocan San Miguel Eskrima International (FSMEI) is a Filipino martial arts organization based in Cebu City, Philippines. It is founded in 1996 by Panto Cañete Flores in honor of his grandfather, Filemon “Momoy” Cañete who developed the San Miguel Eskrima system.

San Miguel Eskrima is characterized by its integration of long-range, mid-range, and close-quarters combat techniques, making it a versatile system applicable to various self-defense scenarios. Momoy Cañete named the system in honor of San Miguel (St. Michael the Archangel) revered in Christian tradition as a divine warrior and protector.

== Origins ==
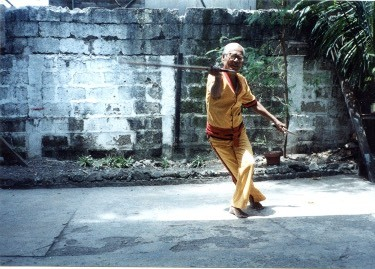
Momoy Cañete performing San Miguel Eskrima

Momoy drew inspiration from the biblical story of the War in Heaven, where St. Michael led the heavenly forces against Lucifer. This spiritual symbolism is reflected in the system’s signature diagonal strike, known as the “San Miguel strike,” which refers to a forehand diagonal motion with the right hand, moving from the right shoulder to the left hip. The strike is named after Saint Michael, who is traditionally depicted holding a sword at this angle.

The San Miguel Eskrima Multi-Style System is rooted in a traditional blade-oriented approach to combat, reflecting the authentic methods of Filipino martial arts practiced in earlier generations.

== Biography of Filemon “Momoy” dela Cuesta Cañete ==
=== Early Life and Background ===
Filemon dela Cuesta Cañete, known as “Momoy,” was born on November 22, 1904, in Cabatbatan, a barangay of San Fernando, Cebu. He learned the basics of self-defense from his father, Gregorio, during his childhood.

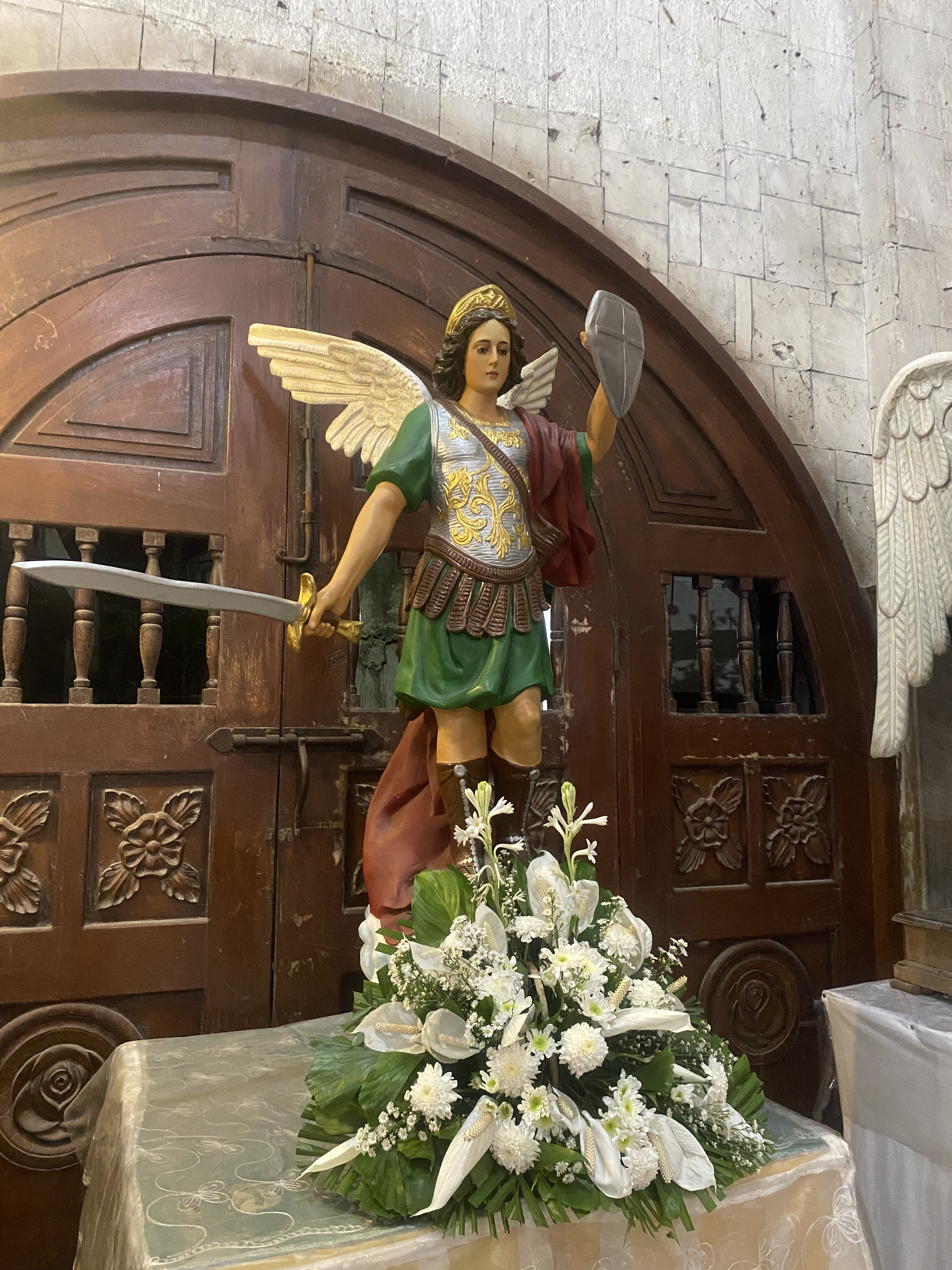
A photo of St. Michael the Archangel

During local festival celebrations, the barangay's patron saint, San Miguel, was carried in a procession around the neighborhood. Momoy participated in religious observances honoring the patron saint San Miguel, including kneeling and making the sign of the cross during the procession.

He pursued continued study in self-defense techniques throughout his life, leading him to study under respected Eskrimador of their era, Lt. Pinyete Aranas, as well as other notable teachers such as Juan Tecson and Juaso Tekya.

=== The Birth of San Miguel Eskrima ===
In 1920, Lorenzo Saavedra and his son Teodoro were recognized as two of the most prominent eskrimadors in Cebu. Momoy studied the art of fencing under both men, further developing his skills in Filipino martial arts. In 1926, the Saavedras established the Labangon Fencing Club, where the Cañete family were active members for several years until the club eventually dissolved.

In 1932, the Cañetes and the Saavedras co-founded the Doce Pares Club. The name Doce Pares, meaning “Twelve Pairs [of hands],” was derived from the legendary group of warriors in France during the reign of Charlemagne, elite warriors in medieval France reputed for their swordsmanship and bravery.

Momoy later developed and formalized his own system, which he named San Miguel Eskrima, in honor of the patron saint of his barangay.

=== Legacy ===
Momoy Cañete taught San Miguel Eskrima at his residence on C. Padilla Street in San Nicolas, Cebu. He trained the system to his students, including his grandson, Panto Cañete Flores. Momoy’s system of San Miguel Eskrima continues to be practiced and taught internationally.

== Organizational Development ==
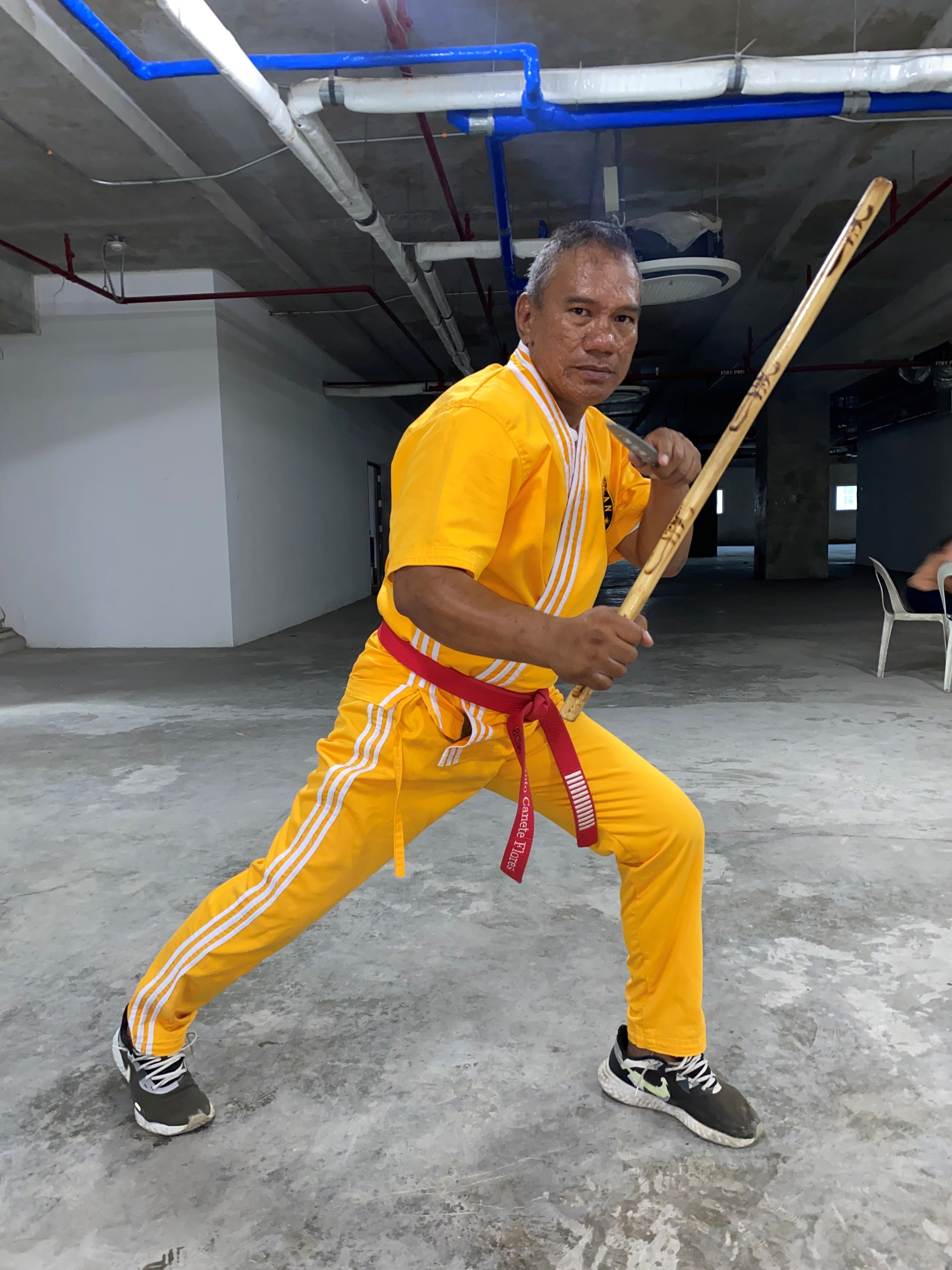
Panto Flores in Kimono

Momoy Cañete taught San Miguel Eskrima at his residence on C. Padilla Street in San Nicolas, Cebu. He trained the system to his students, including his grandson, Panto Cañete Flores.

After Momoy’s death at age 91, Panto Cañete Flores continued teaching and refining the San Miguel Eskrima system following his grandfather’s passing. In 1996, he established Filmocan, named after Filemon Momoy Cañete. The organization began with four students and has since expanded to include instruction in schools and universities.

== See also ==
- Arnis
- San Miguel Eskrima
