= Sugob =

Throwing spear used by Filipino natives

Sugob, also spelled sugub, is a type of javelin used in the pre-colonial Philippines. They are made from sharpened bagakay (Schizostachyum lumampao) bamboo in which certain compartments were filled with sand to add weight for throwing. They sometimes had wooden tips laced with snake venom.

Sugob are easy to manufacture and are meant to be disposable. They are often carried in large numbers by karakoa warships and thrown at enemy ships during naval warfare. In contrast to the metal-tipped sibat spears which are often finely crafted and are only thrown as a last resort.

== See also ==
- Bagakay
- Sibat
- Sumpit
