= Bagakay =

Filipino projectile weapon

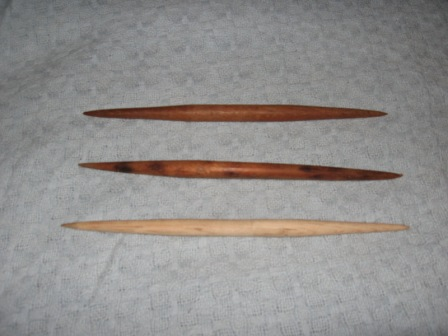
- Type: Projectile Dart, Spear
- Place of origin: Philippines

Service history
- Used by: Filipinos
- Wars: Spanish colonization of the Philippines

Specifications
- Length: 6–10 inches

The bagakay is an ancient Filipino weapon made of bamboo or wood. It is a dart-type of weapon sharpened at both ends and about six to ten inches in length thrown at an enemy at close quarters and were generally thrown five at a time increasing the possibility of hitting the target. It can be made from small tree branches cut in the proper length and sharpened at both ends or made from hollow bamboo filled with clay for additional weight and easy throwing. It is named after Schizostachyum lima, a species of bamboo locally known as bagakay.

== History ==
The bagakay was usually used to hunt birds before the Spanish Colonial period. It has evolved into a projectile weapon against the Spanish colonists during the colonization era.

== Description ==
Bagakay is largely short-range but could effectively puncture thick objects. It differs from the sugob, a similar disposable bamboo javelin weighted with sand, used for longer distances. It is not used like a javelin or spear but thrown overhand or underhand and made to spin in order to hit the target.

Bagakay may also connote a long bamboo spear. An account also cited a variation of the weapon that is made of steel.

In some parts of the Philippines, bagakay is said to be used by sorcerers and folk healers to "inflict pain" to their victims. In a ritual, the sorcerer uses bagakay to puncture a doll fashioned from wax. The victim is then thought to suffer the pain in the part of his body corresponding to the portion of the wax doll stuck with bagakay.

A different weapon that uses the bamboo bagakay is called balatik. It is long pointed pole that can be launched by a drawn bough of springy wood and was often used to hunt wild pigs.

== See also ==
- Sugob
- Sibat
- Sumpit
