= Bakbakan International =

Martial arts association in the Philippines

Bakbakan International is a martial arts association headquartered in Manila, Philippines and founded by Christopher Ricketts. It has chapters in Australia, Canada, and the United States. It also promoted the Masters of Arnis tour in Australia that featured Christopher Ricketts, Antonio Diego, Edgar Sulite, and Rey Galang.

The school teaches the following methods:

- Kali Ilustrisimo, which was developed by Antonio "Tatang" Ilustrisimo.
- The Tulisan Knife-Fighting System, which works as an offshoot of Kali Ilustrisimo and is based on technique rather than drill.
- The Sinawali Fighting System, which emphasizes ambidexterity and weapon mastery.
- Lameco Eskrima, developed by Edgar Sulite.
- The Sagasa Kickboxing System, which develops coordination, power, and reflexes.
- The Hagibis Combat System of close-quarter combat, which primarily emphasizes grappling, throwing, and tripping as means of disabling individual opponents where multiple opponents exist.
- Ngo Cho Kun (Wuzuquan) Kung Fu, which emphasizes power, stamina, and concentration.

Its notable members are Tony Diego, Edgar Sulite, Alexander Co, Christopher Ricketts, Rey Galang, Dodong Sta. Iglesia, Miguel Zubiri, Bruce "cousins" Pimentel, Doran Sordo, Ding Binay, Ronnie Ricketts, Rolly Maximo, Ramon Tulfo, Rey Dizer, Edgar Aristorenas, and Leonard A. Anderson. The organization or its senior members have been featured in or written the following published works:

- September 1997 issue of Exotic Martial Arts of Southeast Asia
- Filipino Martial Culture by Mark V. Wiley
- Five Ancestor Fist Kung Fu by Alexander Co
- Premiere Issue of Martial Arts Illustrated.
- Masters of the Blade by Reynaldo S. Galang
- Warrior Arts of the Philippines by Reynaldo S. Galang
- Classic ARNIS - The Legacy of Placido Yambao by Reynaldo S. Galang
- Complete Sinawali Filipino Double Weapon Fighting by Reynaldo S. Galang
