= Christopher Ricketts =

Filipino martial artist, actor and author

Christopher Naldo Ricketts (also "Topher" Ricketts; March 21, 1955–October 5, 2010) was a well-known Filipino martial arts innovator, teacher, actor and author. He was also one of the chief founders and head instructors of Bakbakan International and the eldest brother of the action star Ronnie Ricketts.

== History and experience ==
Christopher Ricketts was a well-known martial artist in the Philippines, Australia, and the United States. "Topher", as he was called by his peers, was an experienced tournament (both full-contact and point system) and street fighter. He was known for his strict emphasis on using basics and frequent contact sparring. Topher had trained champions, many of whom have become part of Philippine teams in Asian and international competitions. Apart from being Chief Instructor for Bakbakan, Topher had assisted his brother Ronnie Ricketts, a Philippine action star, in choreographing action scenes in many movies. He also acted in a few of them in supporting roles. Numerous Bakbakan members have played cameo roles in Ronnie's movies, lending credibility to the action sequences as well as drawing crowds to the theater's use of the authentic fight scenes.

== Personal life ==
Christopher "Topher" Ricketts was born and raised in Manila, Philippines. He married Ma. Elizabeth Mercado and had three sons Bruce Edward, Brandon Max and Christopher Joseph. "Topher" and his family relocated and moved to San Diego, California, around 2005.

== Notoriety ==
Along with Rey Galang, Christopher "Topher" Ricketts was a founder and a major contributor behind the Bakbakan organization. He gained exposure in 1986 from a project called "Masters of Arnis", which also featured Rey Galang, Antonio Diego and Edgar Sulite. They toured Sydney and Melbourne, Australia, giving seminars on the Filipino Martial Arts, particularly those taught as the Bakbakan curriculum. This international exposure for Bakbakan triggered several articles in mainstream martial arts magazines. Since then, he had collaborated with Antonio Diego on a book about the art of one of his primary teachers, Antonio "Tatang" Ilustrisimo.

== Death ==
He succumbed to cancer in San Diego, California, on October 5, 2010, at the age of 55.

== Filmography ==
=== Film ===
Year	Title	Role	Note(s)	Ref(s).
1997	Hawak Ko Buhay Mo	Alex's policeman		
2001	Mano Mano 2	Trainer		
2005	Uno			

== Publications ==
- The Secrets of Kalis Ilustrisimo by Christopher Ricketts and Antonio Diego ISBN 0-8048-3145-9
