= Black Scorpion Arnis =

Black Scorpion Arnis is a distinct Filipino martial art first developed in the late 1960s that focuses on self-defense. The hands and feet are used extensively in most of the styles moves.

== Etymology ==
The black scorpion or alakdan in Tagalog is a dangerous and poisonous animal that can kill anyone with its sting. The arnis or tungkod baston in Tagalog, is a cane or stick that is used in martial arts practice. Elderly men and women use this weapon as a walking stick for balance and self-defense.

== History ==
The Black Scorpion Arnis International (BSAI) is a self-defense and martial arts organization founded by Capt. Arthur Cuadrante Teodosio, who was a reserve officer of the Philippine Army and the United States Army volunteer reserve. Capt. Teodosio organized and founded Black Scorpion Arnis International in his hometown of Balete, Aklan, Philippines in 1969, and was formalized and registered with the Securities and Exchange Commission and Department of Trade and Industry on November 10, 1982.

Black Scorpion Arnis is a combination of martial art styles. Its development focuses on the field of self-defense and sports competition. The ultimate goal of this association is to introduce the sport locally and internationally for self-defense and competitions. BSAI has been conducting sports competitions, instructor seminars and national and international competitions since 1969. They have promoted thousands of students including experienced tournament players and black-belt holders under the leadership.

== Fighting Style ==
Black Scorpion Arnis uses hands and feet to earn a point in competition. Arnis, or stick fighting, is a Philippine martial art sport, and is also known as Kali, Escrima, or Arnis de Mano. Kali is the oldest known Filipino martial art of stick fighting.

The signature scorpion kick of the style is executed by pivoting to the back in a complete turn; much like a spinning hook kick or a reverse round house in other martial arts styles, the kick targets the side or back of the head while the practitioner is in mid to punching range. The degree of effectiveness falls under two classifications: panghilo ("paralyzing blow") and pamatay ("lethal kick"). The first is aimed at less vital parts of the physique, while the target of the second includes the heart, neck, head, groin, and spine.

== Sport ==
Black Scorpion Arnis utilizes the feet and hands during competition and practice.
