= Leo Gaje =

Filipino martial artist (1938–2026)

- Born: Leopoldo Tortal Gaje, Jr. 5 May 1938; Commonwealth of the Philippines
- Died: 25 September 2026 (aged 88)
- Style: Filipino martial arts Pekiti-Tirsia Kali

Other information
- Notable relatives: Conrado Tortal (grandfather)

Leo Gaje (5 May 1938 – 25 September 2026) was a Filipino martial artist and the grandson and heir to Conrado B. Tortal and the head of the Pekiti-Tirsia Kali System.

== Life and career ==
Gaje was born in the Philippines on 5 May 1938. Starting at the age of six, he was taught Pekiti-Tirsia, by his grandfather Conrado Tortal, a system founded by the Tortal family in 1897. In 1972 he moved to the United States and shortly after began to teach his family martial art fighting system. Up to that point, it was a fighting system that had never been taught outside of the Philippines.

He taught his art of Pekiti Tirsia to students of martial arts, personal security, law enforcement and militaries worldwide. He has been featured on the covers of several top martial arts magazines. He was a member of the Martial Arts Hall of Fame and the Karate Hall of Fame.

Gaje trained notable martial artists such as Dan Inosanto, Eddie Jafri, Tom Bisio, Erwin Ballarta, Manuel Taningco, William McGrath, Philip Gelinas, and Greg Alland. Inosanto said about Pekiti-Tirsia Kali, "In the field of strategic knife defense, the Pekiti-Tirsia System of Kali is one of the most progressive, practical and sophisticated systems of tactical knife self-defense and edged weapon awareness that I have encountered."

Gaje died on 25 September 2026, at the age of 88.
