= Ciriaco Cañete =

Filipino martial artist

- Born: August 8, 1919; San Fernando, Cebu, Philippine Islands
- Died: February 5, 2016 (aged 96); Cebu City, Philippines
- Style: Doce Pares, Eskrido
- Rank: 12th Degree Black Belt in Cacoy Doce Pares; 12th Degree Black Belt in Eskrido; 10th Dan Black Belt in Pangamot; 8th Degree Black Belt in Judo; 8th Degree Black Belt in Ju-Jitsu; 6th Degree Black Belt in Aikido; 6th Degree Black Belt in Shorin-ryu Karate

Ciriaco "Cacoy" Cañete (August 8, 1919 – February 5, 2016) was a Filipino martial artist of the Doce Pares Eskrima Club. He was the last surviving member of the club, which was founded in January 1932. He was also a 12th degree black belt. His version of the Doce Pares Eskrima system is known as Cacoy Doce Pares. In 1951 he developed a personal system of his named Eskrido.

== Biography ==
Born in San Fernando, Cebu, in the Visayas region of the Philippines, Cañete was the youngest of twelve children. The martial art Eskrima was a tradition in his family, and he began training at age seven under his brother Filemon "Momoy" Cañete. Filemon had learned it from his father, Gregorio, and uncles Gavino, Pedro, and Juancho. Ciriaco Cañete was also trained in other martial arts, including ju-jitsu, boxing, judo, free style wrestling, Shorin-ryu karate, and aikido. Ciriaco "Cacoy" Canete is famous for fighting over 100 no-rules eskrima matches. He was the preeminent Doces Pares warrior.

Amid high interest in Filipino martial arts, Visayan martial arts practitioners formed the Doce Pares association in Cebu. In 1939, Cañete's elder brother Eulogio "Yoling" Cañete became president of Doce Pares. The organization became the longest-lasting martial arts organization in the Philippines, and was instrumental in popularizing the Filipino martial arts. Eulogio Cañete was president of Doce Pares until his death in 1988. Ciriaco Cañete served with the U.S. Army Forces Far East (USAFFE) during World War II; during the Japanese occupation, Ciriaco Cañete served as 2nd Lieutenant Combat Intelligence Officer, Cebu area (guerilla forces). In 1945, he was transferred to the 38th Military Police Company, where he served as Chief Instructor in Defense Tactics and trained the 38th & 39th MP companies stationed in Dumanjug, Cebu; after training was completed, Ciriaco Cañete was Military Police Detachment Commander and was stationed in Balamban and Tuburan, Cebu until his discharge in 1947. He studied at the University of Southern Philippines and taught martial arts in various Cebu schools.

In 1947 the Doce Pares club reorganized. Ciriaco "Cacoy" Cañete was senior single Olisi (stick) instructor, at the Doce Pares club. He also taught pangamot (empty hand versus weapons). The single stick is a training weapon used to represent a short sword, machete (bolo, pinute) or knife. During this time Cacoy Cañete revolutionized the use of the stick, incorporating traditional linear strikes (corto orihinal) with hooking strikes, butts, thrusts and developing a system of curving and circular strikes (corto kurbada); the strikes were used in conjunction with traps, locks, throws and disarms. Cañete began incorporating concepts of pangamot, ju jitsu and judo into his system as early as 1948; later incorporating aikido into his combat system. "Eskrido" or 'way of eskrima" was the name Cacoy Cañete gave to this revolutionary system of single stick combat.

By 1952, Cacoy Cañete was the chief instructor in single olisi, pangamut (empty hand techniques) and eskrido; his brother Filemon remained the senior instructor in espada y daga or olisi y daga.

Cacoy Cañete was instrumental in popularizing eskrima in the Philippines. During the 1970s, he met with other members of the Cebu Eskrima Society and spearheaded the movement to create a unified regional and national tournaments with sport rules, to popularize art of eskrima. Up until this time, eskrima matches had been fought with no rules and no protective gear; eskrima skills were to protect oneself from multiple armed attackers.

In 1979, at the age of sixty, he was champion of the First Open Arnis Tournament in Cebu City and the First National Invitational Arnis Tournament in Manila; both of which were sponsored by the National Arnis Association of the Philippines (NARAPHIL) and organized by Cañete's nephew and former student, Dionisio, who served as president of NARAPHIL and the World Eskrima-Kali Arnis Federation (WEKAF), an organization founded in 1987. Cañete acted in the 1979 Filipino film Arnis: The Stick of Death (he played himself).

In 1988, after the death of his elder brother and the club's founder Euloigio Cañete, Ciriaco "Cacoy" Cañete was elected President of the Doce Pares club, a position he continued to hold until his death.

He was diagnosed to have Prostate Cancer in 2008 and underwent a successful surgery, but it returned several years later.

He was already ill when he was admitted to the Chong Hua Hospital in Downtown Cebu sometime in late January 2016. He died on the night of February 5, 2016. He was 96.

== Honors ==
- 1979: March, Presidential Champion Trophy, 1st National Arnis Masters Open in Manila, Philippines
- 1979: August, Champion, 1st National Arnis Invitational in Manila, Philippines
- 1997: Inducted into Cebu City Sports Commission, Hall of Fame
- 1999: Appointed Sports Commissioner for Eskrima, Eskrido and Pangamot, by Mayor A. Garcia, Cebu City
- 2000: January, chosen as one of the "Most Outstanding Cebuanos of the Century" by the Cebuano Studies and Historical Association
- 2000: February, picked by the Cebu Historical Center as one of the "Four Outstanding Individual of Cebu City"
- 2000: July, Filipino Martial Arts Hall of Fame in El Paso, Texas, USA
- 2000: December, Blackbelt Hall of Fame ("Weapons Instructor of the Year") in Los Angeles, California, USA
- 2003: July, US Martial Arts Association Hall of Fame ("Most Distinguished Grandmaster of the Year") in St. Louis, Missouri
- 2003: July, World Martial Arts Hall of Fame in Columbus, Ohio
- 2004: July, US Martial Arts Association Hall of Fame ("Philippine Martial Arts Legend") in St. Louis, Missouri
- 2005: February, Mayor Tomas Osmeña's Special Awardee, Cebu City, Philippines
- 2005: June, World Martial Arts Masters Association Hall of Fame in Los Angeles, CA
- 2006: October, Martial Arts History of Museum Hall of Fame in Los Angeles, CA
- 2006: November, Cebu Eskrima Society Hall of Fame in Cebu City, Philippines
- 2008: March, Doce Pares Hall of Fame ("Doce Pares Legend") in Cebu City, Philippines
- 2008: May, International Martial Arts Times Magazine Hall of Fame ("Supreme GM of the Year") in Pakistan

== Authored books ==
- 1988: Basic Doce Pares Eskrima
- 2002: Pangamot (Bare-handed Defense System)
- 2004: Eskrido (Eskrima, Jujitsu & Judo Integrated)
- 2009: Eskrima-Arnis Techniques
- 2014: Olisi-Baraw

== Sources ==
- Filipino Fighting Arts: Theory and Practice by Mark V. Wiley, ISBN 0-86568-180-5
- Filipino Martial Culture by Mark V. Wiley, ISBN 0-8048-2088-0
- The Fastest Olisi Fighter by Atty. Jun Cañizares
