= Florendo M. Visitacion =

Florendo Malcruz Visitacion (11 June 1910 – 4 January 1999), Philippines is also known as Professor Vee, a martial arts instructor. He studied many diverse martial arts: Japanese, Chinese, Filipino, western, etc.

As his personal style evolved, so did its name, at one point he renamed it Vee Jitsu, Vee Jitsu Te, Visitacion-Ryu Jiujitsu and the final art he presented for recognition among his peers was Visitacion Kuntao-Arnis.
