= Chai Sirisute =

Thai martial arts instructor

- Born: October 16, 1948 (age 78)
- Other names: "Ajarn Chai"
- Nationality: Thai
- Style: Muay Thai
- Stance: Orthodox
- Team: WTBA

Other information
- Occupation: Muay Thai Coach

Surachai Sirisute (Thai: สุรชัย ศิริสูตร์, born October 16, 1948), commonly known as Chai Sirisute or Ajarn Chai, is a Thai martial arts instructor who is the founder and president of the Thai Boxing Association of the US and responsible for introducing Muay Thai to the United States. Born in Bangkok, Thailand, Sirisute started training Muay Thai at the age of 4.

== Biography ==
He formally studied both Muay Thai as well as karate beginning at the age of six. He earned his black belt in Shorin-ryu at the age of 12, an age at which he also started to fight in the ring in Muay Thai. Sirisute's original teacher was Ajarn Suwan out of Singpravaeh Muay Thai Gym (หัวใจเสือ). He left Thailand to teach in America in 1968.

During the 1970s and early 1980s Sirisute taught at several Southern California colleges: Chaffey College, Claremont Men's College and Cal State San Bernardino and out of his home. His early students included Jim Vanover, Ron Ritoch (former student of Jim Vanover), Bryan Dobler, Mike Goldbach, Reggie Jackson, Glen Hernandez, Don Boyd, and the vice president Chai's Thai Boxing Association, Tony Gneck whom he brought to Thailand in 1982 as the first American team to compete in the Muay Thai World Championships.

In 1978, he trained another Martial Arts teacher named Dan Inosanto. Inosanto trained as a student in Chai's backyard and eventually introduced Sirisute to his Jeet Kune Do teaching seminars, which greatly helped Sirisute extend awareness of Muay Thai in the US as well as internationally. In 1983 Inosanto introduced Sirisute to Tom Landry of the Dallas Cowboys who soon incorporated Muay Thai into their pre-season conditioning with Sirisute as their instructor until the time of Landry's departure in 1990.

Sirisute currently runs a Muay Thai camp in Oregon each year with more than 200 students from around the world attending. He founded the Thai Boxing Association of the US in 1968 and has expanded it to more than 18 countries around the world. He maintains a busy seminar schedule traveling around the world teaching Muay Thai today.

=== Notable students ===
- Brandon Lee American actor and stuntman, son of Bruce Lee
- Dan Inosanto Filipino-American martial arts instructor best known as a student of Bruce Lee
- David Leitch American stuntman, actor, director and stunt coordinator.
- Diana Lee Inosanto American actress, stuntwoman, and martial artist.
- Chad Stahelski American stuntman and film director
- Erik Paulson American mixed-martial artist, Senior Instructor, and MMA coach.
- Ron Balicki American actor and stuntman.
