= Edgar Sulite =

Filipino martial arts teacher (1957–1997)

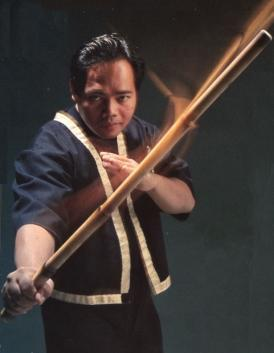
- Edgar Sulite
- Born: September 25, 1957; Tacloban City, Philippines
- Died: April 10, 1997 (aged 39)
- Occupation: Martial arts instructor
- Known for: Lameco Eskrima

Edgar Sulite (September 25, 1957 – April 10, 1997) was a teacher of Filipino martial arts. He was the creator of Lameco Eskrima and trained such notables as Dan Inosanto, Ron Balicki, Larry Hartsell, Fred Degerberg, and Diana Lee Inosanto.

Sulite trained with several martial arts masters, including Leo Gaje of Pekiti-Tirsia Kali, Antonio "Tatang" Ilustrisimo of Kalis Ilustrisimo, Jose D. Caballero of De Campo Uno-Dos-Tres Orihinal, and Jesus Abella of Modern Largos. He created a new style and called it Lameco Eskrima. The name was a combination of the Largo (long), Medio (Medium), and Corto (close quarter) techniques that he learned during his studies of Filipino martial arts.

== Biography ==
=== Life in the Philippines ===
Sulite was born in Tacloban City, Philippines in 1957. As a young boy, his father, a boxer and arnis practitioner, introduced him to Filipino martial arts. In 1981, he moved to Manila and became friends with Roland Dantes, a famous Filipino film celebrity and martial artist. This created opportunities for him to train various stunt people, celebrities, and prominent business people. Also at this time, he began to train under Antonio Ilustrisimo.

Completing college, Sulite earned his Bachelor in Arts and majored in economics. During his time in college, he sought out different Eskrima masters to study under. Sulite became a member of Bakbakan International as well as the representative for Leo Gaje's national Arnis Association of the United States.

=== Life in the US ===
On June 30, 1989, Sulite relocated to the United States and became the Eskrima instructor of Dan Inosanto, his daughter Diana, Ron Balicki, and Larry Hartsell. His plan was to bring his family over from the Philippines, own his own home, and spread Lameco throughout the world.

He managed to bring his wife, Felisa Sulite, from the Philippines in 1992, and their children followed a few years later. The couple had two more children, who were born in the US.

=== Death ===
Sulite suffered from complications arising from a stroke and died on April 10, 1997.

== Notoriety ==
Sulite made numerous appearances in popular martial arts magazines, including three cover stories and a multi-volume instructional video series. He is also the author of three books:

- Secrets of Arnis
- Advanced Balisong
- Masters of Arnis, Kali and Eskrima

== Sources ==
- Filipino Fighting Arts: Theory and Practice by Mark V. Wiley, ISBN 0-86568-180-5 Tuttle Publishing
