= Eskrido =

Eskrido, a version of Doce Pares, is a Filipino martial art that is a combination of Doce Pares, Aikido, Ju-Jitsu and Judo, with lesser influences from other Japanese systems. It features standard eskrima stick techniques mixed with Jujutsu-style locks and throws that utilize the stick. The stickwork shows a strong sword influence, and indeed the sword, knife, and other Filipino weapons are also taught. It was founded by Ciriaco "Cacoy" Cañete, who taught it in the Philippines and in seminars across the world. The martial art was established in 1951. Cañete was the highest ranking practitioner in both Doce Pares Eskrima and Eskrido.

== Bibliography ==
- SGM Cacoy Cañete (2004). ESKRIDO - Eskrima, Jiu-Jitsu and Judo Integrated (page ix & x).
- Haines, Bruce (1995). Karate's History and Traditions. Rutland: Tuttle.

== See also ==
- Arnis
- Filipino Martial Arts
