= Kalis Ilustrisimo =

Filipino martial art

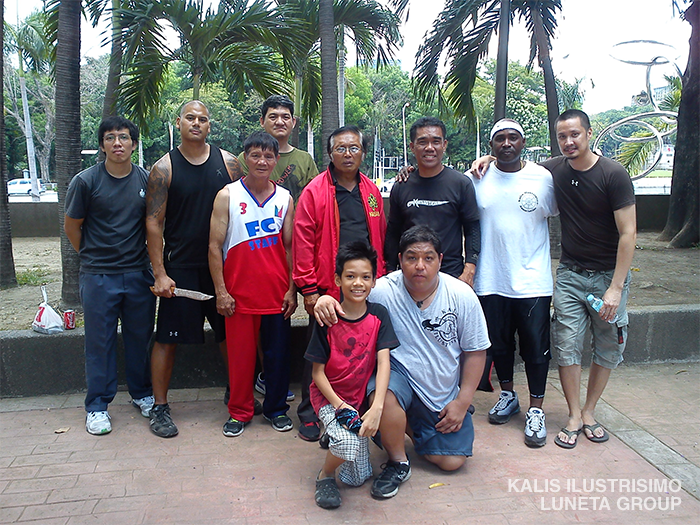
Some members of Kalis Ilustrisimo at Rizal Park

Kalis Ilustrisimo is a style of Eskrima, founded by Antonio "Tatang" Ilustrisimo.

== Name ==
Kalis Ilustrisimo means "The Bladed Art of Ilustrisimo": calis (or caris) being another term for sword, blade and knife in Luzon and the Visayas, and its usage as esgrimir and esgrima (Spanish for fencing/sword fighting). This is as defined in Spanish-era Ilocano, Pampango, Tagalog, Bicolano, Ilonggo, Waray & Cebuano dictionary/vocabulary recordings dating back to 1512, as the art of Tatang is more blade-oriented than stick-oriented.

== History ==
The Ilustrisimo clan from Bantayan Island in the Northern part of the Cebu region, was known for their Eskrima and has practiced its own traditional stick and sword fighting style for over five generations. Its first known practitioner was Pablo Ilustrisimo who passed it on to Juan de Dios Ilustrisimo, who then passed it to the brothers Isidro, Melecio and Regino (the better known of Tatang's uncles). Tatang was mentored by his father Isidro as well as by his uncles. Another ancestor was Agapito Ilustrismo, a rebel against the Spaniards who escaped to Mount Banahaw and established a religious cult.

Tatang retained his family style while he lived a long, storied, and tumultuous life and refined his fighting style from the influences of at least Pedro Cortez, a Zamboangueño bounty hunter, and a Tausug family who adopted him from age 10 to 17. He had his experiences as an eskrimador in various matches, as a seaman going around South-East Asia and as a security-enforcer for business establishments in various areas of the Philippines, including the Tondo-Binondo areas of Manila. He faced numerous duels, challenges as well as "death matches" with live blades. Family members that Tatang taught were his cousin Floro Villabrille (1912-1992) and his grandnephew Samuel Ilustrisimo.

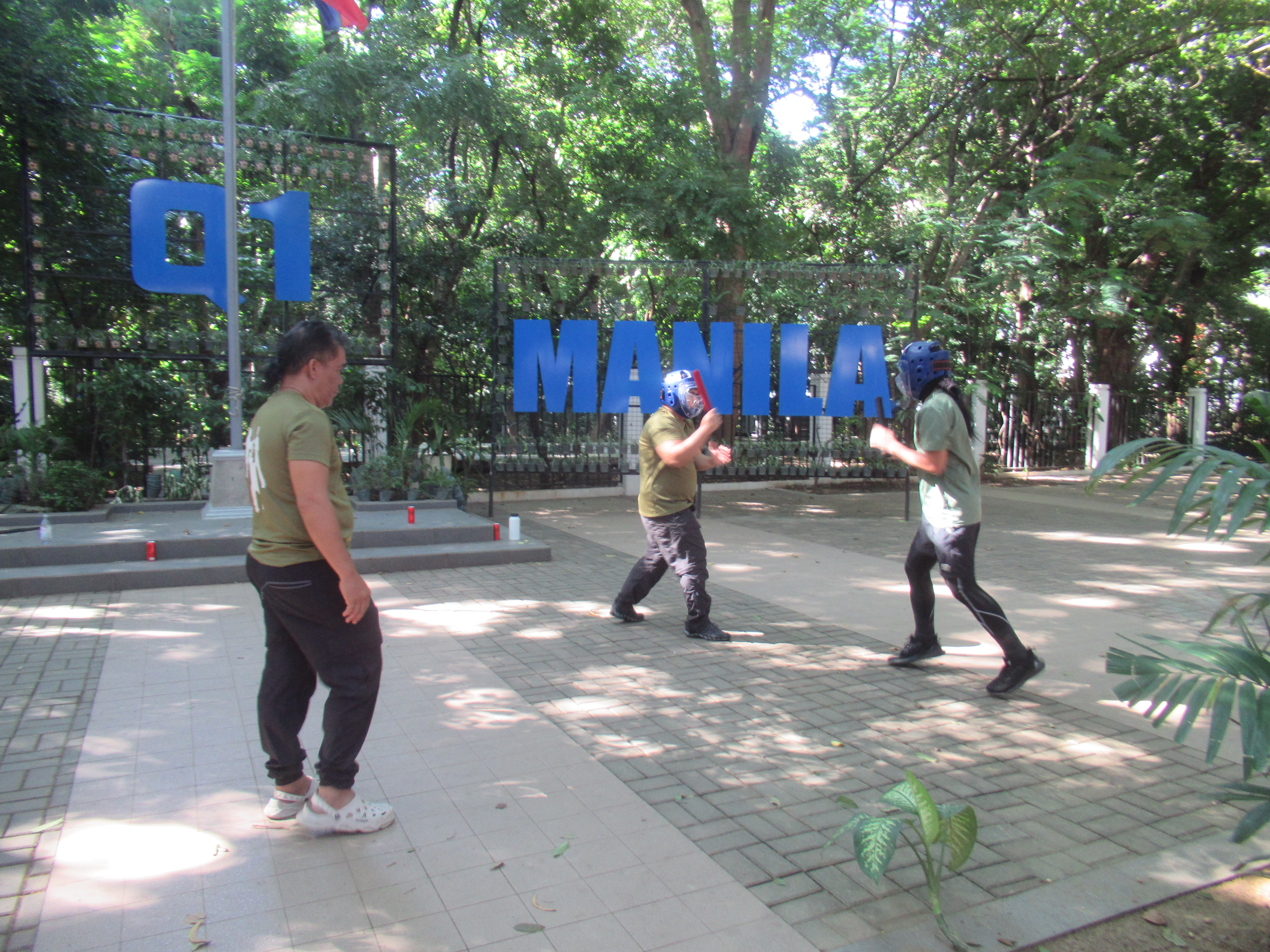
Arnold Narzo (Kalis Ilustrisimo Repeticion Orihinal Chief Instructor at the Arroceros Urban Forest Park)

Throughout most of his latter life, Tatang was secretive about his methods of fighting for they had kept him alive and undefeated for decades. It was only in 1976 that Tatang started openly teaching his refinement of the family style to "outsiders", with Antonio "Tony" Diego (1946-2014) and Epifanio "Yuli" Romo as his first students in Manila where he had migrated. Other notable students were Christopher "Topher" Ricketts (1955–2010), Romeo "Romy" Macapagal, Pedro Reyes, Edgar Sulite (1957-1997), Rey Galang, Norman Suanico, Inocencio "Sioc" Glaraga (deceased 2021), Roberto Morales (deceased 2010), Mark V. Wiley and Ernesto Talag. Prior to World War II, Tatang had also privately taught a contemporary, Timoteo Maranga (later on Major Maranga of the Cebu police force).

Even at his advanced age, Tatang retained the respect accorded him as a fighter in the tough streets of Tondo where he resided. As a testament to his reputation, archive footage of Ilustrisimo taken well into his 80s show his speed, control, timing and accuracy with sticks, blades as well as empty hand disarms against live blades in spite of his failing eyesight.

After Tatang Ilustrisimo's death in 1997, Tony Diego was elected the head of Kalis Ilustrisimo. Tony Diego later added a descriptive to the system which became known as Kalis Ilustrisimo Repeticion Orihinal. This was on the suggestion of the late Pedro Reyes—that the senior students of Tatang should set up their own schools. Thus, there were Bakbakan Kali Ilustrisimo by Rey Galang, "Kali Ilustrisimo" by Topher Ricketts, Tagpas Kalis Ilustrisimo by Romy Macapagal, Luneta Kali Ilustrisimo by Pedro Reyes and Samuel Ilustrisimo and Olistrisimo Eskrima by Roberto Morales. Romy Macapagal, as archivist of the Kalis Ilustrisimo system and not founding a school, dropped “Tagpas” and retained Kalis Ilustrismo. Romy Macapagal went on to archive the whole system on a historic project with The Immersion Labs Foundation.

Diego had named Tom Dy Tang as successor of Kalis Ilustrismo twelve years prior to his death (2002). Diego died on August 25, 2014. Peachie Baron teaches Diego’s “Punta y Daga” style. Arnold Narzo was appointed as Kalis Ilustrisimo Repeticion Orihinal Chief Instructor by GM Diego two years (2012) before his death (2014).

== Influential & famous practitioners ==
- Christopher "Topher" Ricketts
- Edgar Sulite
- Miguel Zubiri

== See also ==
- Arnis
- Kalis
- Filipino Martial Arts

== Bibliography ==
- Antonio Diego/Christopher Ricketts (2002) The Secrets of Kalis Ilustrisimo, ISBN 0-8048-3145-9.
