= Garimot Arnis =

Filipino martial art

Garimot Arnis (or Garimot Arnis de Mano) is a Filipino martial art developed by Gat Puno (Chieftain) Abon "Garimot" Baet. He is the 5th generation inheritor of his family art. Garimot Arnis is a system composed of three basic parts: arnis de mano (weapons), buno (wrestling), and hilot (healing). The defining characteristic of the system is in keeping yourself safe. This is done by meticulously studying the footwork, angles, and distancing of largo mano (long hand) to keep yourself out of your opponent's range while keeping him in your range. In corto (close) range, the opponent's ability to attack must be shut down as quickly as possible, through a disarm, lock, or manipulation of the opponent's body, which sets up the finish. Above all, knowledge of hilot allows you to keep yourself healthy by helping to fight illness and injuries, especially injuries caused during arnis and buno training.

"Garimot" (from Paeteno slang "garaymot," meaning "absorber") was the fighting nickname of Gat Puno's father Felipe. Gat Puno took the name in his father's honor, and used it to name his family's system. Garimot Arnis consists of many styles, including:

- Cinco Teros – a style popular in Luzon, characterized by its use of five angles. Garimot Cinco Teros introduces the student to the basic theories of largo mano and corto, and was added to Garimot Arnis by Grandmaster Jose "Uti" Baet (3rd generation).
- Tres Puntos – a knife-fighting style from Batangas, the home of the balisong, characterized by its emphasis on thrusting and its use of three points. Garimot Tres Puntos uses the balisong and sling blade (developed by Grandmaster Felipe "Garimot" Baet), as well as common daggers and knives. It has been in the Garimot system since Grandmaster Lino "Bisaya" Baet (2nd generation).
- Siete Colores – a popular style in Laguna, characterized by its use of seven angles. Garimot Siete Colores is introduced after a student has become an expert in Cinco Teros, and teaches new theories of largo mano and corto, and includes the Laban Tulisan (Bandit Fighting) used by guerrilla warriors in Laguna. Though Laban Tulisan was introduced by Grandmaster Jose "Uti" Baet, Siete Colores has always been a part of the Baet family style.
- Doce Pares – this style is from Laguna, and not to be confused with the Doce Pares of Cebu. It is introduced after proficiency in Siete Colores, and provides further training in the classical arnis of Laguna. Doce Pares has been in the Garimot system since Grandmaster Elias "Tata" Baet (1st generation).
- Larong Moro-Moro – a play which dramatizes the triumph of the Spanish Christians over the Muslim Moors, used by the Filipinos to preserve their fighting arts. Garimot Arnis preserves the 30 traditional sequences of the battle-dances in the moro-moro, and all students are required to learn them and the hidden application, with a variety of weapons and shields. Every member of the Garimot lineage has been a moro-moro player.
- Doble Teros – this is a style of double stick/sword fighting from Pampanga which includes the abaniko and sinawali methods. It is introduced early in Garimot Arnis Training.
- Sikadtukan – Filipino kickboxing, that nevertheless includes a few throws and locks.
- Buno – a composite of native wrestling styles of the Philippines. It contains standing (clinch) work and groundfighting, including throws, locks, and chokes. Animal characteristics are emulated, but the two primary animals are the tiger and monkey, which represent the dichotomies of aggressive/passive, direct/evasive, hard/soft, etc. Grandmaster Jose "Uti" Baet was an accomplished wrestler, studied with Aetas, and taught Grandmaster Felipe "Garimot" Baet (4th generation), who in turn studied with the Mangyans.
- Lubid – part of the weaponry of Garimot Buno is the lubid (rope), though the principles apply to any flexible item, such as a belt, sarong, scarf or bandana. Garimot lubid training involves study of ways of holding, drawing, and striking with the weapon, as well as disarming, locking, choking, and tying the opponent.
- Hilot – native healing techniques of the Philippines, which include massage, herbs (internal and external use), oils, vinegar, water, and 'cupping.' Every member of the Garimot lineage has been a skilled hilot.

== See also ==
- Arnis
- Buno
- Filipino Martial Arts
