= Pekiti-Tirsia Kali =

Style of Filipino martial arts

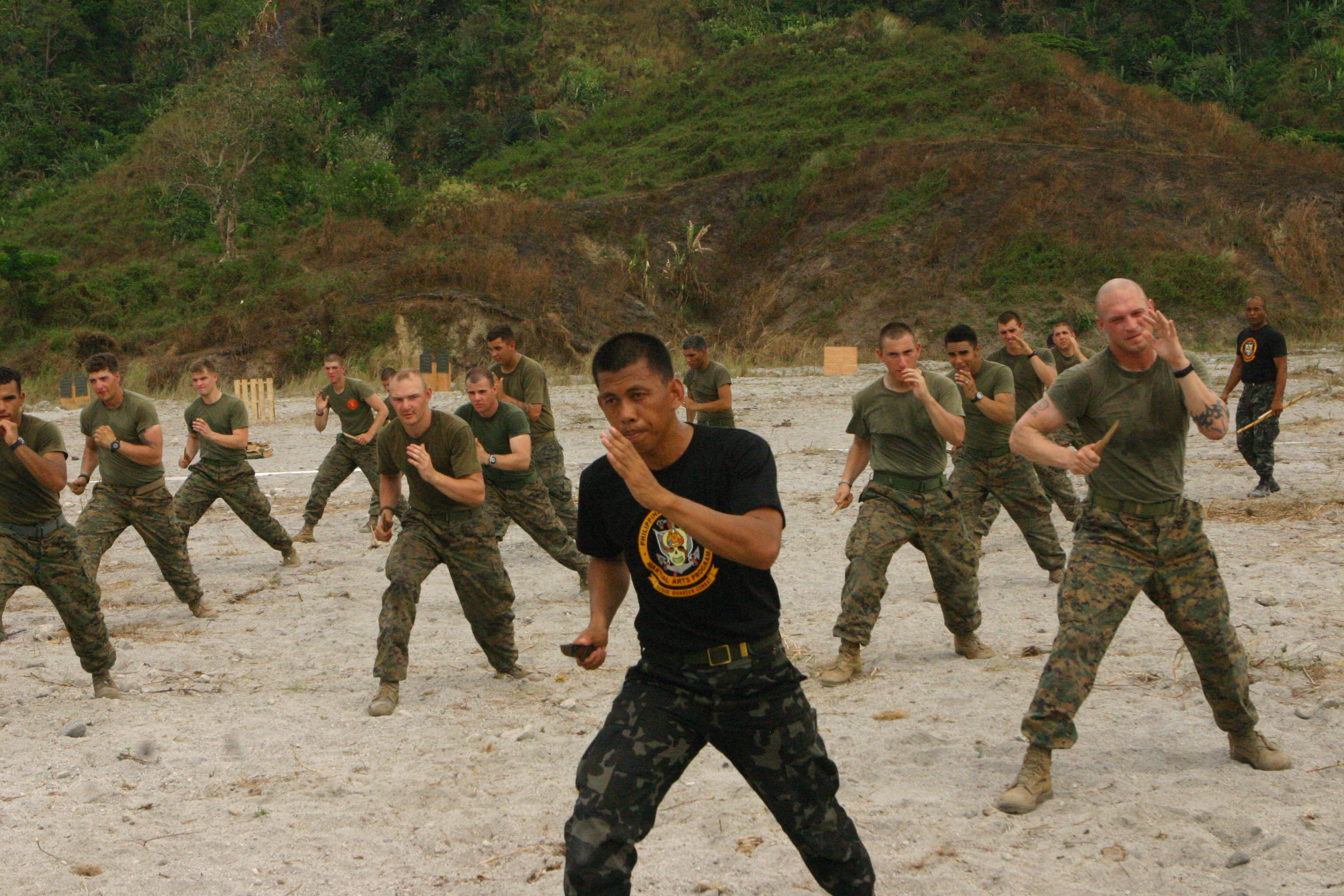
- Philippine Marine Corps instructor teaching US Marines the Philippine Marine Corps Martial Arts-Kali during military exercises.
- Also known as: Pekiti-Tirsia
- Focus: Edged/Impact/Empty Hand Weapons
- Country of origin: Philippines
- Famous practitioners: Norberto Tortal; Conrado Tortal; Leo T. Gaje Jr. Rommel Tortal
- Olympic sport: No

Pekiti-Tirsia Kali, originally known as Pekiti-Tirsia Arnis, is a style specific to Filipino martial arts. It derives from the arnis style or art of the Tortal family, said to date back to 1897. The sole heir and guardian of this system is Leo Gaje. Pekiti-Tirsia is strictly a combat-oriented system, as opposed to a sport-focused fighting style. It is a fighting system that focuses on edged, impact, and improvised weapons. PTK has been adopted as one of the preferred combative training programs by several elite military and law enforcement units around the world. It is considered a highly lethal method of self-defense.

== Origin and history ==
Pekiti-Tirsia's movements are based on the traditional blade art of arnis.

Pekiti-Tirsia Kali specifically was derived from a family system that goes back at least four generations, starting with Norberto Tortal. It was further developed and improved during the years 1930-36 by his grandson Conrado Tortal. The system is now headed by Leo Gaje, the grandson of Conrado Tortal.

Gaje introduced his system to North America as Pekiti-Tirsia Arnis after arriving in the US in 1972. The invented faux-native term Kali was adopted in later years in place of the Spanish-derived Arnis. His style earned recognition from major martial arts organizations such as the Jewish Karate Federation, the United States Karate Association International, and the United States Karate Federation. His system has been an influence on the Dog Brothers, Dan Inosanto and other FMA practitioners. He has since brought the system to various European countries as well.

In 1995, Pekiti Tirsia International was formed in the US. In 1997, this organization went its own way. It is currently headed by Bill McGrath (President and Chief Instructor). (Law Enforcement Director), Magino'o Dan Inosanto (North American Director), Sifu Manfred Steiner (European Director), Ralf Beckmann (Director for Germany), and Roberto Bonomelli and Attilio Acquistapace (Co-Directors for Italy).

In 1996, Pekiti-Tirsia Europe Organization was formed, with Uli Weidle as Managing Director.

In the year 1997, the Centennial Celebration for 100 years of Pekiti-Tirsia was celebrated in Subic Bay, Zambales, Philippines on October 25, 1997. Pekiti-Tirsia was the only Filipino Martial Art officially recognized as having a centennial.

In 2003, Pekiti Tirsia Global was established. PTKGO (Tim Waid) National Directors include Leo Gaje. and Rommel Tortal in the Philippines, Timothy D. Waid in the United States, Philip Gelinas in Canada, and Uli Weidle in Europe.

== Fighting methods ==
All fighting ranges are integral parts of the Pekiti-Tirsia system, but special attention is given to closing in to kill in close quarters combat. Integral to this is a coiled close quarters stance that allows evasion and generation of powerful strikes even within close range. Pekiti-Tirsia is about quartering the opponent, or 'cutting up into little pieces', emphasizing destruction with counter offence while not getting hit. The Pekiti-Tirsia methodology originates from offensive and counter offensive principles against attacks from all ranges, angles and threat levels. There is less emphasis on purely defensive techniques per se, as this is not seen as an effective survival strategy.

Pekiti-Tirsia Kali incorporates 5 main weapon categories (including the human body):

- Solo Baston - Single stick, sword or spear.
- Doble Baston - Double stick or sword.
- Malayu Sibat - Spear
- Espada y Daga - Sword and Dagger.
- Daga y Daga - Knife to Knife
- Mano y Mano - Hand to Hand.
- Dumog - Grappling

There are various subsystems of training that have evolved over the years, including:

- Doce Methodos (These are the 12 methods or subsystems of the Pekiti-Tirsia system. Each is a distinct grouping of techniques and related application methods which represent the core principle of that subsystem. A condensed form of 64 movements called the 64 Attacks illustrates many of those subsystems.)
- Seguidas (bridging techniques between different ranges: sometimes included as part of Doces Methodos)
- Contradas (countering techniques with emphasis on following the attack as opposed to meeting the attack)
- Recontras (re-countering techniques)
- Recontradas (recountering against the recounter techniques)
- Offensa-Defensa—Defensa-Offensa (evasion drills for weapon arm)
- Contra Tirsia Dubla Doz
- Tri-V Formula
- Capsula Methodica
- As well, other training aids have developed, including Alphabeto and Numerado, which pattern strikes based on the alphabet and numbers respectively...
- Specialization A:

All of the basic 64 attacks including the breakdown of Thrust and Tapping, Break In/Break out, Five attacks, Seven attacks, and Clock system includes advanced techniques of Sequidas, Contradas, and Recontras. There are inserts along the way of unarmed knife tapping, bladework, locks and technical throws, unarmed combat and armed combat. Footwork strategy and handiwork with the weapon are also most important.

- Specialization B:

Doce Methodos, a unique structure compatible to any mode of attacks using the Diagonal V and Reverse V.

- Specialization C:

Contra Tirsia Dubla Doz, a methodology now advanced into the Tri-V Formula and the Edged Impact Weapon Tactical Combat, Edged Impact Weapon Control Dynamics, and Edged Impact Weapon Survival Tactics.

- Specialization D:

Advanced mastery with combination of the TRi-V Formula and the Capsula Methodica, and the Mastery of the Dagaso Tirsia for Single knife and the Qol Demama Daga. The combined structures are applicable to full contact stick fighting.

- Specialization E:

Combining the Contra Tirsia Dubla Doz and Tri-V Formula that will lead to Capsula Methodica.
