= San Miguel Eskrima =

- Focus: Stick fighting
- Country of origin: Philippines
- Creator: Filemon Cañete
- Olympic sport: No

San Miguel Eskrima is one of the major systems of eskrima, a martial arts from the Philippines. Founded by Filemon "Momoy" Cañete of the Doce Pares Club, SME served as vehicle for his own personal expression of the art and methodology of the club of which he was a co-founder and instructor. The name San Miguel (or Saint Michael) is taken from Michael (archangel), the slayer of Satan, and is one of the major strikes used in Eskrima (From right shoulder to left hip).

== The system ==
San Miguel Eskrima is blade-based martial art system wherein various weapons are used as a primary training tools to teach universally transferable skills.

There are two schools of thought on the birth of the San Miguel Eskrima style: The first, sees the San Miguel Eskrima part of an older style called Eskrima of God and Founded by the Ortega Family and more recently by Father Miguel Ortega, Father Jose Ortega and Father Nicolas Ortega in 1930 in Talaga (Argao).

- Father Miguel Ortega, was President of the Church of Talaga City, co-founder of the Eskrima style of God and Founder of the style of San Miguel Eskrima called SM Dubli X, style that preferred Long Distance and Medium Distance using passing and rushing shots. Among the few students of Father Miguel Ortega we find Filemon Momoy Canete, who later gives his name to his personal interpretation of San Miguel Eskrima Dubli X, "San Miguel Eskrima" in Cebu City.

- Father Nicolas Ortega was responsible for the training of the Filipino rebels during the Japanese invasion, and was awarded a National recognition still present today in front of the church of Talaga with a statue that represents it.

- Father Jose Ortega, co-founder of the Eskima of God, taught the style of the Church to the Seminarists of Talaga.

The Foundation of the Eskrima of God is linked to a lineage that took place within the Ecclesiastical Order, from Priest to Priest over time and the style began in the late 1800s. In the first school of thought the San Miguel Eskrima founded by the GM Momoy Canete would have only been a small technical part of the style San Miguel Eskrima Dubli X (which in turn was part of the older style called Eskrima of God) or The San Miguel Eskrima X System, to which Momoy gave the name in appreciation and respect towards his Original Master Father Miguel Ortega and in which passing shots were preferred, and double passing strokes, short strokes using the technique of Arco de abaniko and totsada, without an emphasis specific to only one type of weapon, but single stick, double stick, knife, double knife, espada y daga (sword and dagger) (taught to Momoy not by Father Miguel Ortega but by Gm Jesuis Qui to Cebu City), bankaw, saguidas. The steps of the San Miguel Eskrima X System were cross legs and Linambay.

While in the second school of thought, in San Miguel Eskrima special emphasis is placed on training with the espada y daga (sword and dagger) that Momoy has learned from Jesuis Qui. The system encompasses single and double stick, dagger, long blade, bullwhip, staff as well as non-weapon, empty hand areas such as striking, elbows, takedowns, chokes, knees and kicks. Like all eskrima systems, San Miguel Eskrima uses the rattan stick as a primary teaching tool in place of other bladed weapons.

San Miguel Eskrima is characterized by constant movement, efficiency and simplicity. Proper and precise body mechanics are emphasized, as do proper striking involving speed and power. Although the system trains with both low stances and stand up stances more common in today's Doce Pares as influenced by Momoy's brother Cacoy, the former (low) stances are preferred by SME practitioners for its power and stability. However, both low and high stances are employed when the situation arises. The system encompasses close quarter (corto) fighting with weapons and empty hands, long range (largo mano) and throws/grappling (dumog).

San Miguel Eskrima training is skill based, as opposed to technique based. Constant drilling, forms and "repitacions" are combined with one-on-one touch hands guided sparring with the instructor. It is for this skill based approach that SME needs to be taught in a more intimate setting between instructor and student or a smaller group where touching hands with an instructor is essential. It is through this type of interaction that sensitivity is heightened and the instructor "guides" the student. For certain aspects of San Miguel Eskrima such as drills and forms, these aspects of San Miguel Eskrima make it difficult to teach in a large classroom and seminar based environment.

A common source of confusion is that San Miguel Eskrima is separate from Doce Pares; not realizing that San Miguel was a particular expression and methodology of Momoy within the Doce Pares Club and system. Many of the current Doce Pares drills have their roots and terminology in Momoy. Momoy was the club's founder and its longest instructor until his death in 1995.

== Filemon "Momoy" Cañete - founder ==
Born Filemon Cañete, on November 22, 1904, in the central Philippine island of Cebu, Momoy was the chief instructor of the Doce Pares Club for 55 years until his death in 1995. Together with Lorenzo Saavedra, Teodoro Saavedra, Rostico Cobarrubias and others they formed the Labangon Fencing Club in 1920. In 1932, Momoy joined both Saavedras and his other brothers to form the Doce Pares Club.

Momoy was part of Cebu's famed Cañete clan of eskrimadors (martial artists that practiced eskrima). His brothers included Eulogio (Euling, b. 1919), Tirso, Ciriaco (Cacoy), Rufino and Silvestre.

== Organizations ==
With the passing of its founder, Momoy's son Andres "Kano" Cañete has become one of the current official recognized bearers of the system. The remaining top students, former well-known fighters of Momoy and now Grandmasters, Benjamin "Ben" Culanag, Urbano "Banoy" Borja, Federico Mendoza Jnr, Edring Casio, Genaro "Naro" Mendoza serve as the Advisory Council of the system. He will be the first Student of Momoy to open the Club of San Miguel Eskrima in Mambalin Street along with Idring Casio and Prudencio Ondo Caburnay(Lapunti Arnis). The council oversees all functions of the San Miguel Eskrima organization including curriculum and organizational direction.

In addition, the system has expanded globally through independent organizations that maintain its principles while adapting to contemporary practice. One such organization is Filmocan San Miguel Eskrima International, founded by Momoy's grandson, Panto Canete Flores. The group focuses on preserving Filemon “Momoy” Cañete’s original teachings and incorporates classical blade-based techniques alongside modern training approaches.

== See also ==
- Arnis
- Filipino Martial Arts
