= Jose Caballero (martial artist) =

Filipino martial artist (1907–1987)

Jose D. Caballero (August 7, 1907 – August 24, 1987) was the founder of a Filipino martial art called De Campo Uno-Dos-Tres Orihinal, also commonly known as De Campo 1-2-3, and is considered the Juego Todo champion of his era.

== Overview ==
=== Early life ===
Caballero was born in the barangay (neighborhood) of Ibo, Toledo, Cebu, in the Philippine archipelago. As a youth, he would travel from barangay to barangay in order to watch eskrima matches during fiesta celebrations. Caballero, despite his youth, had observed the loopholes of the other fighters. He observed that most of them use the same techniques: opponents ending in close-range fighting where disarming and butt-striking were commonly applied. He then thought that techniques could be devised to counter the existing techniques of other Masters. He was still in his elementary years when he thought of the possibilities of devising, combining, checking and balancing techniques and forms to come out with a distinct more versatile style not easily predictable by existing Masters.

=== His art ===
At the energetic age of 18 (1925), Caballero joined the Philippine Constabulary where he honed to the fullest the versatilities of his arnis system. He formally named his arnis system “De Campo Uno-Dos-Tres Orehenal”. “De Campo” to counter the strikes of his opponent (Also means from the fields), “Uno” to fake or feint, “Dos” to counter the counter strikes of the opponent, “Tres” to hit (finish) the opponent and “Orehenal” a reference to the technique as his own original style. In recapitulation it could be deduced that the name “De campo Uno-Dos-Tres Orihenal” is actually a set procedure, a step by step series of effective action against an opponent. The name itself reveals the succession of movements which is the essence of Master Caballeros style (striking in a series of threes). From his observations of these Eskrima exhibitions, he modified moves with an emphasis on three striking levels: the eyes, lower arms (specifically elbows and hands), and knees. He was a fan of Western movies and often compared his style to the gunslinger "quick draw".

=== Eskrima matches ===
In 1925, Caballero's skills were put to the test. His PC commander in Camp Ketley, Dansalan, Lanao del Sur (now Marawi City), needed a bodyguard who was skilful in Eskrima. Caballero applied for the position, but another known Eskrima fighter from llocos Sur by the name of Juan Carolla also wanted the post. Carolla's feats in arnis were also considered legendary. Since the PC commander needed only one body guard, a duel to determine the better fighter was agreed upon. In the first round, Carolla was hit in the head which made him collapse and unable to continue on with the fight, giving Caballero the victory. However, a rematch was scheduled for the following day and again Carolla was hit in the head, confirming Caballero's superior skills over his opponent. Carolla finally conceded in defeat and bowed to Caballero in respect.

In 1936, Caballero defeated a well known fighter named Horje Navado from San Carlos City. Navado was feared to have beaten 7 eskrimadors with his feet constrained to stepping only on 3 coconut shells forming a triangle.

In 1939, Cabaellero engaged an eskrimador named Anoy in what would become one of his notable fights. Anoy, who was from the nearby town of Tangub, was a formidable challenger as he was known to be able to bend an iron bar around his waist using his bare hands. In the duel, Anoy was hit by Caballero in the left hand then in the head and subsequently lost consciousness. The combination of strikes was delivered so quickly that the crowd had not fully understood what had just taken place. This resulted in the misconception that the match was fixed and they began shouting "Tayope!" (fixed). One of Anoy's local supporters attacked Caballero but was fortunately intercepted and subdued with a strike to the hand. Caballero then asked helped from the Philippine Constabulary fearing more reprisals arising from the fight.

In 1943, Caballero defeated Isidro Aguanta, a famous eskrimador from Canlaon, Negros Occidental. Aguanta was a notorious killer, having previously killed 7 men.

In 1945, Alfredo Macalolan lost to Caballero. Macalolan is a Suban-on from Dinggonaa settlement in Ozamis. He surrendered after being hit in the hand. Caballero recalled that among all his opponents who were hit in the hand, it was only Macalolan who he was not able to send the stick flying in the air.

In 1950, Balbino Mancao, the bodyguard of a prominent politician, challenged Caballero and lost. It was held in the cockpit area in Ozamis and was historically one of Caballero's shortest bouts. Tanciong Lopez, a boxer and eskrimador from Cebu, went to Ozamis to avenge the defeat of his teacher but was unmatched by Caballero; he was not able to deliver any blows.

In his prime, Caballero was the Juego Todo (All Out, no holds barred) champion and beat several famous Eskrimadors and some lesser known challengers.

=== Notable students ===
- Ireneo L. Olavides founder of Eskrima De Campo JDC-IO.
- Edgar G. Sulite founder of Lameco Eskrima.

== Sources ==
- "Filipino Martial Arts" magazine - Special 2006 issue, "Legends of The Filipino Martial Arts"
- ”Secrets of Arnis” by Edgar Sulite
- http://www.eskrimadecampo.com/
- http://www.decampo.8m.com/about.html
