= Antonio Ilustrisimo =

Filipino martial artist

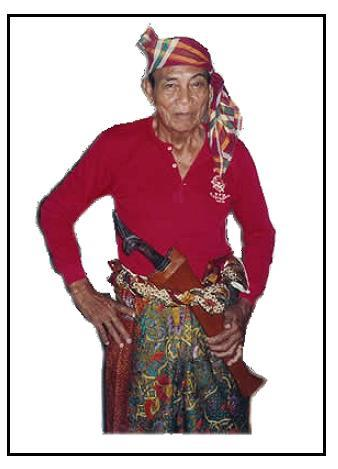
Antonio "Tatang" Ilustrisimo

Antonio "Tatang" Ilustrisimo (1904 in Bagong, Bantayan, Cebu – 1997) was the Grandmaster of Kalis Ilustrisimo (KI), a Filipino martial art bearing his family name. His granduncle is also Agapito Illustrisimo which is a sacred guy who started Samahan ng Tatlong Persona Solo Dios

== Early life ==
As a boy, Ilustrisimo studied eskrima from his father. At the age of nine, he decided to travel to the United States. He stowed away on a boat he thought was headed for America. Instead, he arrived in Mindanao in the southern Philippines.

== The martial arts ==
Ilustrisimo was one of the most well-respected eskrimadors in the Philippines. He was famed for winning countless duels and street encounters, as well as taking up arms as a guerrilla fighter against the invading Japanese forces during World War II. Ilustrisimo was never defeated in combat, and earned great respect as a result of his brave exploits against the Japanese.

In 1976, at the age of 72, Ilustrisimo accepted his first students, Antonio Diego and Epifanio 'Yuli' Romo. He had previously refused to accept students because of his work. After his death in 1997, Tony Diego was elected head of KI. Other notable students include Rey Galang, Christopher Ricketts, Romeo Macapagal, Henry Espera and Norman Suanico.

== Death ==
Unfortunately, Ilustrisimo died a poor man. He was never recognized for his efforts in World War II.

== Publications ==
His life and art were featured in the book titled Filipino Martial Culture by Mark Wiley. The same author included a section on Kalis Ilustrisimo in Filipino Fighting Arts: Theory and Practice. Two of his most prominent students, Antonio Diego and Christopher Ricketts, published The Secrets of Kalis Ilustrisimo in the United States, with a foreword by Wiley.

== See also ==
- Arnis
- Filipino Martial Arts
- Lameco Eskrima
