= Dan Inosanto =

Filipino-American martial arts instructor (born 1936)

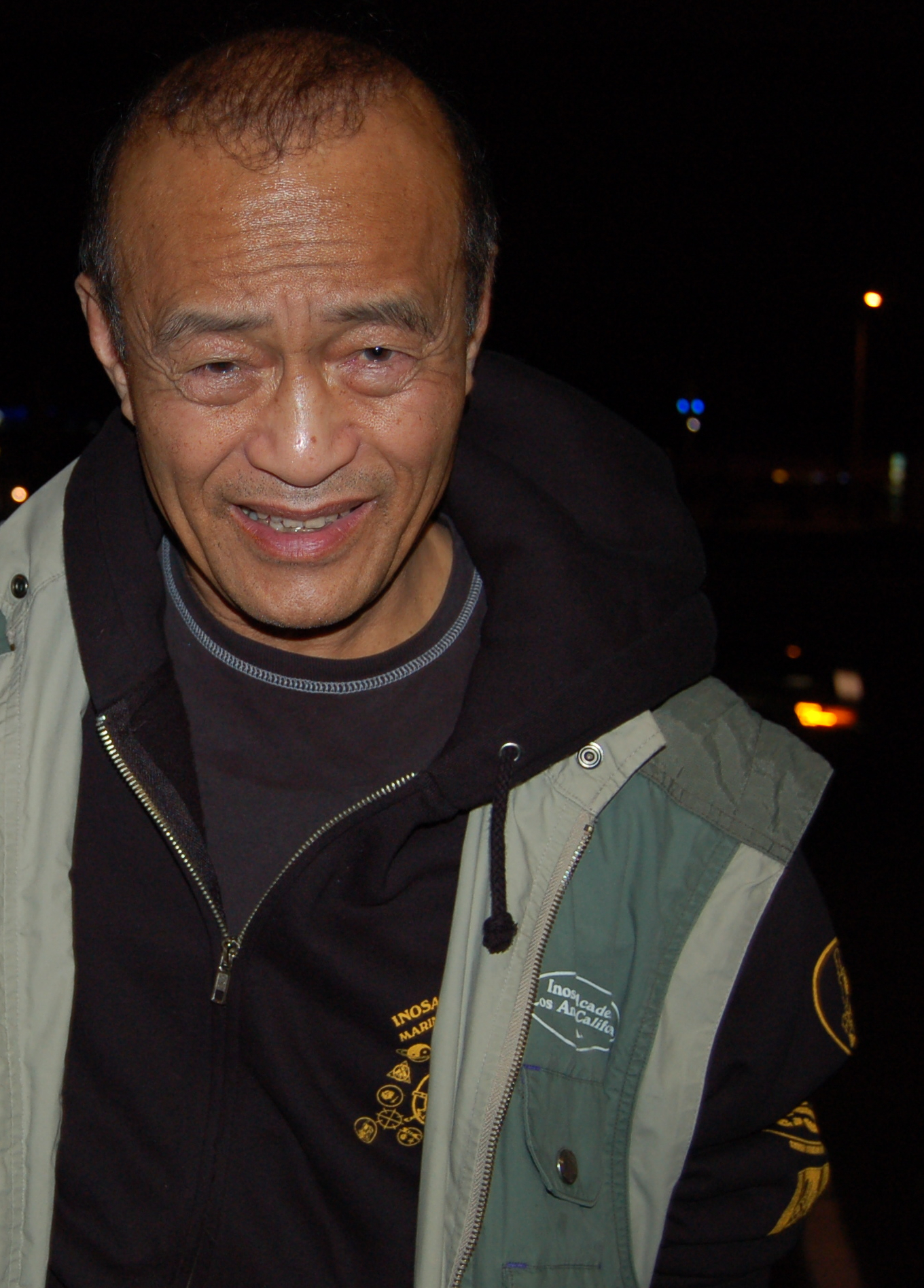
- Born: July 24, 1936 (age 90); Stockton, California, U.S.
- Occupations: Martial arts instructor; actor
- Style: Jeet Kune Do; Eskrima; Brazilian Jiu Jitsu; Kenpo Karate; Muay Thai; Pencak Silat; Tai Chi; Shooto; Judo
- Spouses: Paula Inosanto (former); Sue Inosanto
- Children: 3, including Diana Lee Inosanto

Dan Inosanto (born July 24, 1936) is a Filipino American martial arts instructor and actor. Inosanto holds instructor or black belt level ranks in several martial arts. He has studied traditional Karate, Judo, Jujutsu, Kung Fu, Shooto, Muay Thai, Tai Chi, Arnis, and Jeet Kune Do. He was one of three people who were appointed to teach at one of the three Jun Fan Gung Fu institutes under Bruce Lee, the other two being Taky Kimura and James Yimm Lee. After Bruce Lee's death, Inosanto became the principal spokesperson and historian for Jeet Kune Do.

Inosanto is credited for training martial arts to a number of Hollywood actors including Bruce Lee, Chuck Norris and others. He has had minor roles in a number of films, including Lee's uncompleted last film Game of Death (1972), and Steven Seagal's Out for Justice (1991).

== Early life and education ==
Inosanto was born on July 24, 1936 in Stockton, California.

He began training in martial arts at the age of 11 receiving instruction from his uncle who first taught him traditional Okinawan Karate and later also Judo and Jujutsu. He was a student of Ed Parker, from whom he received a shodan rank in American Kenpo. Dan served as a paratrooper with the 101st Airborne Division from 1959 to 1961. He was also a member of the Strategic Army Corps. At Fort Campbell he refined his skills in various martial arts, training under Henry Slomanski.

Inosanto is one of three people who have been appointed to teach at one of the three Jun Fan Gung Fu Institutes under Bruce Lee; Taky Kimura and James Yimm Lee are the other two people. Inosanto studied with different martial arts masters elsewhere in the United States, Southeast Asia, and Europe, including Johnny Lacoste and Chai Sirisute. After Bruce Lee's death, Inosanto became the principal spokesperson and historian for Jeet Kune Do. He has had minor roles in a number of films, including Bruce Lee's uncompleted last film Game of Death (1972). During this time period (1964–75), he also taught physical education at Malaga Cove Intermediate School in Palos Verdes Estates, California. Dan was commissioned in 1977 by the Dallas Cowboys to incorporate martial arts into the team’s training.

The film I Am Bruce Lee provided Inosanto an opportunity to reveal a little-known fact about the friendship the two men shared. Inosanto was teacher to Bruce Lee, introducing him to nunchaku. Inosanto explained that he introduced the weapon to Lee, taught him the basics and some exercises to get him started on his weapons training. The Game of Death movie, one of the most recognizable of the Bruce Lee films, showcases the use of the nunchaku by Lee and Inosanto. He is featured as the Black Belt magazine's 1996 "Man of the Year".

Inosanto holds Instructor or black belt level ranks in several martial arts. He is known for promoting the Filipino Martial Arts. He is responsible for bringing several obscure forms of the South East Asia Martial Arts into the public eye such as Silat, a hybrid combative form existing in such countries as Indonesia, Malaysia, and the Philippines. He has also been promoted to fifth degree black belt in the Machado family style of Brazilian Jiu Jitsu. He trained Shoot wrestling under Yorinaga Nakamura. Currently he is the vice-president of Lameco International, carrying on the Eskrima of the late Filipino martial artist Edgar Sulite. Inosanto has appeared on YouTube videos talking about training in Systema and appreciation for his teacher, Martin Wheeler.

== Notable students ==
Inosanto teaches The Art and Philosophy of Jeet Kune Do, Filipino Martial Arts, Shoot Wrestling, Brazilian Jiu Jitsu, Eskrima, Muay Thai, Silat, and other arts at his Marina del Rey, California school, the Inosanto Academy of Martial Arts.

- Diana Lee Inosanto
- Bruce Lee: Inosanto taught him Tabak-Toyok and staff.
- Brandon Lee
- Ron Balicki
- Denzel Washington
- Edgar Sulite
- Jeff Imada
- Erik Paulson
- Graciela Casillas-Tortorelli
- Ernest Emerson
- Ricky Nelson
- Jerry Poteet
- Salem Assli
- Arndt Mallepree
- Kenny Barry

== Publications ==
- Filipino Martial Arts as Taught by Dan Inosanto by Dan Inosanto ISBN 0-938676-01-6
- Absorb What Is Useful (Jeet Kune Do Guidebook Vol 2) by Dan Inosanto ISBN 0-938676-03-2
- Jeet kune do by Salem Assli and Dan Inosanto ISBN 2-7027-0693-2
- Guide to Martial Arts Training With Equipment by Dan Inosanto ISBN 0-938676-02-4
- Jeet Kune Do: The Art & Philosophy of Bruce Lee by Dan Inosanto ISBN 0-938676-00-8
- Jeet Kune Do: Conditioning and Grappling Methods Intro by Dan Inosanto ISBN 0-9531766-5-7

== Filmography ==
=== Actor ===
- 2008 Redbelt as Master Joāo "The Professor" Moro
- 2007 Big Stan as Knife fighting Cook
- 2003 Brazilian Brawl as Ruben
- 1991 Out for Justice as "Sticks"
- 1986 Big Trouble in Little China (as Daniel Inosanto)
- 1981 Sharky's Machine as Chin #1
- 1981 Long de ying zi (as Danny Inosanto)
- 1981 Skirmish
- 1981 The Chinese Stuntman as Filipino Fighter
- 1978 Game of Death as Pasquale, Filipino Fighter
- 1975 The Killer Elite as Japanese Killer
- 1972 The Game of Death as 3rd Floor Guardian
- 1966 The Green Hornet (episode title: "Praying Mantis") (Stuntman for Mako)

=== Documentaries ===
- 2012 I Am Bruce Lee
- 2008 The Legend of Bruce Lee
- 2006 Fight Science
- 2002 Modern Warriors
- 2002 Bruce Lee: The Immortal Dragon
- 2000 Bruce Lee in G.O.D.: Shibôteki yûgi
- 2000 Bruce Lee: A Warrior's Journey
- 1999 Famous Families (The Lees: Action Speaks Louder)
- 1998 The Path of the Dragon
- 1997 E! True Hollywood Story (Brandon Lee)
- 1993 Bruce Lee: The Curse of the Dragon
- 1993 Dragon: The Bruce Lee Story
- 1977 Bruce Lee, the Legend
- 1976 The Warrior Within
- 1976 Bruce Lee's Secret
- 1973 Life and Legend of Bruce Lee

=== Stunts ===
- 1996 Escape from L.A. (stunts)
- 1966 The Green Hornet (1 episode) (fight double)

== Bibliography ==
- Kelly, Perry W. (2000). Dan Inosanto: The Man, The Teacher, The Artist. Paladin Press. ISBN 978-1-58160-079-7.
- Tucci, Rick (1994). "Dan Inosanto Returns to Black Belt". Black Belt. Vol. 33, no. 8. pp. 42–43–44–45–48–140–141.
