= De Campo Uno-Dos-Tres Orihinal =

- Focus: Stick fighting
- Country of origin: Philippines
- Creator: Jose Caballero
- Olympic sport: No

De Campo Uno-Dos-Tres Orihinal (also referred to as De Campo 1-2-3 and De Campo Original) is a form of Filipino martial arts. The majority of its techniques are based on fighting with a single stick as opposed to the double stick method used in most Filipino martial arts.

It was created by Jose Caballero. There are many theories with regard to the origin of the system's name. One theory stated that it was derived from Caballero's middle name "Diaz" and his surname. He once proclaimed that when you lift heavy objects, it is assisted by the count of three; "Uno Dos y Tres!”. This is indicative of the simplicity in which techniques are taught and executed within the art. Another theory was that "De Campo" pertained to the fact that the system was conceived in the field or farm. The three counts, on the other hand, referred to the frequency and speed of hits in some of the system's techniques, wherein three separate strikes are usually perceived of as only one due to the speed and power by which these are executed. The Tagalog word "orihinal" is translated as "original".

== Training ==
Many Filipino Martial Arts use the stick to represent or transition to blade, and this also applies to De Campo Original. The length of this stick generally varies from 28 to 30 inches. Newcomers progress through three different levels; training is intense and needs to be executed with maximum strength and endurance. De Campo Original uses angular strikes common in most arnis systems, except it does not have a vertical (12 o'clock) strike. De Campo Original emphasizes wide, powerful strikes that can be adapted for execution at any range. There is also a specific footwork for De Campo Original; it does not adhere to the "triangle footwork" emphasized by most arnis systems.

Among Jose Caballero's notable students were his protégés Ireneo L. Olavides and Edgar Sulite. Both of them would go on to form their own organizations; Olivades established JDC-IO, while Sulite established LAMECO. His son, Grandmaster Mawe Caballero, served in the military and was also noted for his exceptional fighting skill and mastery of his father's system. He won second place in the NARAPHIL tournament conducted in Cebu City, and earned the distinction of fighting without any protective gear. Mawe Caballero had many students, both local and foreign. Another of Jose Caballero's sons, Grandmaster Salvador Caballero, taught various law enforcement agencies around the country using an eclectic fighting system that had De Campo as its core.

The current heir of the system, Master Jong Caballero, the eldest of Mawe's sons, continues to practice and teach De Campo Original. He resides in Toledo City, Cebu, Philippines.

== See also ==
- Arnis
- Filipino Martial Arts
