= Sports in the Philippines =

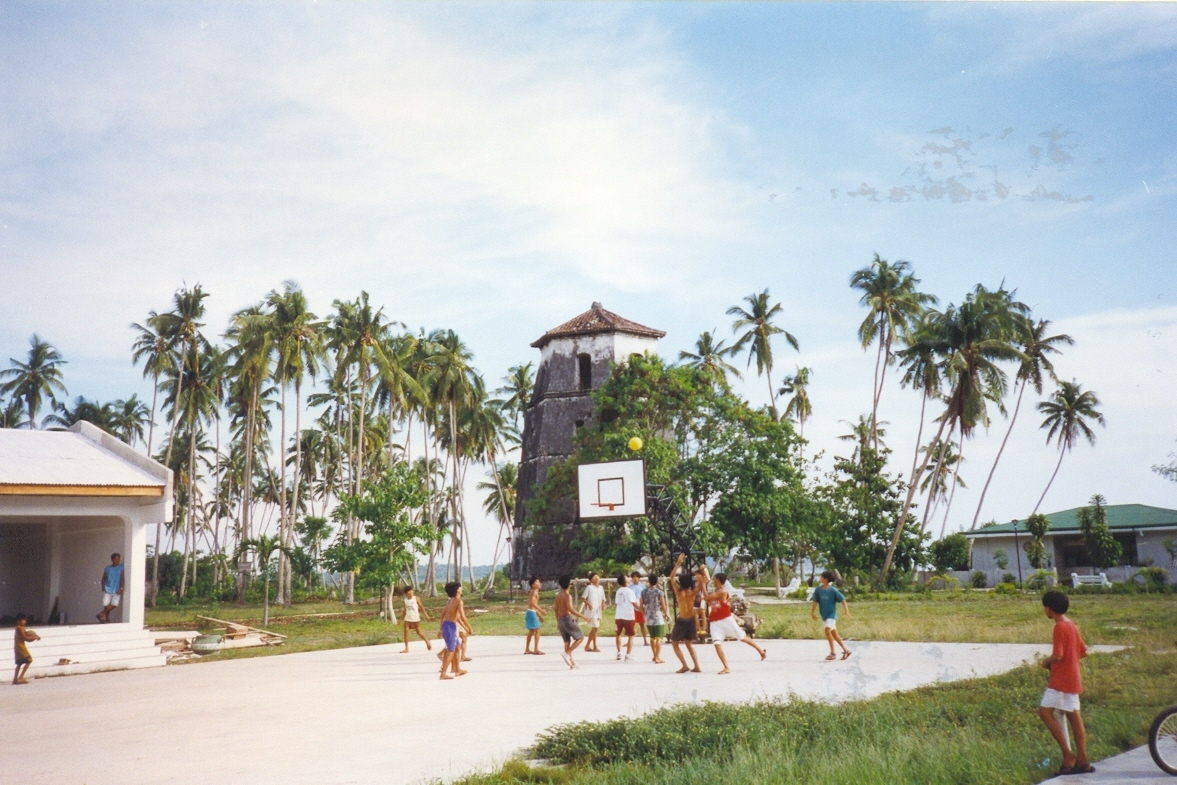
Rural children playing basketball

Sports in the Philippines is an important part of the country's culture.There are seven major sports in the Philippines: basketball, boxing, tennis, football, billiards, armwrestling and volleyball.

== Administration ==
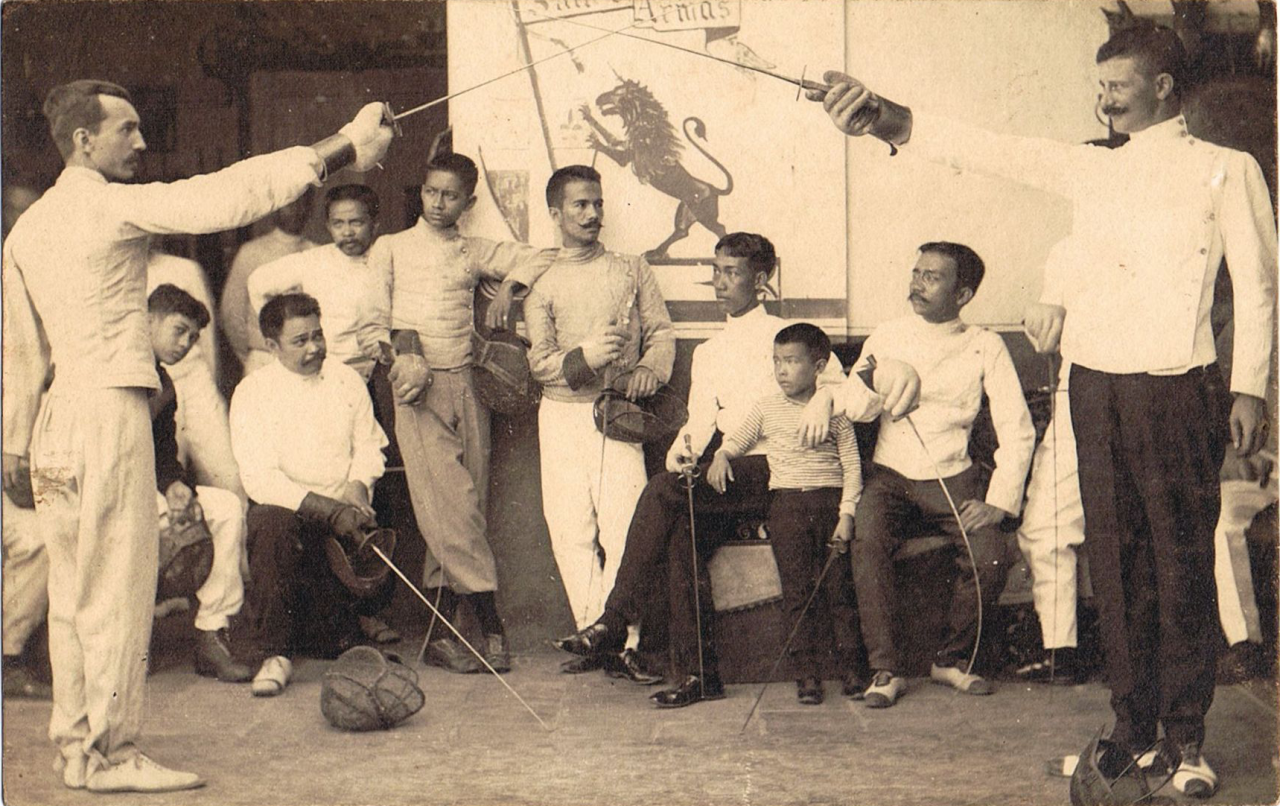
Filipino hero Antonio Luna (sitting, 2nd from left) teaching his students Fencing in his Sala de Armas, a fencing club he and his brother Juan Luna established in Sampaloc, Manila.

The governing agency for sports in the Philippines is the Philippine Sports Commission which was created in 1990 while the Games and Amusements Board is the government's regulatory body for professional sports in the country.

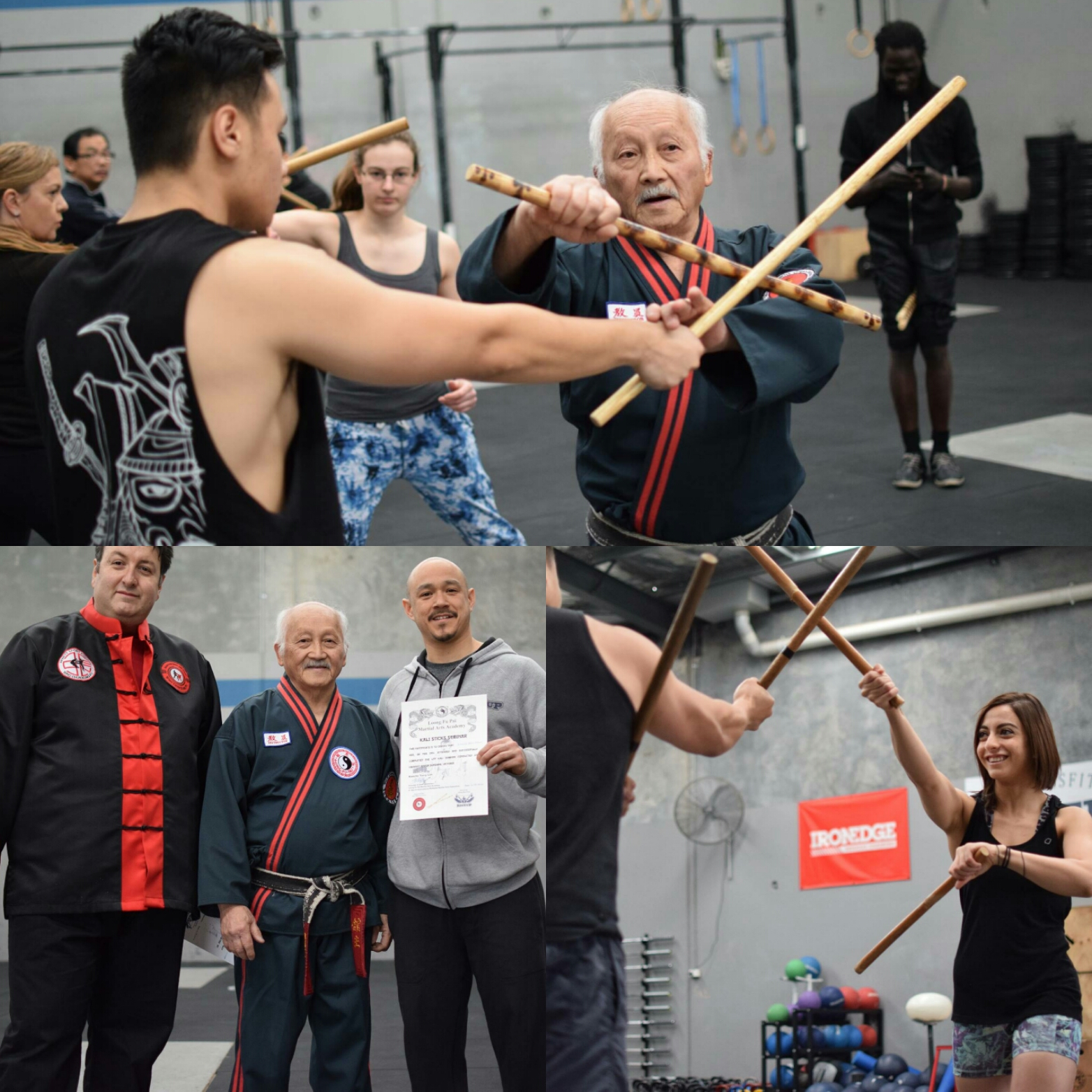
A demonstration of arnis, the national sport of the Philippines

The Philippine Olympic Committee (POC), a private entity is the sports body which represents the Philippines in international sports competition sanctioned by the International Olympic Committee including the Olympic Games. The POC was established in 1975, replacing the Philippine Amateur Athletic Federation which was founded in 1911. The POC's membership also includes national sports associations (NSAs), organizations which governs a specific sport or discipline in the country. The Philippine Paralympic Committee is the POC's counterpart in disabled sports and is a member of the International Paralympic Committee.

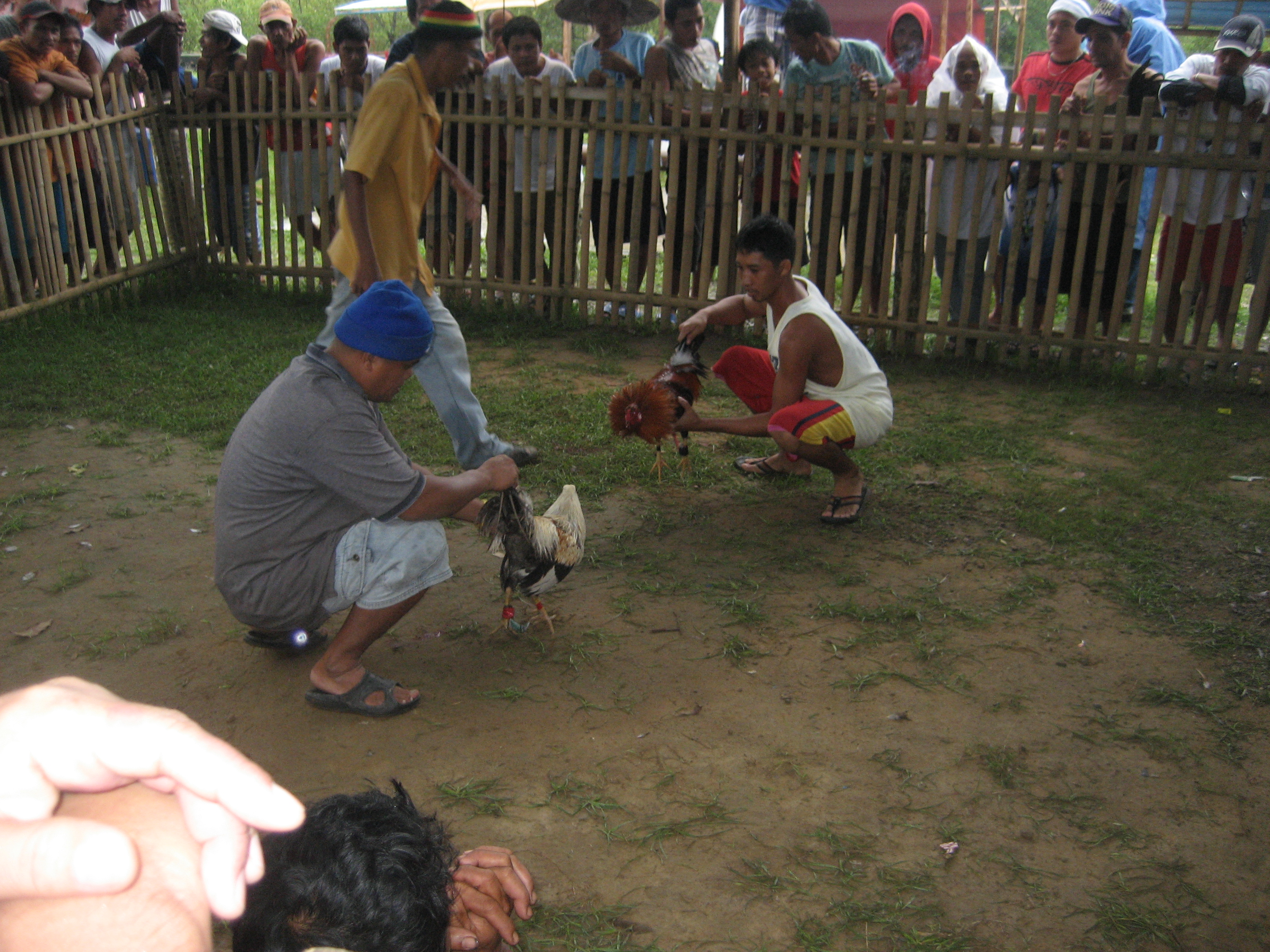
Cockfighting, one of the oldest form of Gambling in the Philippines.

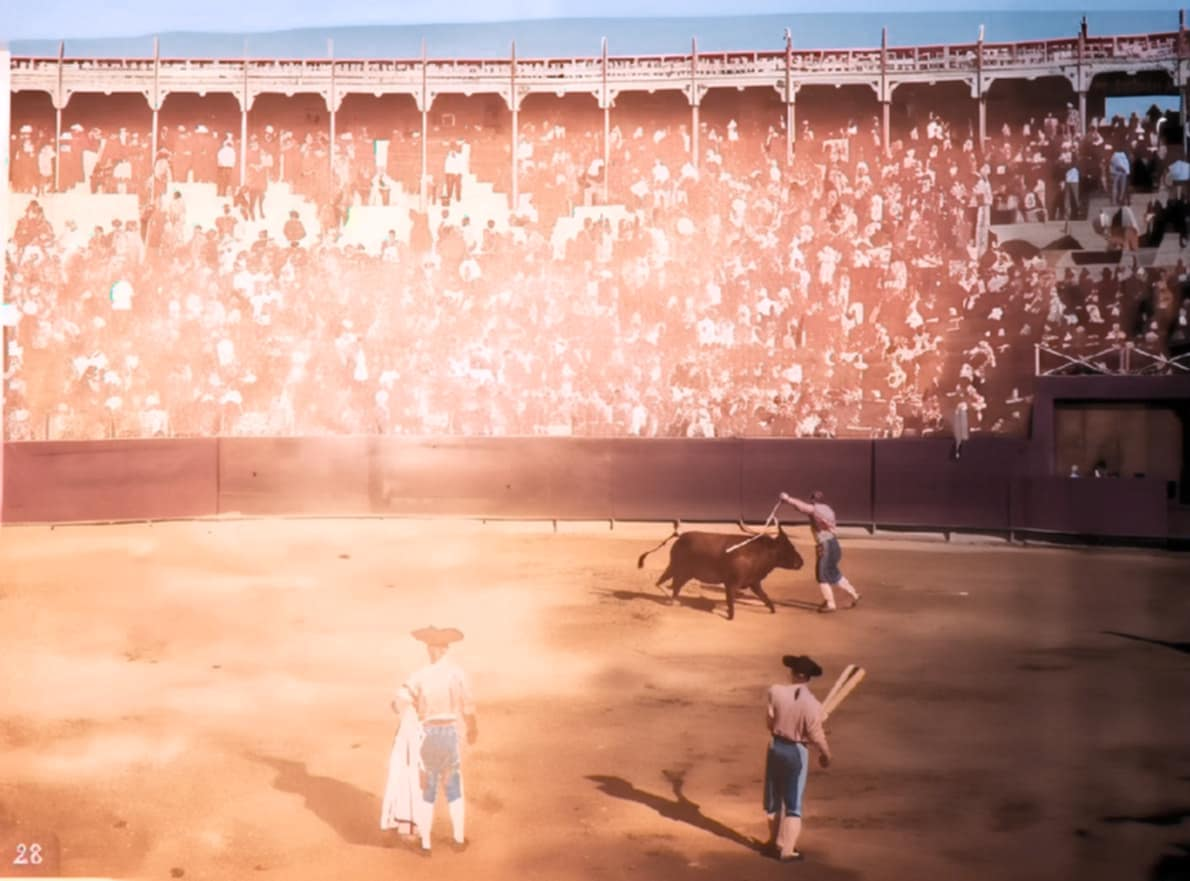
Bullfighting in Manila 1890's

There are also other alternative sporting bodies such as the Federation of School Sports Association of the Philippines which claims to be the sole governing body for university sports in the country and participates in International University Sports Federation (FISU) sanctioned tournaments.

== Summary by discipline ==
=== Traditional sports ===
The Philippines has numerous traditional sports that were popular before the colonial era and after the colonial era. Among these are archery, arnis, horse-riding, fling sports, wrestling sports, dart sports, track sports, and traditional martial arts.

With the sport of cockfighting being wildly popular in the Philippines, attracting large crowds who bet on the outcome of fights between the birds, and the sport itself a popular form of fertility worship among almost all Southeast Asians. Such sports activity as the sport of cockfighting, related to ritual forms of worship as practices and rituals of ancient worship intended for the blessings of the supernatural, as "in Indus Valley and other ancient civilizations, mother goddess had been invoked for fertility and prosperity" which included that religious cockfight lay as a prime example of "cultural synthesis of 'little' and 'great' cultures"

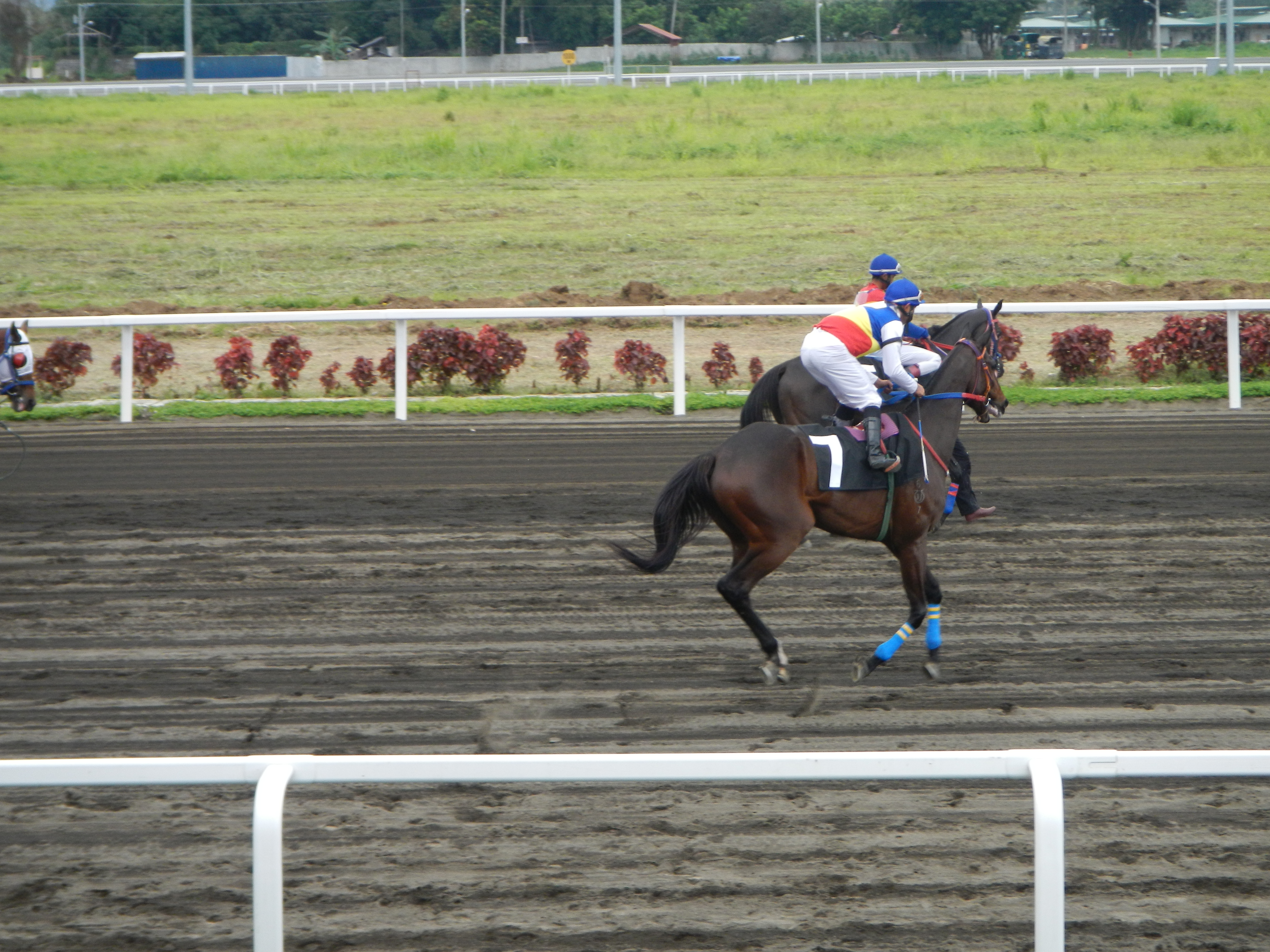
Horse racing in the Philippines

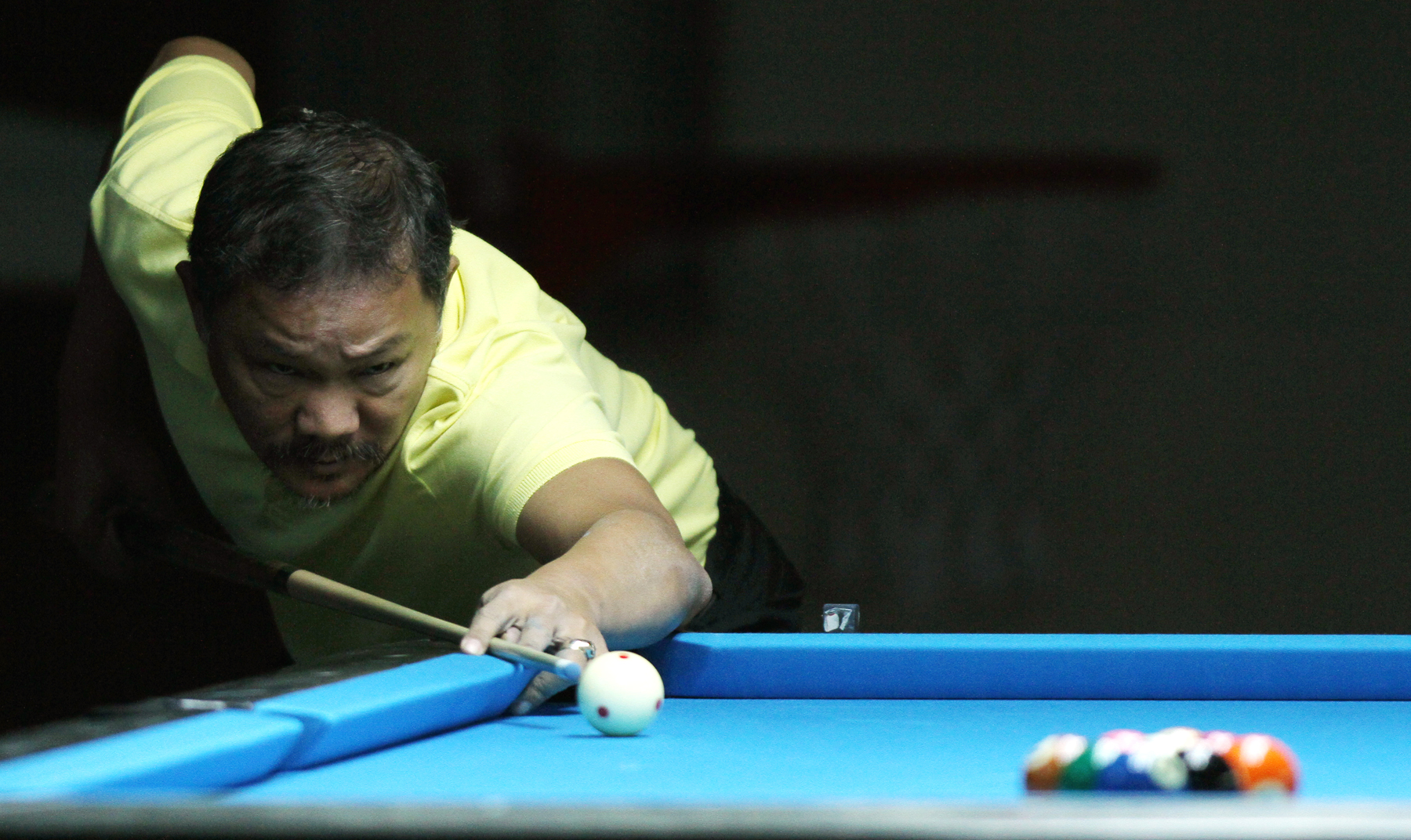
Efren "Bata" Reyes

Arnis is officially recognized as a national sport as per Republic Act No. 9850 of 2009.

=== Individual sports ===
==== Boxing ====
The Philippines has produced more than 40 boxing world champions such as Luisito Espinosa, Donnie Nietes, Gerry Peñalosa, and Johnriel Casimero.

Boxing is among the most popular individual sports in the Philippines. Some Filipino boxers such as Nonito Donaire, Gabriel Elorde, Pancho Villa and Manny Pacquiao are recognized internationally. The Amateur Boxing Association of the Philippines is the governing body for amateur boxing in the country.

The Association of Boxing Alliances in the Philippines (formerly Amateur Boxing Association of the Philippines) (ABAP) is the governing body of amateur boxing in the Philippines. The ABAP's current goal is for the country to win its first ever Olympic gold medal in boxing, to be recognized as one of the world's boxing powers as well as to improve the image of the Philippines abroad.

The country continually produces talented fighters, often in the junior featherweight division (122 pounds and below). The International Boxing Association sanctions amateur (Olympic-style) boxing matches which allows the national amateur boxing athletes of the Philippines to represent the country and compete in regional, continental and international matches and tournaments. The Philippines has currently two silver and three bronze Olympic medals.

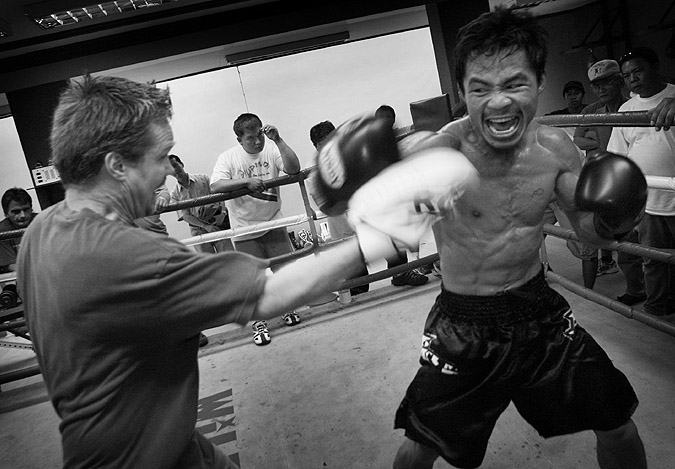
Manny Pacquiao

==== Figure skating ====
Ice skating rinks used as venues for figure skating are limited to shopping malls in the country, particularly in the Metro Manila area. The first ice skating rink in the country was opened in 1992 at SM Megamall in Mandaluyong. The first Olympic-sized ice skating rink was opened at the SM Mall of Asia in Pasay. An ice skating rink operated in SM Southmall in Las Piñas until 2022. There are more figure skating coaches in the Philippines than ice hockey coaches and the first Filipino ice skating coaches were roller skaters. The Philippine Championship is a national competitive for ice skating in which the winner gets to represent the country in international competitions. The Philippines has also managed to qualify and send a figure skater to the 2014 Winter Olympics, becoming the first Southeast Asian country to do so at the Winter Olympics. The said figure skater was Michael Christian Martinez.

=== Team sports ===
Sport	National team	Nickname
Baseball	Philippines national baseball team	The Dreamers
Baseball	Philippines women's national baseball team	None
Basketball	Philippines men's national basketball team	Gilas Pilipinas
Basketball	Philippines women's national basketball team	Gilas Pilipinas
Cricket	Philippines national cricket team	Carabaos
Cricket	Philippines women's national cricket team	None
Floorball	Philippines men's national floorball team	None
Floorball	Philippines women's national floorball team	None
Football	Philippines national football team	The Azkals
Football	Philippines women's national football team	The Filipinas
Ice hockey	Philippines men's national ice hockey team	None
Ice hockey	Philippines women's national ice hockey team	None
Rugby league	Philippines national rugby league team	Tamaraws
Rugby league	Philippines women's national rugby league team	Sampaguitas
Rugby sevens	Philippines national rugby sevens team	Volcanoes
Rugby sevens	Philippines women's national rugby sevens team	Volcanoes
Rugby union	Philippines national rugby union team	Volcanoes
Rugby union	Philippines women's national rugby union team	Volcanoes
Softball	Philippines men's national softball team	Blu Boys
Softball	Philippines women's national softball team	Blu Girls
Volleyball	Philippines men's national volleyball team	Alas Pilipinas
Volleyball	Philippines women's national volleyball team	Alas Pilipinas
Water polo	Philippines men's national water polo team	None
Water polo	Philippines women's national water polo team	None

==== Basketball ====
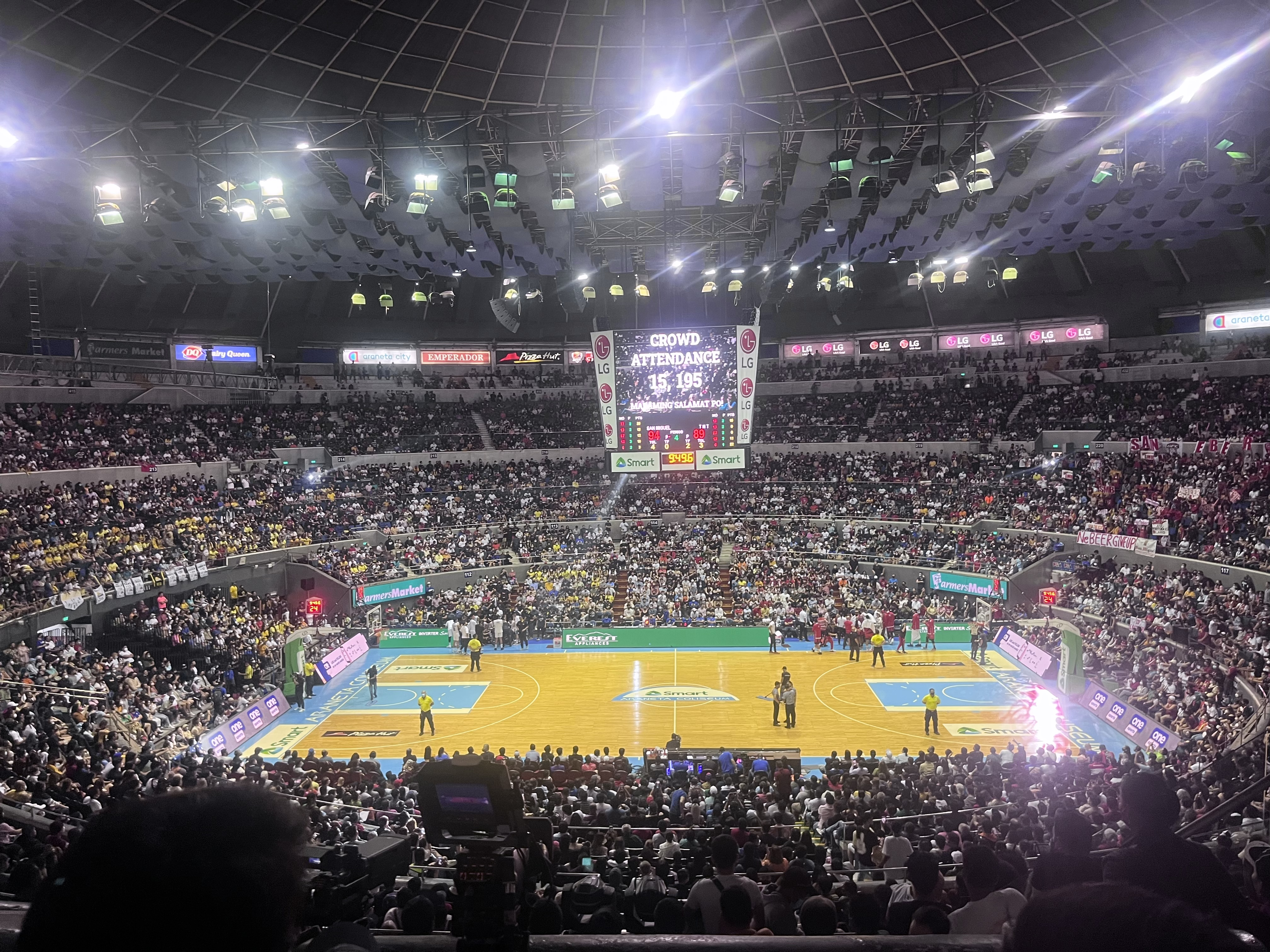
A finals 2022–23 PBA basketball game at the Smart Araneta Coliseum

Basketball was introduced in the country during the American colonial era and was one of the sports contested at the now defunct Far Eastern Championship Games. The men's national team has competed in the Summer Olympics making their debut in 1936 although they have been absent in the recent editions of the Games.They have also competed in the FIBA World Cup with the country hosting the tournament when it was still known as the FIBA World Championships in 1978.Their third-place finish in the 1954 edition was their best performance in the tournament. They hosted the 2023 edition with Japan and Indonesia.

The Philippine Basketball Association is the oldest league in Asia and is the top basketball league in the country. Other rival or smaller leagues in the country are organized. There are college basketball leagues and competitions such as the Philippine Collegiate Championship. Basketball matches of the University Athletic Association of the Philippines and the National Collegiate Athletic Association also receives attention.

The country also has a women's basketball team which has competed at the FIBA Asia Women's Championship, as well as men youth team's and 3x3 national teams. At the 2025 Southeast Asian Games in Bangkok, the Philippines women’s national basketball team (Gilas Women) won the gold medal in the women’s tournament, defeating host Thailand 73–70 in the final. The victory marked the Philippines’ third SEA Games women’s basketball title in four editions.

The Samahang Basketbol ng Pilipinas (Basketball Federation of the Philippines) is the national sport association of basketball in the Philippines.

==== Association football ====
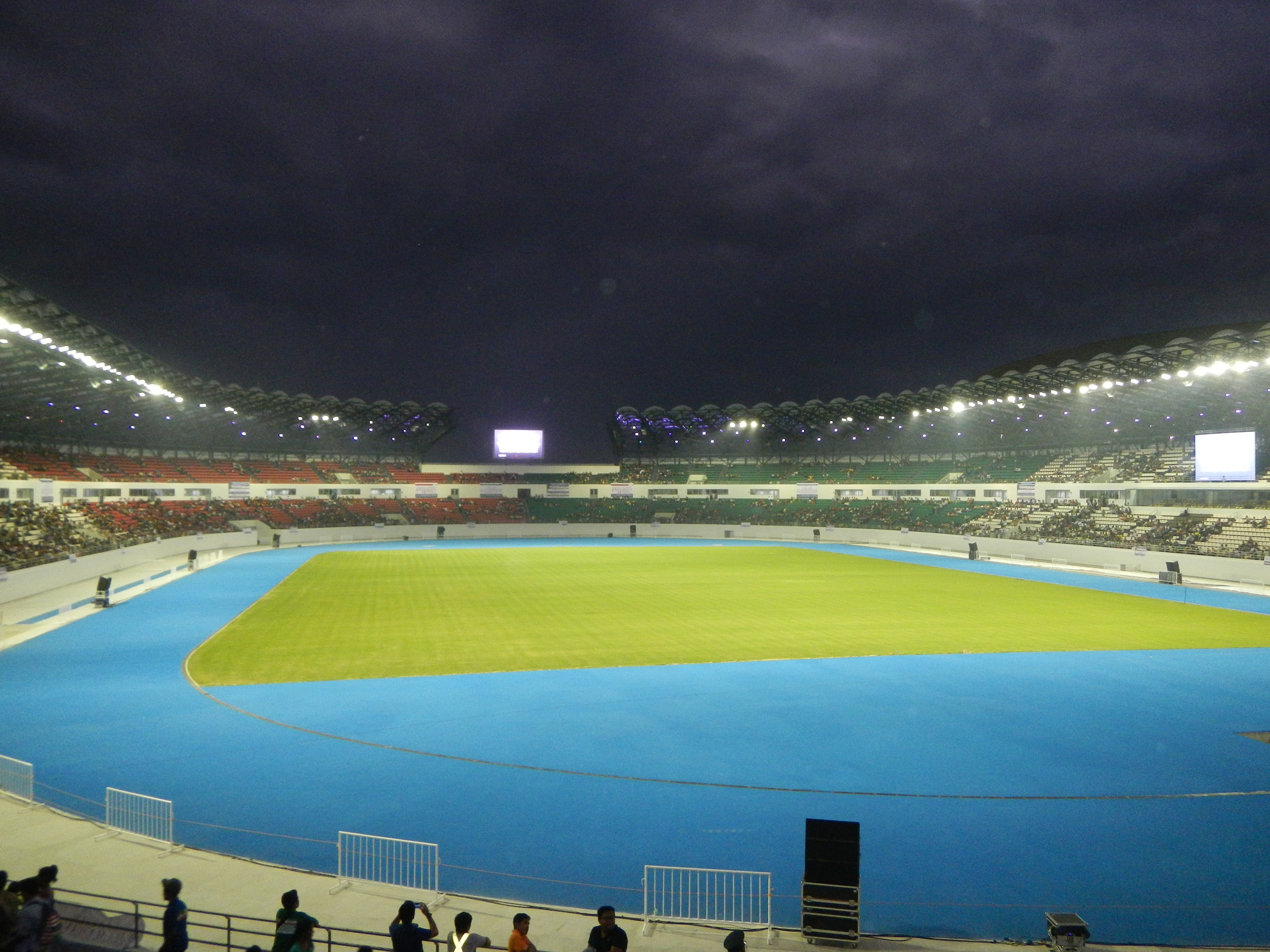
The Philippine Sports Stadium, the largest football stadium in the country

Football in the country dates back in the 1890s. The men's national team of the Philippines played their earlier matches prior to World War II against China and Japan at the Far Eastern Championship Games. They experience a decline after that period but has since recovered following their stint at the 2010 AFF Championship. The country also organizes a women's national team which has qualified for the FIFA Women's World Cup in 2023.

The Philippines Football League is the top flight football league in the country. Each club represents their respective cities or provinces. It also helps to promote football awareness and grassroots program to the young Filipino footballers who admire to play professional football.

The Philippine Football Federation is the governing body for football in the country.

==== Volleyball ====
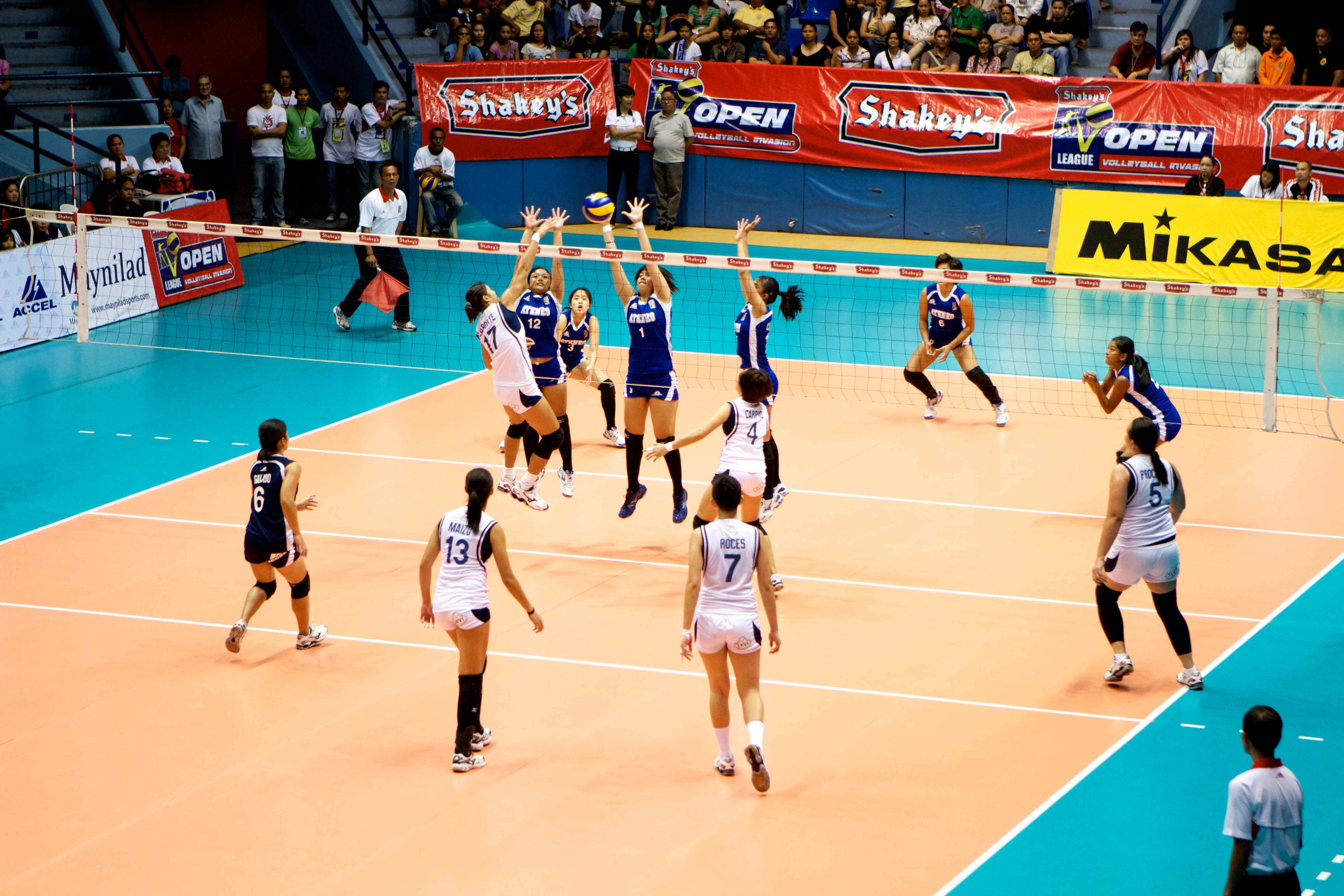
A women's volleyball match in the Shakey's V-League. (now Premier Volleyball League)

The NSA affiliated with the sport is called the Philippine National Volleyball Federation. Women's volleyball currently enjoys immense popularity primarily due to its growing fan base in the University Athletic Association of the Philippines and the National Collegiate Athletic Association amateur tournaments.

Internationally, competitors are given the opportunity to represent the country in tournaments such as the Southeast Asian Games as well as the Olympics.

The sport has also seen the development of leagues such as the Philippine Super Liga, Spikers' Turf and the Premier Volleyball League.

==== Baseball ====
Baseball was introduced in the Philippines by the Americans. The first baseball game in the Philippines was played in September 1898 weeks after the Battle of Manila, a match between Astor Battery led by George Wetlaufer and a regiment from the American Army. From 1899 to 1900, baseball clubs were established by local Filipinos. The sport's introduction aided the American colonial government's assimilation efforts. General Otis planned to eliminate local cockfighting through the introduction of the sport. A baseball league composing of six clubs was established. Then, Governor General William Howard Taft encouraged baseball in the archipelago. Baseball grew to be a popular sport in the country. The national team is Philippines national baseball team and the governing body is PABA.

== Sports leagues ==
The following are the main domestic leagues (or de facto top-flight leagues) in the Philippines.

League	Sport	Gender	No. of Teams
Professional Chess Association of the Philippines	Chess	Mixed	16
Philippine Basketball Association	Basketball	Men	12
Maharlika Pilipinas Basketball League	Basketball	Men	27
Women's Maharlika Pilipinas Basketball League	Basketball	Women	6
Mobile Legends: Bang Bang Professional League Philippines	Esports	Men	8
Philippines Football League	Football	Men	11
Premier Volleyball League	Volleyball	Women	9
Sharks Billiards Association	Nine-ball	Men	6

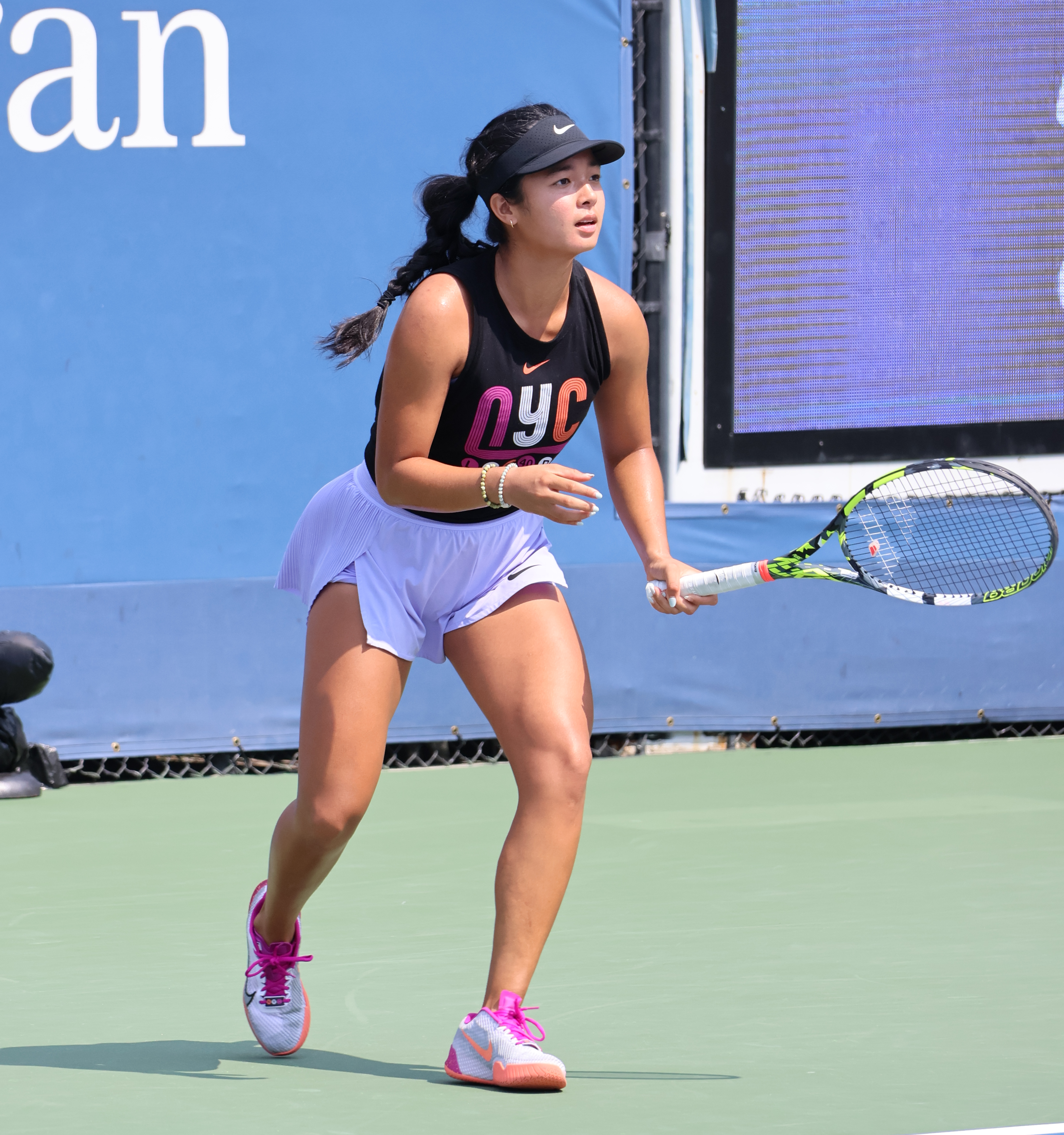
Tennis player Alexandra Eala

== International sports participation ==
=== Olympics and Paralympics ===
The Philippines has participated in all editions of the Olympics except in 1980 when it joined the American-led boycott of the 1980 Summer Olympics. The country is also the first tropical nation to participate at the Winter Olympics, debuting at the 1972 edition and has participated in three other edition of the winter games.

The Philippines has also participated in the Summer Paralympics although it has still to make its debut in the Winter Paralympics.

The country won its first Olympic gold medal at the 1988 Summer Olympics with Arianne Cerdeña in bowling. However, since bowling was demonstration sport, it did not count in the official tally. The first official gold medal for the Philippines came from the 2020 Summer Olympics through weightlifter Hidilyn Diaz. Gymnast Carlos Yulo became the country's first multi-Olympic champion after winning two gold medals at the 2024 Summer Olympics.

All time medal count, Global Sports Competition
Event	Appearances	Gold	Silver	Bronze	Total	Rank
Summer Olympic Games	24	3	5	10	18	84th
Winter Olympic Games	5	0	0	0	0	-
Summer Paralympic Games	7	0	0	2	2	117th
Summer Youth Olympic Games	3	0	1	0	1	100th
Winter Youth Olympic Games	2	0	0	0	0	-
World Games	12	2	7	7	16	64rd
Deaflympics	3	0	0	0	0	-
Summer World University Games	10	2	3	1	6	76th
Winter World University Games	3	0	0	0	0	-

All time medal count, Regional Sports Competition
Event	Appearances	Gold	Silver	Bronze	Total	Rank
Asian Games	19	71	116	241	428	12th
Asian Winter Games	5	1	0	0	0	8th
Asian Para Games	4	20	21	24	65	14th
Asian Beach Games	5	5	10	32	47	22nd
Asian Indoor and Martial Arts Games	7	8	26	35	69	18th
Afro-Asian Games	1	1	4	10	15	15th
Asian Youth Para Games	3	2	7	8	17	24th
Southeast Asian Games	24	1,180	1,346	1,703	4,229	5th
ASEAN Para Games	12	208	248	307	763	6th
ASEAN University Games	-	-	-	-	-	-
ASEAN School Games	10	41	43	105	189	6th

== Domestic multi-sport competitions ==
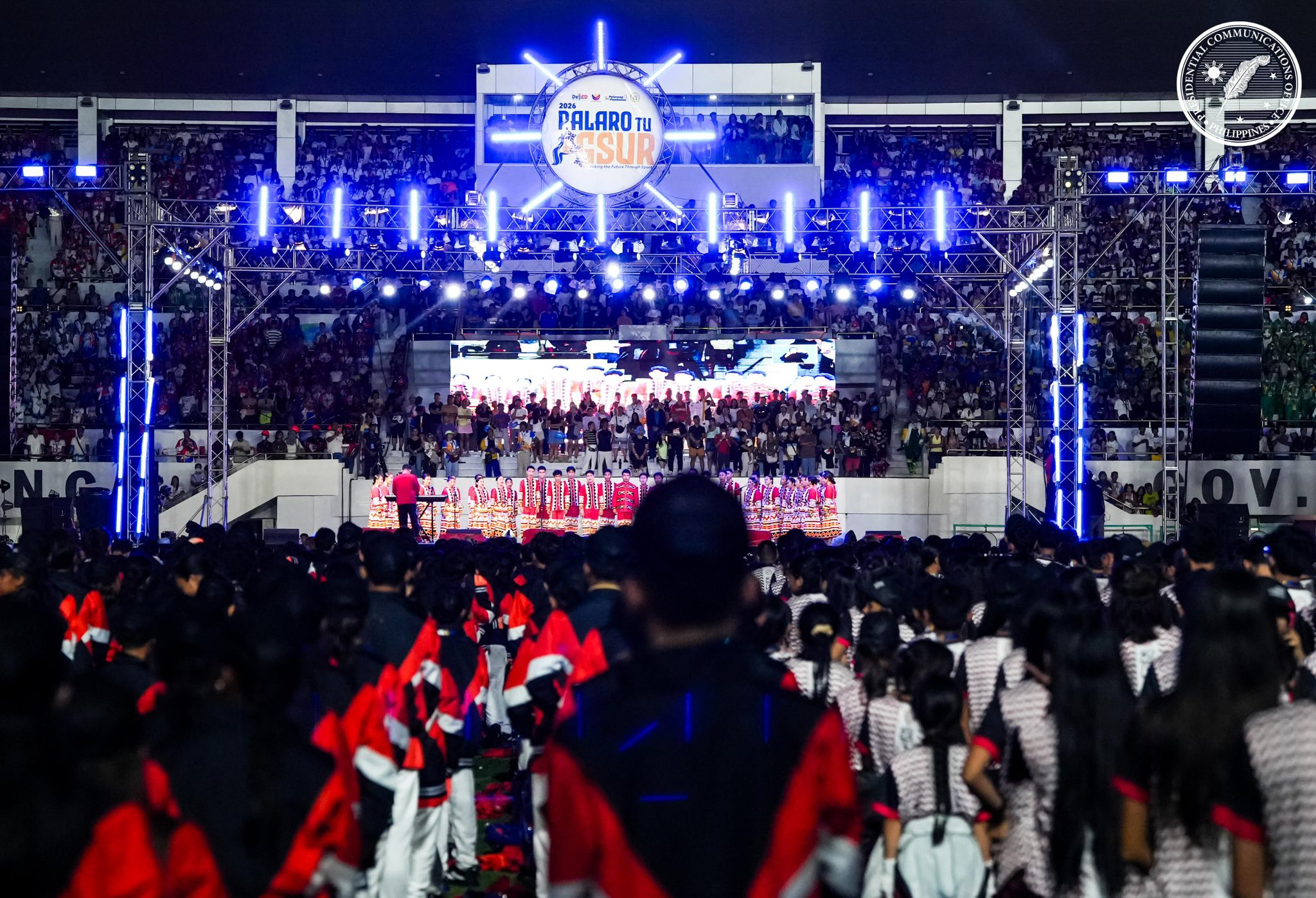
2026 Palarong Pambansa opening ceremony.

The Philippine government organizes multiple national games.

- Philippine National Games – open national games sanctioned by the Philippine Sports Commission
- Palarong Pambansa – national games for student-athletes under the Department of Education
- Batang Pinoy (Philippine Youth Games) – national games for youth, 15 years and under.

== Athletics ==
- Alice Cusay Babiera (1973-1974) - Won gold medals in 400m, 800m, and 1500m at the Palarong Pambansa; one of the pioneering female middle-distance runners in the Philippines.

== See also ==
- Department of Sports (Philippines)
- Philippines at the Southeast Asian Games
- Project Gintong Alay
- Bodybuilding in the Philippines
- Esports in the Philippines
- Futsal in the Philippines
- 3x3 basketball in the Philippines
- Ice hockey in the Philippines
