= Bodybuilding in the Philippines =

Bodybuilding in the Philippines refers to the bodybuilding sport practiced by Filipino bodybuilders in the Philippines to be able to compete in local and international bodybuilding competitions. According to Filipino sports reporter Bill Velasco of The Philippine Star newspaper, the Philippines has a "long-standing history of bringing glory to the Philippines".

== Notable Filipino bodybuilders ==
Notable pioneering Filipino bodybuilders include:

=== Arsenio "Boy" Agpoon ===
He is also an actor/stuntman who appeared in several films(much like action movies) in the late 90's and early 2000's as a goon or henchmen.

=== Tomas “Tom” M. Ortega ===
Founder of the Philippine Bodybuilder Federation. He served as the president of PBF for several years, collaborating with Ben Weider in establishing Mr. Olympia. He created the “Systomor” workout system-promoting bodybuilding in Philippines.

=== Manuel "Manny" A. Cabigas ===
Manuel Arce Cabigas was a 7 time Mr. Philippines and Mr Universe most promising body builder. He also serve in the United States Naval Special Warfare.

=== Stan Carbungco ===
Stan Carbungco was a former Mr. Philippines in the local bodybuilding contest and a former president of Bodybuilding Sport. After his competing days in the field of bodybuilding, Carbungco became the first manufacturer of weight training equipment in the Philippines.(Velasco) Carbungco died on March 10, ??? when he was 80 years old.

=== Roland Dantes ===
Roland Dantes was a third runner-up competitor during the 1969 Mr. Universe competition, the year when he competed against Arnold Schwarzenegger. After the competition, Dantes went on to become an actor in local and international cinematic films. He appeared as an antagonist in a Tagalog film title Durugin si Totoy Bato (literally "Knock Totoy Bato Down"), a classic movie by Fernando Poe, Jr. about the sport of boxing.

=== Roman Cortuna ===
Roman "Dondon" Cortuna won the world championship in bodybuilding to become Mr. Universe two years in a row. Cortuna first won in 2008. He won again in 2009.

=== Luzviminda McClinton ===
Filipino female bodybuilder Luzviminda McClinton won the FAME World Championship competition in 2010.

== See also ==
- Sports in the Philippines
- Sports in Asia
- Sports in Central Asia
