= 3x3 basketball in the Philippines =

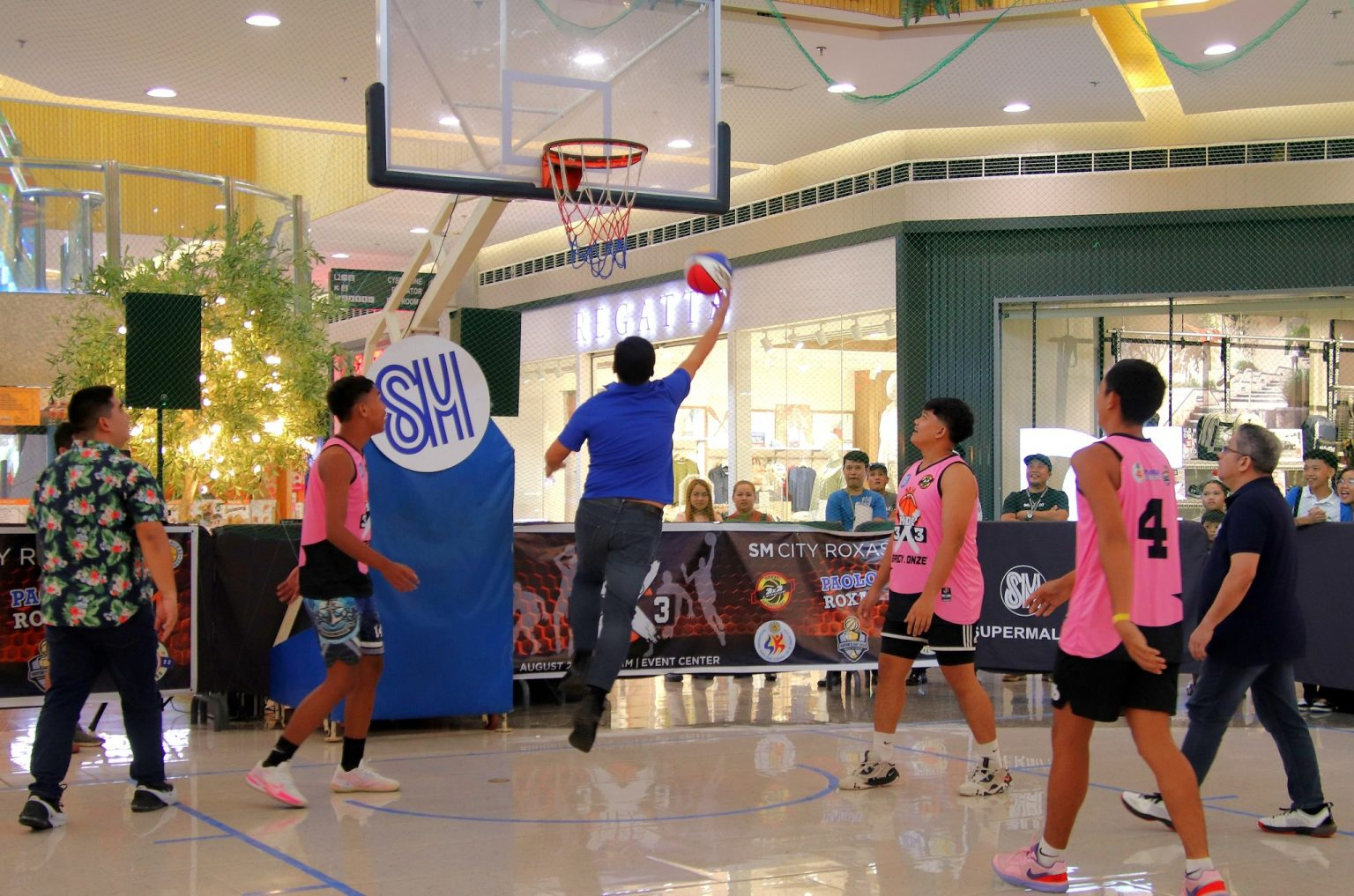
- 3x3 tournament in a shopping mall in Roxas City
- Country: Philippines
- Governing body: Samahang Basketbol ng Pilipinas (lit. 'Basketball Federation of the Philippines')
- National team: Men's national team Women's national team
- Nickname: Tatluhan

Club competitions
- Chooks-to-Go Pilipinas 3x3 (2019–2023); PBA 3x3 (2021–2024); Women's PBA 3x3 (2015–2016, 2023–2024)

International competitions
- FIBA 3x3 World Cup; FIBA 3x3 Pro Circuit (club); FIBA 3x3 Asia Cup; SEA Games

3x3 basketball is among the sports played in the Philippines. Locally known as the tatluhan, the Samahang Basketbol ng Pilipinas sanctions the conduct of formal 3x3 basketball events in the country.

== History ==
=== Early years ===
The 3x3 variant of basketball has long been played in the Philippines and has been colloquially known as tatluhan as early as the 1990s.

The Samahang Basketbol ng Pilipinas (SBP), the national federation for basketball in the country is responsible in promoting 3x3 in the early years of its formal adoption by FIBA. The Philippines' national men's team took part at the 2007 Asian Indoor Games when 3x3 basketball was a demonstration sport.

The first national 3x3 team was fielded in a global competition was at the 2010 Summer Youth Olympics. The SBP claimed that FIBA has designated the Philippines as a model for holding 3x3 events.

The SBP hosted in 2013 and 2014 the Asia-Pacific legs of the FIBA 3x3 World Tour and handled teams such as Manila West and Manila North.

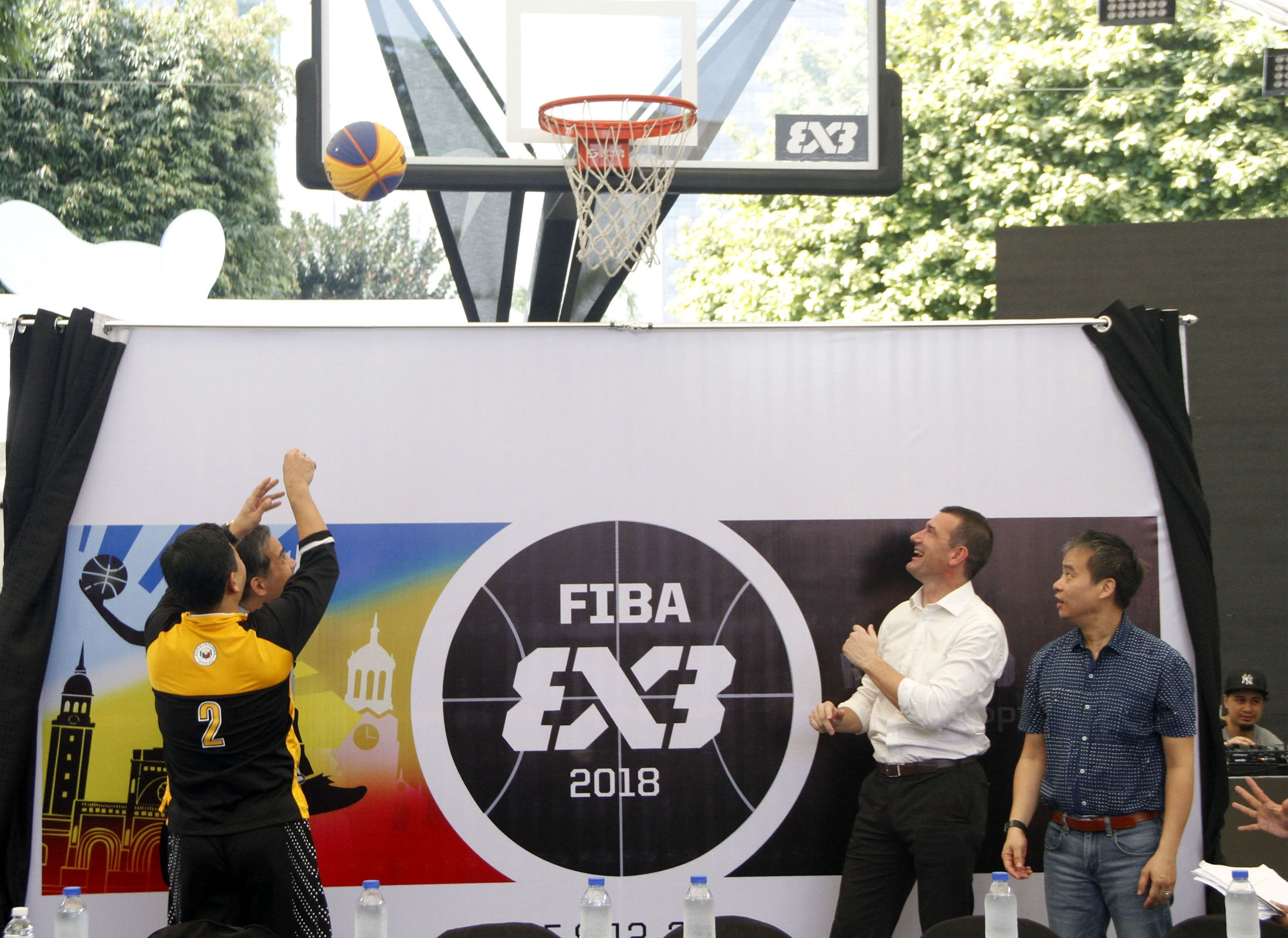
Official launch of the 2018 FIBA 3x3 World Cup at Bonifacio Global City. 18 January 2018.

The Philippines later hosted the 2018 FIBA 3x3 World Cup for both men and women at the Philippine Arena in Bocaue.

=== Chooks-to-Go and PBA 3x3 era ===
Chooks-to-Go became a sponsor of 3x3 basketball in the Philippines. In 2019, it organized the Chooks-to-Go Pilipinas 3x3 league as well as frequently hosted FIBA 3x3 Pro Circuit tournaments and fielded 3x3 teams in those. 3x3 tournaments in the Philippines were often organized in shopping malls.

The 2019 SEA Games saw the Philippines introducing 3x3 basketball for the first time.

In November 2021, the Philippine Basketball Association organized its league – the PBA 3x3.

Chooks-to-Go ended its 3x3 program and its league in November 2023. The PBA 3x3 followed suit in May 2024.

=== 2024 onwards ===
In May 2025, the SBP and MelMac Sports held a friendly tournament as part of a soft launch of Pilipinas 3x3. However the full launch of the new 3x3 league has yet to occur.

Both the Philippine men's and women's 3x3 failed to medal at the 2025 SEA Games in Thailand – the first time that both teams did so in a single edition since 3x3's introduction in 2019. The failure caused the SBP to issue a statement that it is looking to overhaul the 3x3 program citing the disbandment of the PBA 3x3 as reasons for the dismal finish.

== Leagues ==
- Chooks-to-Go Pilipinas 3x3
- PBA 3x3
- Women's PBA 3x3
