= Sports in Central Asia =

The area of Central Asia has a wide variety of sports, many of which have close cultural ties to the countries involved.

== International Sports ==
=== Football ===
Football, the world's most popular sport, is played in the majority of countries in Central Asia. The Asian Football Confederation or AFC is the governing body of association football in Asia, similar to UEFA in Europe and FIFA worldwide.

The following countries all have organisations affiliated to the AFC:

- Afghanistan
- Iran
- Kyrgyzstan
- Tajikistan
- Turkmenistan
- Uzbekistan
- Mongolia is considered "East Asia" on the Asian Football Confederation's website

== Domestic Sports ==
=== Wrestling ===
Though wrestling is an international and Olympic sport, there are many different variations in Central Asia. Mongolian wrestling has been practised in the country for many centuries. Khuresh is a form of wrestling that is popular in the region of Tuva in Siberia.
