= List of Forged in Fire episodes =

Forged in Fire is an American reality television competition series that has aired on the History channel since its season one premiere episode on June 22, 2015 and is produced by Outpost Entertainment.

The program places four competitors in three elimination rounds to forge bladed weapons. Each weapon is tested and evaluated by a panel of three (sometimes four) judges. As the host for seasons one through seven, Wil Willis introduced the parameters for each episode. Grady Powell replaced Willis for season eight onward. The main judges include Historic Weapons Re-creation Specialist David Baker, Edged Weapon Specialist Doug Marcaida, American Bladesmith Society (ABS) Master Bladesmith James Neilson, and two-time Forged in Fire champion Ben Abbott.

Neilson missed most of season three due to hand surgery. ABS Master Bladesmith Jason Knight filled in for him from episode three of that season through episode seven of season four. Neilson briefly returned for the first episode of season four (a special with Knight, Baker, and Marcaida) before returning for good in episode eight until Abbott took over for the final three episodes. Since then, Neilson and Abbott have shared judging duties into season eight. Also during season four, Marcaida injured his right rotator cuff while testing a weapon. Marcaida's younger brother RJ and Kali students filled in for weapons testing while he recovered from the injury.

== Series overview ==
Season	Episodes	Originally released		
Season	Episodes	First released	Last released	Network
1	8	June 22, 2015	August 10, 2015	History
2	10	February 16, 2016	April 19, 2016	History
3	16	August 23, 2016	February 14, 2017	History
4	23	April 11, 2017	October 31, 2017	History
5	40	March 7, 2018	December 19, 2018	History
6	30	February 6, 2019	September 25, 2019	History
7	37	October 9, 2019	August 19, 2020	History
8	46	November 18, 2020	February 2, 2022	History
9	26	March 30, 2022	November 2, 2022	History
10	17	October 4, 2023	November 21, 2024	History
11	8	August 6, 2025	September 24, 2025	History
Specials	19	March 28, 2017	June 15, 2022	History

== Episodes ==
Legend
Color / Symbol	Description
1. name	A contestant's name preceded by the numeral 1 signifies the **winner**.
2. name	A contestant's name preceded by the numeral 2 signifies **2nd place**.
3. name	A contestant's name preceded by the numeral 3 signifies **3rd place**.
4. name	A contestant's name preceded by the numeral 4 signifies **4th place**.
5. name	A contestant's name preceded by the numeral 5 signifies **5th place**.
6. name	A contestant's name preceded by the numeral 6 signifies **6th place**.
7. name	A contestant's name preceded by the numeral 7 signifies **7th place**.
(S## E##)	The "S##" and "E##" (**season and episode numbers**, respectively) in parentheses showcases the contestant's previous appearance(s) on the show.
#.〈name〉	A contestant's name in angled brackets denotes that person being **medically released**.
#. **name**	A name in bold denotes a **competing Judge** within a particular episode.

=== Season 1 (2015) ===
No. in series	No. in season	Title	First weapon	Final weapon	Original release date	U.S. viewers (millions)
1	1	"Japanese Katana"	Signature blade (using a bar of high-carbon steel)	Katana	June 22, 2015	1.16
Judges: J. Neilson, David Baker, Doug Marcaida Results: 1. Matthew Parkinson 2. Rich Greenwood 3. Billy Helton 4. Joe Waites
2	2	"Chakram"	Signature blade (using choice of a variety of metal objects)	Chakram	June 29, 2015	1.19
Judges: J. Neilson, David Baker, Doug Marcaida Results: 1. Chris Farrell 2. Trenton Tye 3. Grant Marcoux 4. Chad Harding
3	3	"Viking Battle Axe"	Signature blade (using high-carbon steel train coil spring)	Viking battle axe	July 6, 2015	1.30
Judges: J. Neilson, David Baker, Doug Marcaida Results: 1. Ryu Lim 2. Jonathan Porter 3. Phil Evans 4. James Huse
4	4	"Katar"	Signature blade (using bars of high-carbon steel and the Hada technique)	Katar	July 13, 2015	1.33
Judges: J. Neilson, David Baker, Doug Marcaida Results: 1. David Goldberg 2. Jaime L. Vining 3. Jimmy Seymour 4. Arnon Andrey Kartmazov
5	5	"Crusader Sword"	Signature blade (using a block of W2 steel)	Crusader sword	July 20, 2015	1.53
Judges: J. Neilson, David Baker, Doug Marcaida Results: 1. Peter Swarz-Burt 2. David Roeder 3. Matt Venier 4. Gabriel Bell
6	6	"The Elizabethan Rapier"	Signature blade (using canister Damascus)	Elizabethan Rapier	July 27, 2015	1.32
Judges: J. Neilson, David Baker, Doug Marcaida Results: 1. Guy Harris 2. Peter Martin 3. Peter 'Cowboy' Szymanski 4. JD Smith
7	7	"The Roman Gladius"	Signature blade (using high-carbon chromium steel ball bearing)	Roman gladius	August 3, 2015	1.37
Judges: J. Neilson, David Baker, Doug Marcaida Results: 1. Jamie Lundell 2. Mareko Maumasi 3. Maxon McCarter 4. Adam Ison
8	8	"The Moro Kris"	Signature blade (using variety of items and materials)	Moro kris	August 10, 2015	1.60
Judges: J. Neilson, David Baker, Doug Marcaida Results: 1. Mace Vitale 2. Murray Carter 3. Ray Kirk 4. Jason Morrissey

=== Season 2 (2016) ===
No. in series	No. in season	Title	First weapon	Final weapon	Original release date	U.S. viewers (millions)
9	1	"The War Hammer"	Signature blade (using metal from a crate of random metals)	War hammer	February 16, 2016	1.16
Judges: J. Neilson, David Baker, Doug Marcaida: Note: Kim is the show's first female contestant.; Results: 1. Craig Camerer 2. Jeff Bridgers 3. Kim Stahl 4. Harry Harkins
10	2	"Khopesh"	Signature blade (using cable steel)	Khopesh	February 23, 2016	1.06
Judges: J. Neilson, David Baker, Doug Marcaida Results: 1. Salem Straub 2. Craig Trnka 3. Chris Marks 4. Zack Jonas
11	3	"The Scottish Claymore"	Signature blade (using a coal forge)	Scottish claymore	March 1, 2016	1.00
Judges: J. Neilson, David Baker, Doug Marcaida Results: 1. Scott Thomas 2. Jonathan Wick 3. Erin Simmons 4. Earl Blackmore
12	4	"Spiked Shield"	Signature blade (using choice of 3 different metals from a pile of common metal items)	Spiked shield	March 8, 2016	1.11
Judges: J. Neilson, David Baker, Doug Marcaida Results: 1. Ilya Alekseyev 2. Michael Coffey 3. Tim Hintsala 4. John Gruber
13	5	"Viking Sword"	Signature blade (using car metal)	Viking sword	March 15, 2016	1.20
Judges: J. Neilson, David Baker, Doug Marcaida Results: 1. Travis Wuertz 2. Morgan Medlen 3. Tom Ward 4. Mardi Meshejian
14	6	"Nepalese Kukri"	Signature blade (using four types of metal)	Nepalese kukri	March 22, 2016	1.24
Judges: J. Neilson, David Baker, Doug Marcaida Results: 1. Jason Redick 2. Josh Weston 3. Kelly Potter 4. Jason Ritchie
15	7	"The Shotel"	Signature blade (using high carbon steel and wrought iron)	Shotel	March 29, 2016	1.17
Judges: J. Neilson, David Baker, Doug Marcaida Results: 1. Burt Foster 2. Chad Osborne 3. Kevin Klein 4. Erin Aylor
16	8	"The Cutlass"	Signature blade (using last season's failed blades)	Cutlass	April 5, 2016	1.01
Judges: J. Neilson, David Baker, Doug Marcaida Results: 1. Tobin Nieto 2. Ron Mezile 3. Bob Brandel 4. Kyle Gahagan
17	9	"The Khanda"	Signature blade (using salvaged material from a "welded pile" of various metals)	Khanda	April 12, 2016	1.23
Judges: J. Neilson, David Baker, Doug Marcaida Results: 1. Ben Abbott 2. Tom McGinnis 3. Brent Stubblefield 4. Nathan Zimmerman
18	10	"The Tabar"	Signature blade (using lawnmower metal)	Tabar	April 19, 2016	1.18
Judges: J. Neilson, David Baker, Doug Marcaida Results: 1. Ted Thompson 2. Rob "Deker" Dekelbaum 3. Robert Burns 4. Edward Kim

=== Season 3 (2016–2017) ===
No. in series	No. in season	Title	First weapon	Final weapon	Original release date	U.S. viewers (millions)
19	1	"Champions Edition"	Signature blade	Scottish claymore	August 23, 2016	1.23
Judges: J. Neilson, David Baker, Doug Marcaida These four contestants, all champions from previous seasons, were invited to compete again. The winner received an additional $10,000 and the title "Champion of Champions". Results: 1. Ben Abbott (S2 E9) 2. Matthew Parkinson (S1 E1) 3. Salem Straub (S2 E2) 4. Burt Foster (S2 E7)
20	2	"Fan Favorites"	Signature blade	Hook sword	August 30, 2016	1.12
Judges: J. Neilson, David Baker, Doug Marcaida These four contestants from previous seasons were invited to compete again based on fans' reaction to their initial performance. Results: 1. David Roeder (S1 E5) 2. Rich Greenwood (S1 E1) 3. Kelly Potter (S2 E6) 4. Ryu Lim (S1 E3)
21	3	"Butterfly Swords"	Signature blade (using metal from tools)	Butterfly sword	September 6, 2016	1.07
Judges: Jason Knight, David Baker, Doug Marcaida Results: 1. Shayne Carter 2. Andy Alm 3. Harry Burdett 4. Michael Allenson (né Hoopes)
22	4	"The Falcata"	Signature blade (using high carbon steel and forge hammers)	Falcata	September 13, 2016	1.22
Judges: Jason Knight, David Baker, Doug Marcaida Kelly Vermeer-Vella was the first woman to win her episode. Results: 1. Kelly Vermeer-Vella 2. Justin Jones 3. Will Bagley 4. Frank Christensen
23	5	"Kora Sword"	Signature blade (using steel from power tools)	Kora sword	September 20, 2016	1.10
Judges: Jason Knight, David Baker, Doug Marcaida Results: 1. Liam Hoffman 2. Josh Smith 3. Paul Happy 4. Robby Bowman
24	6	"Hunga Munga"	Serrated blade	Hunga munga	September 27, 2016	1.17
Judges: Jason Knight, David Baker, Doug Marcaida Results: 1. Jared Williams 2. Eric Anthony Leong 3. Ryan Lewis 4. Harlan Whitman
25	7	"The Boar Spear"	Signature blade (using a suit of armor)	Boar spear	October 4, 2016	1.23
Judges: Jason Knight, David Baker, Doug Marcaida Results: 1. Allen Newberry 2. Clayton Cowart 3. Mike Shindel 4. Chase Wilder
26	8	"Xiphos Sword"	Signature blade (using metal from construction equipment)	Xiphos sword	October 11, 2016	1.34
Judges: Jason Knight, David Baker, Doug Marcaida Results: 1. Keith Hill 2. Jon Maynard 3. Sam Rutherford 4. Riley Butz
27	9	"The Pandat"	Signature blade (using junkyard-salvaged steel and a coal forge)	Pandat	October 18, 2016	1.19
Judges: Jason Knight, David Baker, Doug Marcaida Results: 1. Pete Winkler 2. Jo Smith 3. Brandon Brink 4. April Franklin
28	10	"Zulu Iklwa"	Bayonet	Zulu iklwa	October 25, 2016	1.09
Judges: Jason Knight, David Baker, Doug Marcaida Results: 1. Matthew Moline 2. Lyle Wynn 3. Scott Mcreynolds 4. Clarence Jackson
29	11	"The Pata: Champions Edition"	Signature blade (using canoe Damascus steel)	Pata	January 10, 2017	1.59
Judges: Jason Knight, David Baker, Doug Marcaida These four contestants, all champions from previous seasons, were invited to compete again. The winner received an additional $10,000 and the title "Champion of Champions". Results: 1. Travis Wuertz (S2 E5) 2. Shayne Carter (S3 E3) 3. Peter Swarz-Burt (S1 E5) 4. Scott Thomas (S2 E3)
30	12	"The Zweihänder"	Friction folder (using cube steel)	Zweihänder	January 17, 2017	1.49
Judges: Jason Knight, David Baker, Doug Marcaida Results: 1. Jay Replogle 2. Stephan Fowler 3. Harry Black 4. Emiliano Carrillo
31	13	"Cavalry Saber"	Signature blade (using gun barrel metal)	Cavalry saber	January 24, 2017	1.56
Judges: Jason Knight, David Baker, Doug Marcaida Results: 1. David Mooneyham 2. Todd Bitler 3. Jason Glenn Howell 4. Nic Hanlon
32	14	"The Naginata"	Signature blade	Naginata	January 31, 2017	1.70
Judges: Jason Knight, David Baker, Doug Marcaida Results: 1. Theo Nazz 2. Joe Collett 3. Walter Sorrells 4. Erich Ouellette
33	15	"The Haladie"	Hatchet (using high carbon steel)	Haladie	February 7, 2017	1.69
Judges: Jason Knight, David Baker, Doug Marcaida Results: 1. Raymond Smith 2. Stephen Williamson 3. Jason Kraus 4. Adlai Stein
34	16	"Redemption"	Signature blade	Viking sword	February 14, 2017	1.63
Judges: Jason Knight, David Baker, Doug Marcaida This episode featured contestants eliminated from previous episodes returning for a chance at redemption. Results: 1. Gabriel Bell (S1 E5) 2. Clarence Jackson (S3 E10) 3. JD Smith (S1 E6) 4. Brandon Brink (S3 E9)

=== Season 4 (2017) ===
No. in series	No. in season	Title	First weapon	Final weapon	Original release date	U.S. viewers (millions)
35	1	"Judges' Pick"	Signature blade (using steel from NYC streets)	Ida sword	April 11, 2017	1.46
Judges: Jason Knight, J. Neilson, David Baker, Doug Marcaida These four contestants from previous seasons, each chosen by one of the four judges, were invited to compete again. Results: 1. Mareko Maumasi (S1, E7) (Doug's pick) 2. Josh Smith (S3, E5) (Jason's pick) 3. David Goldberg (S1, E4) (J's pick) 4. Erin Simmons (S2, E3) (Dave's pick)
36	2	"Deer Horn Knives"	Signature blade (using golf club steel)	Deer horn knives	April 11, 2017	1.22
Judges: Jason Knight, David Baker, Doug Marcaida Results: 1. Nicholas Marcelja 2. Steve Godfrey 3. Dustin Rhodes 4. Thor Laizans
37	3	"The Katzbalger"	Two Push Daggers	Katzbalger	April 18, 2017	1.16
Judges: Jason Knight, David Baker, Doug Marcaida Results: 1. James Helm 2. Paul Walsh 3. Rashelle Hams 4.〈Jesse Hauer〉
38	4	"Makraka"	Karambit (curved blade)	Azande Makraka	April 25, 2017	1.24
Judges: Jason Knight, David Baker, Doug Marcaida Results: 1. Craig Barr 2. Paul Brown 3. Brian Dimmock 4. Mark Nevling
39	5	"Fan's Choice"	Signature blade (using barbed wire)	Panabas	May 2, 2017	1.05
Judges: Jason Knight, David Baker, Doug Marcaida These four contestants from previous seasons were invited to compete again based on fans' reaction to their initial performance. Results: 1. Josh Weston (S2 E6) 2. Ray Kirk (S1 E8) 3. Robby Bowman (S3 E5) 4. Chad Osborne (S2 E7)
40	6	"Akrafena"	Kukri (Jason Knight's signature blade)	Akrafena	May 9, 2017	1.22
Judges: Jason Knight, David Baker, Doug Marcaida Results: 1. Page Steinhardt 2. Brock Martin 3. Larry Clements 4. Terry Mitchell
41	7	"Talwar"	Signature blade	Talwar	May 16, 2017	1.32
Judges: Jason Knight, David Baker, Doug Marcaida Results: 1. Jordan LaMothe 2. David McConnell 3. Rick Fenlon 4. Carl Oliver
42	8	"The Cinquedea"	Signature blade (using mining tool steel)	Cinquedea	May 23, 2017	1.18
Judges: J. Neilson, David Baker, Doug Marcaida Results: 1. Neil Kamimura 2. Dan Hurtado 3. Storm Richardson 4. Demetrios Papatriantafyllou
43	9	"The Charay"	Signature blade (using salvaged steel)	Afridi Charay	June 6, 2017	1.27
Judges: J. Neilson, David Baker, Doug Marcaida Results: 1. Steve Grosvenor 2. Ryan Rowe 3. Mark Green 4. Tyler Mandgie
44	10	"Sword Breaker: Redemption"	Signature blade (using salvaged steel from a jackhammer)	Swordbreaker	June 13, 2017	1.35
Judges: J. Neilson, David Baker, Doug Marcaida This episode featured contestants eliminated from previous episodes returning for a chance at redemption. Results: 1. James Huse (S1 E3) 2. Erich Ouellette (S3 E14) 3. Earl Blackmore (S2 E3) 4. Morgan Medlen (S2 E5)
45	11	"Master & Apprentice"	Signature blade	Nzappa zap	July 11, 2017	1.04
Judges: J. Neilson, David Baker, Doug Marcaida Four master/apprentice pairs competed in this episode. When Jesse withdrew at the end of the first round because of a family emergency, Zack was allowed to continue on his own. Results: 1. Frank Allen Wren II & Nehemiah Brousseau 2. Jesse Rhodes & Zack Lewis 3. Robert Timberlake & Wesley Alberson 4. Joseph Szilaski & John Lewis
46	12	"Ngombe Ngulu"	Signature blade (using steel from an elevator cable)	Ngombe Ngulu	July 18, 2017	1.31
Judges: J. Neilson, David Baker, Doug Marcaida Results: 1. Steven Bryan 2. Paul Brach 3. Robert Putantsu 4. Ryan Weeks
47	13	"The Shamshir"	Bowie knife	Shamshir	July 25, 2017	1.31
Judges: J. Neilson, David Baker, Doug Marcaida Results: 1. Andrew Takach 2. Tim Shoal 3. Tom Kinder 4. Chad Hollar
48	14	"The Kachin Dao"	Signature blade (using steel from nautical equipment)	Kachin dao	August 1, 2017	1.30
Judges: J. Neilson, David Baker, Doug Marcaida Results: 1. Shawn Ellis 2. Rachel Oliver 3. Buster Grubbs 4.〈Chad Bozeman〉
49	15	"The Gladiator Scissor"	Dagger (using a canister Damascus billet)	Gladiator scissor	August 8, 2017	1.29
Judges: J. Neilson, David Baker, Doug Marcaida Results: 1. Don Halter 2. Jason Henderson 3. Alf Rudd 4. Francesco Muci
50	16	"The Kampilan"	Signature blade (using scrap yard steel and a coal forge)	Kampilan	August 22, 2017	1.30
Judges: J. Neilson, David Baker, Doug Marcaida Results: 1. Michael Cross 2. Todd Martin 3. Jack Barber 4. Leland Edward Stone
51	17	"The Kpinga"	Signature blade (using a Raindrop Damascus pattern)	Kpinga	August 29, 2017	1.53
Judges: J. Neilson, David Baker, Doug Marcaida Results: 1. Nate Summers 2. Richard Epting 3. Jim Poor 4. John Rainey
52	18	"The Yatagan"	Signature blade (using steel from a 1971 Mercury Cougar)	Yatagan	September 12, 2017	1.39
Judges: J. Neilson, David Baker, Doug Marcaida Results: 1. Gabe Mabry 2. Dave Catoe 3. Josh Fikentscher 4. Randall W Turner
53	19	"International Championship"	Signature blade	Spadroon	October 3, 2017	1.51
Judges: J. Neilson, David Baker, Doug Marcaida Results: 1. (United States) J.W. Randall 2. (France) Julien Maniglier 3. (Argentina) Guillermo Mendoza 4. (Poland) Michal Sielicki
54	20	"The Tabar-Shishpar"	Signature blade (using pipe wrenches)	Tabar-shishpar	October 10, 2017	1.53
Judges: J. Neilson, David Baker, Doug Marcaida Results: 1. Mark Steele Knapp 2. Chris Price 3. Holden Bystry 4. Dan Rotblatt
55	21	"Ultimate Champions Edition"	Signature blade (using canister Damascus)	Jian (tai chi sword)	October 17, 2017	1.36
Judges: Ben Abbott, David Baker, Doug Marcaida Five champions from previous episodes were invited to compete again. Raymond Smith was eliminated based on the results of a preliminary test performed on blades that they forged ahead of time. Results: 1. Theo Nazz (S3 E14) 2. Neil Kamimura (S4 E8) 3. Kelly Vermeer-Vella (S3 E4) 4. Nicholas Marcelja (S4 E2) (Round 1) 5. Raymond Smith (S3 E15) (preliminary)
56	22	"Knights Templar"	Crusader dagger (using chainmail)	Crusader sword	October 24, 2017	1.43
Judges: Ben Abbott, David Baker, Doug Marcaida: Note: Josh Fenlon's father, Rick, competed in S4 E7.; Results: 1. David Mirabile 2. Brian Rognholt 3. Josh Fenlon 4. Richard Moore
57	23	"Viking Edition"	Viking Seax	Viking war axes	October 31, 2017	1.30
Judges: Ben Abbott, David Baker, Doug Marcaida Results: 1. Jeremiah Backhaus 2. Chris Rowley 3. Jeff Renner 4. Joel Davis

=== Season 5 (2018) ===
Season five's episode numbering starts at zero.

No. in series	No. in season	Title	First weapon	Final weapon	Original release date	U.S. viewers (millions)
58	0	"The Rhomphaia"	Signature blade (using 1 of 6 Damascus patterns)	Rhomphaia	March 7, 2018	1.17
Judges: Ben Abbott, David Baker, Doug Marcaida Sometimes listed as E99. Results: 1. Billy Bob Sowell 2. Dwight Phillips 3. Mark Collard 4. Steve Culver
59	1	"Rookies Edition"	Signature blade	War Golok	March 13, 2018	1.24
Judges: Ben Abbott, David Baker, Doug Marcaida This episode followed the same structure as the "Ultimate Champions Edition" in Season 4, with five smiths who were inspired to take up the craft after watching the show. Results: 1. Brian Schmidt 2. Matt Wagner 3. Tyler Grant 4. Joey Lynn (Round 1) 5. Steve Johnson (preliminary)
60	2	"The Schiavona"	Signature blade with a lanyard loop (using farm equipment steel and a coal forge outdoors)	Schiavona	March 20, 2018	1.53
Judges: Ben Abbott, David Baker, Doug Marcaida Results: 1. Jeff Wagenaar 2. Brad McDougall 3. Brendan McHugh 4. Wes Whipple
61	3	"Sica Sword"	Signature blade (using caliber flintlock pistol)	Sica	March 27, 2018	1.19
Judges: Ben Abbott, David Baker, Doug Marcaida Results: 1. Tony Fetters 2. Frank Sausto 3. Corey Soper 4. Gage Mason
62	4	"Jumonji Yari"	Friction folder	Jumonji yari	April 3, 2018	1.30
Judges: J. Neilson, David Baker, Doug Marcaida Results: 1. Jacob Gayton 2. Fuad Accawi 3. Greg Sandstrom 4. Kyle Kilroy
63	5	"The Kabyle Flyssa"	Signature blade (using steel from a cannon)	Kabyle flyssa	April 10, 2018	1.60
Judges: Ben Abbott, David Baker, Doug Marcaida Results: 1. Collin Sage 2. Daniel Casey 3. Bob Hastings 4. Jesse Adcock
64	6	"Ultimate Team Challenge"	Trench knife	Chinese dao	April 17, 2018	1.16
Judges: Ben Abbott, David Baker, Doug Marcaida Master and apprentice pairs competed together. Each pair was required to alternate who worked on the blade at any given time. Results: 1. Mark J. Hopper & Jessica D. Collins 2. Joe Calton & Casey Perdue 3. Raleigh Desiato & Kelly Gregory 4. Tyler Adkins & Leon Vanguard
65	7	"Karabela"	Signature blade (using a chain and sprocket)	Karabela	April 24, 2018	1.20
Judges: J. Neilson, David Baker, Doug Marcaida Results: 1. Ethan Kempf 2. Liam Fuller 3. Ron Gramza 4. Evan Griffith
66	8	"The Zande Spear"	Damascus European dagger (J. Neilson's favorite blade)	Zande spear	May 1, 2018	1.13
Judges: J. Neilson, David Baker, Doug Marcaida Results: 1. Drew Goodson 2. Jason Nass 3. Daniel James Reichow 4. Larry Metcalf
67	9	"The Navaja"	Signature blade (using a coal forge in a rock quarry)	Navaja	May 8, 2018	1.12
Judges: Ben Abbott, David Baker, Doug Marcaida Results: 1. Matthew Christiano 2. Wade Seiders 3. Christoph Deringer 4. Brandon Austin
68	10	"The German Halberd"	Scottish Dirk (Dave Baker's favorite blade)	German Halberd	May 15, 2018	1.18
Judges: Ben Abbott, David Baker, Doug Marcaida Results: 1. Phillip Baldwin 2. Johnathan Sibley 3. Doran Doran 4. Ben Swapp
69	11	"The Two-Handed Sword"	Signature blade (using steel from a motorcycle)	Indian Two-handed sword	May 22, 2018	1.06
Judges: Ben Abbott, David Baker, Doug Marcaida Results: 1. Jonathan Allen 2. Ed Wilson 3. Andy Walker 4. Jordan Kataris
70	12	"The Naval Cutlass (Military History Tribute)"	Combat knife (using steel from an anti-tank hedgehog)	M1917 Naval Cutlass	May 28, 2018	1.18
Judges: J. Neilson, David Baker, Doug Marcaida Results: 1. Jon Nagel (Battalion S3 Operations Officer; Army Reserve) 2. Mike Miller (Marines) 3. Jim McGuinn (Armored Scout; Army) 4.〈Perry Johnson〉(Combat Medic; Army)
71	13	"The Horseman's Axe"	Signature blade with a through tang (using spring steel)	Horseman's axe	May 29, 2018	1.12
Judges: J. Neilson, David Baker, Doug Marcaida Results: 1. J. Alex Ruiz 2. Mike Bailey 3. Andrew Wasnac 4. Bill van Heteran
72	14	"The Lion Spear"	Hatchet (using steel randomly chosen from a burning barrel)	Maasai lion spear	June 5, 2018	1.10
Judges: J. Neilson, David Baker, Doug Marcaida Results: 1. John Grady Hippard 2. Matthew Berry 3. Aaron Morrison 4. J.C. Krusen
73	15	"The Kelewang"	Signature blade (using mild steel and drill bits)	Kelewang	June 12, 2018	1.13
Judges: Ben Abbott, David Baker, Doug Marcaida Results: 1. Tim Louk 2. Hunter Johnson 3. Alan Kirby 4. Edward Lacie
74	16	"Bagh Nakh Blades"	Signature blade (using canister Damascus of nuts & bolts)	Bagh nakh	June 19, 2018	1.17
Judges: Ben Abbott, David Baker, Doug Marcaida Results: 1. Chad Hatfield 2. Josh Prince 3. Aaron Trosky 4. John Gulso
75	17	"The Glaive Guisarme"	KA-BAR knife	Glaive guisarme	June 26, 2018	1.05
Judges: J. Neilson, David Baker, Doug Marcaida Results: 1. Nick Santella 2. Alex Eisenberg 3. Brian Neville 4.〈Dwight Neely〉
76	18	"Pioneer Sword"	Multipurpose weapon (using old rescue tools)	Russian pioneer sword	July 3, 2018	1.07
Judges: J. Neilson, David Baker, Doug Marcaida Results: 1. Mark Sperry 2. Nicholas Downing 3. Garrin Bucco 4. John Dickinson
77	19	"Wind and Fire Wheels"	Signature blade (using metal from a bicycle)	Wind and fire wheels	July 17, 2018	1.08
Judges: J. Neilson, David Baker, Doug Marcaida Results: 1. Rebel Rodriguez 2. Chuck Cook 3. Tony Miller 4. Steve Lewis
78	20	"The Smallsword"	Friction folders (using steel coil)	Smallsword	July 24, 2018	1.02
Judges: J. Neilson, David Baker, Doug Marcaida Results: 1. Derek Melton 2. Bob Andrews 3. John Clark 4. Atsatsa Antonio
79	21	"The Anthropomorphic Sword"	Signature blade (using W1 steel and a giant nut)	Celtic anthropomorphic sword	July 31, 2018	1.07
Judges: J. Neilson, David Baker, Doug Marcaida Results: 1. Bill Behnke 2. Chuck Fowler 3. Cole Coffer 4. Brett Onnink
80	22	"The Kilij"	Signature blade (using a giant ball bearing)	Kilij	August 7, 2018	0.95
Judges: J. Neilson, David Baker, Doug Marcaida Results: 1. Connor J. Myers-Norton 2. Brian Weaver 3. Curtis Haaland 4. Marc Setzer
81	23	"The Sawback Hunting Sword"	Signature blade (using a coal forge and metal from camping equipment)	Sawback hunting sword	August 14, 2018	1.26
Judges: J. Neilson, David Baker, Doug Marcaida Results: 1. Trevor Rideout 2. Devin Cornell 3. Mike Camp 4. Gordon 'Gordy' Knapp
82	24	"The Arming Sword"	Three railroad spike knives (using railroad spikes)	Arming sword	August 21, 2018	1.14
Judges: J. Neilson, David Baker, Doug Marcaida Results: 1. John Stokes 2. Drew Hash 3. Duane Bennet 4. Quentin Horton
83	25	"The Sengese"	Serrated knife (using metal from scissors)	Sengese throwing knife	August 28, 2018	1.05
Judges: J. Neilson, David Baker, Doug Marcaida Results: 1. Ashe Cravenock 2. Levi Kring 3. Geoff Keyes 4. Jon Turner
84	26	"The Qinglong Ji"	Signature blade (using steel rings from a whiskey barrel)	Qinglong ji	September 4, 2018	1.14
Judges: J. Neilson, David Baker, Doug Marcaida Results: 1. Michael Kerley 2. Jason Fry 3. Rob Singleton 4. Ryan Breuer
85	27	"Hollywood Edition"	"Rambo" survival knife (using W1 round stock)	Hattori Hanzō katana	September 12, 2018	1.18
Judges: J. Neilson, David Baker, Doug Marcaida Results: 1. Mike Deibert 2. Trystan Nguyen 3. Brian Bivens 4. Douglas Loven
86	28	"The Steel Crossbow"	Damascus signature blade (using steel of different thicknesses)	Steel crossbow	September 19, 2018	1.14
Judges: Ben Abbott, David Baker, Doug Marcaida Results: 1. JD Hungerford 2. John-Francis Ellis 3. Jeffrey Hedgecock 4. Michael Trinkman
87	29	"The Landsknecht Sword"	Signature blade (using elevator cable)	Landsknecht sword	September 26, 2018	1.20
Judges: Ben Abbott, David Baker, Doug Marcaida Results: 1. Todd Andrews 2. DJ Morgan 3. Derek Roemer 4. Sam Troxell
88	30	"Tournament Round 1 (Farriers)"	Signature blade (using San mai technique from horseshoes and hoof rasps)	Mortuary sword	October 3, 2018	1.15
Judges: Ben Abbott, David Baker, Doug Marcaida This four-part invitational tournament is the first time four bladesmiths competing on an episode have the same background. Results: 1. Kirk Adkins 2. Riley Kirkpatrick 3. Chris Shook 4. Rae Lynn Vander Weide
89	31	"Tournament Round 2 (Armorers)"	Damascus blade (using layered Damascus from suit of armor)	Hooded katar	October 10, 2018	1.05
Judges: Ben Abbott, David Baker, Doug Marcaida Results: 1. Nicholas Cochiolo 2. Ryan Weaver 3. Howard Noble 4. Jacob Danker
90	32	"Tournament Round 3 (Blacksmiths)"	Damascus blade (using steel from tools)	Knightly pole axe	October 17, 2018	1.09
Judges: Ben Abbott, David Baker, Doug Marcaida Results: 1. Derick Kemper 2. Karl Dunn 3. Tony Roed 4. Charlie Carpenter
91	33	"Tournament Round 4 (Modern Metalworkers)"	Needle point Damascus blade (from a metal sculpture)	Flamberge rapier	October 24, 2018	1.15
Judges: Ben Abbott, David Baker, Doug Marcaida Results: 1. Dave Parthemore 2. Rick Rabjohn 3. Rodger "Grizz" LaBrash 4. Henry Massey
92	34	"Tournament Finals"	Wakizashi (using 1095 and 15N20)	Nodachi	October 31, 2018	1.39
Judges: Ben Abbott, David Baker, Doug Marcaida The winner received $50,000. Results: 1. Dave Parthemore (S5 E33) 2. Nicholas Cochiolo (S5 E31) 3. Kirk Adkins (S5 E30) 4. Derick Kemper (S5 E32)
93	35	"The Grim Reaper's Scythe (Slasher Edition)"	Signature slasher blades (using steel selected from a smoking cauldron)	Grim reaper's scythe	November 7, 2018	1.18
Judges: Ben Abbott, David Baker, Doug Marcaida Tim Miller's brother came in second in S5 E12. Results: 1. Brandon Williams 2. Chase Register 3. Tim Miller 4. David Sowards-Emmerd
94	36	"The Steel Takedown Bow"	Crusader's dagger (using W1 round stock)	Steel takedown bow	November 14, 2018	1.16
Judges: Ben Abbott, David Baker, Doug Marcaida Results: 1. Tommy Matthews 2. Michael Gould 3. Dana Dupuis 4. Herbert "Sindri" Robertson
95	37	"The Bardiche"	Signature blade (by making their own forges using storage unit materials)	Bardiche	November 21, 2018	1.15
Judges: Ben Abbott, David Baker, Doug Marcaida Round 1 was outdoors. Results: 1. John Wigger 2. Michael Peterson 3. Tim Troyer 4. Ken Hall
96	38	"The Pipe Tomahawks"	Damascus knife (using steel wool and 1095 powder)	Pipe tomahawks	December 12, 2018	0.97
Judges: Ben Abbott, David Baker, Doug Marcaida Results: 1. Mike Rowley 2. Cody Craig 3. Rob Sine 4. Buddy Thomas
97	39	"Ring Hilted Sword"	Celtic ring knife (Ben Abbott's favorite blade using wrought iron and 1095)	Ring hilted sword	December 19, 2018	1.04
Judges: Ben Abbott, David Baker, Doug Marcaida The contestants were not allowed the use of the drill presses in rounds 1 and 2. They had to drift the required hole in the knife and do a wrap to secure their scales. Results: 1. Shawn Shropshire 2. Jason Brown 3. Jody Lyddane 4. Aaron Mclean

=== Season 6 (2019) ===
No. in series	No. in season	Title	First weapon	Final weapon	Original release date	U.S. viewers (millions)
98	1	"Long Road to Redemption Part 1"	Throwing knife (using 1095 bar stock)	Chopper	February 6, 2019	1.07
Judges: J. Neilson, Ben Abbott, Doug Marcaida Seven non-winners from seasons 4 and 5 competed over two episodes for $20,000. In "Long Road to Redemption Part 1", seven returning non-winners competed outside using coal forges. One is eliminated before they go inside for testing, and one is eliminated after testing. The remaining five contestants are given 2 days in their home forges to make the "perfect chopper," after which a third contestant is eliminated. Results: 5. Rae Lynn Vander Weide (S5 E30) 6. Marc Setzer (S5 E22) 7. Zack Lewis (S4 E11)
99	2	"Long Road to Redemption Part 2"	Jambiya (using W1 round stock)	Finalist's choice	February 13, 2019	1.00
Judges: J. Neilson, Ben Abbott, Doug Marcaida Seven non-winners from seasons 4 and 5 competed over two episodes for $20,000. In "Long Road to Redemption Part 2", four remaining blacksmiths compete and at last, the two finalists choose which swords they will make at their home forges. Unlike previous seasons, the finalists were only given 4 days in their home forges. Results: 1. Matt Berry (S5 E14) (Arming sword) 2. Aaron Morrison (S5 E14) (Greek Kopis) 3. Chris Price (S4 E20) 4. David Sowards-Emmerd (S5 E35)
100	3	"Washington's Colichemarde"	Theodore Roosevelt's Rough Rider Bowie knife (using W1 round stock)	George Washington's Colichemarde	February 20, 2019	1.17
Judges: Ben Abbott, David Baker, Doug Marcaida Results: 1. Josh Nicolaides 2. Dan Bourlotos 3. John Sims 4. Andrew Smith
101	4	"The O-Katana"	Chopper knife (using metals from the previous 99 episodes)	Ōkatana	February 27, 2019	0.92
Judges: Ben Abbott, David Baker, Doug Marcaida Results: 1. Mickey Thompson 2. Cullen Erbacher 3. Robert Guest 4. Sam Halote
102	5	"The Hussar Saber"	Signature blade (using canister method)	Hussar Saber	March 6, 2019	1.05
Judges: Ben Abbott, David Baker, Doug Marcaida Results: 1. Deke Parker 2. Brian Evelich 3. Bubba Cantrell 4. Eric Radliff
103	6	"The Barbarian Sword"	Signature blade (using a pinball machine)	Barbarian sword	March 13, 2019	1.15
Judges: Ben Abbott, David Baker, Doug Marcaida Results: 1. Ethan Lee 2. Michael Seronde 3. Steve Humphrey 4. Amy Weiks
104	7	"The Javanese Kris"	Friction folders (using metal from a pickup truck)	Javanese Kris	April 17, 2019	1.09
Judges: Ben Abbott, David Baker, Doug Marcaida Results: 1. Steve Koster 2. John Medelin 3. Joe Nipper 4. Brad Richardson
105	8	"General Yamashita's Guntō"	Fairbairn Sykes fighting knife (using three sizes of W1 round stock)	General Yamashita's Guntō	April 24, 2019	1.18
Judges: J. Neilson, David Baker, Doug Marcaida Results: 1. Elijah Williams 2. Richey Crew 3. Austin Hensley 4. Dan Linton
106	9	"The Greek Kopis"	Signature blade (combining large and small springs)	Kopis	May 1, 2019	1.01
Judges: Ben Abbott, David Baker, Doug Marcaida Results: 1. John Summerhill 2. Mike Vannoy 3. Daniel Luevano 4. Curtis Shaw
107	10	"Branch Battle: Army"	V-42 stiletto	U.S. Army Officer's Sword	May 8, 2019	0.97
Judges: J. Neilson, David Baker, Doug Marcaida Results: 1. Tyler Hackbarth (Sergeant E-5) 2. Fermin Lopez (Sergeant, Black Hawk Combat Medic) 3. Jack Stottlemire (Sergeant Major) 4. Dave Frotton (Sniper)
108	11	"Branch Battle: Air Force"	Bolo knife (San mai using a helicopter rotor nut and W1 round stock)	Air Force NCO Sword	May 8, 2019	0.87
Judges: Ben Abbott, David Baker, Doug Marcaida Results: 1. Mike Andriacco (Master Sergeant) 2. Matt Prentice (Technical Sergeant) 3. Joe Stickel (Chief Master Sergeant) 4. Daren Tolley (Technical Sergeant, 173rd Fighter Wing)
109	12	"Branch Battle: Marines"	KA-BAR	Marine Corps Officer's Sword	May 15, 2019	0.93
Judges: Ben Abbott, David Baker, Doug Marcaida Results: 1. Gene "Giddyup" Hodges (Master Sergeant) 2. Tripp Gwin (Sergeant) 3. Garrett Elting (Corporal) 4. Rick Johnson (Lance Corporal)
110	13	"Branch Battle: Navy"	Mark 3 dive knife	U.S. Naval Officer's Sword	May 15, 2019	0.88
Judges: Ben Abbott, David Baker, Doug Marcaida Results: 1. Lee Crawford (Operations Specialist, 2nd Class) 2. Jerad Clymer (Boatswain, 1st Class) 3. Elijah Waddle (Lieutenant) 4. Tyler Northcutt (Fire Controlman Chief Petty Officer)
111	14	"Branch Battle: Finals"	M3 trench knife	George Washington's Lion-headed Cuttoe	May 22, 2019	1.24
Judges: Ben Abbott, David Baker, Doug Marcaida The winner received $50,000. Results: 1. Tyler Hackbarth (Army) (S6 E10) 2. Gene Hodges (Marines) (S6 E12) 3. Mike Andriacco (Air Force) (S6 E11) 4. Lee Crawford (Navy) (S6 E13)
112	15	"The Nagamaki"	Signature blade (using gym equipment)	Nagamaki	May 29, 2019	0.90
Judges: Ben Abbott, David Baker, Doug Marcaida Results: 1. Braxton Cox 2. Jake Sewell 3. Kyle Reese 4. Steve Wayne
113	16	"Atilla's Sword of Mars"	Fantasy blade (using a meteorite)	Sword of Attila	June 5, 2019	0.99
Judges: Ben Abbott, David Baker, Doug Marcaida Results: 1. Randy Caston 2. Dan Strang 3. Chris VanGoethem 4. Grover Clifton
114	17	"The Partizan"	Signature blade (using an old forge's steel)	Partizan	June 12, 2019	0.99
Judges: Ben Abbott, David Baker, Doug Marcaida Results: 1. Philip Schrei 2. John Norwood 3. Matt Waters 4. Ian Rutkosky
115	18	"The Messer Sword"	Signature blade (using canister Damascus)	Messer sword	June 19, 2019	0.95
Judges: Ben Abbott, David Baker, Doug Marcaida Results: 1. Jeff Peters 2. John Thunert 3. Tanner Hetke 4. Jason Palmer
116	19	"The Ram-dao"	Kukri (using steel from a snowmobile)	Ram-dao	June 26, 2019	0.94
Judges: Ben Abbott, David Baker, Doug Marcaida Round 1 was outdoors in the snow using coal forges. Results: 1. Josh Navarrete 2. Ben Spangler 3. Kasey Kinkade 4. Adam Jankowski
117	20	"The Foot Artillery Sword"	Signature blade (using old metal toys)	Foot Artillery Sword	July 3, 2019	0.90
Judges: Ben Abbott, David Baker, Doug Marcaida Contestants had 2 hours in round 2 starting with this episode. Results: 1. John Phillips 2. Tommy Rodriguez 3. Chuck Stone 4. Levi Arbogast
118	21	"Astronaut Knife"	M1 NASA Survival knife	Spiked Mace	July 17, 2019	1.12
Judges: J. Neilson, David Baker, Doug Marcaida Results: 1. Jason Anderson 2. Sam Farnworth 3. Mark Campana 4. Tom Garden
119	22	"The Lochaber Axe"	Signature blade with a knuckle duster (using a steel cage & barbed wire)	Lochaber Axe	July 24, 2019	1.05
Judges: J. Neilson, David Baker, Doug Marcaida Results: 1. Joshua Frost 2. Jesse Delveaux 3. Jared Hobson 4. Daniel Williams
120	23	"The Cane sword"	Karambit (Doug Marcaida's favorite blade)	Cane Sword	July 31, 2019	0.91
Judges: Ben Abbott, David Baker, Doug Marcaida Results: 1. Doug Butts 2. Ashley Shaw 3. Cody Myers 4. Chad Bowlin
121	24	"The Boar Sword"	Signature blade (using construction materials)	Boar Sword	August 7, 2019	1.10
Judges: Ben Abbott, David Baker, Doug Marcaida Results: 1. Jonathan Caruso 2. Isaac Grunstra 3. Justin Kirck 4. Angel Medina Jimenez
122	25	"The Falchion"	Chopper (using a Damascus pattern)	Falchion	August 14, 2019	1.05
Judges: J. Neilson, David Baker, Doug Marcaida Results: 1. Wayne Meligan 2. Mark Hemley 3. Aaron Meliza 4. Jesse Hemphill
123	26	"Napoleon's Saber"	Signature blade (using ladder pattern Damascus from a metal ladder)	Napoleon Bonaparte's Saber	August 21, 2019	1.00
Judges: J. Neilson, David Baker, Doug Marcaida Results: 1. Seth Borries 2. Steven Hunter 3. Shaun Carr 4.〈Jonathon Morphis〉
124	27	"The Bhuj"	Signature blade (using canister Damascus with metal from a barber chair)	Bhuj	August 28, 2019	1.03
Judges: Ben Abbott, David Baker, Doug Marcaida Results: 1. Joe Vachon 2. Benton Frisse 3. Josh Howard 4. Adam Vordermark
125	28	"Blackbeard's Cutlass"	Pirate's boarding axe	Blackbeard's Cutlass	September 4, 2019	1.09
Judges: Ben Abbott, David Baker, Doug Marcaida Results: 1. Jason Crum 2. Seth Marshall 3. Stephen Montgomery 4. Joseph Nimmons
126	29	"Kung Fu Edition"	Kunai throwing knives (using W1 round stock)	9-Ring Broadsword	September 18, 2019	0.83
Judges: Ben Abbott, David Baker, Doug Marcaida Results: 1. Mike Whetten 2. Burton Harruff 3. Collin Miller 4. Monty Styron
127	30	"Genghis Khan's Sword"	Signature blade (using metal from a go-kart)	Genghis Khan's Sword	September 25, 2019	0.87
Judges: J. Neilson, David Baker, Doug Marcaida Results: 1. Everett Stone 2. Peter Hill 3. James Mays 4. Kodee Artis

=== Season 7 (2019–2020) ===
No. in series	No. in season	Title	First weapon	Final weapon	Original release date	U.S. viewers (millions)
128	1	"Sword Of Perseus"	Signature blade (using metal from Greek armor and the Go-mai technique)	Sword of Perseus	October 9, 2019	0.81
Judges: J. Neilson, David Baker, Doug Marcaida Results: 1. Jarred Ball 2. Rob Wayman 3. Dave McKay 4. Luke Anderson
129	2	"General Patton's Sabre"	Gunstock war club (using 1095 high-carbon steel)	General Patton's sabre	October 16, 2019	1.02
Judges: J. Neilson, David Baker, Doug Marcaida In round 1, four bladesmiths are asked to replicate a "parameter-heavy" mystery blade in just two hours. Neither the weapon nor the weapon tests are revealed. For round 2, the three remaining smiths are tasked with adding wooden handles to what is unveiled to be a gunstock war club. Two finalists go head-to-head at their home forges to fabricate General Patton's sabre. Results: 1. John McNerney 2. Chris Erbach 3. Ted Thornton 4. Josh Adams
130	3	"The Jian Sword"	Mash-up blade (using W1 round stock)	Jian sword	October 23, 2019	0.83
Judges: J. Neilson, David Baker, Doug Marcaida Contestants were given a choice of 5 knife styles and had to combine the blade from one and the handle from another. Results: 1. Casey Cleveland 2. Vince Molina 3. Shawn Moulenbelt 4. Ryan Brodbeck
131	4	"The Rock-Throwing Crossbow"	Competition Choppers (using metal from the retired "Big Blu" machine)	Rock-throwing crossbow	October 23, 2019	0.75
Judges: J. Neilson, David Baker, Doug Marcaida Results: 1. Colton Arias 2. Craig Miller 3. Bryce Perez 4. Grant Saxman
132	5	"Halloween Edition"	Zombie killer knife (using salvage steel from broken blades)	War scythe	October 30, 2019	0.91
Judges: J. Neilson, David Baker, Doug Marcaida Results: 1. Trevor Jenkinson 2. Alex Hillemeir 3. Jeff Glasco 4. Willis Forninash
133	6	"The Boa-Zande Sword"	Signature blade (using canister Damascus with drill bits)	Boa-zande sword	October 30, 2019	0.70
Judges: Ben Abbott, David Baker, Doug Marcaida Results: 1. Justin Chenault 2. Ben Jennen 3. Sawyer Hibbard 4. Mike Pierce
134	7	"The Musketeer Rapier"	Fossil Damascus signature blade	Musketeer rapier	November 6, 2019	0.96
Results: 1. Jesse Ewing 2. Teddy Royer 3. Wilson Filaw 4. Dale Thorson
135	8	"The Tizona of El Cid"	San-mai blades (using metal from musical instruments)	Tizona of El Cid	November 6, 2019	0.70
Results: 1. Brent Smith 2. Thomas Hacker 3.〈Jerry Cripe〉 4. Rick Hall
136	9	"Military Tribute"	Signature blade (using steel from a mock Panzer tank)	Mad Jack Churchill's Scottish backsword	November 13, 2019	0.81
Results: 1. Billy Salyers 2. Robert Soria 3. Shawn Chakravarty 4. Mike Johnston
137	10	"Revolutionary War Spontoon"	Signature blade (using steel springs)	Revolutionary War sergeant's spontoon	November 13, 2019	0.65
Results: 1. Chris Hedberg 2. Zane Burch 3. Rocky Lemon 4. Tyler Hall
138	11	"The Barbarian Spatha"	Pugio (using the hada technique)	Barbarian spatha sword	November 20, 2019	0.99
Results: 1. Alex Horn 2. Kevin Burkman 3. Mike Benton 4. Pat Biggin
139	12	"Family Edition"	Signature blade	Inigo Montoya's rapier	November 27, 2019	1.04
Results: 1. Ron Hardman 2. Jesse Harrison 3. Jessica Hardman 4. Robert Harrison
140	13	"Frankish Throwing Axes"	Camp knife (using steel from a barbecue grill)	Franciscas	December 11, 2019	0.99
Results: 1. Nic Overton 2. Justin Kowspiachi 3. Cameron Alarcio 4. Matt Presti
141	14	"A Very Forged Christmas"	Signature blade (using the san mai technique)	British light cavalry sword	December 18, 2019	0.91
Results: 1. Boyd Ritter 2. Jamie Chandler 3. Bill Young 4. Ben Arlotta
142	15	"The Chinese War Sword"	Signature blade (using a steel grate)	Chinese War Sword	January 1, 2020	1.07
Results: 1. Bobby Walker 2. Will Pearman 3. Justin Burton 4. Dallas Bradshaw
143	16	"The Sword in the Stone"	Signature blade (using various Damascus patterns)	Medieval Broadsword	January 8, 2020	0.96
Results: 1. Scott Sweder 2. Colton Kiso 3. Jarrett Cieslak 4. Sam Smith
144	17	"Charlemagne's Sword"	Signature blade (using surprise metals)	King Charlemagne's "Joyeuse"	January 15, 2020	1.10
Results: 1. Peyton Ramm 2. Mitch Cargile 3. Jason Tiensvold 4. Parker Mayers
145	18	"The Spanish Conquistador Sword"	WWII Special Forces smatchet knife (Canister Damascus using metal from street weapons)	Spanish Conquistador sword	January 22, 2020	0.89
Results: 1. Cody Hofsommer 2. Brendan Steele 3. Ed Clarke 4. Zach Vince
146	19	"The Pira"	Hada technique blade	Pira	January 29, 2020	0.87
Results: 1. Kevin Burgess 2. Weslie Null 3. Kenny Smith 4. Mike Poor
147	20	"The French Pioneer Sword"	Chef knife (using farm equipment)	Rooster-head French pioneer sword	January 29, 2020	0.97
Results: 1. Cade David Jenkins 2. Steven Brady 3. Ben Snure 4. Nick Johnson
148	21	"Darb Sri Gun Chai Battle Sword"	Twist & stack Damascus blade	Darb Sri Gun Chai	February 5, 2020	0.79
Results: 1. Paul Pinto 2. James Davis 3. Aric Davis 4. Robert Martin
149	22	"Zulu War Axe"	Japanese Nata	Zulu war axe	February 5, 2020	0.89
Results: 1. Weston Paas 2. Dustin Parrella 3. Josh Powell 4. Jeih Meinhold
150	23	"The Chinese Zhanmadao"	Signature blade (with additional parameters added during forging)	Zhanmadao	March 11, 2020	0.82
Results: 1. Josh Wisor 2. Nic Meyer 3. Scotty Helms 4. Daniel Lucynski
151	24	"The German Dussage"	Canister Damascus blade	German Dussage sword	March 18, 2020	0.87
Results: 1. Scott Powers 2. Marc Dean 3. Matt Duncan 4. Steven Katz
152	25	"First Responders Edition"	Tactical knife (using metal from rescue tools)	Halligan Bar	March 25, 2020	0.91
Results: 1. Britt Barnes (Retired U.S Border Patrol agent) 2. Forest Hansen (Retired firefighter captain) 3. Chris Campbell (EMS chief firefighter) 4. Mark Casina (Army Military Police officer)
153	26	"Game of Forge"	Dagger (using a coal forge)	Épée de Combat (Game of Thrones tribute to Arya Stark's "Needle")	April 1, 2020	0.82
Results: 1. Trevor Crowell 2. Victor Gonzalez 3. Mitchell Ray Greene 4. Garrett Secchi
154	27	"The Ikakalaka"	Signature blade (using one forging technique)	Ikakalaka	April 8, 2020	1.01
Ricardo Vilar was a judge on the Latin American version of Forged in Fire. Results: 1. Ricardo Vilar 2. Nick Hix 3. Travis Henderson 4. Leon Husock
155	28	"Samurai Showdown"	Tanto dagger	Sodegarami	April 15, 2020	0.91
Results: 1. Rita Thurman 2. Justin Harrington 3. Chuy Talavera 4. Cory Miller
156	29	"Baby Boomers vs. Gen Z"	Choice of Old-style or New-style Bowie	Sword of Goujian	April 22, 2020	1.03
Each style of bowie had a different set of parameters: Old style: Simple block of steel, power tools could not be used, framed handle with straight guard.; New style: Damascus steel, power tools could be used, acid-etched handle with two guards.; Results: 1. Forrest Ketner (Baby Boomers) 2. Caleb Ledford (Gen Z) 3. Zach Batanyan (Gen Z) 4. Jimmy Pool (Baby Boomers)
157	30	"The Nimcha"	Signature blade (using scrap metal shavings)	Nimcha	April 29, 2020	1.00
Results: 1. Ryan Demott 2. Steve Wells 3. Wesley Barron 4. Bud Smith
158	31	"Titanium Smackdown"	Titanium blade	Horsemen's Tabar and Hidden Dagger	May 6, 2020	0.93
In a reversal of sorts, the smiths created the titanium handles in the first round before forging the dagger blades in the second. To accommodate for this, the forges and power tools were made available in both rounds, a first for the show. Results: 1. Jarrod Fiscus 2. Jimmy Martin 3. Dorian Mosak 4. Collin Steenbergen
159	32	"Tomahawk and Bowie"	Signature blade (using a forged key to open lock boxes of metal)	Tomahawk and Bowie knife	July 15, 2020	0.74
Judges: J. Neilson, David Baker, Doug Marcaida Jennifer's husband Jody was on S5 E39. Results: 1. Brian Easterling 2. Doc Shiffer 3. Jennifer Lyddane 4. Stephen Fury
160	33	"Japanese Ono"	"Puzzle" (making a blade using only a blank outline)	Ono (axe)	July 22, 2020	0.85
Results: 1. Keaton Goddard 2. Logan Brackin 3. Dale Paris 4. Nicholas Nichols
161	34	"Super Champion Edition"	Signature blade	Russian Cossack World War II Shashka Saber	July 29, 2020	0.84
Four champions from previous episodes were invited to participate in this episode. After competing against each other, the winner challenged one of the judges, a veteran weapon recreation bladesmith. In the final round, Collin Sage competed and won against judge David Baker in a side-by-side duel in the studio forge. Results: 1. Collin Sage (S5 E5) 2. Jon Nagel (S5 E12) 3. Mike Rowley (S5 E38) 4. "Spicy" Mike Kerley (S5 E26)
162	35	"The Boateng Saber"	Signature blade ("pay-to-play" competition)	Boateng Saber	August 5, 2020	0.89
In the "pay-to-play" competition, the competitors used money to buy metal and materials. Results: 1. Glayden Carney 2. Matt Montgomery 3. Colette Dumont 4. Jimbo Henson
163	36	"Summer Forging Games Part 1"	Event 1	Event 2	August 12, 2020	0.87
Event 1: Signature blades (using W1 steel & railroad spikes); Event 2: Damascus-layered Throwing knives Results: 1. Chad Kennedy (20 points) 2. Matt Bingaman (9 points) 3. Gary Bird (7 points) 4. Gene Click (4 points/Eliminated)
164	37	"Summer Forging Games Part 2"	Event 3	Event 4	August 19, 2020	0.84
Event 3: Greek Xiphos; Event 4: Choice of Kachin Dao (5 points), Katzbalger (10 points), Kora sword (15 points), Ngombe Ngulu (20 points) Results: 1. Chad Kennedy (84 points, $15,000) (S7 E36) 2. Gary Bird (52 points, $4,000) (S7 E36) 3. Matt Bingaman (38 points, $1,000) (S7 E36) 4. N/A

=== Season 8 (2020–2022) ===
Grady Powell replaced Wil Willis as host at the beginning of season 8.

No. in series	No. in season	Title	First weapon	Final weapon	Original release date	U.S. viewers (millions)
165	1	"Veteran's Knife Special"	Case American Heroes Knife Series	American Eagle Head Sabre	November 18, 2020	0.99
The "Case American Heroes Knife Series" consists of the "Lamb Hunter" – SGM Kyle Lamb, Army; "The Hambone" – SGT Clint Romesha, Army; "The Skinner" – Kevin Holland, Navy & Army; "Recurve Utility #6" – Harry Bologna, Navy. Results: 1. Mike Rizzo (Army veteran) 2. Brandon Rader (Army veteran) 3. Chris Coe (father is Vietnam War veteran) 4. Trish Arnone (Army veteran)
166	2	"The Deadly Vajra-Mushti"	Signature blade (using canister Damascus from round tubes)	Vajra Mushti	November 25, 2020	1.00
Judges: Ben Abbott, David Baker, Doug Marcaida Results: 1. Kyle Farace 2. Ben Allanson 3. Zach Tarbell 4. A.J. Saracinello
167	3	"The Legendary Sword of Saladin"	Signature blade (using suspension cable or piano wire)	Sword of Saladin	December 2, 2020	0.77
Judges: Ben Abbott, David Baker, Doug Marcaida Results: 1. Walter Baranowski 2. Bryan Dana Custance 3. Paul DeStefano 4. Evan Cihak
168	4	"M1905 Springfield Bayonet"	Signature blade (Brute de forge challenge)	M1905 Springfield bayonet	December 9, 2020	0.92
Judges: Ben Abbott, David Baker, Doug Marcaida In the Brute de forge challenge, the blade is forged to shape, not ground. Results: 1. Josh Wentz 2. Brad Ditty 3. Menno 4. Will Morris
169	5	"The Giant Sword of William Wallace"	Scale down 9-foot long dagger to a version 1/5 its size	William Wallace broadsword	December 16, 2020	0.78
Judges: J. Neilson, David Baker, Doug Marcaida Results: 1. James Welker 2. Lyle Nordquist 3. Ben Butcher 4. Paul Crosby
170	6	"Forged in Fire Christmas: Forging Wonderland"	Signature blade (using steel from Santa's sleigh)	George Washington's battle sword	December 23, 2020	0.80
Judges: J. Neilson, David Baker, Doug Marcaida Results: 1. Stryker Gooch 2. Pablo Martinez 3. Jaron Martindale 4. Kodie Brewster
171	7	"Judges' Home Forge Battle"	TBC	TBC	December 30, 2022	TBC
Judges: J. Neilson, David Baker, Ben Abbott Results: N/A
172	8	"The Massive Maguro Bocho"	Cleaver (using W1 steel from meat hooks)	Maguro bōchō	January 6, 2021	0.92
Judges: J. Neilson, David Baker, Doug Marcaida Results: 1. Doug Zegel 2. Justin Workman 3. D.J. Brelje 4. Rob Kemensky
173	9	"Teeth of the Tegha"	Signature blade (using steel from burned car)	Serrated Tegha sword	January 13, 2021	0.89
Judges: J. Neilson, David Baker, Doug Marcaida Results: 1. Aric Fontaine 2. Kevin Adams 3. Beau Geeson 4. Starlin Moran
174	10	"Headhunter's Revenge"	Signature blade ("Perfect Timing" challenge)	Headhunter Axe	February 17, 2021	0.85
Judges: J. Neilson, David Baker, Doug Marcaida In the "Perfect Timing" challenge, smiths must choose between different forging techniques, each with its own time limit. The round 1 options included: 4 hours: Stacked canister Damascus (no one); 3 hours: Ladder pattern Damascus (Jordan, Jesse, Marcus); 2 hours: Railroad spike San Mai (Eric); 1 hour: Large ball bearing (no one); In round 2, smiths had the choice of handle construction that would determine how much time they had in this round: 2 hours: Handle, guard, and mosaic pin (no one); 90 minutes: Handle plus guard (Marcus); 1 hour: Handle scales only (Jordan, Jesse); In keeping with the "Beat the clock" theme, the smiths were only give 3 days in the home forges during round 3. Results: 1. Jordan Kepler 2. Jesse Overton 3. Marcus Wise 4. Eric Alrecht
175	11	"Russian Special Forces Spetsnaz"	Pry bar knives (using steel from various tools)	Spetsnaz shovel	February 24, 2021	0.83
Judges: J. Neilson, David Baker, Doug Marcaida Results: 1. Mike Powell 2. Cameron LaFranc 3. Travis Robie 4. Garrett Olsen
176	12	"Machete of the Amazons"	Bowie knives ("Flip the Script" challenge)	Dahomey machete	March 3, 2021	0.77
Judges: J. Neilson, David Baker, Doug Marcaida The "Flip the Script" challenge involved the contestants deciding amongst themselves the type of blade they would make and all other parameters, including handle material. They were not allowed to choose a monosteel construction. The parameters decided on were: Blade type: Bowie; Blade length: 10"; Total length: 15"; Blade width: 2"; Construction: Go mai; Handle construction: Two materials, G10 and ironwood; Other: They must include a lanyard loop; Results: 1. Adam Coonradt 2. Alex Morris 3. Charlie Bridges 4. Scott Bragg
177	13	"San Mai Mystery"	Signature blade (using "mystery" steel with San Mai technique)	Pira sword (featured in season 7)	March 10, 2021	0.86
The contestants are asked to make a San Mai blade. To keep with the mystery theme, the contestants not only have to figure out for themselves what kind of steel they have, but also have to contend with an "invisible clock" for the first round, only relying on time callouts from Grady. In the final round, weapons are tested in the "forge of mystery" which contains various mysterious materials for testing. Results: 1. Davy Wilson 2. Garrett Kemble 3. Chevy Waddoups 4. Terry Dickey
178	14	"Second Chance Tournament: Part 1"	Duel 1: "Tough Breaks" (Signature blades using metal from broken blades)	Duel 2: "Beat by the Clock" (Signature blades using bars of 80CrV2 and steel)	March 24, 2021	0.82
For the first time on Forged In Fire history, eight former competitors head back to the forge for a second chance at $10,000. Two smiths who suffered catastrophic failures face-off while two smiths who failed to turn in blades in time get another shot to beat the clock. The winner of each 5-hour duel received $2,000 and a place in the final round of the tournament. Duel 1: "Tough Breaks" bracket results: 1. James Mays (S6 E30) 2. Steve Wells (S7 E30) Duel 2: "Beat by the Clock" bracket results: 1. Jennifer Lyddane (S7 E32) 2. Gordon "Gordy" Knapp (S5 E23)
179	15	"Second Chance Tournament: Part 2"	Duel 3: "Runner-up" (Dagger & Chopper using 1095 & 15N20 steel plates each in a Damascus pattern)	Duel 4: "Untested" (Haladie using W1 round-stock steel)	March 31, 2021	0.79
The Second Chance Tournament continues with the remaining duels. Two runner-up smiths battle it out in the forge to prove they have what it takes to be number one. Then two more smiths whose blades failed to make it to testing compete to get their weapons into the hands of the judges. Duel 3: "Runner-up" bracket results: 1. Michael Seronde (S6 E6) 2. Rick Rabjohn (S5 E33) Duel 4: "Untested" bracket results: 1. Sam Smith (S7 E16) 2. Jason Palmer (S6 E18)
180	16	"Second Chance Tournament: Finals"	San mai chopper (using 52100 steel ball bearing and salvaged steel from excavator bucket)	Flyssa	April 7, 2021	0.62
After winning their duels, the four remaining smiths go all out in the final round—creating a san mai chopper from a ball bearing and steel from a backhoe bucket. Two smiths survive to recreate a weapon from a past Forged in Fire episode (S5, E5), the Flyssa. Results: 1. Jennifer Lyddane (S7 E32 & S8 E13) 2. James Mays (S6 E30 & S8 E13) 3. Sam Smith (S7 E16 & S8 E14) 4. Michael Seronde (S6 E6 & S8 E14)
181	17	"Memory Game"	Judge Dave Baker's blade copy from memory (using 1095 and 15N20 steel plates)	Elephant tusk sword	April 14, 2021	0.75
Results: 1. Jayden Simisky 2. Matt Schweinberg 3. Connor Logan 4. Jason Redman
182	18	"Forged in Fire: WWE Edition"	Signature blades (using 1095 and 15N20 steel plates)	Bastard sword	April 21, 2021	0.72
In round 1, four smiths cut through steel cages (representing a WWE Hell in a Cell steel cage match) to retrieve 1095 and 15N20 steel plates used for their signature blades. In round 2, three smiths made handles from wooden weapons seen in WWE wrestling matches. The winner of round 3 received $10,000 and a WWE championship title belt. WWE Hall of Famer "The Nature Boy" Ric Flair makes a special guest appearance. Results: 1. Philip ("Sergeant Cheesebadger") 2. Hunter Copeland ("The Vulcan Viking") 3. Josh Patterson ("Black Rooster") 4. Nicholas Maiden ("Green River")
183	19	"Arctic Forge"	Ulu	Northern long seax	April 28, 2021	0.64
Using tools forged from pieces of mild steel, the smiths must retrieve high carbon steel ball bearings from ice blocks to make their ulus that were used by the Inuit in arctic climates for centuries. The smiths have to recreate their blades in an "arctic forge" in 27 degrees fahrenheit. Results: 1. Devon Chatterley 2. Clay Wolf 3. Andrew Cole Glaser 4. Chad Morton
184	20	"Civil War Battle"	Arkansas toothpick (using choice between grapeshot or cannonballs) (both high carbon steel)	General Grant's "Donelson Sword"	May 5, 2021	0.68
Results: 1. Isaac Gardner 2. Paul Sutt 3. Nathan Sistare 4. Trey Wright
185	21	"Casino Challenge"	Signature blade (using a choice Damascus pattern determined by a spin wheel)	Spin choice between Pandat, Boa-zande sword & Kelewang	May 12, 2021	0.67
For rounds 1 and 2, smiths get to gamble in the Forge Casino's game of cards in order to determine what type of challenge they get. In round 3, the two remaining smiths press their luck by spinning the "Wheel of Forging" to see what type of weapon to create. If they don't like where they land on the first spin, they can spin again, but in doing so, they will lose two hours of their total time at their home forges. Results: 1. Chris Gardner (Pandat) 2. Damond Clark (Boa-Zande) 3. Johnnie Cane 4. Alexander Davis
186	22	"Deadly Duo"	Signature Damascus san mai blade	Pair of Ginunting swords	May 19, 2021	0.66
In round 1, smiths are tasked with making a signature Damascus san mai blade with an 80CrV2 steel core inside a 1095 and 15N20 steel Damascus "sandwich". Round 2 showcased handle construction using two different materials on both sides of the blade. The remaining two smiths craft a pair of Ginunting swords at their home forges in round 3. Results: 1. Chris O'Brien 2. Bryan Salisbury 3. Max Smith 4. Steve Pyott
187	23	"Fire and Water"	Hwando (using W1 steel)	Woldo	May 26, 2021	0.61
The episode honors Korean bladesmithing heritage. In round 1, four smiths are assigned to forge a Korean hwando sword. For the first time in the show's history, the blades are not oil quenched, but water quenched, complementing the episode's yin and yang fire and water theme. The display piece was crafted by Forged in Fire season 7 episode 14 ("A Very Forged Christmas") champion and Korean-American Boyd Ritter, who also narrates the animated historical description of the weapon. For round 2, three contestants must add handles to their weapons, with a habaki being furnished. Round 3 sends the two finalists to their home forges to craft a Korean woldo polearm. Results: 1. Eric Himker 2. Dave Armor 3. Jimmy Riley 4. Martin Seck
188	24	"Sledgehammer Showdown"	Signature blade (using steel from a 10-pound sledgehammer)	Polish war hammer	June 9, 2021	0.72
Results: 1. Josh Fisher 2. Mike Baldino 3. Brian Hennes 4. Neil Warren
189	25	"Medieval Mystery Sword"	Signature blade (using random 'mystery' steel from inside different sized wooden crates)	Medieval Sword of Mystery	June 16, 2021	0.65
Results: 1. Cordale Whitfield 2. Larry Rhoades 3. Chris Halk 4. Dana Ryder
190	26	"Pick Your Poison"	Signature blade (using choice between various steel types and forging difficulties)	Burmese Dha	June 23, 2021	0.68
Before round 1 begins, the four bladesmiths choose from four tiers of challenges, using various steel types and forging difficulties presented to them on a table. Their choice also carries into the handle round. The smith's choices (in the order as called to pick) include: Caleb – Round 1: Fish hook canister; Round 2: Cast guard and pommel; Medium difficulty; Colin – Round 1: Turkish twist damascus; Round 2: G10 handle; Hardest difficulty; Tony – Round 1: Cube and stack canister; Round 2: 2-tone handle and mosaic pins; Hard difficulty; Cody – Round 1: 100+ layer pattern damascus; Round 2: Keyhole guard and handle; Easy difficulty; Results: 1. Tony Bravo 2. Colin Roy 3. Caleb Peck 4. Cody Kruseman
191	27	"Forge of Fear"	Signature blade (using choice of at least two tools)	Fireman's axe	June 30, 2021	0.65
The episode pays tribute to some of the most iconic terrifying horror scenes in cinematic history. In round 1, four bladesmiths are tasked in constructing weapons from metal items hanging on a "Wall of Torture" tools. In round 2, the remaining three smiths make handles from wooden tools found inside vampire hunting kits. A notable test for round three's fireman's axe was the "Horror Door Chop" strength test. The axes are used to chop through a door with "FORGED" written backwards in red along the central door frame rail. Both the axe chop and the backwards red lettering are references to the 1980 film The Shining. Results: 1. Jordan Jackson 2. Peter Farquhar 3. Bobby Slagle 4. James Hatfield
192	28	"The Terrifying Tuareg Takoba"	Signature blade (using hundreds of carbon-steel nails)	Tuareg Takoba	July 7, 2021	0.55
Results: 1. Joshua Kim 2. Dustin Mavity 3. Ben Graber 4. Calvin Hargis
193	29	"Barrel Full of Mystery"	Signature blade (using san mai technique)	Walloon sword	July 14, 2021	0.69
The smiths go through the "Pick of the Barrel" Challenge: a barrel with five different sources of mild steel (chains, pry bars, hammers, railroad spikes and horseshoes) attached to iron poles sticking out of the barrel. But what they can't see is what's actually inside the barrel. Attached to the poles are five different high-carbon steel which they have to make a blade out of. The easier the mild steel pick, the harder the high-carbon steel will be to use, and vice versa. Results: 1. Andrew Hall 2. Kade Daniels 3. Micah Duncan 4. Daniel Pantoja
194	30	"Armed Forces Tournament Part 1"	Duel 1: "E-4" (M1942 Machete using randomly picked steel & forge-welding technique)	Duel 2: "Two Branch" (WWII Air Force Survival Axe using 1095 & 15N20 steel with randomly picked forge-welding technique)	July 21, 2021	0.61
Eight military veterans who competed in The Forge are brought back for this season's Armed Forces Redeployment Tournament. This time, some of the best bladesmiths and toughest American warriors battle it out in four head-to-head duels. Eight former competitors and U.S. service members will be redeployed to The Forge, building a blade from start to finish in one five-hour round. During the duels, the bladesmiths pick 1 out of 5 different knife handles that are sticking out of an ammo crate. Attached to those handles are five unique blades from U.S. military history that the competitors must copy. The winner of each duel will take home a check for $2,000 and earn themselves a seat in the final battle of the tournament where they will face tough competition for a chance of winning $10,000 and the ever-coveted title of "Forged in Fire Champion". Duel 1: "E-4" bracket results: 1. Garrett Elting (Corporal; Marines) (S6 E12) 2. Robert Guest (Specialist; Army) (S6 E4) Duel 2: "Two Branch" bracket results: 1. Joe Stickel (Chief Master Sergeant; Army & Air Force) (S6 E11) 2. Dana Dupuis (Master Sergeant; Navy & Air Force) (S5 E36)
195	31	"Armed Forces Tournament Part 2"	Duel 3: "Champions" (Woodman's Pal survival axe using randomly picked steel & forge-welding technique)	Duel 4: "Sergeant" (M1915 Bolo Bayonet using randomly picked steel & forge-welding technique)	July 28, 2021	0.52
Duel 3: "Champions" bracket results: 1. Ethan Lee (Navy) (S6 E6) 2. Mike Rizzo (Army) (S8 E1) Duel 4: "Sergeant" bracket results: 1. Fermin Lopez (Sergeant, Black Hawk Combat Medic; Army) (S6 E10) 2. Joe Collett (Staff Sergeant; Air Force) (S3 E14)
196	32	"Armed Forces Tournament Finale"	Combat blade	"Ames" Cavalry Saber	August 4, 2021	0.53
In round 1, four bladesmiths, each winners of their respective duels, are tasked with creating their favorite combat blades. The blades are to be made from ball bearings, bandsaw blades, and fish hooks into a canister Damascus billet. Unfortunately, canisters are out of stock for the competition. Therefore, replica 1914 bazooka tubes are chopped up into needed canisters. Stacked leather handle parameters are added for round 2. For the final round, the two remaining bladesmiths recreate the "Ames" Cavalry Saber at their home forges. Results: 1. Fermin Lopez (Army) (S6 E10 & S8 E30) 2. Garrett Elting (Marines) (S6 E12 & S8 E29) 3. Ethan Lee (Navy) (S6 E6 & S8 E30) 4. Joe Stickel (Army & Air Force) (S6 E11 & S8 E29)
197	33	"Judges Takeover: Doug Marcaida"	Kortada knife (using 50-layered Damascus out of 1095 & 15N20 steel bars)	Kortada sword	December 8, 2021	0.57
In this special episode, the Judges; J, Dave, Doug, and Ben have a change not only to critique contestants blades, but create their very own challenge...in the Judges Takeover. For the first time in Forged In Fire history, in the next four weeks, the Judges will takeover The Forge by having the bladesmiths create their favorite weapons in their style and their favorite techniques. The Judges even get to test them out in the most brutal of tests. First up was Doug Marcaida who trained U.S. and Philippines RECON Marines with a Filipino Ginunting knife which the "Kortada" is designed from. Results: 1. Jason Coy 2. Trinity Troutt 3. Jeremy Vineyard 4. Erik Stevens
198	34	"Young Guns Challenge"	Signature blade (using metal from a trampoline)	German longsword	December 8, 2021	0.48
In this special episode, Forged In Fire brought back four of the series youngest bladesmiths to ever win the competition. These Champions age range from 18 as the youngest and 20 as the oldest to victory. Once again, these "Young Guns" will test their bladesmithing skills in The Forge and possibly be a two-time Forged In Fire Champion, a title first held by judge Ben Abbott. And for the first time in the show's history, all four smiths advanced to Round 2 and added handles to their signature blades. Handles were made from skateboard wood. After the handles were added and blades were tested, Round 2 saw a double elimination. Results: 1. Colton Arias (S7 E4) 2. Kevin Burgess (S7 E19) 3. Deke Parker (S6 E5) & Cade David Jenkins (S7 E20) 4. N/A
199	35	"Judges Takeover: Ben Abbott"	Billhook (using nickel, 1095 and mild steel)	Sutton Hoo Sword	December 15, 2021	0.65
Week 2 of the "Judges Takeover" is presented and led by Ben Abbott. Ben tasks the bladesmiths with forging a billhook, using pure nickel. As its first-time appearance on the show, nickel is to be used in a go mai (or "five layer") forging technique. In Round 2, the handle round, Ben wants the smiths to use a wood of their choice and incorporate a ferrule. For Round 3, Ben assigns the contestants to replicate the Sutton Hoo sword, which Ben also showcased and fabricated in season 8's "Judges' Home Forge Battle" special episode.: Note: The episode is dedicated to Ben Abbott's late father, Peter Abbott (1923–2016).; Results: 1. Josh Adams 2. Jarred Irby 3. Paul Elkins 4. Clayton Martin
200	36	"The Dark Side"	Signature blade (using steel from a guillotine)	Executioner's sword	December 15, 2021	0.53
This episode takes a look at the darker side of history. Bladesmiths have to forge weapons from a deadly device from the French Revolution. Those who make it to the final round must create a sword of death. Results: 1. Gunnar Wilbanks 2. Nathan Anderson 3. Don Clary 4. Christy Whittaker
201	37	"Judges Takeover: J. Neilson"	Serpentine push dagger (using ball bearings and a canister Damascus technique)	Maguindanao kris	December 22, 2021	0.74
This week's "Judges Takeover" features J. Neilson, who challenges the smiths to recreate his serpentine push dagger designed and fabricated specifically for the episode. With the canister Damascus technique being used, Neilson also adds the stipulation that the canister must be removed. For a Round 2 parameter, Judge Neilson wants the contestants to use burl wood for the handle. Results: 1. Dale Brannigan 2. John Blankman 3. Tyler Grantrodm 4. Wesley Crum
202	38	"Damascus 500"	Signature blade (using 1095 and 15N20 steel bars)	Mesopotamian sickle sword	December 22, 2021	0.63
This episode gives tribute to NASCAR in what is dubbed a "layer race". Four smiths are assigned to make a signature blade, forging the metal with as many damascus layers as possible in 3 hours. The smith that can forge a blade with the most layers gets an additional 30 minutes to their time in the handle round. Results: 1. Robert Taylor 2. Jacob Gaetz 3. Jeremy Bartlett 4. Aubrey Hummer
203	39	"Judges Takeover: Dave Baker"	"Bone Daddy" fantasy seax (using choice between canister or 50-layer Damascus)	Fantasy broadsword	December 29, 2021	0.76
The final week of "Judges Takeover", week 4, is presented and led by Dave Baker. In Round 1, Judge Baker requests the smiths to make a fantasy seax inspired by the iconic weapons in fantasy films of the 1980s. For the handle round, Dave's parameters include adding a button guard and an antler crown. Results: 1. Wade Plumlee 2. Jim Morrissey 3. Bob Clarke 4. Tyler Reinarts
204	40	"The Firangi Sword"	Signature blade (using any metal and any technigue)	Firangi sword	December 29, 2021	0.59
Rounds 1 and 2 are merged into one 5-hour fabricating round, the "Impress Us Challenge", which includes both metal forging and handle crafting. The contestants are able to use any metal composition (e.g. 15N20, 5160, 1095) from any source (e.g. bars, cables, coil springs) they choose to make their signature blade with any technique they desire. Anything found in the handle "pantry" is open to the smith's taking as well. The bladesmith that impresses the judges most at the end of the "Impress Us Challenge" is automatically eligible for the final round while the other three blades undergo testing. After testing, one smith will move on to the final round, with the other two contestants going home in a double elimination. Brandon's chopper-type blade impressed the judges most. Grant wins the testing sequence as both Chris and Evan are eliminated. Results: 1. Brandon Hyner 2. Grant Peters 3. Evan Daniel Purviance & Chris Gregory 4. N/A
205	41	"200th Episode: Fan's Choice"	Kukri (using a 200-layer Damascus technique)	Darb Sri Gun Chai (featured in season 7)	January 5, 2022	0.72
In honor and celebration of the show's fans and its 200th competition milestone, four bladesmiths fabricate weapons from fans' votes on various aspects of Forged in Fire—blade type and design, materials, forging techniques, challenges, and tests.: Round 1: The contestants must craft a kukri, which was decided by the fans' high 41% vote. Non-winning weapon options included a karambit and tomahawk. The kukri unveiled and showcased for the round was handcrafted by the season 1, episode 1 champion, Matthew Parkinson. Fans also voted 69% for a 200-layer Damascus. ("Salvaging steel from a dump truck" and "salvaging steel from heavy machinery & equipment" were the other material options.) Since Jimmy and Chris each forge exactly 200-layer Damascus blades per the fans' vote-winning parameter, both smiths get 30 minutes added to their times for Round 2.; Round 2: Utilizing the 200th episode theme, fans voted 50% for a 3-pin mosaic with the numbers 2-0-0 within the 3 pins, respectively, and designed into their handles. The non-winning challenges were "Etch '200' into blade" and "Salvage material from strength tests". In the testing portion of the round, fans voted 38% for the "Ice Block Chop" strength test. A "Rope Slice" with flaming rope was requested for the sharpness test.; Round 3: Bladesmiths are tasked with crafting a Darb Sri Gun Chai (45% fan vote) in 4 days. Other choices included the spadroon and hunga munga. In honor of the "KEAL" test, two of the judges' favorite ballistic gel dummies—Medusa and Dummy of the North—are slashed and beheaded. Next, a strength test incorporated the fan favorite "Skull Chop" with 6 animal skulls. Last, but not least, the blades were evaluated against a "Multiple Target Slice" sharpness test consisting of ballistics tubes, sand-filled tubes, watermelons, and plastic water-filled jugs.; Results: 1. Chris Moss 2. Jimmy Coronado 3. Michael Bizark 4.〈Tim Jane ("TJ")〉
206	42	"Beat the Unbeaten: Round One"	Signature blade (using rusted high-carbon steel)	Messer sword (featured in season 6)	January 12, 2022	0.85
Three bladesmiths create their signature blades in a single 5-hour round labeled the "Rust Bucket". During the 5 hours, rusted scrap steel (dumped from a rusted bucket) must be gathered and prepared, forged, tempered, quenched, and finished with a functional edge and handle. After testing, two smiths are sent home in a double elimination. The winner of the testing segment gets to pick the weapon style and forging technique. Brandon chooses the Messer sword and layered Damascus, then fabricates head-to-head against undefeated Judge Ben Abbott in an 8-hour round. Results: 1. **Ben Abbott** (S2 E9 & S3 E1) 2. Brandon Franklin 3. Andrew Swanger & Jesse Hatcher 4. N/A
207	43	"Beat the Unbeaten: Scrap Steel Challenge"	Signature blade (using scrap steel from previous competitions)	Irish ring-hilted sword (featured in season 5)	January 12, 2022	0.71
As the second competition within the "Beat the Unbeaten" Ben Abbott series, this episode showcases a new set of three bladesmiths tasked with building their signature blades in a 5-hour round. Some of the special parameters for the round include: materials must be sourced from the pile of scrap steel, any forge welding technique can be used, blades cannot be mono steel, 13- to 15-inch length, fully functional, and ready for testing after 5 hours. Zechariah does not meet the forge welded blade parameter as he only forge welds a bolster to his otherwise mono steel blade. Therefore, Zechariah is eliminated before testing begins. Jeremy is eliminated after testing, sending Rob into the final round against Ben Abbott. As the winner, Rob gets to pick the weapon style he and Ben craft, as well as the parameters. He chooses the Irish ring-hilted sword with ladder pattern Damascus. Results: 1. **Ben Abbott** (S2 E9, S3 E1, & S8 E41) 2. Rob Loveday 3. Jeremy Gonzales & Zechariah Nelson 4. N/A
208	44	"Beat the Unbeaten: Broken Blade Revenge"	Signature blade (using choice of sourced steel)	Chinese War Sword (featured in season 7)	January 19, 2022	0.85
In another "Beat the Unbeaten" challenge, three contestants (each with broken blades in previous episodes) build their signature blades in a single 5-hour round, using bandsaw blades, chainsaw blades, springs, ball bearings, and roller bearings. The blades are to be made from canister "No Can Can" Damascus in which the canister must be fully removed before the blade is finalized. Dorian does not fully remove the canister and is eliminated before testing; Chris is eliminated after testing; Caleb is the winner of the testing round. For the 8-hour final round against Ben Abbott, Caleb chooses the 2-handed Chinese warsword with an S-shaped guard and a pierced pommel, among other parameters. Caleb also chooses a random pattern Damascus steel forging technique. Since its Caleb's second appearance on the show, Ben gets to add a parameter twist: a minimum of 125 Damascus layer count. Results: 1. **Ben Abbott** (S2 E9, S3 E1, & S8 E41–42) 2. Caleb Ledford (S7 E29) 3. Chris Campbell (S7 E25) & Dorian Mosak (S7 E31) 4. N/A
209	45	"Beat the Unbeaten: Back for Revenge"	Signature blade (using techniques randomly chosen by the "Wheel of Forging")	Ida sword (featured in season 4)	January 26, 2022	0.79
Two bladesmiths from season 2 (both competing alongside Ben Abbott on Abbott's first appearance as a competitor) are invited back to try their luck at winning against Ben Abbott. The smiths are tasked with forging their signature blades in a single 5-hour round. The techniques each must use is randomly spun on the "Wheel of Forging". Brent lands the "Choose your own pattern Damascus" and picks the "twisted crushed W's" technique. Nathan lands "Raindrop pattern Damascus". In the testing portion, both blades break upon their first impacts. Brent's blade breaks at about mid-blade while Nathan's blade breaks at the handle. Since there is more useable blade left on his blade, Brent wins the round and competes against Abbott. As the winner, Brent chooses to recreate the Ida sword for the 8-hour final round. He also chooses the technique for the round—forged from stacks of 1095 and 15N20 steel, along with wrought iron chains, in a Damascus san mai. Abbott increases the difficulty by suggesting nickel be added, which tasks both smiths with Damascus go mai. Results: 1. **Ben Abbott** (S2 E9, S3 E1, & S8 E41–43) 2. Brent Stubblefield (S2 E9) 3. Nathan Zimmerman (S2 E9) 4. N/A
210	46	"Beat the Unbeaten: The Final Showdown"	Signature blade (using fish hook canister Damascus)	Spatha sword (featured in season 7)	February 2, 2022	0.73
In the fifth and final installment of the "Beat the Unbeaten" series, two bladesmiths (both with previous appearances on the show) compete by forging signature blades. The winner of the single 5-hour round gets to decide the final round's blade style and technique. After testing, Zach (Doug's pick) is sent home while Nicholas (Dave's pick) moves on to challenge Ben Abbott in the final round. Nicholas chooses the Spatha sword, using 1095 and 15N20 steel in a twist-and-stack Damascus technique. Since its Nicholas's second chance, Abbott gets to add a parameter—two twists for a total of four stacks of opposing twist-and-stack Damascus. Results: 1. **Ben Abbott** (S2 E9, S3 E1, & S8 E41–44) 2. Nicholas Cochiolo (S5 E31 & S5 E34) (Dave's pick) 3. Zach Tarbell (S8 E2) (Doug's pick) 4. N/A

=== Season 9 (2022) ===
No. in series	No. in season	Title	First weapon	Final weapon	Original release date	U.S. viewers (millions)
211	1	"Crushed Car Challenge"	Signature blade (using steel from a crushed car)	Curved Katars	March 30, 2022	0.40
Judges: J. Neilson, David Baker, Doug Marcaida Results: 1. Matthew Shairi 2. Mike Damaski 3. Dillon Wood 4. Jim Jernigan
212	2	"Blackout"	Signature blade (using W1 high-carbon steel without knowing the weapon tests ahead of time)	The Sword of Mercy	April 6, 2022	0.56
Judges: J. Neilson, David Baker, Doug Marcaida The smiths will be completely in the dark, both figuratively and literally with the "blackout" competition. The Forge will be completely dark with only oil lanterns used for light. They must make blades without the use of any electrical equipment, including no time clock. Results: 1. Ron Berkland 2. Sean Meadows 3. Dan Greene 4. J.D. Bostick
213	3	"The Ninja's Sword"	Light "skeletonize" ninja blade (using two ninja weapons: throwing stars, Sai, grappling hooks and nunchuck made from high-carbon steel)	Ninjato Sword	April 13, 2022	0.53
Judges: Ben Abbott, David Baker, Doug Marcaida The smith with the lightest blade after Round 1 gets an extra 20 minutes in Round 2. Results: 1. Jason Floyd 2. Brett South 3. Dave Bartley 4. Anthony Brogantic
214	4	"Sheet Metal Challenge"	Signature blade (using sheet metal in any technique)	Serrated Indian Saber	April 20, 2022	0.34
Judges: J. Neilson, David Baker, Doug Marcaida Results: 1. Ira Houseweart 2. Mark Smith 3. Andrew Slaughter 4. Brenden Bohannon
215	5	"Blades Gone Wild"	Sawback Machete (using high-carbon steel tent stakes)	Parang Nabur	April 27, 2022	0.32
Judges: J. Neilson, David Baker, Doug Marcaida Results: 1. Ben Secrist 2. Richard B. 3. Cheyenne Brown 4. Andrew Szocka
216	6	"Double Trouble Blades"	Two matching canister Damascus knives in signature style (using two small cube canisters and two types of high-carbon steel—ball bearings and fish hooks)	Cinquedea Sword	May 4, 2022	0.52
Judges: J. Neilson, David Baker, Doug Marcaida Results: 1. Cody Adolphson 2. Paul Rasp 3. Tim Huff 4. Gari Jimenez
217	7	"The Knife Fight"	Push dagger	"Fighter" knife	May 25, 2022	0.53
Judges: J. Neilson, David Baker, Doug Marcaida: Round 1: Bladesmiths come to the Forge floor with their own signature blades and go right into testing in the first ever Forged In Fire "Knife Fight". Four bladesmiths will enter, one will be eliminated. Bill Pyles: "Scrim-oowie" (Scimitar/Bowie) with retired fire hose handle, Thomas Franklin: Chef's Knife with micarta handle, Karri Rahkonen: Georgian Kinjal with bloodwood burl handle, and Rhys: Machete with Bocote handle.; Round 2: Two hours to make a push dagger (using 1095 and 15N20 high carbon steel forged into a Damascus billet).; Round 3: Six hours to (a) fix any problems with the push dagger and add a handle to it, and (b) use the san mai technique to recreate the "fighter" knife that was made by Forged In Fire Super Champion Collin Sage (featured in S7 E34).; Results: 1. Bill Pyles 2. Thomas Franklin 3. Karri Rahkonen 4. Rhys
218	8	"The Gaucho's Revenge"	Gaucho knife (Facon) (using a bar of 1084 high-carbon steel and 2 bars of mild steel in a san mai technique)	Argentinian Saber	June 1, 2022	0.61
Results: 1. Gary Graham 2. Eduardo Sol 3. Josh Langpit 4. Matt Aaron
219	9	"Sergeant Hayden's Sword"	Signature chopper (using only a sliver of 1095 high-carbon steel and rusty scrap steel for the rest)	Sargeant Hayden's Sword	June 8, 2022	0.46
Results: 1. Nathan Butcher 2. Stephanie Aiuto 3. Adam Till 4. Jason Lyle
220	10	"Revolutionary War Forge"	Rifleman's Knife	Continental Cavalry Saber	June 15, 2022	0.55
Judges: J. Neilson, David Baker, Doug Marcaida Smiths have to make a Continental rifleman's knife to match a given replica sample. Each smith has to choose from eight identical knapsacks of the kind that soldiers typically carried during the Revolutionary war. They do not know what is inside. Each knapsack contains a paper outlining the technique they must use for forging, with a selection of suitable steels. If they think what they have is too hard to do in the allotted time, they can choose a second knapsack, but are not allowed to return to their first choice, if the second also proves too difficult. In the second round, they have to fit their blades with a scroll guard and a handle with a hidden tang construction. In the last round, the two finalists have to make a Continental cavalry saber, that was based on an original British Army pattern, with a pierced stirrup guard and flattened pommel. Results: 1. Justin Hammond 2. Mike Lavallee 3. Robert Miller 4. Matt "G" Gaetano
221	11	"Flip the Forge"	Custom-styled Recurve knife (using their own parameters they chose from cards)	Dpa'dam (Tibetan Sword)	June 22, 2022	0.52
Four smiths participate in a competition called "flipping the script", where they will dictate everything about the challenge. Each will pick a card that has an attribute to their blade build that they will have complete control over. The smiths decide the weapon to forge and sets their own parameters. Type of blade: General Recurve. Blade parameters: 11 to 13 inches with a 2 inch width, 1½ thicknesses. Handle parameters: full tang with a mosaic pin and lanyard hole. Forging technique: Layered Damascus. Lastly, they determine the material used in the Strength Test, which antler bone was chosen. Results: 1. Josh Foran 2. Cliff Ivey 3. Jacie Cotterell 4. Bradey Peavy
222	12	"Out to Sea"	Blacksmith's knife (w/ a skeleton handle, using rusted metal that was fished out of the ocean)	Flensing knife (like the one on board the Charles W. Morgan the last wooden whaling ship in existence)	June 29, 2022	0.61
In this episode, The Forge moves to the Mystic Seaport Museum in Mystic, Connecticut where the competition goes back to blacksmithing of old. Three smiths craft from a coal forge just like they did for the many wooden ships still docked on site. Also on location is the James D. Driggs Shipsmith & Whalecraft Shop where blacksmiths and boatwrights fueled maritime history by crafting metal parts for the many vessels throughout the centuries. Results: 1. Felicia Howard 2. Jonathan Howe 3. Emilio Carbajal 4. N/A
223	13	"Gladiators of the Forge: Let the Battles Begin"	Event 1: Falx (using twisted Damascus)	Event 2: Spatha (using a Go Mai technique)	July 6, 2022	0.63
In honor of History's Colosseum series, the forge room is modified to mimic a "Roman gladiator arena". Two bladesmiths go head-to-head in a blade construction competition in ten events over the course of five episodes. The winner of an 8-hour smithing event has the option to continue to the next. As a competitor wins and chooses to advance through events, prize winnings increase up to a total value of $75,000. Event 1 Results: 1. Kurt Komyati ($5,000) 2. Alex Silverman Event 2 Results: 1. Kurt Komyati ($5,000) 2. Bryan Ledford
224	14	"Gladiators of the Forge: The Battles Continue"	Event 3: Kopis (using raindrop Damascus)	Event 4: Xiphos (using Damascus San Mai)	July 13, 2022	0.64
Event 3 Results: 1. Jesse Hu ($5,000) 2. Kurt Komyati (S9 E13) Event 4 Results: 1. Jesse Hu ($5,000) 2. Ben Banister
225	15	"Gladiators of the Forge: Vikings vs. Gladiators"	Event 5: Sica (using a 120-layer ladder pattern Damascus)	Event 6: Rhomphaia (using a Go Mai technique)	July 20, 2022	0.62
Event 5 Results: 1. Jesse Hu ($5,000) (S9 E14) 2. Eric Perrault Event 6 Results: 1. Jesse Hu ($5,000) (S9 E14) 2. Jason Moskalik
226	16	"Gladiators of the Forge: A Champion's Quest"	Event 7: Two matching Pugio daggers (using bicycle chain canister Damascus)	Event 8: Gladius (using ball bearing peeled canister Damascus)	July 27, 2022	0.71
In this particular "Gladiators of the Forge" episode, the forges are turned off after 5.5 hours. Event 7 Results: 1. Jesse Hu ($15,000) (S9 E14–15) 2. John Lachie Event 8 Results: 1. Jesse Hu ($5,000) (S9 E14–15) 2. Matt Brando
227	17	"Gladiators of the Forge: The Final Battles"	Event 9: Acinaces (using 1095 & 15N20 high-carbon steel in a 100-layer twisted Damascus)	Event 10: Dolabra (using any metal and technique)	August 3, 2022	0.57
In the fifth and closing episode of the "Gladiators of the Forge" series, the host and judges retake control of the weapon style choices, forging techniques, and parameters. For event 9, Eric returns and is given another chance to overthrow Jesse, the current reigning "Gladiator of the Forge". Jesse and Eric are tasked with fabricating an acinaces with an anthropomorphic hilt, among other parameters. Event 10 sees Kurt, a 2-time "Gladiator of the Forge" winner from the miniseries' first episode, back in action. Jesse and Kurt make a dolabra battle axe with a leather-wrapped handle. Event 9 Results: 1. Jesse Hu ($5,000) (S9 E14–16) 2. Eric Perrault (S9 E15) Event 10 Results: 1. Jesse Hu ($5,000) (S9 E14–16) 2. Kurt Komyati (S9 E13–14)
228	18	"Notorious Naga"	Signature blade (using 3 different types of steel in the Go Mai technique)	Naga sword	August 10, 2022	0.52
"Go Mai or Go Home" Challenge: The Smiths forge their signature blase in their favorite style using a 2-foot bar of mild steel, a 2-foot bar of 80CrV2 steel and a 2-foot bar of 15N20 steel with the Go Mai technique and a five layered pomel handle.: Note: Joseph "JoJo" Salyers' father, Billy, competed in S7 E9. They became the first father-son team to be "Forged In Fire Champions".; Results: 1. Joseph "JoJo" Salyers 2. Chris Smith 3. Todd Dekoda 4. Sherwin Farhang
229	19	"Fastest Blade in the West"	Mexican Bowie knife (using any steel from The Forge's pantry)	Vaquero Machete	August 17, 2022	0.59
"The Fastest Blade in the West" Challenge: Inspired by the Mexican cowboys or Vaqueros of the old west, the four Smiths will forge a Mexican Bowie knife in 3 hours or less with any steel from the pantry Since this challenge is about speed and accuracy, the goal is to get their blades inside an empty sheath before them. The first Smith to do so, will have an extra 30 minutes to make a handle in the second round of competition. The runner-up will get an extra 15 minutes. And the last Smith will get 15 minutes deducted from their time.: Note: Times are as follows: McClure (2 hrs, 15 mins), Finch (2 hrs, 45 mins), Jarrett (2 hrs, 47 mins), Payne (2 hrs, 55 mins); Results: 1. Erich Finch 2. Gregory McClure 3. Nathan Payne 4. L.J. Jarrett
230	20	"Best in Damascus"	Signature blade (using choice of 1095, 15N20, 80CrV2, nickel, and copper in a layered Damascus)	Kilij (featured in season 5)	August 24, 2022	0.50
The bladesmiths must bring their creativity during the "Best in Damascus" competition, where they have to forge a unique Damascus pattern completed weapon in only 5 hours. Whichever bladesmith impresses the judges the most gets to skip the testing round and goes directly into the final round. They also will get to choose the weapon from the Forged In Fire vault to build, again using a high amount of Damascus layers and a stunning pattern. Results: 1. Ryan Searles 2. Matt Roberts 3. Jason Dingledine 4. Abram Perry
231	21	"Friend or Foe"	Scottish broadsword (using choice of material and technique)	Kindjal (using any Damascus pattern)	August 31, 2022	0.53
In this episode, two pairs of blacksmiths are given their introductions, tasks, and parameters, then immediately sent to their home forges to fabricate Scottish broadswords. Over the course of four days, each pair works together to craft their blades. Weapons testing takes place in the Forge, with the losing pair going home. For the final 5-hour round, the winning pair is split. Now, the former team members individually compete for the "Champion of the Forge" title.: Note: Josh Hardman's father, Ron Hardman, and sister, Jessica Hardman, were both featured in S7 E12's "Family Edition". Ron won the competition and was crowned "Champion of the Forge", while Jessica finished in third place.; Results: 1. Max Harder 2. Josh Hardman 3. Dan Lewis & Tony Lewis 4. N/A
232	22	"Supersized: Sword"	Signature blade (using steel from railroad rail)	Grutte Pier's sword	October 5, 2022	0.47
In this special "Supersized" installment, four bladesmiths are assigned to make their signature blades (15 to 17 inches) from 7-feet of railroad track made of hardened steel. Those who move on will include a handle made from a 6x6 pine beam for testing. In the final round, the last two smiths are challenged to make a massive nearly 7-foot sword that was once welded by pirate Grutte Pier from the Netherlands. His sword can be seen on display in the Fries Museum. Results: 1. Michael Dillon 2. John Simons 3. Mark Howland 4. Matt Coda
233	23	"Supersized: Elephant Swords"	Signature blade (using 5160 steel from two 250-lb coil springs, forged into a san mai billet)	Pair of elephant fighting swords (Dhaab Ngao)	October 12, 2022	0.42
In the second "Supersized" installment, four bladesmiths are assigned to make their signature blades from 2-inch diameter, 250-lb coil springs with a san mai technique. After the 3-hour forging round is complete, the three remaining metalworkers make any necessary blade corrections and fabricate wooden handles from logs. The third and final round sees two smiths building two elephant fighting swords at their respective home forges. Results: 1. Josh Meyer 2. Rob Harvey 3. Clay Unruh 4. Eland Green
234	24	"Supersized: 5 Ton Challenge"	Signature blade (using material from a 5-ton pile of assorted scrap metals)	Friauler spiess polearm	October 19, 2022	0.53
Continuing with the Supersized theme, four smiths must make their signature blades by sourcing steel so massive that it was unable to fit through the bay doors inside The Forge. Outside, a dump truck filled with 5 tons of scrap metal—some steel, some not—dumps random pieces on the ground. In the second round, those who move on need to craft their handles with handle material from the junkyard. For the final, the two remaining have to re-create the largest blade in Forged In Fire history. Results: 1. David Warner 2. James Dean (like the late actor) 3. Robert Shea 4. Jason Brigli
235	25	"Forged in Fire: Marvel's Midnight Suns"	Blade's glaive (using any steel and any technique)	The Hunter's iconic blades	October 26, 2022	0.44
Three smiths compete in a two-round contest inspired by the video game Marvel's Midnight Suns. In the first round, they are given five hours to forge Blade's double-ended glaive, and must each draw a special Marvel character card to determine additional restrictions or benefits while they work. After one smith is eliminated, the remaining two proceed to the final round and is presented by Jacob Soloman, Marvel's Midnight Suns Creative Director of Firaxis Games to re-create The Hunter's long and short swords at their home forges. Results: 1. Jessie Whipperman 2. Paul Leal Jr. 3. Luke Terry 4. N/A
236	26	"Supersized: Hog Wild"	Hog splitter (using a 12-pound bar of W1 steel)	Japanese great sword	November 2, 2022	0.41
In the next installment of the Supersized challenge, four smiths make Forged In Fire history when they have to forge the largest opening round blade; the Hog Splitter, weighing 4 pounds. If their blades don't break during a rigorous testing, they have to re-create the massive Japanese great sword in their home forges. Results: 1. Ian Zimmerman 2. Austin Frakes 3. Jason Knox 4. Robert Lallier

=== Season 10 (2023–2024) ===
No. in series	No. in season	Title	First weapon	Final weapon	Original release date	U.S. viewers (millions)
237	1	"On the Road: Texas Showdown"	Signature blade (using layers of 1075 and 15N20 high-carbon into a 300-layered Damascus)	ABS Master Smith quillon (dagger) short sword	October 4, 2023	N/A
For this season, Forged in Fire is going on the road and bringing the competition (tournament-style) to the best bladesmiths in their home forges in every state in the country. Each week, one of the judges will travel to the nation's top forges to put their "local-style" to the test and pick the winning smith to come back to the show's own 'Forge' where they battle for $20,000 for themselves and $10,000 in forging equipment for their local forge shop. In this episode, Forged in Fire traveled to Texarkana, Texas where judge J. Nielsen chose the world-renowned Bill Moran School of Bladesmithing at Texarkana College. Not only is it the oldest smithing school in the world, its owner and namesake founded the American Bladesmith Society and revived the long-lost art of Damascus. Results: 1. Jake Anstaett 2. Chris Julian 3. Jaymes Stevens
238	2	"On the Road: Montana Face-Off"	Froe (using 4140 round stock steel)	Double Bit Felling Axe	October 4, 2023	N/A
Three more smiths are put to the test for a place in the tournament. Forged in Fire visits the remote New Agrarian School in the wilderness of Bigfork, Montana chosen by judge Dave Baker for its resourcefulness in making all kinds of tools. It is home to some of America's best blacksmiths. Results: 1. Silas Maddox 2. Peter Haarklou 3. Brian Gosling
239	3	"On the Road: Appalachian Showdown"	Blacksmith's knife with an ornate handle (blade and handle are forged from a single piece of metal) (using W1 round stock steel)	Four-tined pitchfork	October 11, 2023	N/A
Forged in Fire travels to the heart of the Appalachian Mountains for judge Ben Abbott's pick, the world-renowned Clay Spencer Blacksmith Shop (home of the John C. Campbell Folk School) in Brasstown, North Carolina. Known for the region's knife-making, the school refines itself in making blades and farm tools with functionality and beauty. It is also where some of the country's top metalworkers call it home. Results: 1. Jason Bivens 2. Jesse Bolding 3. Cole Recchia
240	4	"On the Road: Kalamazoo Combat"	William Shakespeare's Lady Macbeth dagger (using choice from various steel grades)	Macbeth's Sword	October 18, 2023	N/A
It is time for the final judge's school selection as Forged in Fire pays a visit to Doug Marcaida's pick, Combat Ready Art in Kalamazoo, Michigan, a thriving art-rich community. Represented by owner/instructor, and lead blacksmith Jon Reeves, this facility specializes in stage and theater combat weapons. Results: 1. Blake Maddox 2. Jackson Scythe 3. Breanna Lanier
241	5	"On the Road: American Champion"	Signature blade (using choice of metal grades and sources, but a forge welding technique)	Moplah sword	October 25, 2023	N/A
It is time for the final and to find out which one of the judges' picks will win the ultimate Forged in Fire American champion competition. Four smiths who were victorious at their local forges will battle it out on The Forge floor for a chance to win $20,000 for themselves and bring home an extra $10,000 in forging gear for their smithing school. Results: 1. Jason Bivens (John C. Campbell Folk School/Ben's pick) 2. Silas Maddox (New Agrarian School/Dave's pick) 3. Jake Anstaett (Bill Moran School of Bladesmithing/J's pick) 4. Blake Maddox (Combat Ready Art/Doug's pick)
242	6	"The Frankenstein Challenge"	Signature blade (using chopsaw "cut-offs" of steel and failed wood handles)	Crusader Bible Falchion	November 1, 2023	N/A
Four smiths must "Frankenstein" together discarded pieces of scrap steel with delaminations or bad-forge welds from past competitions over the years to make their signature blades using the Damascus technique. Results: 1. Benjamin Bays 2. Travis Halling 3. Erick Greiner 4. Stanley Yee
243	7	"Chef's Special"	Chef's knife (using round stock of W1 high-carbon steel, and must have a hamon)	Hog splitter	November 8, 2023	N/A
Four smiths get cooking when they're challenged to make a chef's knife. During the first portion of the competition, Chef Plum, professional chef and host of PBS' Restaurant Road Trip will test their chef's knives for functionality on the cutting board. Results: 1. Willow Zietman 2. Matthew Sweeney 3. Cody Santos 4. Kayan Cajudo
244	8	"Springtime for Napoleon"	Signature blade (using steel springs)	Napoleonic presentation sabre	November 15, 2023	N/A
Results: 1. Henry Walker 2. Brendon Andreski 3. Matt Danielson 4. Dotti Derry
245	9	"Instruments of Death: Masters of the Siege"	Battering ram with wheels and a forged element	Ballista with 8 bolts with hand-forged tips	October 2, 2024	N/A
Forged in Fire returns for an eleventh season and it ups the ante when four teams of expert smiths featuring all different kinds of skill sets must recreate siege weapons. In this challenge, they must build the biggest, most complex, and terrifying weapons of war ever seen on the battlefield (such as battering rams, ballistas, and war hammers) from history's past. These are the most difficult and deadly weapons seen on the series. The strongest and most powerful builds will earn $20,000 and the title of "Instruments of Death" Champions. To determine which team moves on to the siege rounds, four teams of three will have their war hammers tested by the judges in a gauntlet style objects course. Results: 1. The Flying Monkeys: Daniel Fagergren, Kory Heaton, Brad Grosbeck 2. Sawdust and Sparks: Jared, Rich, Brandon 3. The Ther-mighties: Mark, Freeland, Eli 4. Thru-Tang Clan: Josh, Coleman, Chace
246	10	"Beat the Unbeaten: Mastering the Mystery"	Signature blade (using 80CRV2 high-carbon steel in canister Damascus in San Mai style)	Medieval Sword of Mystery (from S8) (must say "Forged in Fire" on it using raindrop Damascus)	October 9, 2024	N/A
The inaugural "Beat the Unbeaten Championship" is underway as bladesmiths Jay Repologle (S3) battles Trevor Jenkinson (S7) in round one, forging their signature blades. When only one moves on to the second round, they get a chance to beat one of the unbeaten judges, Ben Abbott who was selected by the panel. A weapon was chosen by Jay from the Forged in Fire Vault from past challenges. Results: 1. Ben Abbott (S2 E9, S3 E1, & S8 E41–45) 2. Jay Repogle (S3 E30) 3. Trevor Jenkinson (S7 E5) 4. NA
247	11	"Beat the Unbeaten: Conquering the Kachin Dao"	Signature blade (using the crate's pick of steel and style)	Kachin dao (using Damascus San Mai technique)	October 16, 2024	N/A
The Beat the Unbeaten Championship continues as two different bladesmiths, John Wigger (S5 Ep.37) and Eric Finch (S9 Ep. 19) battle it out in the "Crazy Crates Challenge". They must choose a wooden crate not knowing what's inside. Once chosen, the mystery crate will tell them the steel they must use and the technique. In Round 2, one will battle "Gladiator of the Forge Champion" Jesse Hu (S9 Ep. 14-16) who is 8-0. Results: 1. Jesse Hu (S9 E14-16) 2. Eric Finch (S9 E19) 3. John Wigger (S5 E37) 4. N/A
248	12	"Beat the Unbeaten: A Cutlass Above"	Signature blade (using the high-carbon steel bars in the San Mai technique)	M1917 Naval Cutlass (from season 5 using a ladder pattern Damascus)	October 23, 2024	N/A
In round one, two bladesmiths go head-to-head in "The Forge of Mystery Challenge". Three bars are high-carbon steel while the other three are mild steel. They must figure out which steel to use for the blade's edge by a series of tests. In round two, Steve Koster squares off against Collin Sage in an eight-hour competition of unbeatens. Steve was eliminated before his weapon was tested for failing to meet two of the parameters given before the start. Note: This was the first time a competitor walked off the forge floor in anger, contesting the rules. Results: 1. Collin Sage (S5 E5 & S7 E34) 2. Steve Koster (S6 E7) 3. Chris Moss (S8 E40) 4. NA
249	13	"Beat the Unbeaten: Off the Hook"	Film-inspired blade (using canister Damascus)	Kelewang (using a chevron Damascus pattern)	October 30, 2024	N/A
Round one plays tribute to a Hollywood themed competition featuring weapons on the Red Carpet: Arya Starks' "Needle" from Game of Thrones, Iñigo Montoya's sword from The Princess Bride, Robin Hood's bow from Robin Hood Prince of Thieves, and the fire fighter's axe from The Shining. The smith must pick any one of these and make a weapon that's inspired by it. Boyd makes a Kukuri inspired by Final Fantasy The Kingsglavie Ryan designs an Elvish sword inspired by Lord of the Rings In Round two, Ryan faces a "Titan of the Forge", Ben Abbott with the highest undefeated record at 10-0. Ryan picks a weapon in the vault, the Malaysian kelewang. Results: 1. Ben Abbott 2. Ryan Searles (S9 E20) 3. Boyd Ritter (S7 E14) 4. N/A
250	14	"Beat the Judges: Test of the Best"	Ginunting sword (using high-carbon steel fishhooks in canister Damascus)	Parang Nabur (using their choice of Damascus)	November 6, 2024	N/A
The competition shifts to beating the judges challenge. In round one, Forged in Fire celebrates different international cultures and people. Two unbeaten bladesmiths must recreate weapons from all around the world. This episode's challenge showcases weapons from the Philippines. Only one smith can move on to the next round to face one of the judges. Results: 1. Dave Baker 2. Walter Baranowski (S8 E3) 3. James Welker (S8 E5) 4. N/A
251	15	"Beat the Judges: Machete Master"	Jambiya (using steel from layered or canister Damascus with an ornate hourglass handle)	Vaquero Machete (using canister Damascus with a pommel featuring an eagle or a horse-head)	November 13, 2024	N/A
In tound one, Alex Ruiz (season 5 champion) goes head-to-head with Dave Parthemore (2x tournament champion) They must build a blade that originated in Yemen and since has become one of the most popular weapons in the Middle East; the jambiya. In round Two, Alex takes on J. Nielson as the "Wheel of Weapons" decides what country their weapon comes from. It selects the Vaquero Machete from Mexico (seen in season 9). Results: 1. J. Nielsen 2. Alex Ruiz 3. Dave Parthemore 4. N/A
252	16	"Beat the Judges: Tackling the Tizona"	Bowie knife (with an S-guard and a mosaic pin, using steel from a piece of railroad)	Tizona (using salvaged materials from a bucket in the Forge's pantry)	November 20, 2024	N/A
In round one, Gunner Wilbanks, returning champion from season 8 takes on John Phillips, the champion from season 6. As Forged in Fire continues to pay homage to cultures and weapons around the world, this episode's challenge is keeping it close to home. The smiths must create an American iconic knife. The one smith who makes it to round two will face Dave Baker. The "Wheel of Weapons" is back and it picks El Cid's weapon of choice; the Spanish Tizona. Results: 1. Dave Baker 2. Gunner Wilbanks 3. John Phillips 4. N/A
253	17	"Beat the Judges: Shamshir Showdown"	Pichangatti (using any type of steel in any method of Damascus)	Shamshir (with a bird's break shaped handle using different types of guard stock of steel)	November 21, 2024	N/A
Two returning champions battle it out in round one; Nicholas Marcelja, the champion from season 4, episode 2 and Ira Houseweart, champion from season 9. They are tasked with building an ornate knife from India. In the second round, one smith takes on the most celebrated judge with the most wins at 12-0, Ben Abbott. The "Wheel of Weapons" lands on Iran's oldest Persian sword from the Ottoman Empire. Could this be the end of Ben's 12 consecutive win streak? Results: 1. Ira Houseweart 2. Ben Abbott 3. Nicholas Marcelja 4. N/A

=== Season 11 (2025) ===
No. in series	No. in season	Title	First weapon	Final weapon	Original release date	U.S. viewers (millions)
254	1	"Champion's Cup: Quest for Glory"	TBA	TBA	August 6, 2025	N/A
In the season opener, three past winning bladesmiths return to The Forge for a shot at the Champion's Cup, forging their name in Forged in Fire history. Results: 1. 2. 3. 4.
255	2	"Champion's Cup: Survival of the Fittest"	TBA	TBA	August 13, 2025	N/A
Another set of three smiths come back for a chance to become a two-time winner. Results: 1. 2. 3. 4.
256	3	"Champion's Cup: Hunt for Victory"	TBA	TBA	August 20, 2025	N/A
Three bladesmiths return for a chance to join the elite club for two-time winners in the Champion's Cup. Results: 1. 2. 3. 4.
257	4	"Siberian Forge"	Yakut knife	TBA	August 27, 2025	N/A
In this chilly challenge, four bladesmiths must battle freezing temperatures to turn snowflake canister Damascus into a Siberian Yakut knife. Results: 1. 2. 3. 4.
258	5	"The Melting Point"	Cumai Knife (blade in their style, using 5 layers, 1095, copper, 1095, copper, and 1095)	Vietnamese two handed sword (Guom Truong); Requirements include a tsuba style guard, habaki, ferrule, butt cap, with a length of 36-38".	August 27, 2025	N/A
The competition heats up as four smiths must use copper, a metal never before seen in Forged in Fire history. Known for its tight forging timetable, the competitors have to pay close attention to their forges or they risk melting their blades. Results: 1. Taylor Mathews 2. Matthew Martin 3. Jasper Herr 4. Brock Woodson
258	6	"Damascus Go Mai Challenge"	TBA	Sidesword	September 3, 2025	N/A
The competition get more technical when four smiths must create blades using the two most difficult techniques; Damascus and Go Mai. In the next round, the remaining two head home to create an intricate 16th century sidesword. Results: 1. 2. 3. 4.
259	6	"Pimp My Knife"	"Pimped Out" Machete	"Photo Sword"	September 10, 2025	266k
In this pimp my knife challenge, four bladesmiths must put their design skills when they create "pimped out" machete. In round two, the remaining smiths go back to their home forges to make history's original pimped out weapon the Photo Sword. Results: 1. Trevor Barret 2. Russell 3. Jeff Schafer 4. Preston
260	7	"Junkyard Meltdown"	TBA	TBA	September 17, 2025	N/A
Four bladesmiths are tasked with building a signature Damascus blade out of a pile of junk from a junkyard. In round two, the ones who moved on head back home to re-create a Broadsword that features a snake-shaped grind. Results: 1. 2. 3. 4.
261	8	"Forged Flashbacks"	TBA	TBA	September 24, 2025	N/A
Forged in Fire dives deep into its history vault and revisits some of the most special competitions over its ten seasons. From Hollywood, horror to holidays and Greeks to Gladiators, these are a few of the best challenges. Results: 1. 2. 3. 4.

=== Season 12 (2026) ===
No. in series	No. in season	Title	First weapon	Final weapon	Original release date	U.S. viewers (millions)
265	1	"Mind Over Metal"	Signature blade	TBD	July 1, 2026	N/A
This season, Forged in Fire is back to traditional competition with three smiths competing against each other but with a twist. Vying to win money after each challenge, after the two rounds, all three head back to their home forges to recreate the serrated Dussage weapon. Results: 1. 2. 3.
266	2	"Two Faced Challenge"	TBA	TBA	July 8, 2026	N/A
Four bladesmiths are given the challenge of forging a Damascus blade out of not only one, but two billets. Results: 1. 2. 3. 4.
267	3	"J. Neilson's Secrets of the Forge"	TBA	TBA	July 15, 2026	N/A
In this special inside look episode, Forged in Fire Judge J. Neilson, the notorious "blade breaker", reveals his own secrets within The Forge. Results: 1. 2. 3. 4.
268	4	"Can With A Plan"	268	4	July 22, 2026	N/A
In order to move onto the next round, four bladesmiths are put to the test when they are tasked with using three different steels to forge a canister Damascus blade. Results: 1. 2. 3. 4.
269	5	"Top Ten Miltary Blades"	TBA	TBA	July 29, 2026	N/A
On this special episode, Forged in Fire honors the brave men and women in the military by celebrating the many weapons that bladesmiths have created on the show's seasons that shaped America's 250 years of history.

== Specials ==
=== Forged in Fire ===
No. in series	No. in season	Title	Original release date	U.S. viewers (millions)
SP1	Special–1	"Judges' Home Forge Battle"	December 30, 2020	0.90
In a 2020 home quarantine special filler episode, two months are taken up with the three bladesmith judges while they are at home. Each judge forges a blade over a fortnight at his home forge and tests the finished product himself, all the while being his own camera crew (which J. Neilson's wife, Beckie, complains about). Ben Abbott forges a replica Sutton Hoo pattern-welded sword, supposedly belonging to King Raedwald. J. Neilson forges a competition chopper with both canister Damascus and san mai techniques. David Baker makes a basket-hilted sword with a Damascus steel blade and a historical recreation of a 12-piece decorated basket.

=== Forged in Fire: Best of & Championship Weapons ===
On November 24, 2021, a "Best of..." (BO) sequence was started with season 8's "Bladesgiving" episode and continued into season 9.

In the "Championship..." series, Dave Baker presents his favorite weapons (various types and origins) featured in championship rounds from previous episodes.

No. in series	No. in season	Title	Original release date	U.S. viewers (millions)
BO1	Special–1	"Bladesgiving"	November 24, 2021	0.43
The judges remember their favorite blades in the Thanksgiving special episode.
BO2	Special–2	"Championship Long Swords"	March 30, 2022	0.54
In this special episode, Dave Baker's reveals his favorite long swords that were featured on Forged In Fire: The Scottish Claymore, Zweihänder, Fabyle Flyssa, The Indian Two-Handed Sword, and The Ida.
BO3	Special–3	"Championship Weapons of China"	April 6, 2022	0.42
Dave Baker presents five favorite Chinese weapons that have appeared in Forged in Fire championship rounds—butterfly swords (featured in season 3), hook sword (featured in season 3), deer horn knives (featured in season 4), tai chi sword (featured in season 4), and Chinese Dao (featured in season 5).
BO4	Special–4	"Strongest Championship Weapons"	April 13, 2022	0.44
In this special episode, Dave Baker looks back at some of the most iconic and deadliest weapons that were welded by the strongest warriors in history. Five of them were made by Forged in Fire's bladesmiths, including the Nagamaki, Knightly Poleaxe, Glaive Guisarme, Scottish Claymore, and the Zweihänder.
BO5	Special–5	"Championship Weapons of Africa"	April 20, 2022	0.53
In this special episode, Dave Baker takes a look at the most fascinating weapons of Africa that were featured on Forged in Fire. The five deadliest African blades made by some of the best smiths are the Ngombe Ngulu (Executioner's Sword), the Sengese, the Ida, the Shotel, and the Iklwa.
BO6	Special–6	"Championship Axes"	April 27, 2022	0.54
In this special episode, Dave Baker remembers his favorite axes featured on Forged in Fire. The four championship axes are, the Nzappa Zap, the Tabar-Shishpar, the Horseman's Axe, and the Tabar.
BO7	Special–7	"Championship Daggers and Knives"	May 4, 2022	0.43
In this special episode, Dave Baker takes a look at his favorite daggers and knives that were featured on Forged in Fire: The Katar, the Haladie, the Navaja, and the Nepalese Kukri.
BO8	Special–8	"Championship Curved Blades"	May 25, 2022	0.36
In this special episode of Forged In Fire, Dave Baker takes a look back at some of the best curved blades made on the show. The five epic curved weapons are: the Rhomphaia, the Talwar, the Katana, and the Hussiar Saber.
BO9	Special–9	"Championship Short Swords"	June 1, 2022	0.38
In this special episode of Forged In Fire, Dave Baker features his favorite short swords that were created in The Forge. The five sensational short swords are: the Sica Sword, the Roman Gladius, the Yatagan, the Cutlass, and the Xiphos.
BO10	Special–10	"Championship Throwing Weapons"	June 8, 2022	0.32
In this special episode, Dave Baker takes a look at the top throwing weapons that were featured on Forged in Fire: the Chakram, the Kpinga, the Pipe Tomahawk, the Zande Spear, and the Viking Battle Axe.
BO11	Special–11	"Championship Supersized Weapons"	June 15, 2022	0.43
In this special episode, Dave Baker relieves five of his favorite championships featuring ultimate super-sized weapons or polearms, which includes: the German Halberd, the Jumonji Yari, the Glaive Guisarme, the Qinglong Ji, and the Bardiche.

=== Forged in Fire: Cutting Deeper ===
No. in series	Title	Original release date	U.S. viewers (millions)
1	"Night of Redemption"	March 28, 2017	N/A
2	"Night of Champions"	April 4, 2017	N/A
3	"Judges' Picks Night"	May 14, 2017	N/A
4	"Fan Choices Night"	May 21, 2017	N/A
5	"Fan Favorites Night"	May 25, 2017	N/A
6	"Champions Night"	July 4, 2017	N/A

=== Forged in Fire: Meet the Judges ===
No. in series	Title	Original release date	U.S. viewers (millions)
1	"Forged in Fire: Meet the Judges"	May 13, 2020	N/A
Forged In Fire judges J. Neilson, Dave Baker, and Doug Marcaida are in the "hot seat" as fans ask them questions about the show, their personal lives, and bladesmithing techniques.

== See also ==
- Forged in Fire accolades
- Notable contestant achievements
- List of martial arts weapons
- Weapon
