= Sanmai =

Sanmai may refer to:

- Sanmai (cicada), an extinct genus of cicadas
- San mai, blade-making technique
