= Haladie =

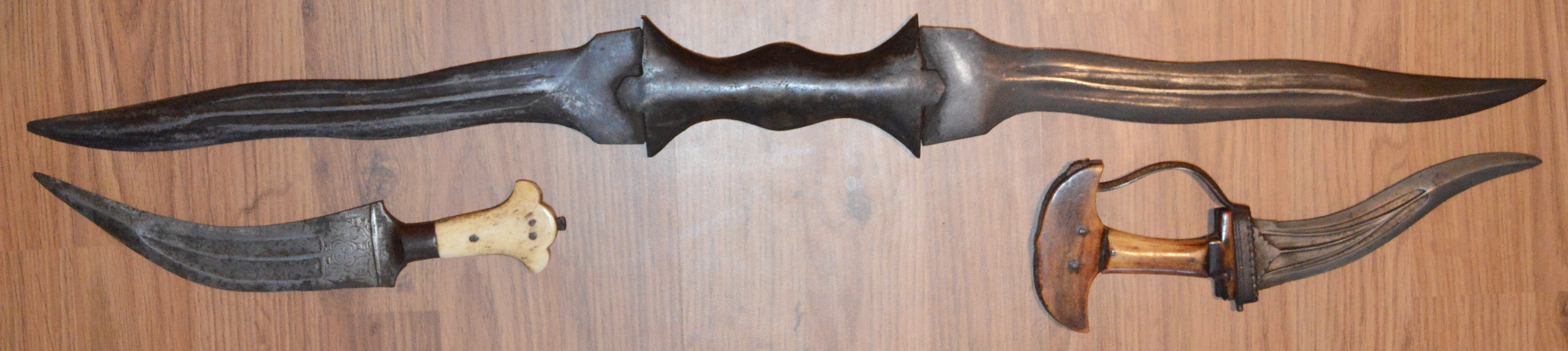
- Indian haladie, 18th to 19th c, a steel parrying weapon, 31.75 inches (80.6 cm) long with 13 inches (33 cm) blades. Shown next to a khanjali and a tiger tooth jambiya for size comparison.
- Type: Blade
- Place of origin: India and Syria

Service history
- Used by: Rajputs

The haladie is a double-edged dagger from ancient India, consisting of two curved blades, each approximately 8.5 inches (22 cm) in length, attached to a single hilt.

The weapon was used by warriors of the Indian Rajput clans, and was both a stabbing and slicing blade. Some haladie had spikes on one side of the handle in the style of a knuckle duster, while others had a third blade in this position. In some cases the main blades would be serrated.

Eventually, the haladie began to be used outside of India, most notably in Syria.

The haladie is believed to be one of the world's first triple-edged blades.

== See also ==
- Willow Leaf Knives are two sided throwing knives that can be curved or straight. Designed exclusively for ranged combat they look almost like haladie without the handle.
