= Sengese =

A sengese is a throwing knife of the Matakam from northeastern Nigeria or northern Cameroon.

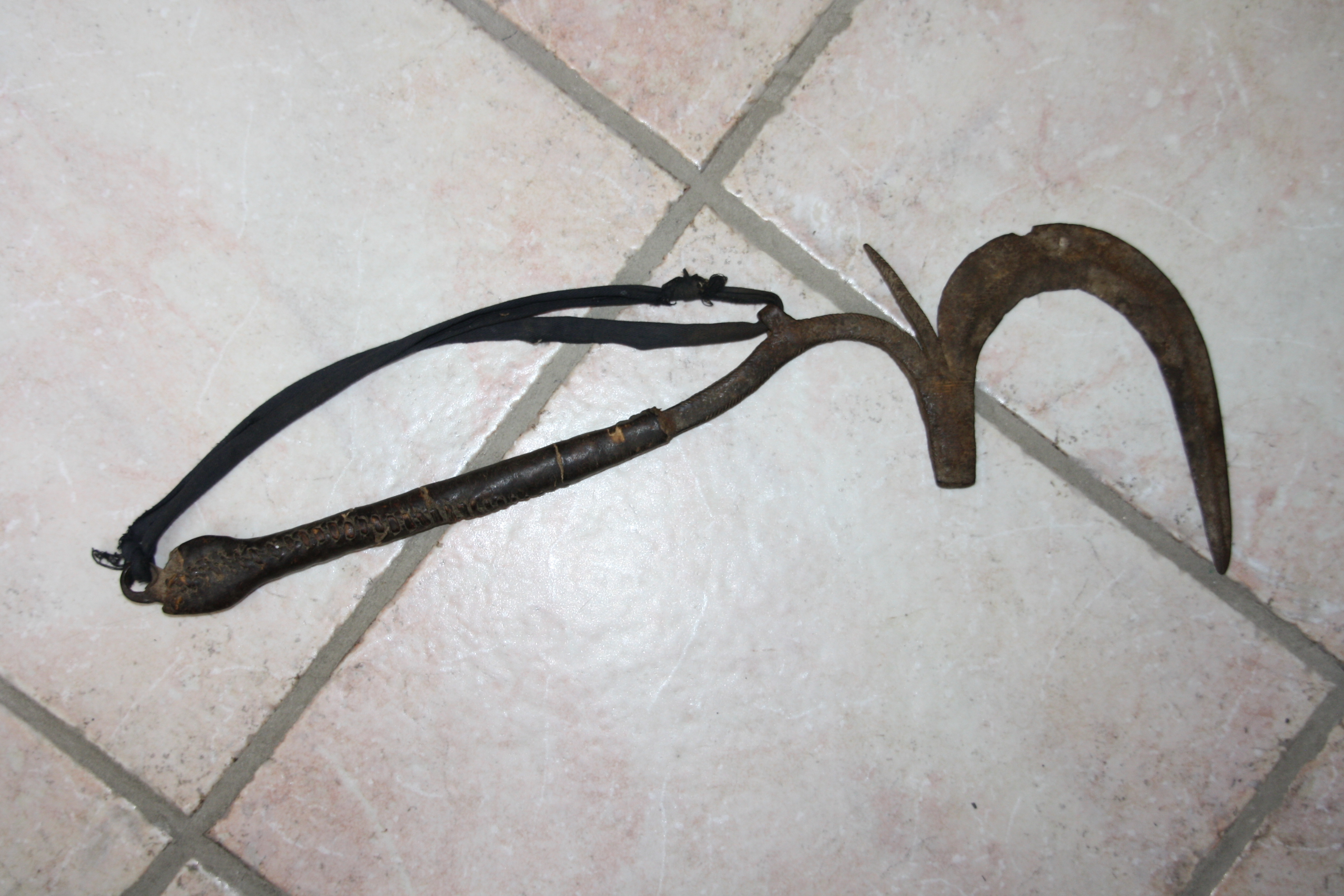
Sengese from Cameroon

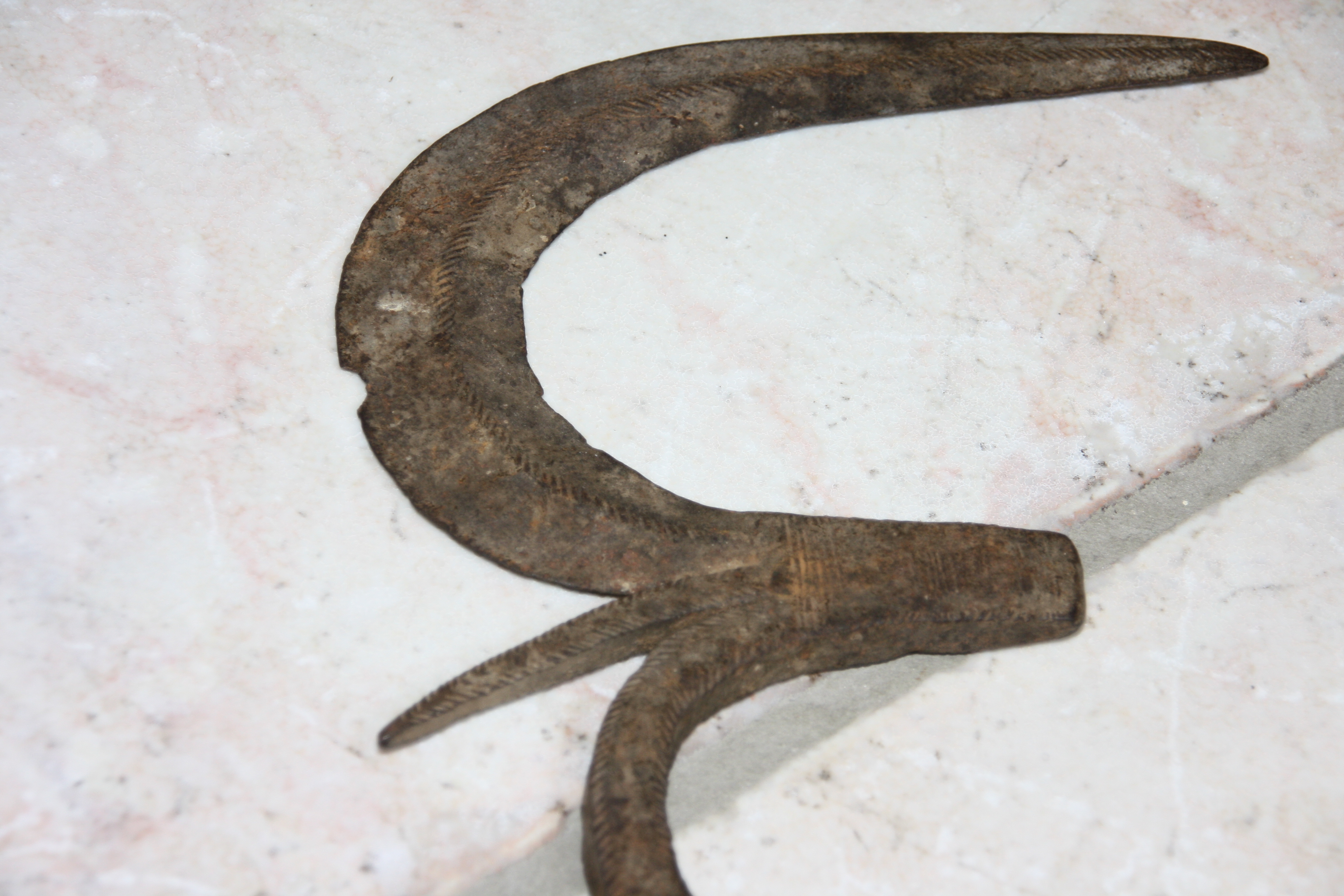
Sengese blade

== Uses ==
It is sinuous in shape and its handle is often dressed in leather. It can also be used as an exchange currency.

== Bibliography ==
- Barbara Winston Blackmun, Blades of Beauty and Death: African Art Forged in Metal, 1990
- Werner Fischer, Manfred A. Zirngibl, African Weapons: Knives, Daggers, Swords, Axes, Throwing Knives, 1978
- Jan Elsen, De fer et de fierté, Armes blanches d’Afrique noire du Musée Barbier-Mueller, 5 Continents Editions, Milan, 2003
