= Flyssa =

Type of traditional long knife or sword of the Kabyles

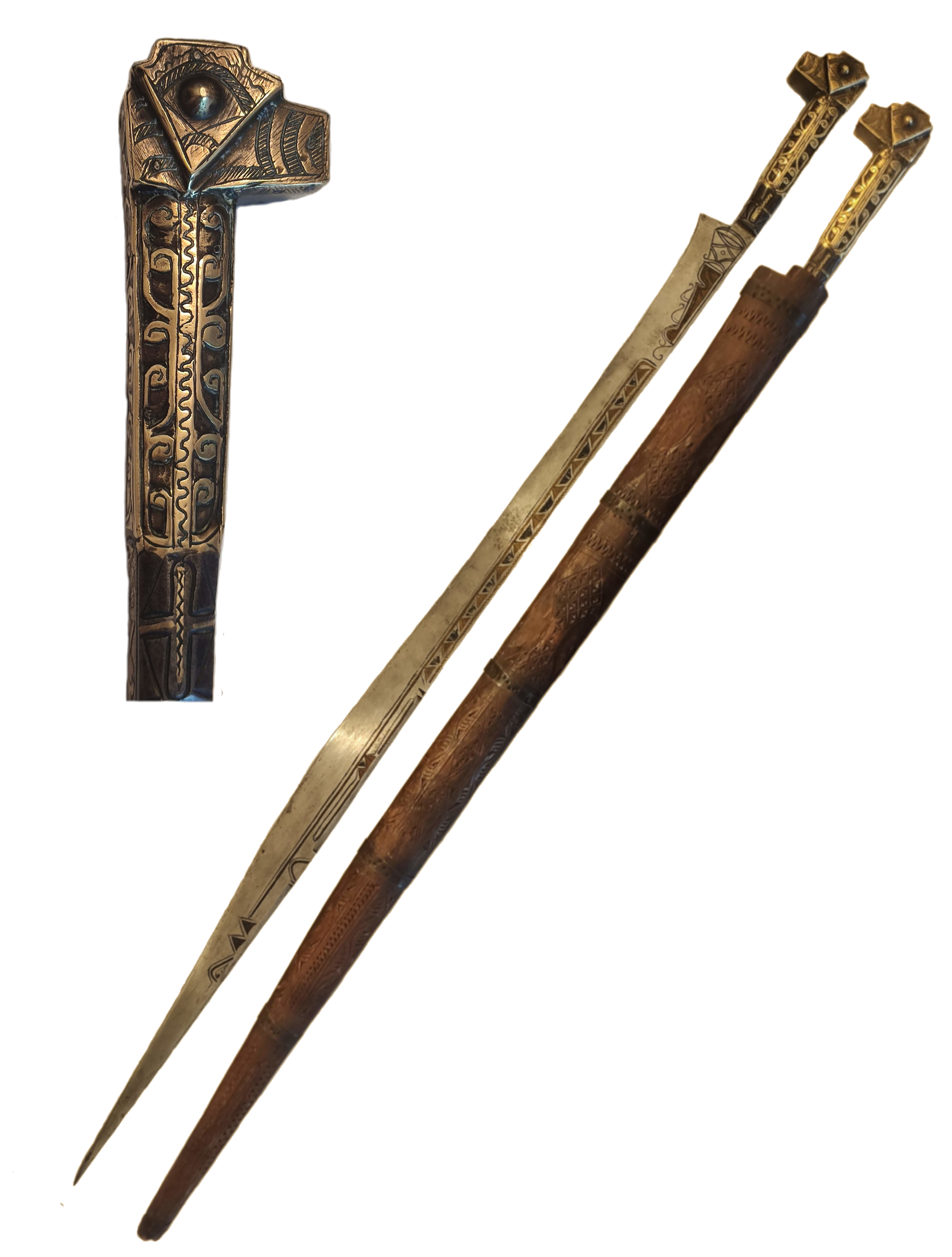
- A sword-sized flyssa, showing the hilt and the widening of the blade around the center of percussion
- Type: Sword, Dagger
- Place of origin: Algeria

Service history
- Used by: Deylik of Algiers; Kingdom of Beni Abbas; Other Algerian tribes
- Wars: Several wars involving Central Maghrebi tribes and nations including: Invasion of Algiers (1775); Invasion of Algiers in 1830; French conquest of Algeria

The flyssa, known locally as ajenoui (Kabyle: ajenoui or uturam), is a traditional edged weapon of Algeria produced and used during the 19th century and earlier. It originates from the Kabyle Iflissen Lebhar tribal confederacy.

== Characteristics ==
These weapons have blades of various sizes from 12 to 38 inches (30 to 97 cm), and can be classed as varying between long knives and full-sized swords. Whatever their size, flyssas are characterized by narrow, straight-backed, single-edged blades, which come to an acute point. The blades of sword-sized flyssas often widen gradually around the center of percussion, which enhances their cutting ability. The blades are often decorated with chiselled patterns, which are sometimes inlaid.

The hilt has no guard and the junction between blade and hilt is made by a metal bolster. The distal part of the hilt is almost always of wood covered with brass, usually decorated with repoussé and chasing, and has a characteristic downturned projection forming the snout of a stylised animal head at the pommel (though the pommel and grip are made in a single piece - the identity of the animal is unknown, with dog, camel and chimaera all being suggested).

== Name ==
The blade's name (Flyssa) was given by the French who derived it from the name of the tribe that it originated from (Iflissen). In pre-colonial times, the sword was called Ajenouii which means “knife” in the Berber Kabyle dialect, also a word derived from the name of the city of Genoa. The term uturam is also used and is said to be derived from the Turkish "yatagan".
