= Ida (sword) =

Sword of the Yoruba people of West Africa

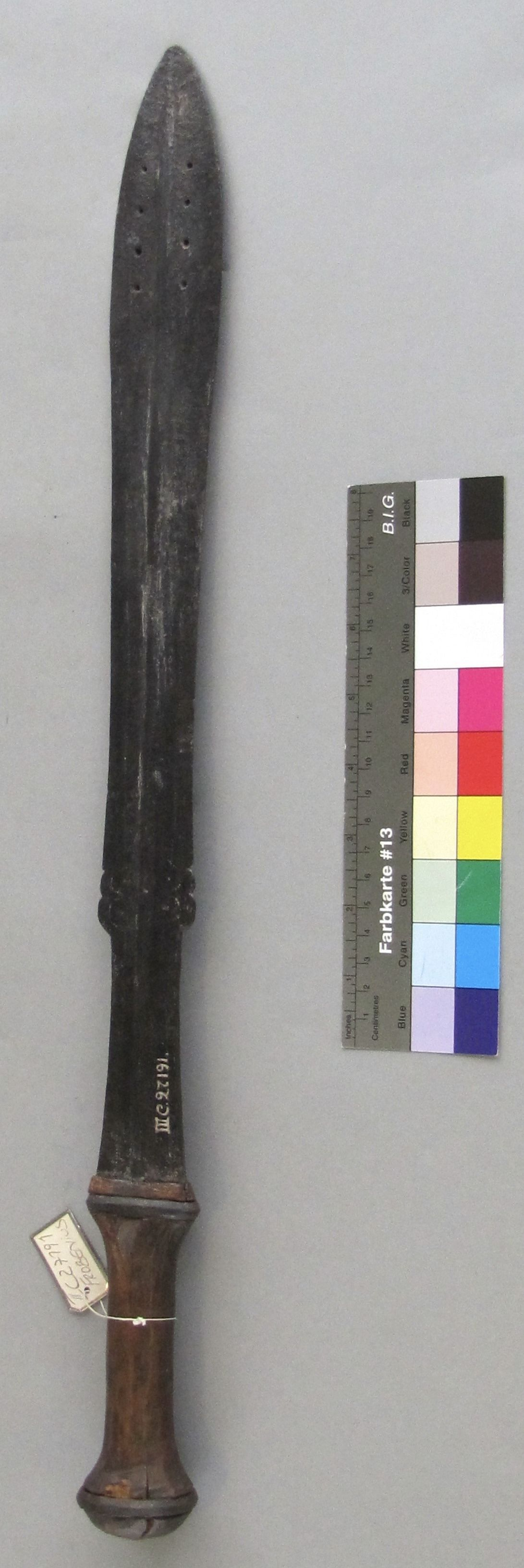
- Early 20th century Iron sword collected by Leo Frobenius, likely an Ida type by design. 56.5 cm.
- Type: Sword
- Place of origin: Nigeria

Service history
- Used by: Oyo Empire; Benin Kingdom

Specifications
- Mass: 2 lb (0.91 kg)
- Length: 18 to 32 in (46 to 81 cm)
- Width: (2 in (5.1 cm) (Max blade)
- Blade type: iron; pointed, double-edged, single-edged
- Hilt type: Wood, Iron

The Ida (also known as Ida gigun meaning 'long sword') is a traditional sword used by the Yoruba people of West Africa. Distantly reminiscent of European late-medieval swords, it served as one of the primary weapons of Yoruba armies before the widespread adoption of firearms, alongside spears and bows and arrows.

== Design ==
The ida typically features a sometimes leaf-shaped iron blade ranging from 18 to 30 inches (46 to 76 cm) in length, with most examples being lighter than European or Islamic Swords, weighing approximately 2 pounds (0.9 kg).

The blade is usually double-edged but can be also be single edged, with various designs including straight, gently tapering, or distinctive outward-curving shapes that reach their maximum width of about 2 inches (5 cm) near the point. Some variants maintain uniform width throughout and end in a curved, spade-like tip. The ricasso of the swords usually being less wide than the rest of the blade. The blades were typically locally manufactured and often decorated with geometrical designs or patterns of small holes. Hilts were traditionally made of wood, though some exceptional examples, such as one preserved at Ikoyi, feature iron hilts complete with pommel and cross-guard. The swords were designed for single-handed use and were employed in both mounted and dismounted combat, though they proved more effective in infantry warfare.

Usage of the ida extended beyond warfare to hunting and ceremonial purposes. Many examples of these swords are still preserved by Yoruba obas (kings) and chiefs as symbols of authority and cultural heritage. A notable variant is the single-edged backsword version of the ida, which features a narrow blade. Some surviving examples show sophisticated local craftsmanship, with decorative elements reflecting the artistic traditions of regions such as Abeokuta and Ijebu-Ode, while showing distant similarities from 16th-century European and Near Eastern sword designs.

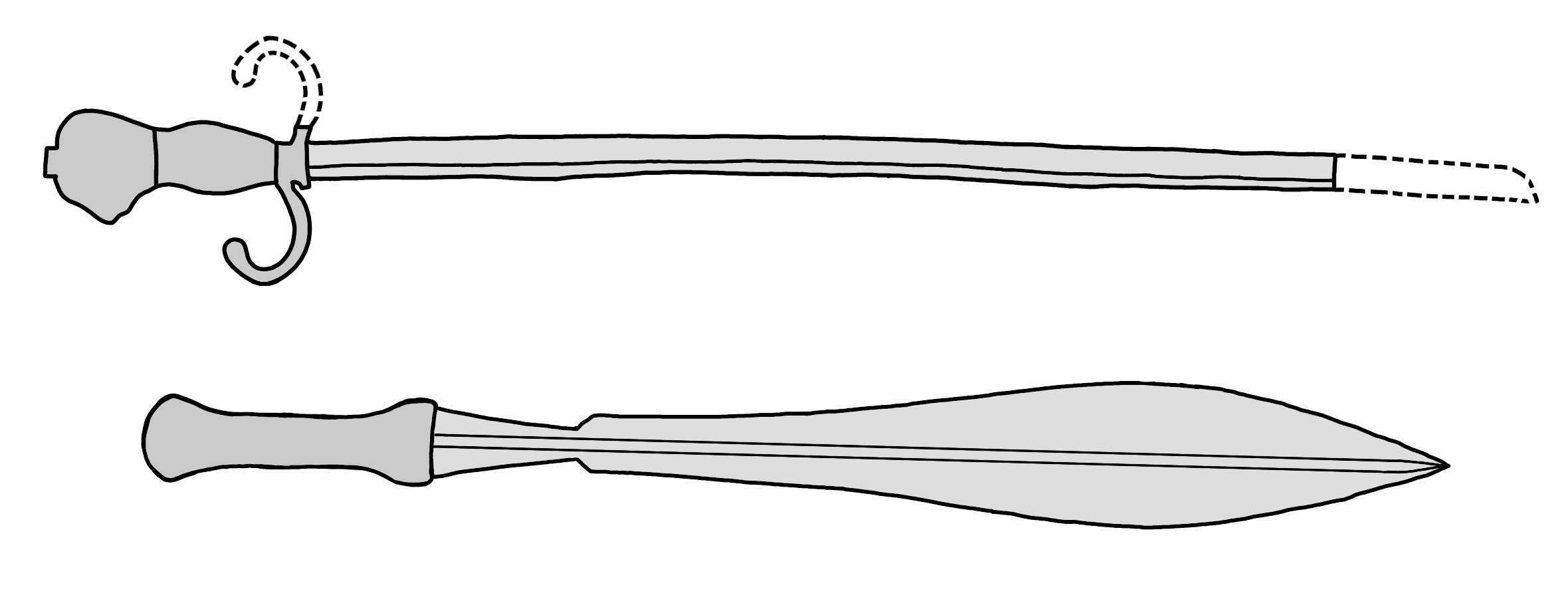
Ida variations. On top is the straight single-edged and narrow-bladed backsword Ida. And the bottom is the double-edged leaf shaped Ida.

== Production ==
The Yoruba blacksmiths were among the most skilled in West Africa. They employed various techniques in crafting Ida swords. Most of the metal weapons used by the Yoruba were produced by their own metalworkers, including the mining and smelting of iron ore before 800 A.D. They were also capable of producing steel by the late Iron Age, well before the colonial period. From the seventeenth century onward, copper and iron rods were imported by sea from Europe. However, the production of iron from local ore continued until the early twentieth century. This style of sword was also often used by neighboring groups, such as the Edo people, and is depicted in numerous Benin plaques.

== Variations ==
There were many other variations of the Idà. The Yoruba also used many other bladed-weapons.

Some of them were;

- Àdá — Single edged, used for clearing brush, fighting, or hunting. It is similar to a cutlass or machete. Rock carvings in Ife show that this sword has been used in Yorubaland since at least the 14th century.
- Ọ̀bẹ — Daggers carried by the Yoruba soldiers.
- Agẹ̀dẹ̀ngbẹ — single-edged iron blade, eccentrically curved. Also quite heavy. Length varies from 20 to 24 in (50 to 61 cm). The hilt is usually wood wraped with leather.
- Tanmogayi — Similar to the sabre. This may just be an alternative name to the thin single-edged Ida.

== See also ==
- Yoruba people
- Types of swords
- Sword
