= San mai =

Blademaking technique

San mai (Japanese: 三枚, Hepburn: sanmai), in the context of metal blade construction or metalwork, refers to a knife, blade or sword that has the hard steel hagane forming the blade's edge, and the iron/stainless forming a jacket on both sides. It is also the term used to refer to the technique used to create these blades.

== Origin, use of the term, and history ==
The term, and its root honsanmai (本三枚), has been used to describe that construction method for many hundreds of years, from around 1300 A.D. It refers to when three layers of steel are used. The center is hard, and the sides are typically softer. As san mai is a generic term for a technique, the term can't be trademarked. Outside in the specific context of blade construction technique, the term, in general use in Japan, refers to three flat things (e.g. three tickets, or three pieces of paper), with mai 枚, being the counter unit term for flat objects in Japanese.

This technique of jacketed lamination (sandwiching a harder steel core between softer steel sheets) was a forging technique that dates back at least 2000 years to the kingdoms and empires of ancient China. The swords of the medieval Chinese Tang dynasty (many of which are preserved in Japanese museums) are made with this lamination technique of a harder steel core wrapped in a softer steel jacket. Jacketed lamination techniques, as well as repeated hammering and folding techniques, date to at least the ancient Chinese Han dynasty of 202 BC to 220 AD. Modern metallurgical and structural analysis of Han dynasty swords revealed that some swords had a layered structure, while others had a laminated structure. The more layered swords had more than 30 layers, while other swords had 10 layers.

"From the end of the Eastern Han to the Three Kingdoms period, the bailian gang (“100-fold refined” steel) technique was developed based on the chaogang technique. This technique involved repeated hot forging, folding, and stacking of chaogang bars in order to refine the crystals and inclusions. Steel with relatively low carbon content could sometimes be used as an ingredient to form composite steel. The number of laminations indicates the counts of lian (refining). The higher counts of lian, the higher number of forging cycles in the steel processing."

== Technique ==
In stainless versions, this technique offers a practical and visible advantage of a superb cutting edge of modern Japanese knife steel, with a corrosion-resistant exterior. In professional Japanese kitchens, the edge is kept free of corrosion and knives are generally sharpened on a daily basis. Corrosion can be avoided by keeping the exposed portion of the non-stainless portion of the blade clean and dry after each use.

Technically, it is a style of lamination used for blade construction, commonly used on blades that have a symmetrical grind (i.e. the edges are ground down from both sides to expose the edge, which is composed of the inner core material. In Japan, traditionally the steel used for the outer layer is Gukunan-tetsu

The technique has been used outside Japan in modern knife making in the United States, often with new types of materials, including D2 tool steel and carbon fiber.
