= Francisca =

Frankish throwing axe

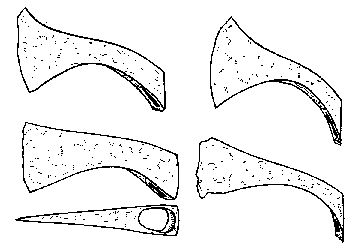
Different types of francisca heads

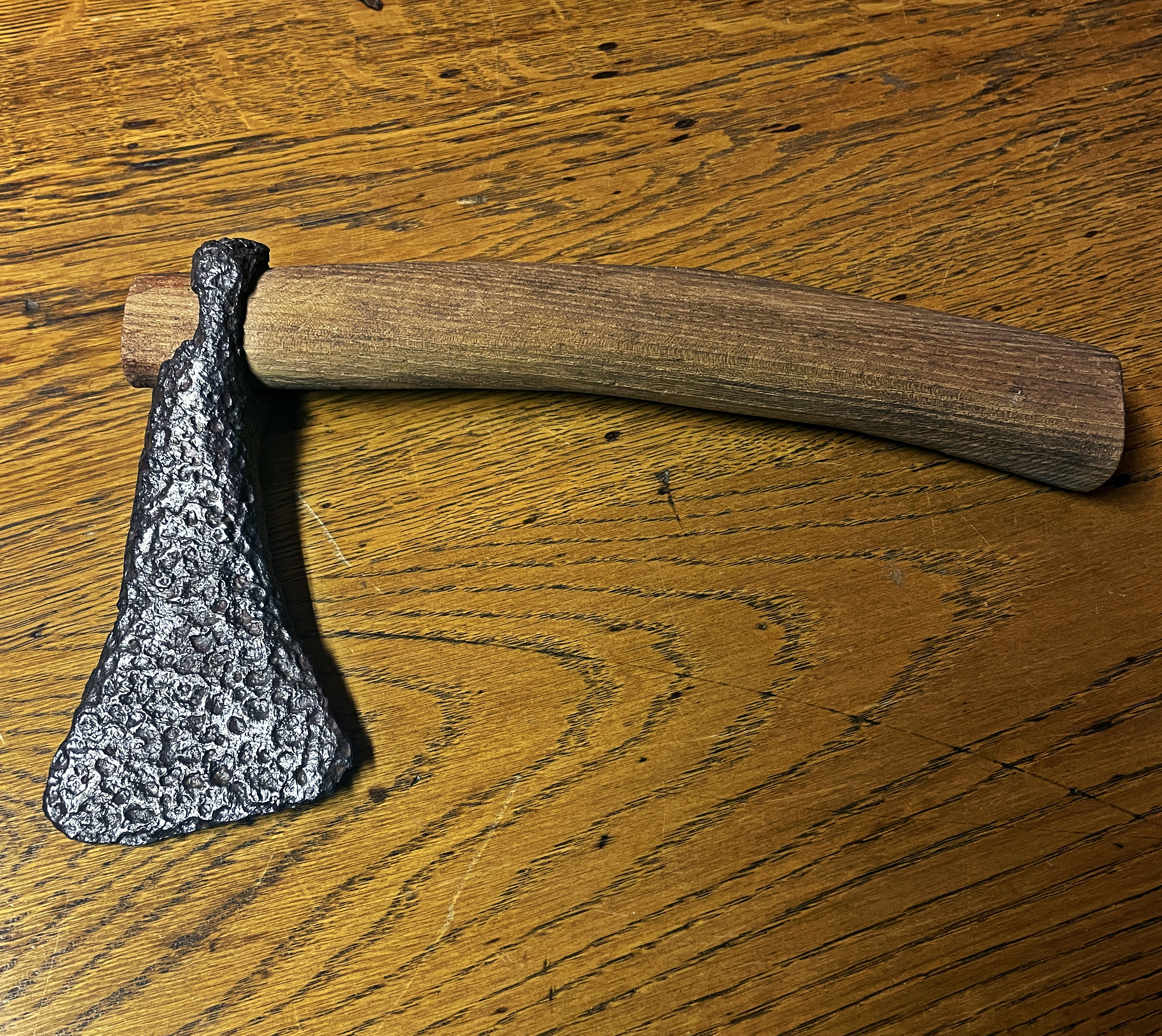
Francisca with shaft

The francisca (or francesca) was a throwing axe used as a weapon during the Early Middle Ages by the Franks, among whom it was a characteristic national weapon at the time of the Merovingians (about 500 to 750 AD). It is known to have been used during the reign of Charlemagne (768–814). Although generally associated with the Franks, it was also used by other Germanic peoples of the period, including the Anglo-Saxons; several examples have been found in England.

== Etymology ==
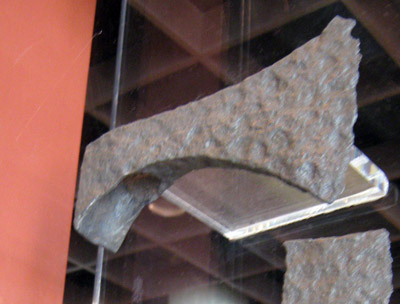
Francisca on display in Romano-Germanic Museum in Cologne, Germany

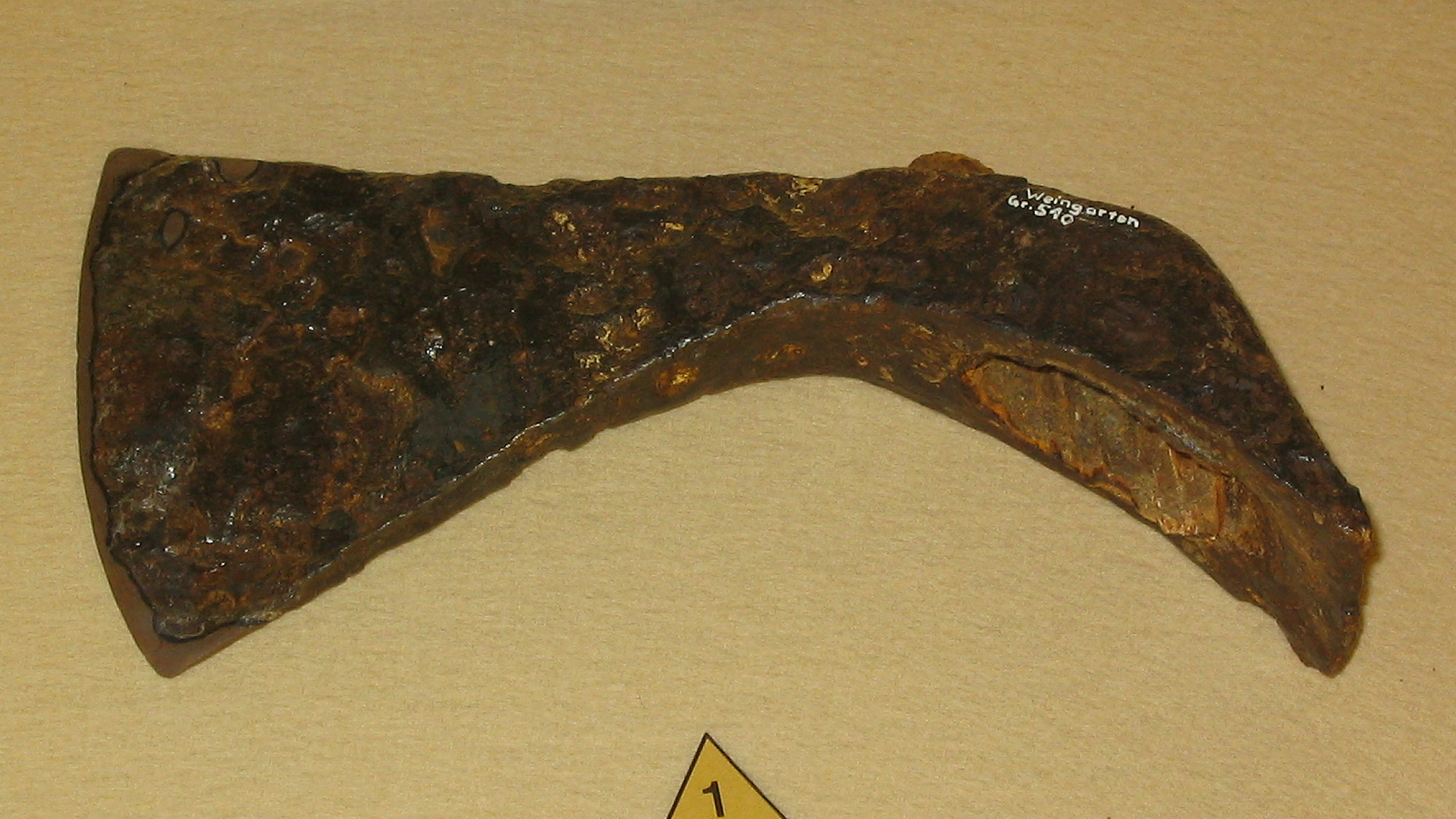
Blade of a Francisca from the Alamannic graveyard of Weingarten (6th century)

The term francisca first appeared in the book Etymologiarum sive originum, libri XVIII by Isidore of Seville (c. 560–636) as a name used in Hispania to refer to these weapons "because of their use by the Franks".

The historian Gregory of Tours (c. 538–594) in his History of the Franks uses two Latin terms for the Frankish axe: securis and bipennis.

The régime of Vichy France used the image of a stylised double-headed francisque as part of its iconography (compare fasces).

== Description ==
The francisca is characterized by its distinctly arch-shaped head, widening toward the cutting edge and terminating in a prominent point at both the upper and lower corners. The top of the head is usually either S-shaped or convex with the lower portion curving inward and forming an elbow with the short wooden haft. Sometimes the head is more upswept, forming a wider angle with the haft. Most franciscas have a round or teardrop-shaped eye designed to fit the tapered haft, similar to Viking axes. Based on the measurements of modern replicas, the francisca had a haft length of around 40–45 cm (16–18 in) and a 10 cm (3.9 in) cutting edge with an average weight of around 600 g (21 oz; 1.3 lb). Based on the surviving heads of franciscas recovered at Burgh Castle and Morning Thorpe in county Norfolk, England, the length of the head itself measured 14–15 cm (5.5–5.9 in) from the edge to the back of the socket.

== Use ==
The Byzantine historian Procopius (c. 500–565) described the Franks and their use of throwing axes:

...each man carried a sword and shield and an axe. Now the iron head of this weapon was thick and exceedingly sharp on both sides while the wooden handle was very short. And they are accustomed always to throw these axes at one signal in the first charge and thus shatter the shields of the enemy and kill the men.

Procopius makes it clear that the Franks threw their axes immediately before hand-to-hand combat with the purpose of breaking shields and disrupting the enemy line while possibly wounding or killing an enemy warrior. The weight of the head and length of the haft would allow the axe to be thrown with considerable momentum to an effective range of about 12 m (39 ft). Even if the edge of the blade were not to strike the target, the weight of the iron head could cause injury. The francisca also had a psychological effect in that, on the throwing of the francisca, the enemy might turn and run in the fear that another volley was coming.

Some sources, strangely, describe the francisca as both the "main weapons" of the Frankish infantry around the time of Clovis and also describe the francisca as being a fierce melee weapon.

== See also ==
- Anglo-Saxon warfare
- Axe
- Battle axe
- Hurlbat
- Nzappa zap
- Tomahawk
