= Nzappa zap =

Traditional weapon from the Congo

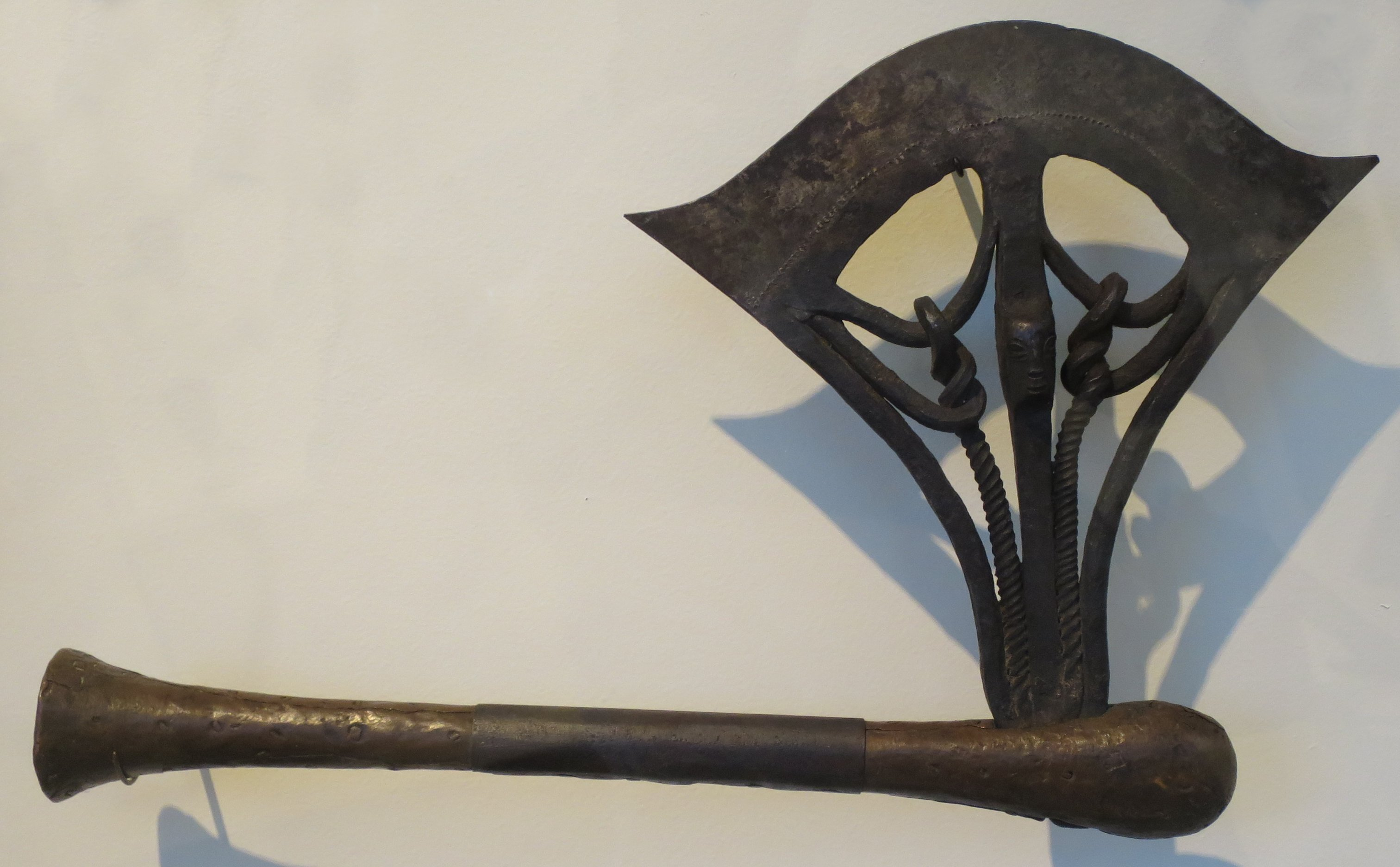
Ceremonial axe of the Songye people

The Nzappa zap (also referred to as zappozap, nsapo, kilonda, kasuyu) is a traditional weapon from the Congo similar to an axe or hatchet.

== Uses ==
It has an ornate wrought-iron blade connected to a club-like wooden handle, often clad in copper, bronze or brass.

Largely ceremonial, it can be used much like the American tomahawk, both thrown for short distances and wielded as a weapon in hand-to-hand combat. It differs from the usual axe style, in that the blade mounts to looping prongs that affix to the shaft.

This weapon is from the upper Congo region and was used in battle. It was usually crafted by the Nsapo people who thrived industrially from iron and copper. The blade is forged from iron and the handle is made of wood covered in copper. The Nzappa Zap has a club like handle that flares at the base and has a rounded head. The blade is also attached through a post extending from the handle. Nzappa Zaps sometimes has two or three human faces in the iron head. The axe is ceremonial and usually kept and carried by the chiefs of the Songye. The weapon holds power and significance among the people. The axe was used in battle, as a status symbol, and also as a form of currency in trade.

The weapon is the etymological base of the name "Zappo Zap", an infamous Songye tribal group once active in the Congo Free State.

== Gallery ==
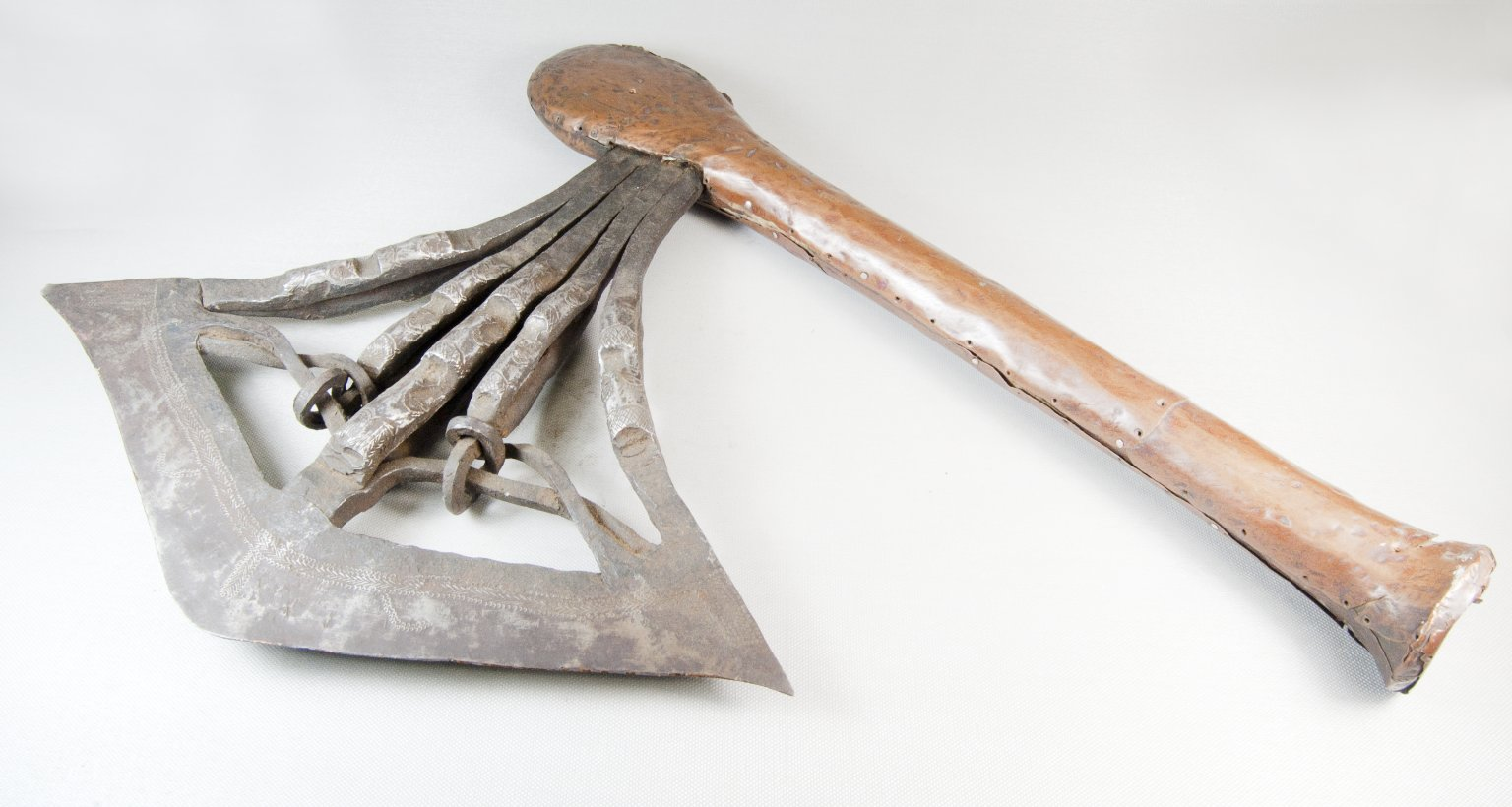
Nzappa zap, Brooklyn Museum

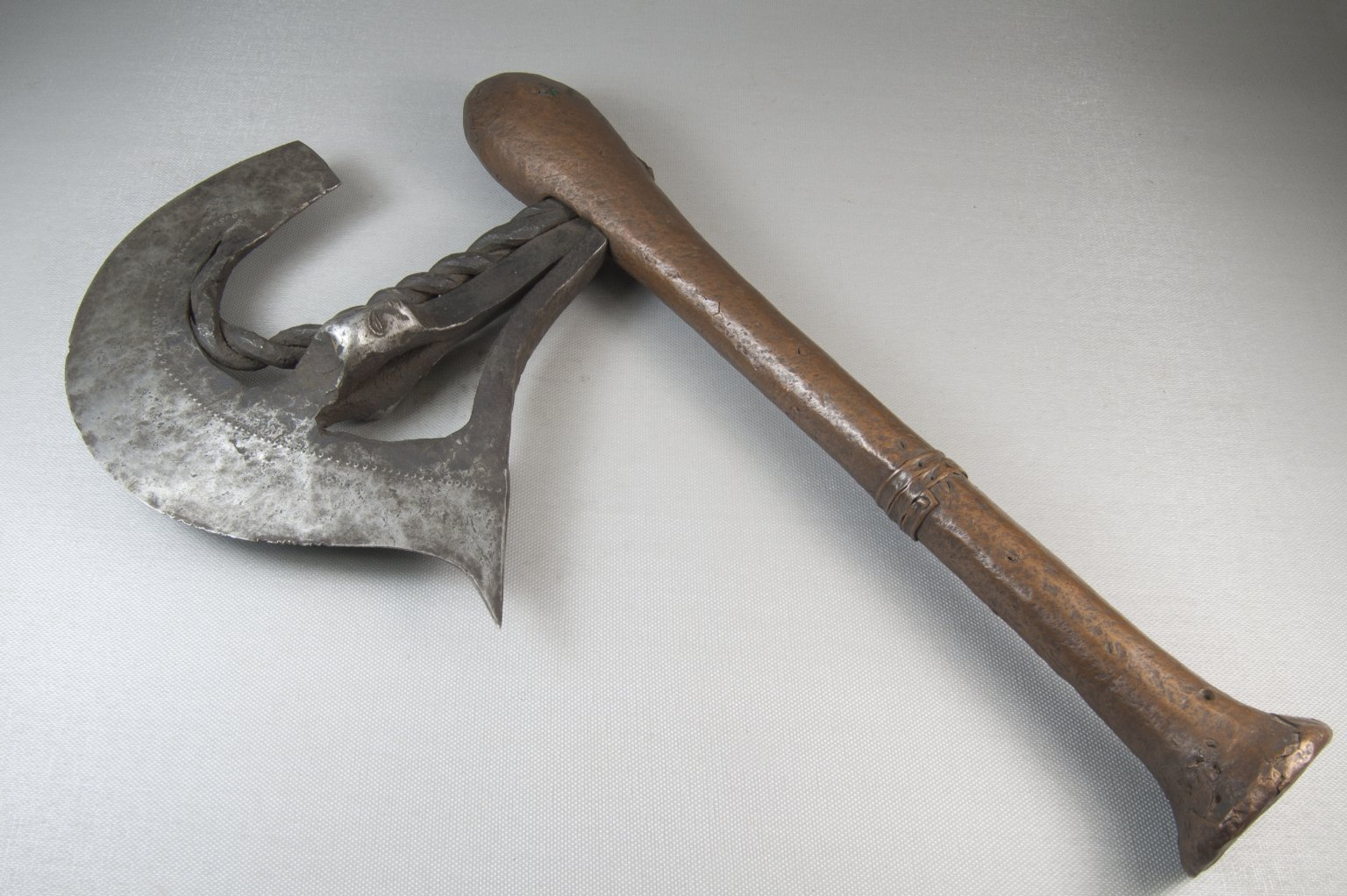
Nzappa zap or Kilonda

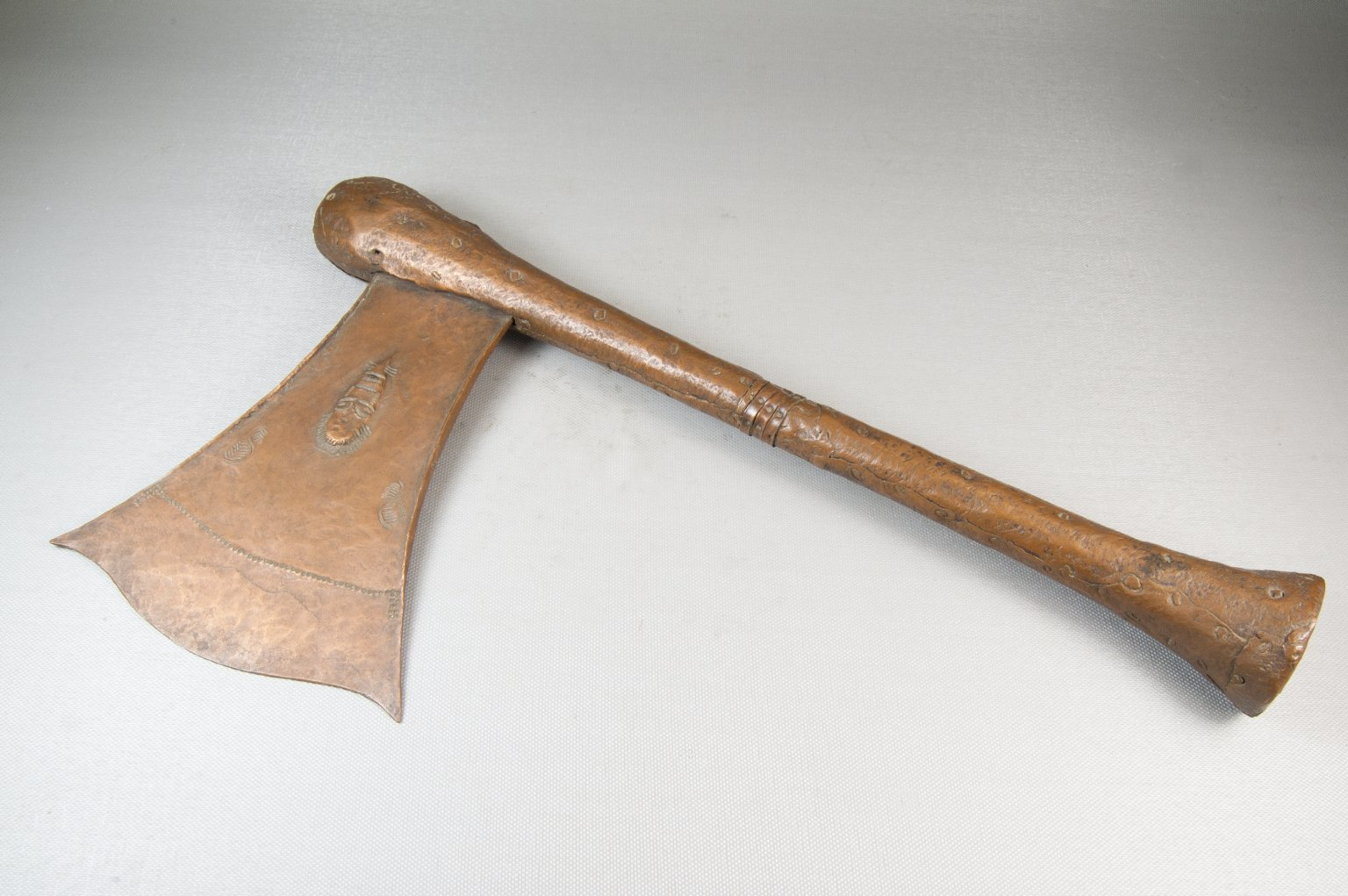
Nzappa zap or Kilonda with full blade

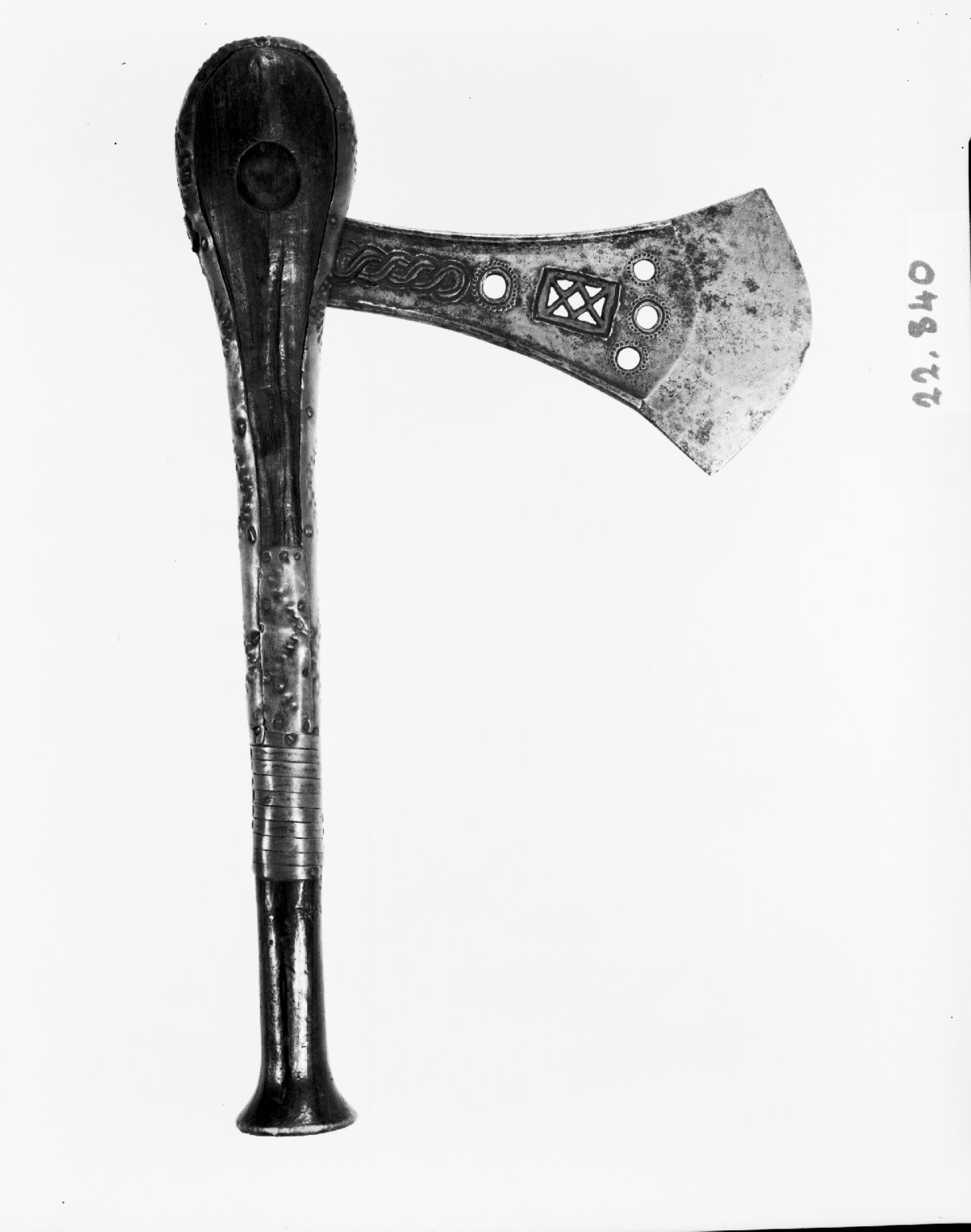
Nsapo axe

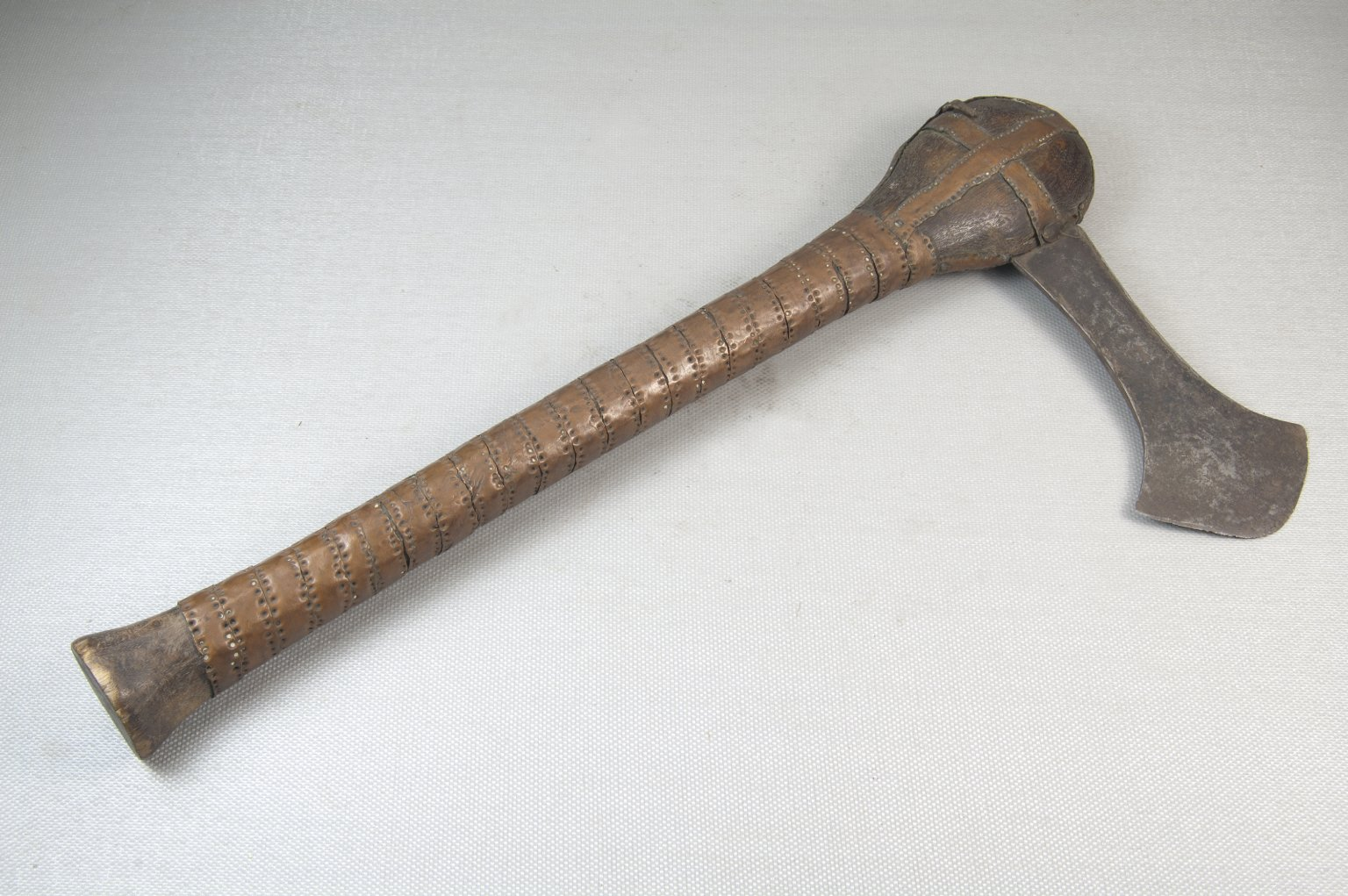
Nsapo with thin blade

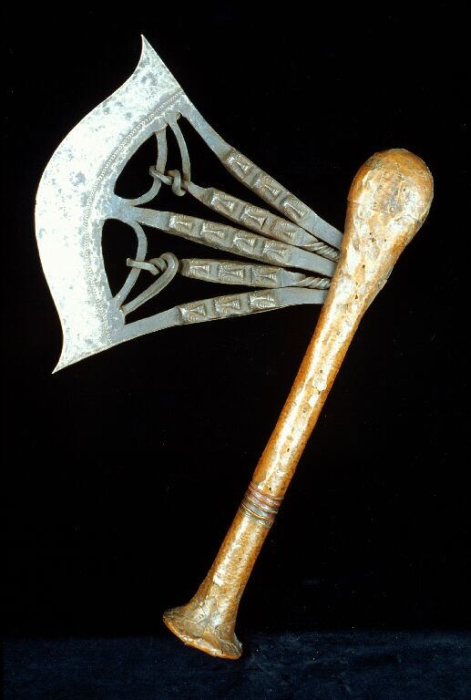
Ceremonial axe

== See also ==
- Throwing axe
- Hunga Munga
- Hurlbat
