= Mbanja =

A mbanja is a knife, and a cold weapon. Its blade is typically made of iron, and hilt made of leather, and is frequently decorated with patterns. The mbanja is a unique melee weapon, and is also a throwing weapon. As such, it closely resembles a tomahawk.

The mbanja was utilized during the late 19th century and the early 20th century. However, looking at its handle reveals that it most likely wasn't used seriously.
