= Aklys =

Roman javelin

The aklys (Latin aclys, Greek ἀγκυλίς) was a Roman javelin measuring approximately 2 m (79 in, 6.6 ft) in length, thrown with the aid of a leather strap or amentum, similar to a Swiss arrow. Every soldier was issued at least two. The term also applies to a small mace or club equipped with spikes, attached to one arm of the wielder by a strap of adjustable length to enable the weapon to be retrieved after it had been hurled at an enemy. Its use probably goes back to the Osci tribe of southern Italy.

The weapon is also described as a dart and as a throwing stick or boomerang.

== Popular culture ==
The aklys, as a "thonged club", appears in various fantasy games such as Dungeons & Dragons. The aklys appears in a supplement, Unearthed Arcana, as well as Dragon Magazine Vol. 7, No. 2 (August 1982). It was described as "a weighted, shortish club with a stout thong attached to the butt. While it can be used as a hand-held striking weapon, its principal employment is as a missile. Once hurled, the aklys can be retrieved by its thong."

== See also ==
- Cateia
- Hurlbat
- Javelin throw
- Military of ancient Rome
- Morning star
- Roman army
- Roman military personal equipment
- Spear
- Spear thrower
