= Cateia =

Ancient European throwing club

A cateia is an ancient European throwing weapon. Sources describe it similar to a boomerang and possibly related to the aklys.

== Etymology ==
The name cateia comes probably from Italian and Celtic words related to the adjective "curved", probably in reference to its shape. The word resembles katari, another word for the Indian throwing club called valari, as well as kotaha, a Maori sling-powered javelin-thrower, although the latter case is almost certainly a coincidence more than a common etymology.

== Characteristics ==
According to Servius, the cateia is similar to the aklys, but twice its length, made of flexible wood with metal spikes and fitted with a rope to throw it, although he identifies it as a kind of spear (hasta). Writing two centuries later, Isidore of Seville described it as a heavy throwing club, which flew not very far but with great force of impact, and which returned to the user's hands if he was skilled enough. Other chroniclers state it was curved in shape and spinning in its way of flying.

Some authors consider the cateia a javelin fitted with a rope to work as an amentum, a throwing axe, or an entire genre of throwing weapons. It is also possible the word was used for more than one weapon, so it could refer to a boomerang-like weapon in some of the references.

== History ==
Virgil mentions cateias in Aeneid, telling of its usage by the tribes subservient to King Turnus of the Rutuli, who supposedly employed the weapon in the Teuton style. Silius Italicus tells the Libyans in Hannibal's army wielded cateias. and Valerius Flaccus tells the same about the peoples inhabiting east to the Black Sea. Strabo might refer to the cateia when he writes of a wooden weapon, similar to a spear tip, which the Belgae used to hunt birds, throwing it by hand farther than an arrow. Isidore tells the weapon was known by the Gauls and Hispanics of his time (6th century), who in turn claimed it had a Teuton origin.

Boomerang-like throwing clubs were found in archaeological sites in Magdeburg and Velsen, traceable to 800-400 and 300 BC respectively, possibly examples of cateias. After making replicas and testing them in the hands of experts, it was confirmed they had returning capacity. A later weapon was found in Normandy, possibly built in 120-80 BC, although the design of this one didn't demonstrate the same capacity.

== See also ==
- Aklys
- Boomerang
- Throwing stick
- Hurlbat
