= VTAC =

VTAC may mean:

- Victorian Tertiary Admissions Centre
- Vietnam Tactical Tomahawk
- VTAC, vertical design of a packaged terminal air conditioner (PTAC).

== See also ==
- Ventricular tachycardia, or V-tach, an irregular beating of the heart
- Two-stroke power valve system#Honda V-TACS, a foot-operated power valve system made by Honda
- VTEC, a variable valve timing system used in Honda engines
