= Maximum time aloft =

Maximum Time Aloft (MTA) is a type of boomerang competition involving specially engineered boomerangs. They are launched high, and enter a stable hover. In the official USBA competition throwers get five throws, and the times of the best three attempts are scored. Normally, the catch must be made for the time to be counted. Internationally, the highest time from the five throws is the accepted means of scoring.

Currently the maximum time aloft for a boomerang throw that was successfully caught is 3 minutes and 49 seconds.

The MTA100 record that is more commonly competed (i.e. the throw and catch must be within the same 100 metre diameter circle) is 1 minute and 44.87 seconds, by Eric Darnell in Portland, USA, on 21 September 1997.

== Boomerang associations ==
- International Federation of Boomerang Associations
- Boomerang Association of Australia
- British Boomerang Society
- Canadian Boomerang Throwers Association
- United States Boomerang Association
