= American Tomahawk Company =

Company that manufactures Tomahawks for the US

- Company type: Private
- Industry: Manufacturing
- Founded: Ebensburg, Pennsylvania; 1966; 60 years ago
- Headquarters: Chattanooga, Tennessee
- Products: Tomahawks
- Number of employees: 100
- Website: www.americantomahawk.com

American Tomahawk Company is a US-based company which manufactures modern tomahawks for use by the US Military. It was founded in 1966 by Peter LaGana to make tomahawks for the Vietnam War and folded in the 1970s. ATC was revived in March 2019 by RMJ Tactical to produce tomahawks for a wide range of outdoor uses and to continue on the great military history. The famous VTAC has been revised, updated and re-introduced as the Model 1 Tomahawk.

== History ==
The company was founded in 1966 by Peter LaGana with the original Vietnam Tomahawk design. This original model featured a wood handle, an axe head with reverse spike, and a leather sheath. LaGana manufactured 4,000 Tomahawks for soldiers and marines for use in the jungles of Southeast Asia.

In November 2000, professional knife and tomahawk throwers Andy Prisco and Bobby Branton approached LaGana, and got his approval to license his design and restart the defunct firm in January 2001. The company resumed production of the original design: the "Vietnam Tomahawk", replacing the original wood handle with a synthetic one. In 2005 ATC introduced the CQC-T (Close Quarters Combat Tomahawk): a collaboration with Custom Knife-maker Ernest Emerson of Emerson Knives. In 2008 a collaboration with Custom Knife-maker Shane Sibert resulted in a modern version of the Lewis and Clark spontoon tomahawk known as the "Comanche"; this tomahawk is also produced under license by Fox knives of Italy. In 2019 RMJ Tactical purchased American Tomahawk Company.

=== Military use ===
The company’s "VTAC" ("Vietnam Tactical Tomahawk") is in use by the US Army Stryker Brigade in Afghanistan, the 172nd SBCT Team based at Grafenwoehr, GE, the 3rd Brigade, 2nd Infantry Division out of Fort Lewis, a Recon Platoon in the 2-183d CAV (116th IBCT)(OIF 2007-2008) and numerous other soldiers. The VTAC was issued NATO Stock Number 4210-01-518-7244 and classified as a “Class 9 rescue kit” as a result of a program called the Rapid Fielding Initiative; it is also included within every Stryker vehicle as the “Modular Entry Tool set”.
