= Boomerang =

Thrown tool and weapon

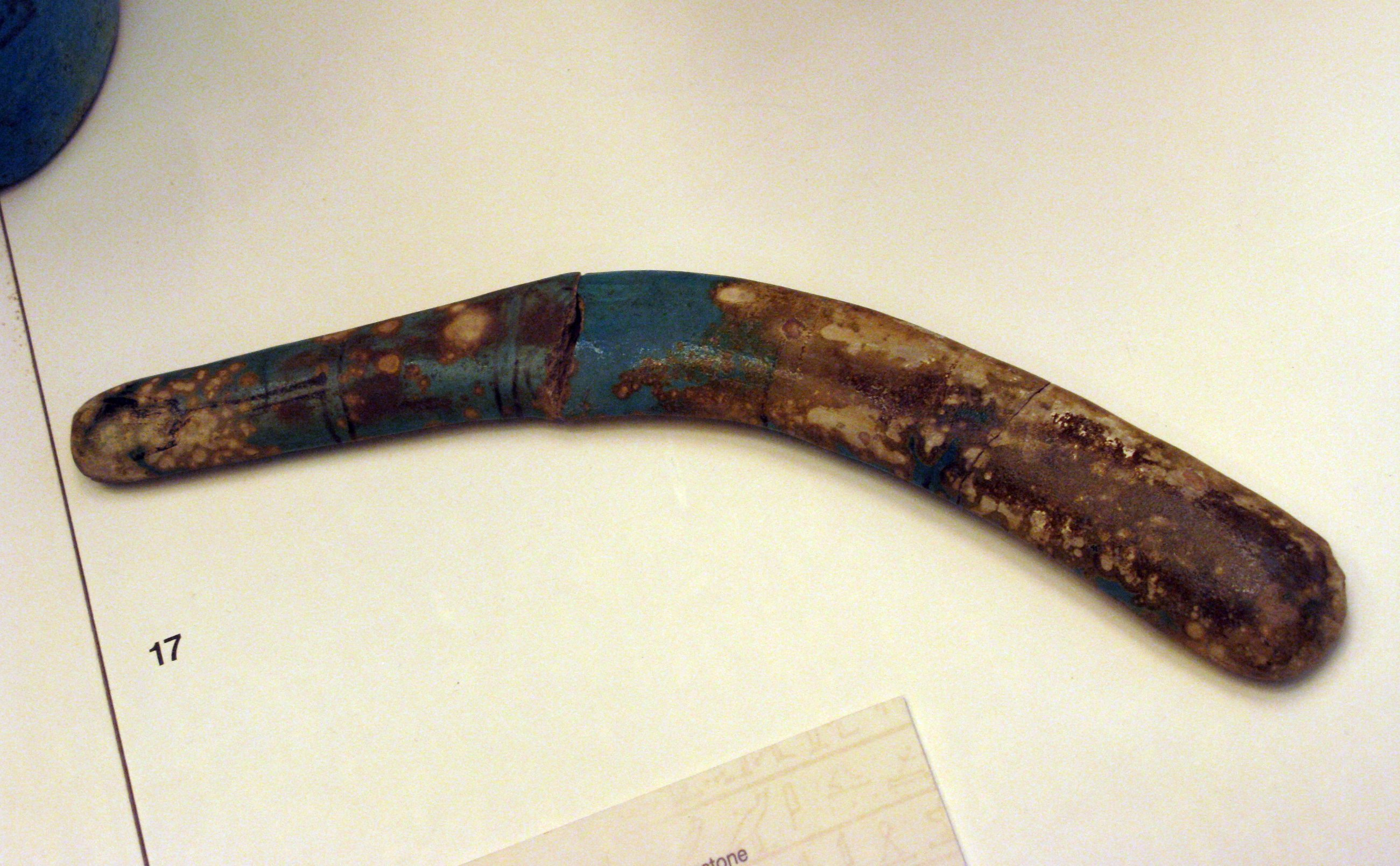
An Egyptian boomerang; National Archaeological Museum, Athens, Greece.

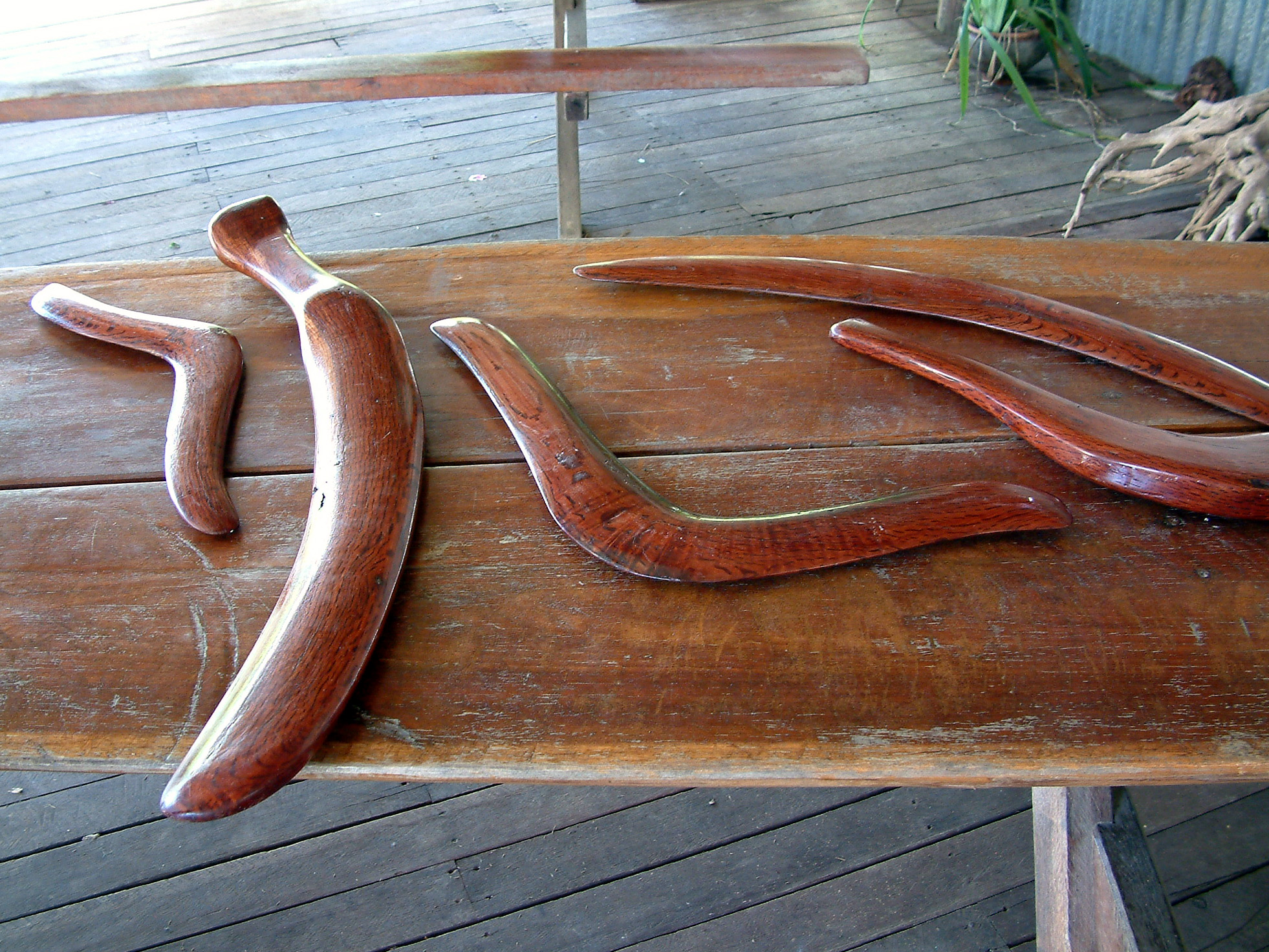
Australian Aboriginal boomerangs

A boomerang (/ˈbuːməræŋ/) is a thrown tool typically constructed with airfoil sections and designed to spin about an axis perpendicular to the direction of its flight, designed to return to the thrower. The origin of the word is from an Aboriginal Australian language of the Sydney region. Its original meaning, which is preserved in official competitions, refers only to returning objects, not to throwing sticks, which were also used for hunting by various peoples both in Australia and around the world. However, the term "non-returning boomerang" is also in general use.

Various forms of boomerang-like designs were traditionally and in some cases are still used by some groups of Aboriginal Australians for hunting. The tools were known by various names in the many Aboriginal languages prior to colonisation. The oldest surviving Aboriginal boomerang, now held in the South Australian Museum, was found in a peat bog in South Australia, dated to 10,000 BC. Historically, boomerangs have been used for hunting, sport, and entertainment, and are made in various shapes and sizes to suit different purposes. Ancient "boomerangs", used for hunting, have also been discovered in Egypt, the Americas, and Europe, although it is unclear whether all or any of these were of the returning type.

== History ==
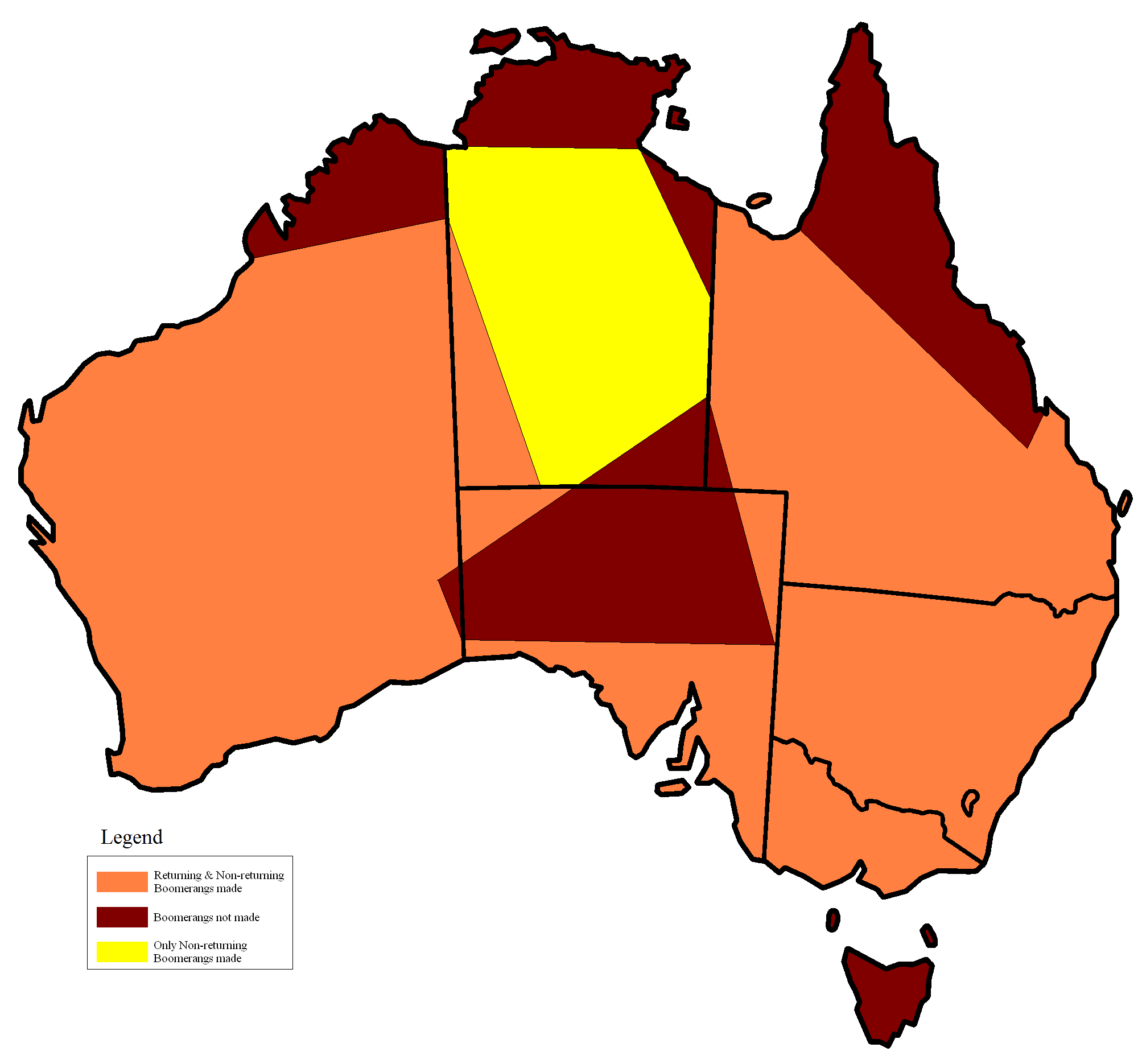
Types of boomerangs in Australia before European contact

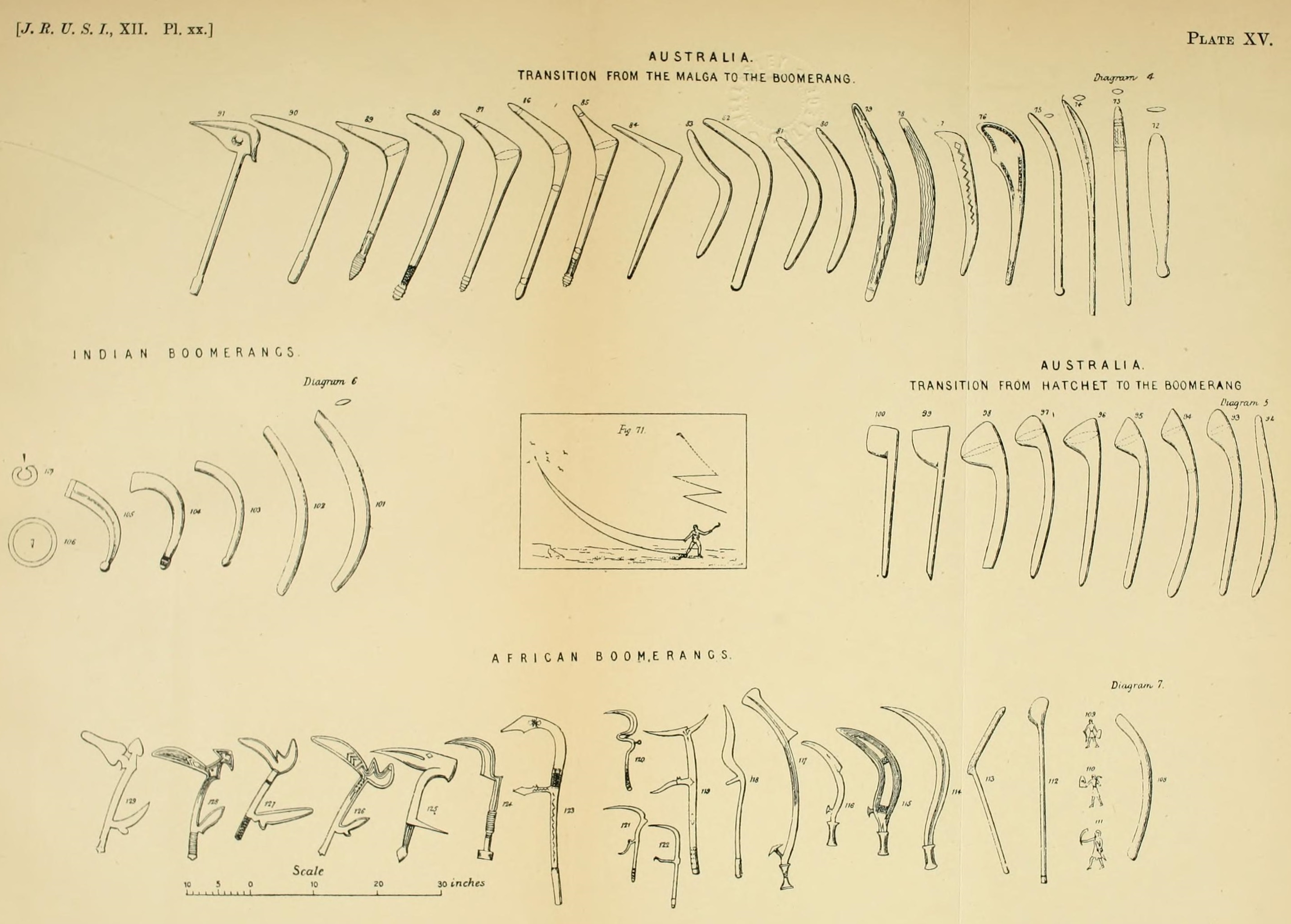
Various types of boomerangs from Australia, India, and Africa

Boomerangs were, historically, used as hunting weapons, percussive musical instruments, battle clubs, fire-starters, decoys for hunting waterfowl, and as recreational play toys. The smallest boomerang may be less than 10 cm (3.9 in) from tip to tip, and the largest over 180 cm (71 in) in length.

Depictions of boomerangs being thrown at animals, such as kangaroos, appear in some of the oldest rock art in the world, the Indigenous Australian rock art of the Kimberley region, which is potentially up to 50,000 years old. According to reports the oldest European surviving boomerang, which was found in a cave in Poland in 1985, dates back about 40,000 years old. The oldest surviving Australian Aboriginal boomerang was found in a peat bog in the Wyrie Swamp of South Australia in 1973. It was dated to 10,000 BC and is held by the South Australian Museum in Adelaide. According to Tony Butz, former history teacher, linguist, and founder of the Boomerang Throwing Association of New South Wales, "the returning boomerang was unknown to Aboriginal peoples in most of the Northern Territory, all of Tasmania, half of South Australia and the northern parts of Queensland and Western Australia. Roughly 60% of Aboriginal peoples used both returning boomerangs and non-returning hunting sticks, and therefore had words for them; a further 10% had only non-returning hunting sticks, and the remaining 30% used neither". Stencils and paintings of boomerangs appear in the rock art of West Papua, including on Bird's Head Peninsula and Kaimana, likely dating to the Last Glacial Maximum (24,000–16,000 BCE), when lower sea levels led to cultural continuity between Papua and Arnhem Land in Northern Australia.

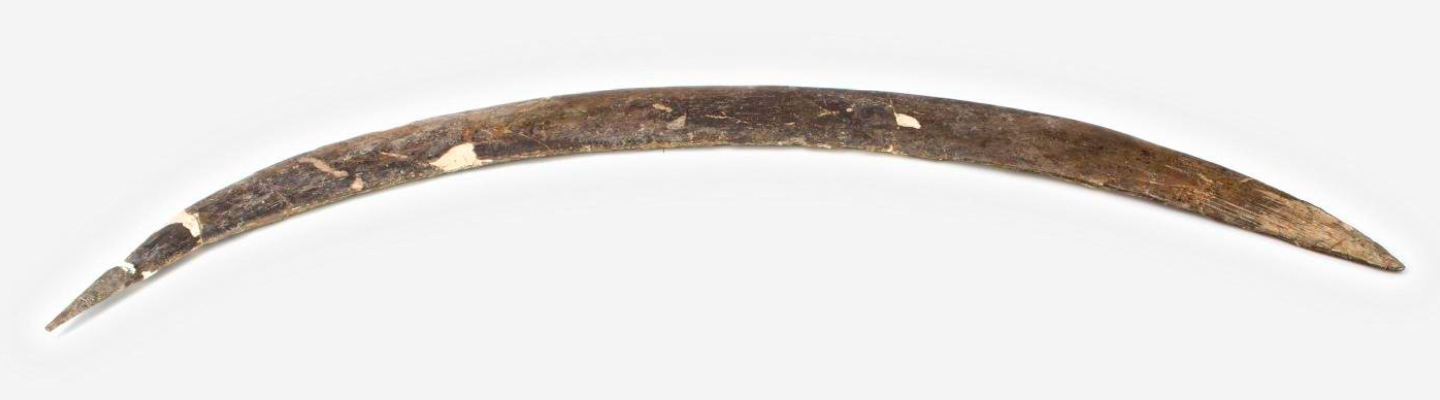
A boomerang made from a mammoth tusk found in the Obłazowa Cave

Although traditionally thought of as Australian, similar weapons have been found also in ancient Europe, Egypt, and North America. There is evidence of the use of non-returning weapons similar to boomerangs by the ancient Egyptians, the Native Americans of California and Arizona, and inhabitants of South India for killing birds and rabbits. An 1883 study reported Ancient Egyptian examples and African examples, but these were non-returning tools. Hunting sticks discovered in Europe seem to have formed part of the Stone Age arsenal of weapons. A boomerang-like weapon discovered in Obłazowa Cave in the Carpathian Mountains in Poland and reported in 1987 was made of mammoth's tusk. It is believed, based on AMS dating of objects found with it, to be about 40,000 years old, the earliest certain find of this type of weapon in the world. In the Netherlands, boomerangs (cateia) have been found in Vlaardingen and Velsen from the first century BC. King Tutankhamun owned a collection of boomerangs.

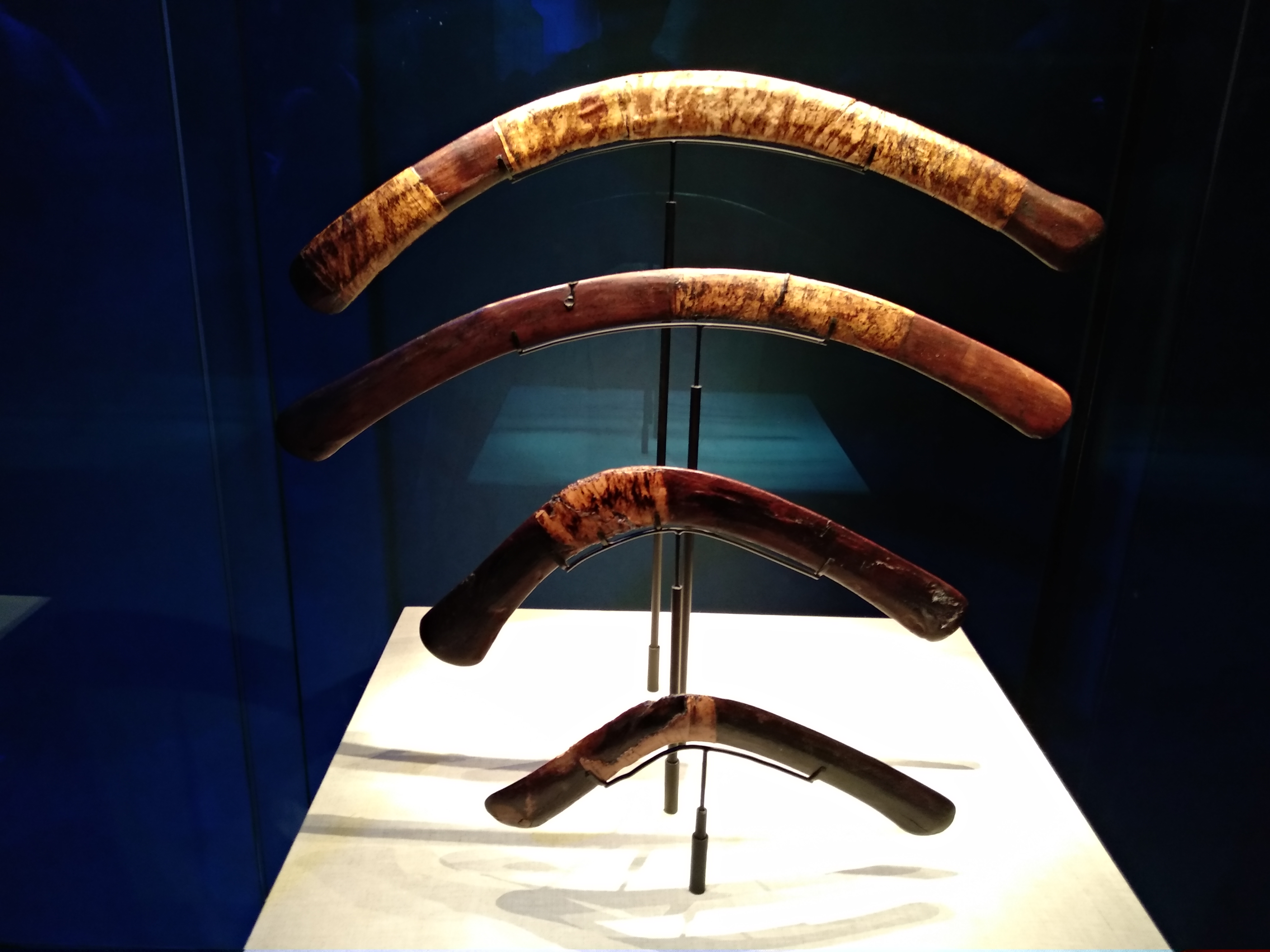
4 boomerangs from the tomb of Pharaoh Tutankhamun (1336–1326 BC)

No one knows for sure how the returning boomerang was invented, but some modern boomerang makers speculate that it developed from the flattened throwing stick, still used by Aboriginal Australians and other indigenous peoples around the world, including the Navajo in North America. The curving flight characteristic of returning boomerangs was probably first noticed by early hunters trying to "tune" their throwing sticks to fly straight.

It is thought that the shape and elliptical flight path of the returning boomerang makes it useful for hunting birds and small animals, or that noise generated by the movement of the boomerang through the air, or, by a skilled thrower, lightly clipping leaves of a tree whose branches house birds, would help scare the birds towards the thrower. It is further supposed that this was used to frighten flocks or groups of birds into nets that were usually strung up between trees or thrown by hidden hunters. In southeastern Australia, it is claimed that boomerangs were made to hover over a flock of ducks; mistaking it for a hawk, the ducks would dive away, toward hunters armed with nets or clubs.

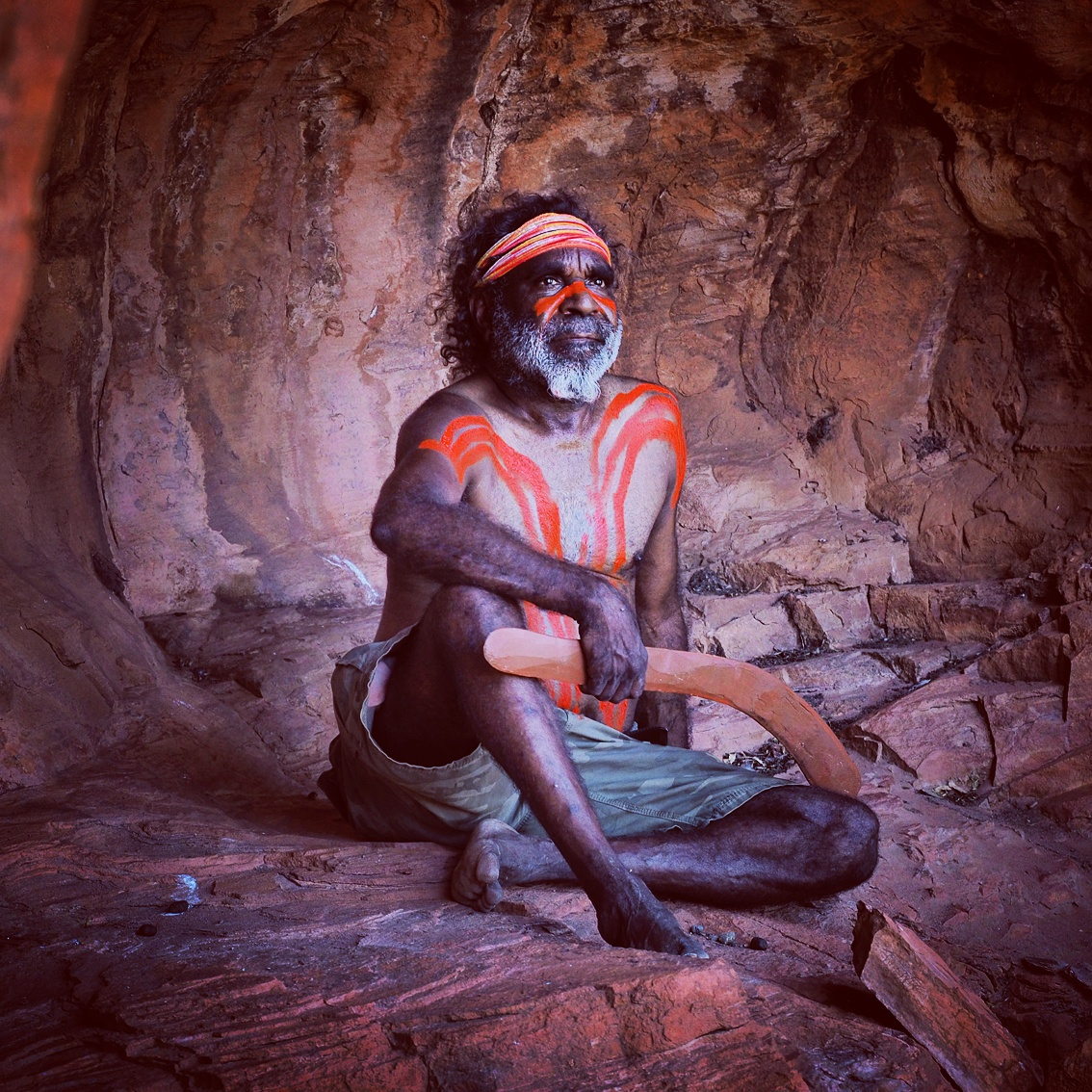
Aboriginal man with boomerang, Yuendumu, 2018

Traditionally, most hunting sticks used by Aboriginal groups in Australia were non-returning. These weapons, sometimes called "throwsticks" or "kylies", were used for hunting a variety of prey, from kangaroos to parrots; at a range of about 100 m (330 ft), a 2 kg (4.4 lb) non-returning boomerang could inflict mortal injury to a large animal.

Recent evidence also suggests that boomerangs were used as war weapons.

== Etymology ==
The origin of the term is uncertain, although it is known to be Australian.

David Collins listed "Wo-mur-rāng" as one of eight Aboriginal "Names of clubs" in 1798, but was probably referring to the woomera, which is actually a spear-thrower. An anonymous 1790 manuscript on Aboriginal languages of New South Wales reported "Boo-mer-rit" as "the Scimitar".

The first written record of a boomerang's return flight was made by a French-born ensign of the New South Wales Corps, Francis Louis Barrallier in November, 1802, but there had been reports of boomerangs in action by colonists of Sydney in the first few years of the colony. At Farm Cove (Port Jackson), in December 1804, a weapon was witnessed during a tribal skirmish, as recorded in the Sydney Gazette and New South Wales Advertiser:

... the white spectators were justly astonished at the dexterity and incredible force with which a bent, edged waddy resembling slightly a Turkish scimytar, was thrown by Bungary, a native distinguished by his remarkable courtesy. The weapon, thrown at 20 or 30 yards [18 or 27 m] distance, twirled round in the air with astonishing velocity, and alighting on the right arm of one of his opponents, actually rebounded to a distance not less than 70 or 80 yards [64 or 73 m], leaving a horrible contusion behind, and exciting universal admiration.

One source asserts that the term entered the language in 1827, adapted from an Aboriginal language of near Sydney, New South Wales, but mentions a variant, "wo-mur-rang", which it dates to 1798. In 1822, it was described in detail and recorded as a "bou-mar-rang" in the language of the Dharawal people (a sub-group of the Darug) of the Georges River near Port Jackson. The Dharawal used other words for their hunting sticks but used "boomerang" to refer to a returning throw-stick. Similarly, other Aboriginal peoples used different words for throwing sticks (non-returning) and returning weapons. The word was also spelt "bomerang", "bommerang", "bomring", "boomereng", "boomering", "bumerang", and other variants.

The word was adopted into International English, and also started to be used with a figurative meaning. An early example of its adoption into American English is found in Boston Daily Advertiser in 1846. From the 1850s, it started to be used as a verb in Australian English.

== Traditional styles and uses ==
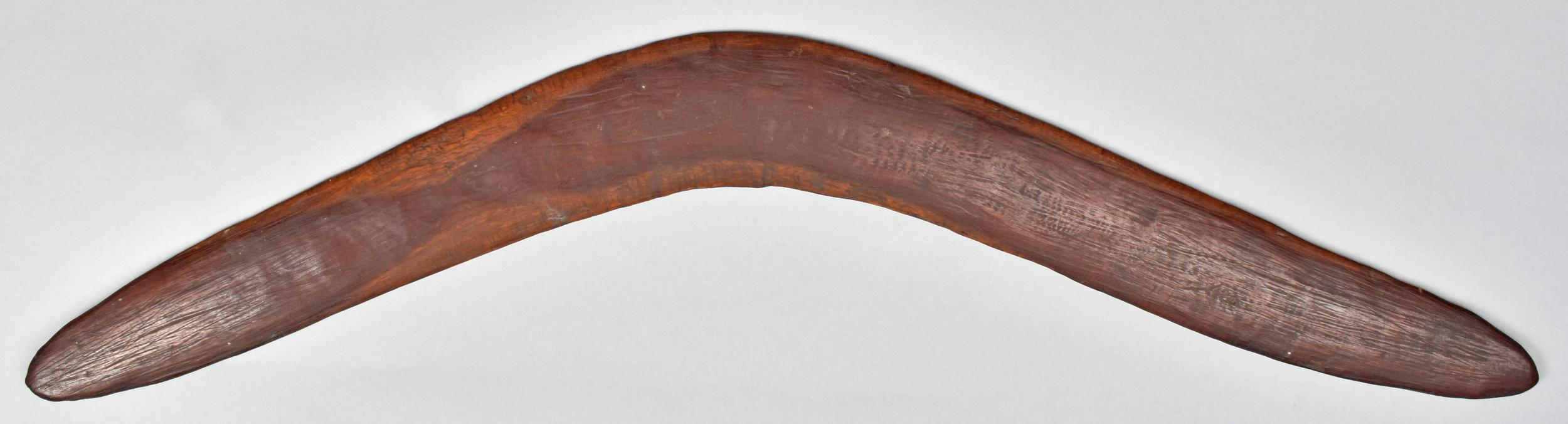
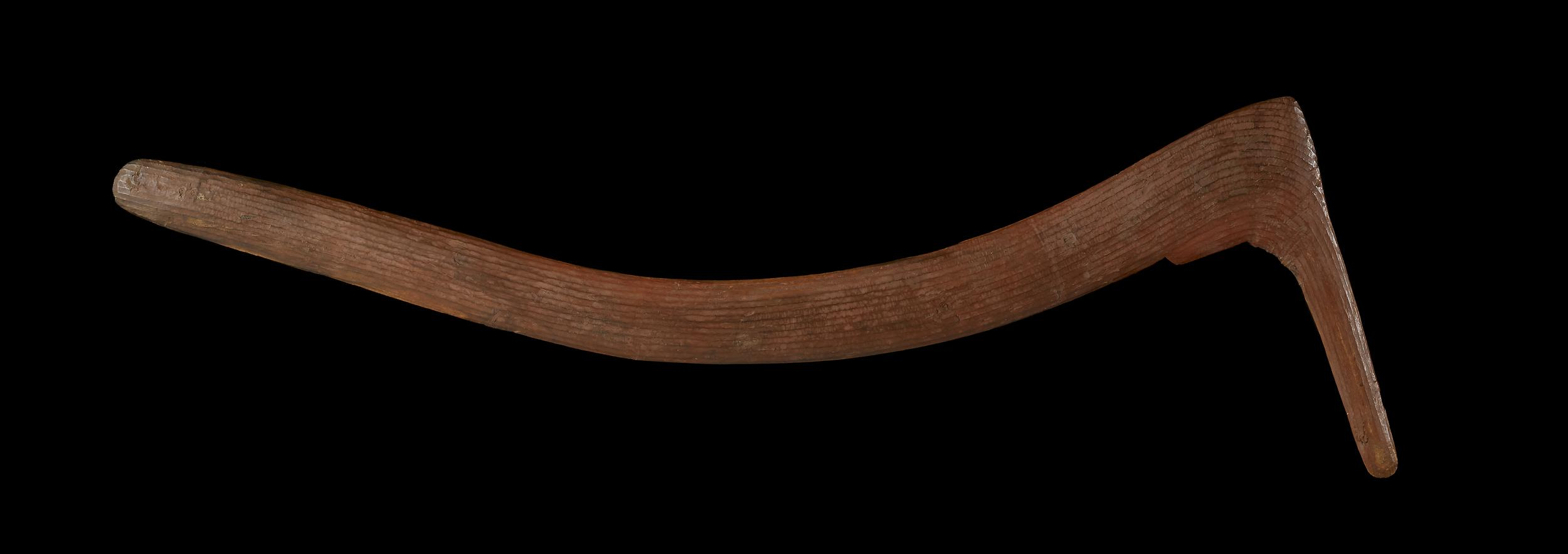
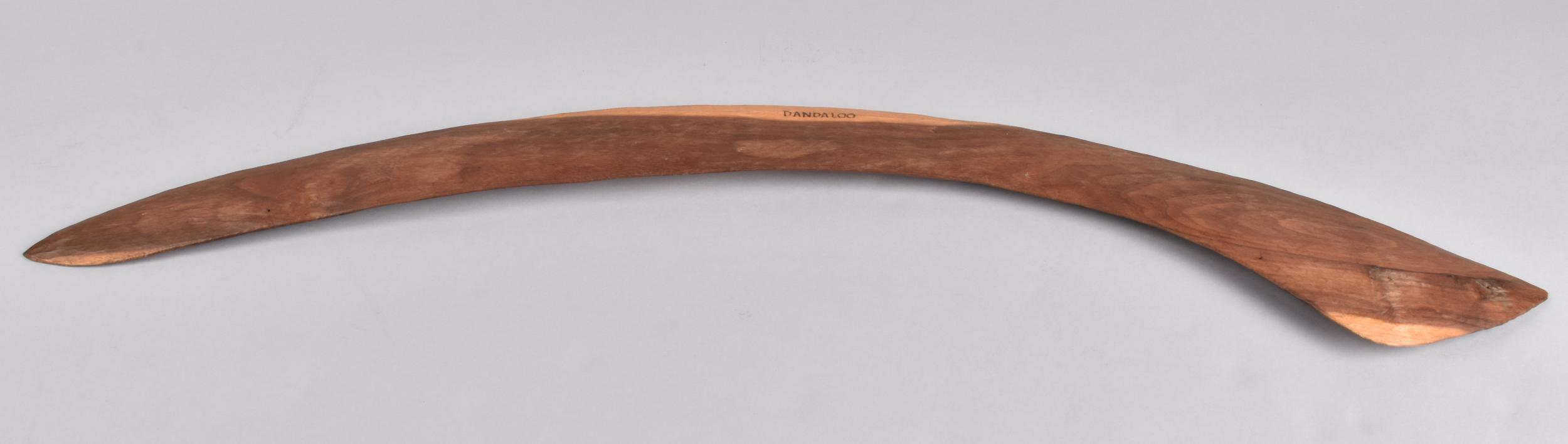
Three types of Australian Aboriginal boomerangs at the British Museum: a returning variant, a hooked melee "Number 7" variant, also known as a "Kylie", and a wedge boomerang

According to the Boomerang Throwing Association of New South Wales, only returning devices should be referred to as boomerangs, as this was the origin of the word. However, the term "non-returning boomerang" is commonly used to refer to a range of throwing sticks.

One of the traditional uses of a boomerang was for hunting birds, including emus, kangaroos, and smaller marsupials. This type of boomerang was either the same width from end to end, or had a broad middle and tapered at either end, with thin edges. They could travel very fast and so were effective and dangerous. Expert hunters are said to be able to kill an animal 160 m (520 ft) away. Another hunting technique involves hanging nets among a group of trees, and when a flock of birds flies above them, boomerangs would be thrown above the birds to resemble a bird of prey such as a hawk. The spooked flock would swoop down to escape the hawk, and fly into the nets. The classic returning boomerang was never used in warfare, owing to its wide arc.

Medium-weight "non-returning boomerangs" were sometimes used for fights at close quarters, by throwing them at the enemy, and larger ones (up to 2 m (6 ft 7 in) were used as fighting sticks. Heavier and wider hunting sticks sometimes called "non-returning boomerangs" were used to kill fish trapped in rock pools at low tide, and could also be used as a digging stick to forage for root vegetables and other uses.

Another use for boomerangs are in formal dance ceremonies, used both as percussion instruments (like clapsticks) and by dancers. Styles and decorations varied widely among clans and different Aboriginal groups across Australia, and were significant in the ceremonies.

Traditionally made boomerangs take a long time to make. After obtaining a suitably shaped piece of wood from a tree, it would be left to dry out for weeks, before the maker would sit scraping it back for days and days to achieve the required shape. Few are made by this method today, with some exceptions being in some remote areas of Western Australia and the Northern Territory. These are mostly non-returning boomerangs, used for hunting. In La Perouse in Sydney, and on Palm Island, Queensland, they are made for the tourist trade.

== Modern styles and uses ==
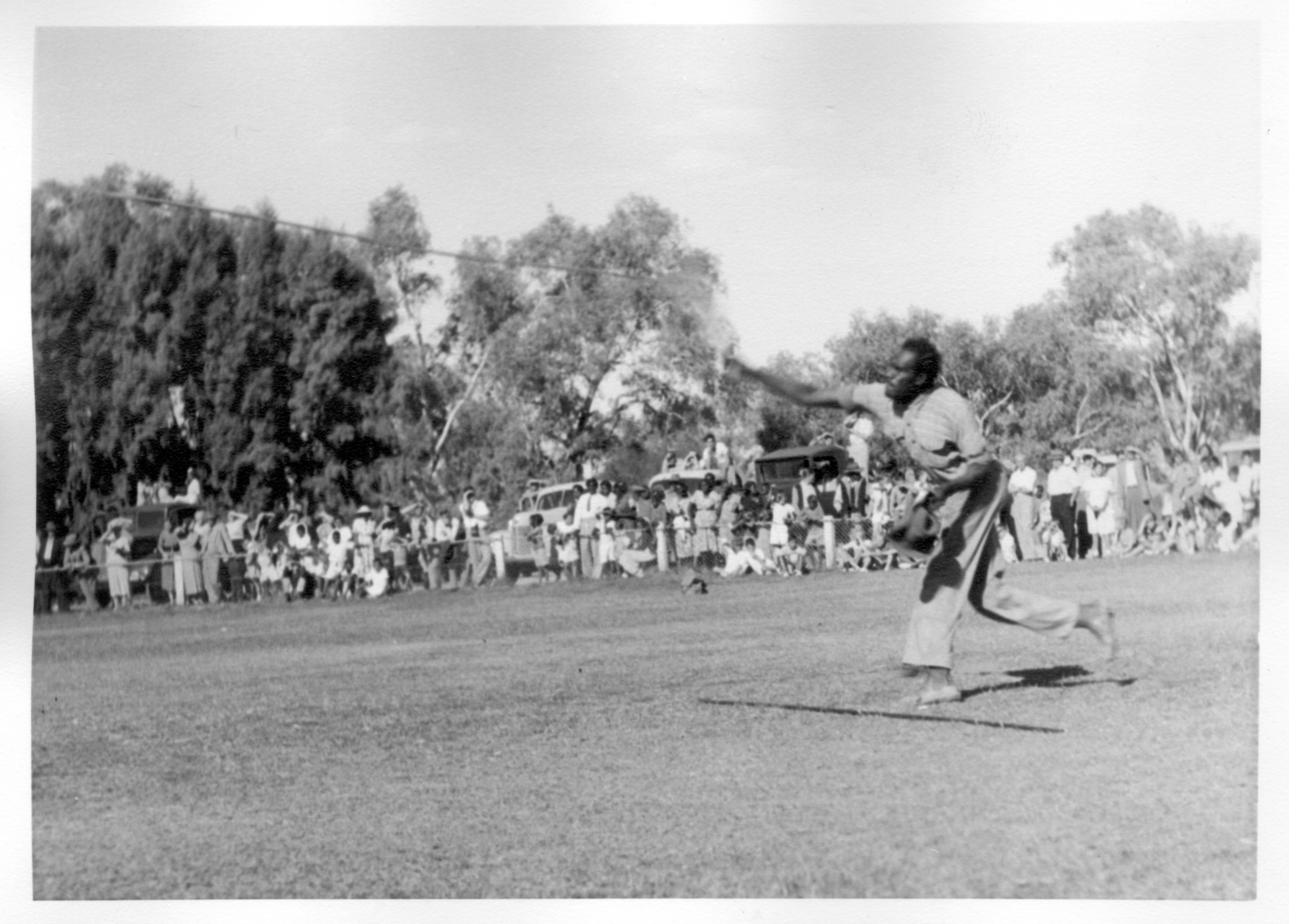
A boomerang throwing event in Alice Springs (Mparntwe), c. 1950s

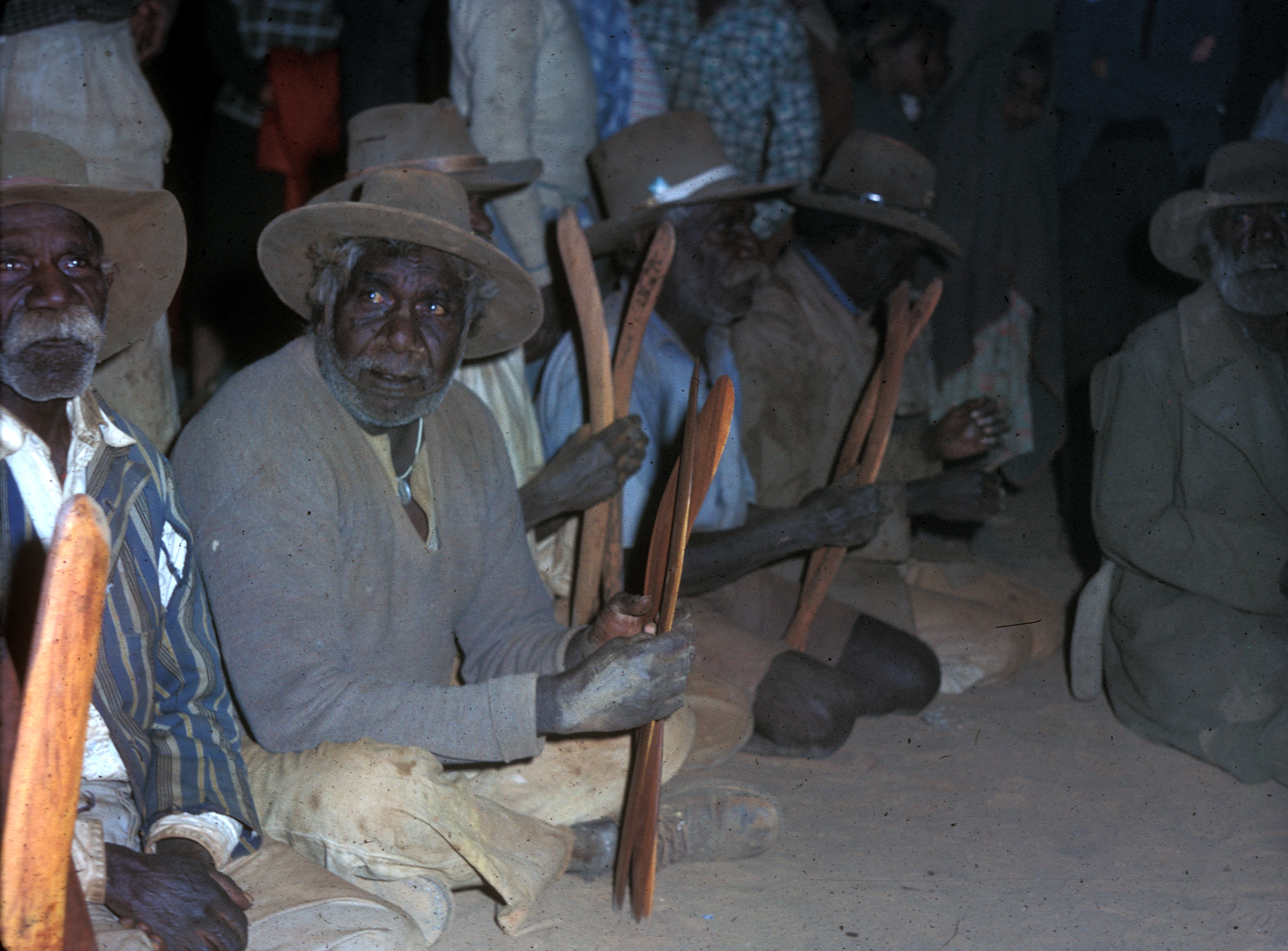
Aboriginal men with boomerangs in Alice Springs (Mparntwe), c.1960s

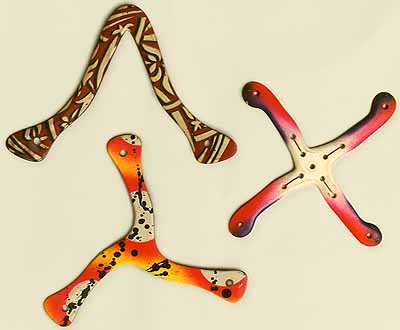
Sport boomerangs

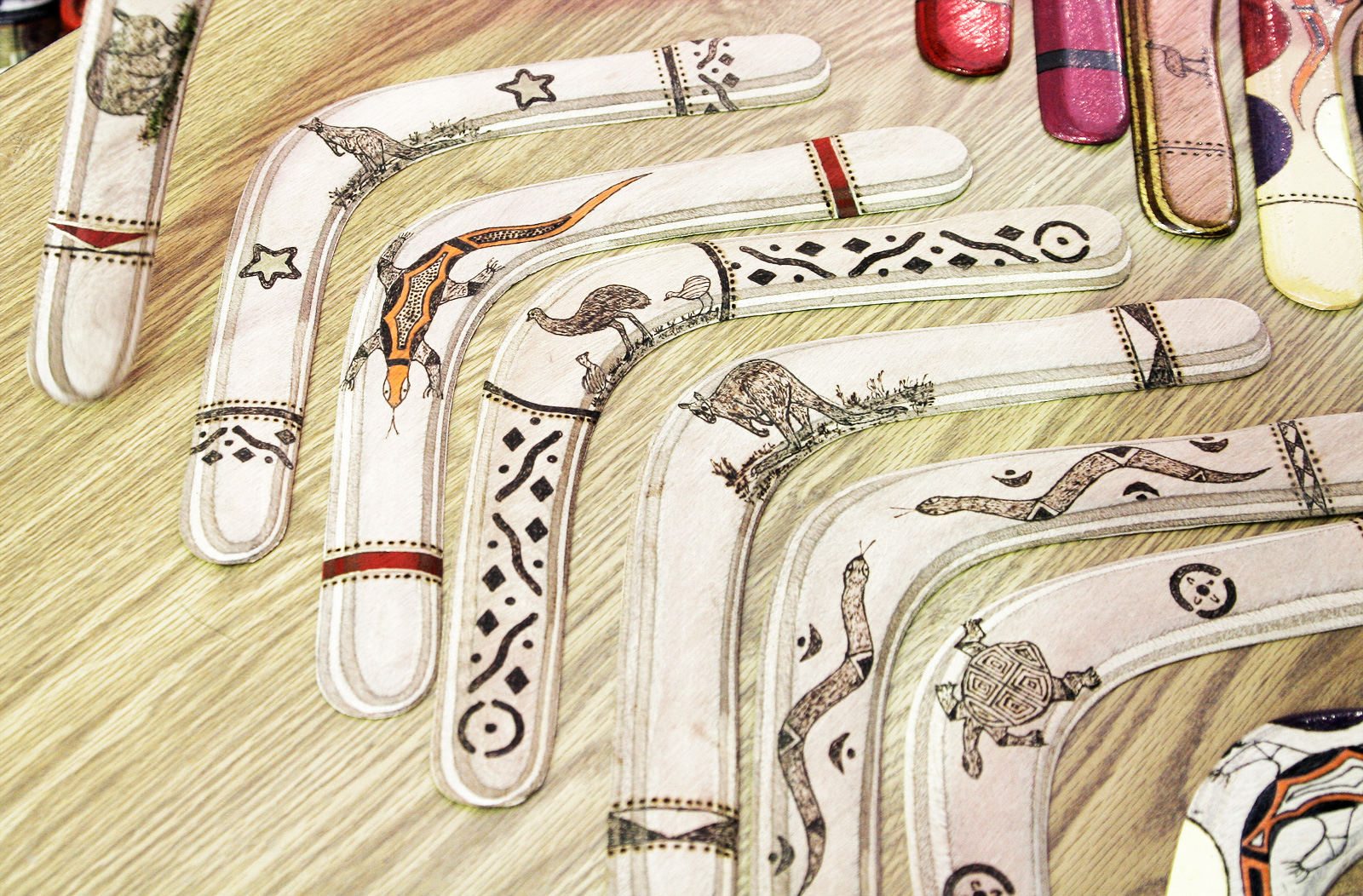
Boomerangs for sale at the 2005 Melbourne Show

Beginning in the later part of the twentieth century, there has been a bloom in the independent creation of unusually designed art boomerangs. These often have little or no resemblance to the traditional historical ones and on first sight some of these objects may not look like boomerangs at all. The use of modern thin plywoods and synthetic plastics have greatly contributed to their success. Designs are very diverse and can range from animal inspired forms, humorous themes, complex calligraphic and symbolic shapes, to the purely abstract. Painted surfaces are similarly richly diverse. Some boomerangs made primarily as art objects do not have the required aerodynamic properties to return.

Boomerangs are mostly used for recreation today. Modern boomerangs used for sport can be made from Finnish birch plywood, hardwood, or plastics such as ABS, polypropylene, phenolic paper, or carbon fibre-reinforced plastics. Most sport boomerangs typically weigh less than 100 g (3.5 oz), with MTA boomerangs (boomerangs used for the maximum-time-aloft event) often under 25 g (0.88 oz). There are different types of throwing contests: accuracy of return; Aussie round; trick catch; maximum time aloft; fast catch; and endurance (see below).

Boomerangs have also been suggested as an alternative to clay pigeons in shotgun sports, where the flight of the boomerang better mimics the flight of a bird, offering a more challenging target.

The modern boomerang is often computer-aided designed with precision airfoils. The number of "wings" is often more than 2 as more lift is provided by 3 or 4 wings than by 2. Among the latest inventions is a round-shaped boomerang, which has a different look but uses the same returning principle as traditional boomerangs. This allows for a safer catch for players.

== Aerodynamics ==
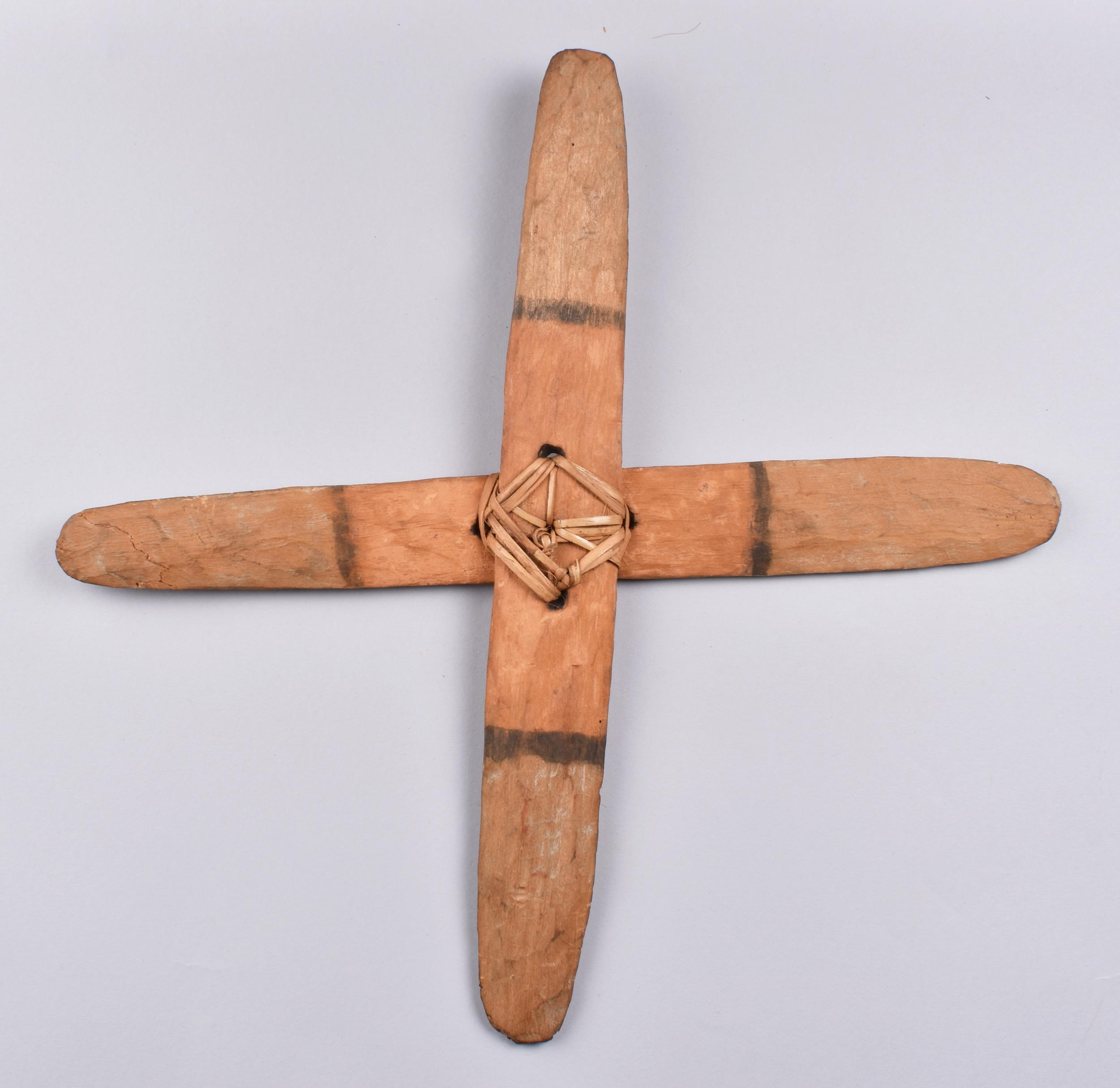
A cross-shaped toy boomerang at the British Museum

A boomerang is a throwing stick with aerodynamic properties, traditionally made of wood, which returns to the thrower after an elliptical flight. "Classic" boomerangs usually follow a circular trajectory, or sometimes in the shape of a teardrop. Its range varies from 3–60 m (9.8–196.9 ft). Hunting, or non-returning, boomerangs, fly in a straight line, usually 40–90 m (130–300 ft). There are also long-range boomerangs, which differ in design and fly in an S-shape. Wind affects the flight paths of all types of boomerang.

A returning boomerang is a rotating wing. It consists of two or more arms, or wings, connected at an angle; each wing is shaped as an airfoil section. Although it is not a requirement that a boomerang be in its traditional shape, it is usually flat. Boomerangs can be made for right- or left-handed throwers. The difference between right and left is subtle, the planform is the same but the leading edges of the aerofoil sections are reversed. A right-handed boomerang makes a counter-clockwise, circular flight to the left while a left-handed boomerang flies clockwise to the right. Most sport boomerangs weigh between 70 and 110 g (2.5 and 3.9 oz), have a 250–300 mm (9.8–11.8 in) wingspan, and a 20–40 m (66–131 ft) range.

A falling boomerang starts spinning, and most then fall in a spiral. When the boomerang is thrown with high spin, a boomerang flies in a curved rather than a straight line. When thrown correctly, a boomerang returns to its starting point. As the wing rotates and the boomerang moves through the air, the airflow over the wings creates lift on both "wings". However, during one-half of each blade's rotation, it sees a higher airspeed, because the rotation tip speed and the forward speed add, and when it is in the other half of the rotation, the tip speed subtracts from the forward speed. Thus if thrown nearly upright, each blade generates more lift at the top than the bottom. While it might be expected that this would cause the boomerang to tilt around the axis of travel, because the boomerang has significant angular momentum, the gyroscopic precession causes the plane of rotation to tilt about an axis that is 90 degrees to the direction of flight, causing it to turn. When thrown in the horizontal plane, as with a Frisbee, instead of in the vertical, the same gyroscopic precession will cause the boomerang to fly violently, straight up into the air and then crash.

Fast Catch boomerangs usually have three or more symmetrical wings (seen from above), whereas a Long Distance boomerang is most often shaped similar to a question mark. Maximum Time Aloft boomerangs mostly have one wing considerably longer than the other. This feature, along with carefully executed bends and twists in the wings help to set up an "auto-rotation" effect to maximise the boomerang's hover time in descending from the highest point in its flight.

Some boomerangs have turbulators — bumps or pits on the top surface that act to increase the lift as boundary layer transition activators (to keep attached turbulent flow instead of laminar separation).

In 1992, German astronaut Ulf Merbold performed an experiment aboard Spacelab that established that boomerangs function in zero gravity as they do on Earth. French Astronaut Jean-François Clervoy aboard Mir repeated this in 1997. In 2008, Japanese astronaut Takao Doi again repeated the experiment on board the International Space Station.

== Throwing technique ==
Boomerangs are generally thrown in unobstructed, open spaces at least twice as large as the range of the boomerang. The flight direction to the left or right depends upon the design of the boomerang itself, not the thrower. A right-handed or left-handed boomerang can be thrown with either hand, but throwing a boomerang with the non-matching hand requires a throwing motion that many throwers find awkward. The following technique applies to a right-handed boomerang; the directions are mirrored for a left-handed boomerang. Different boomerang designs have different flight characteristics and are suitable for different conditions. The accuracy of the throw depends on understanding the weight and aerodynamics of that particular boomerang, and the strength, consistency and direction of the wind; from this, the thrower chooses the angle of tilt, the angle against the wind, the elevation of the trajectory, the degree of spin and the strength of the throw. A great deal of trial and error is required to perfect the throw over time.

A properly thrown boomerang will travel out parallel to the ground, sometimes climbing gently, perform a graceful, anti-clockwise, circular or tear-drop shaped arc, flatten out and return in a hovering motion, coming in from the left or spiralling in from behind. Ideally, the hover will allow a practiced catcher to clamp their hands shut horizontally on the boomerang from above and below, sandwiching the centre between their hands.

The grip used depends on size and shape; smaller boomerangs are held between finger and thumb at one end, while larger, heavier or wider boomerangs need one or two fingers wrapped over the top edge in order to induce a spin. The aerofoil-shaped section must face the inside of the thrower, and the flatter side outwards. It is usually inclined outwards, from a nearly vertical position to 20° or 30°; the stronger the wind, the closer to vertical. The elbow of the boomerang can point forwards or backwards, or it can be gripped for throwing; it just needs to start spinning on the required inclination, in the desired direction, with the right force.

The boomerang is aimed to the right of the oncoming wind; the exact angle depends on the strength of the wind and the boomerang itself. Left-handed boomerangs are thrown to the left of the wind and will fly a clockwise flight path. The trajectory is either parallel to the ground or slightly upwards. The boomerang can return without the aid of any wind, but even very slight winds must be taken into account, however calm they might seem. Little or no wind is preferable for an accurate throw; light winds up to 3–5 knots (6–9 km/h; 3–6 mph) are manageable with skill. If the wind is strong enough to fly a kite, then it may be too strong unless a skilled thrower is using a boomerang designed for stability in stronger winds. Gusty days are a great challenge, and the thrower must be keenly aware of the ebb and flow of the wind strength, finding appropriate lulls in the gusts to launch their boomerang.

== Competitions and records ==
Boomerang
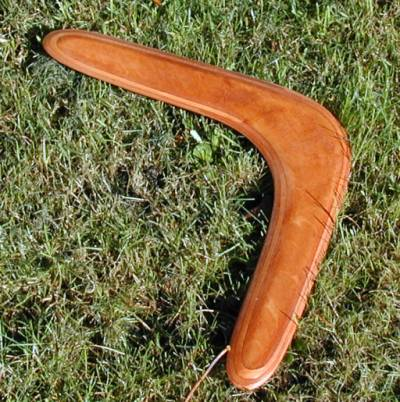
- Aerodynamic returning boomerang
- First played: Ancient

Characteristics
- Contact: No
- Mixed-sex: No
- Type: Throwing sport
- Equipment: Boomerang

Presence
- Country or region: Australia
- Olympic: No
- World Games: 1989 (invitational)

A world record achievement was made on 3 June 2007 by Tim Lendrum in Aussie Round. Lendrum scored 96 out of 100, giving him a national record as well as an equal world record throwing an "AYR" made by expert boomerang maker Adam Carroll.

In international competition, a world cup is held every second year. As of 2017, teams from Germany and the United States dominated international competition. The individual World Champion title was won in 2000, 2002, 2004, 2012, and 2016 by Swiss thrower Manuel Schütz. In 1992, 1998, 2006, and 2008 Fridolin Frost from Germany won the title.

The team competitions of 2012 and 2014 were won by Boomergang (an international team). World champions were Germany in 2012 and Japan in 2014 for the first time. Boomergang was formed by individuals from several countries, including the Colombian Alejandro Palacio. In 2016 USA became team world champion.

=== Competition disciplines ===
Modern boomerang tournaments usually involve some or all of the events listed below. In all disciplines the boomerang must travel at least 20 metres (66 ft) from the thrower. Throwing takes place individually. The thrower stands at the centre of concentric rings marked on an open field.

Events include:

- Aussie Round: considered by many to be the ultimate test of boomeranging skills. The boomerang should ideally cross the 50-metre (160 ft) circle and come right back to the centre. Each thrower has five attempts. Points are awarded for distance, accuracy and the catch.
- Accuracy: points are awarded according to how close the boomerang lands to the centre of the rings. The thrower must not touch the boomerang after it has been thrown. Each thrower has five attempts. In major competitions there are two accuracy disciplines: Accuracy 100 and Accuracy 50.
- Endurance: points are awarded for the number of catches achieved in 5 minutes.
- Fast Catch: the time taken to throw and catch the boomerang five times. The winner has the fastest timed catches.
- Trick Catch/Doubling: points are awarded for trick catches behind the back, between the feet, and so on. In Doubling, the thrower has to throw two boomerangs at the same time and catch them in sequence in a special way.
- Consecutive Catch: points are awarded for the number of catches achieved before the boomerang is dropped. The event is not timed.
- MTA 100 (Maximal Time Aloft, 100 metres (328 ft)): points are awarded for the length of time spent by the boomerang in the air. The field is normally a circle measuring 100 m. An alternative to this discipline, without the 100 m restriction is called MTA unlimited.
- Long Distance: the boomerang is thrown from the middle point of a 40-metre (130 ft) baseline. The furthest distance travelled by the boomerang away from the baseline is measured. On returning, the boomerang must cross the baseline again but does not have to be caught. A special section is dedicated to LD below.
- Juggling: as with Consecutive Catch, only with two boomerangs. At any given time one boomerang must be in the air.

=== World records ===
As of September 2017

Sport boomerang world records
| Discipline | Result | Name | Year | Tournament |
|---|---|---|---|---|
| Accuracy 100 | 99 points | (Germany) Alex Opri | 2007 | (Italy) Viareggio |
| Aussie Round | 99 points | (Germany) Fridolin Frost | 2007 | (Italy) Viareggio |
| Endurance | 81 catches | (Switzerland) Manuel Schütz | 2005 | (Italy) Milan |
| Fast Catch | 14.07 s | (Switzerland) Manuel Schütz | 2017 | (France) Besançon |
| Trick Catch/Doubling | 533 points | (Switzerland) Manuel Schütz | 2009 | (France) Bordeaux |
| Consecutive Catch | 2251 catches | (Japan) Haruki Taketomi | 2009 | Japan |
| MTA 100 | 139.10 s | (United States) Nick Citoli | 2010 | (Italy) Rome |
| MTA unlimited | 380.59 s | (United States) Billy Brazelton | 2010 | (Italy) Rome |
| Long Distance | 238 m | (Switzerland) Manuel Schütz | 1999 | (Switzerland) Kloten |

=== Guinness World Records ===
==== Smallest returning boomerang ====
Non-discipline record: Smallest Returning Boomerang (Guinness World Record): Sadir Kattan of Australia in 1997 with 48 mm (1.9 in) long and 46 mm (1.8 in) wide. This tiny boomerang flew the required 20 m (66 ft), before returning to the accuracy circles on 22 March 1997 at the Australian National Championships.

==== Longest throw of any object by a human ====
A boomerang was used to set a Guinness World Record with a throw of 427.2 m (1,402 ft) by David Schummy on 15 March 2005 at Murarrie Recreation Ground, Australia. This broke the record set by Erin Hemmings who threw an Aerobie 406.3 m (1,333 ft) on 14 July 2003 at Fort Funston, San Francisco.

== Related terms ==
In the Noongar language, a kylie is a flat curved piece of wood similar in appearance to a boomerang that is thrown when hunting for birds and animals. "Kylie" is one of the Aboriginal words for the hunting stick used in warfare and for hunting animals. Instead of following curved flight paths, kylies fly in straight lines from the throwers. They are typically much larger than boomerangs, and can travel very long distances; due to their size and hook shapes, they can cripple or kill an animal or human opponent. The word is perhaps an English corruption of a word meaning "boomerang" taken from one of the Western Desert languages, for example, the Warlpiri word "karli".

== Cultural references ==
Trademarks of Australian companies using the boomerang as a symbol, emblem or logo proliferate, usually removed from Aboriginal context and symbolising "returning" or to distinguish an Australian brand. Early examples included Bain's White Ant Exterminator (1896); Webendorfer Bros. explosives (1898); E. A. Adams Foods (1920); and by the (still current) Boomerang Cigarette Papers Pty. Ltd.

"Aboriginalia", including the boomerang, as symbols of Australia dates from the late 1940s and early 1950s and was in widespread use by a largely European arts, crafts and design community. By the 1960s, the Australian tourism industry extended it to the very branding of Australia, particularly to overseas and domestic tourists as souvenirs and gifts and thus Aboriginal culture. At the very time when Aboriginal people and culture were subject to policies that removed them from their traditional lands and sought to assimilate them (physiologically and culturally) into mainstream white Australian culture, causing the Stolen Generations, Aboriginalia found an ironically "nostalgic" entry point into Australian popular culture at important social locations: holiday resorts and in Australian domestic interiors. In the 21st century, souvenir objects depicting Aboriginal peoples, symbolism and motifs including the boomerang, from the 1940s–1970s, regarded as kitsch and sold largely to tourists in the first instance, became more sought after by Aboriginal and non-Aboriginal collectors, and drew attention from Aboriginal artists and cultural commentators.

== See also ==
- List of martial arts weapons
- Australian Aboriginal artefacts
- Cateia, an ancient European and North African throwing weapon
- Chakram, an Indian throwing weapon
- Imperial boomerang, a concept in political science
- Throwing stick, used in Australia
- Valari, an Indian throwing weapon
