= Tomahawk =

North American indigenous axe

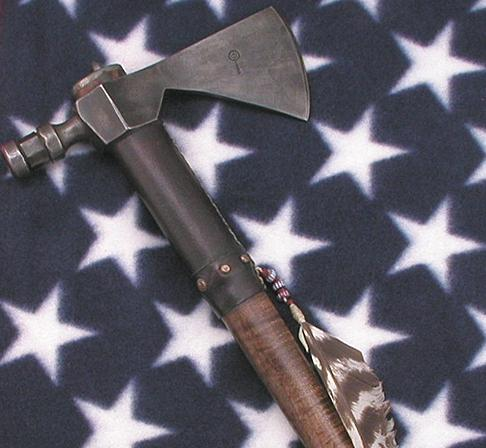
Pipe tomahawk

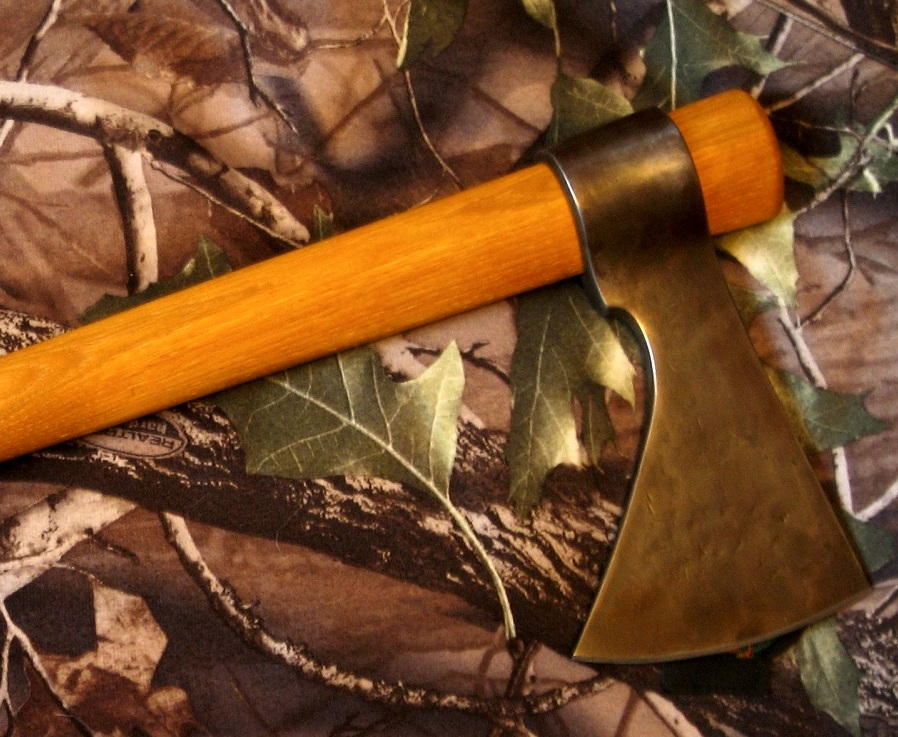
Modern commercial tomahawk

A tomahawk is a type of single-handed axe used by many Indigenous groups in North America. It traditionally resembles a hatchet with a straight shaft.

== Etymology ==
The name comes from Powhatan tamahaac, derived from the Proto-Algonquian root *temah- 'to cut off by tool'. Alternative sources state that it derived from the Algonquian word otomahuk (“to knock down”).

Algonquian cognates include Lenape təmahikan, Malecite-Passamaquoddy tomhikon, and Abenaki demahigan, all of which mean 'axe'.

The term came into the English language in the 17th century as an adaptation of the Powhatan (Virginian Algonquian) word.

== History ==
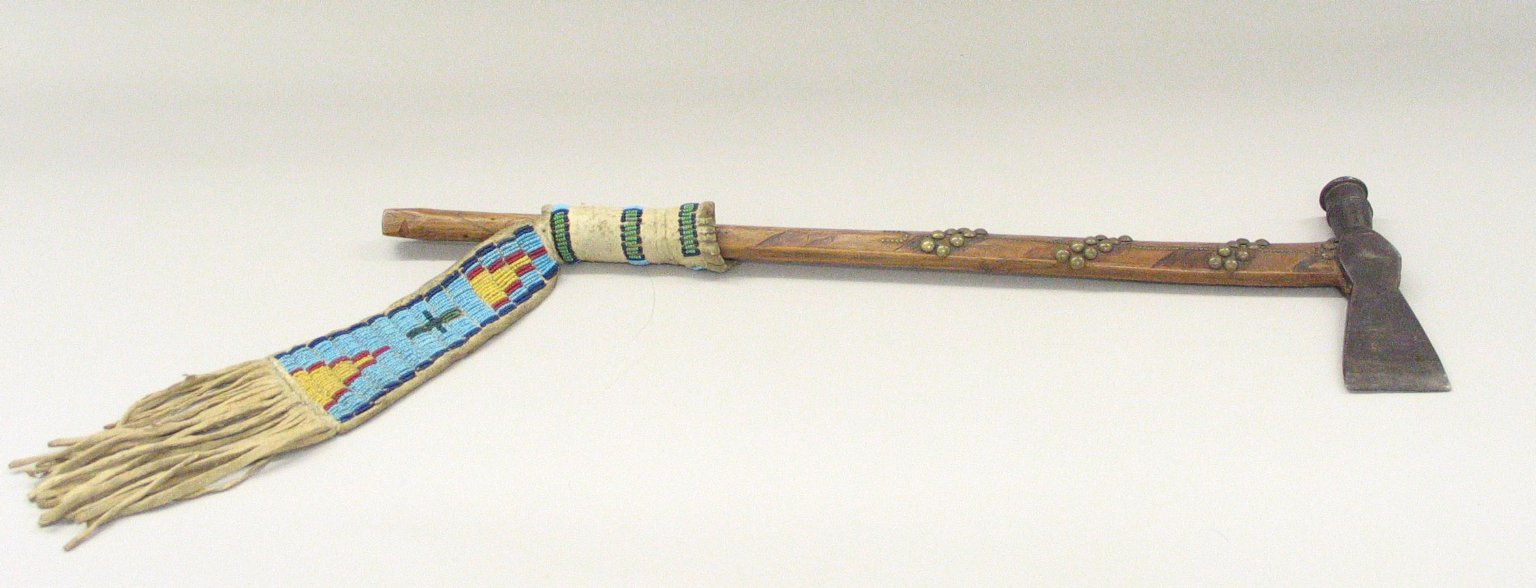
Tomahawk, Oglala, Lakota, Sioux (Native American), late 19th-early 20th century, Brooklyn Museum

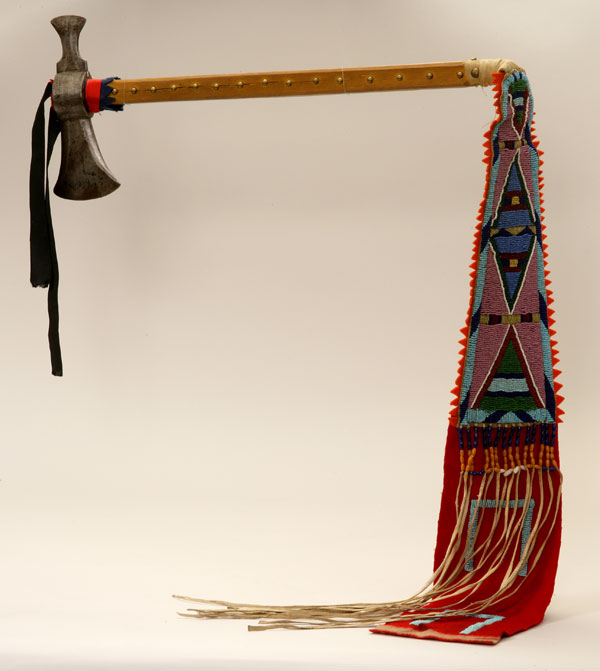
Nez Perce tomahawk

Before Europeans came to the continent, Native Americans would use stones, sharpened by a process of knapping and pecking, attached to wooden handles, secured with strips of rawhide. The tomahawk was created by the Algonquian people. It quickly spread from the Algonquian culture to the tribes of the South and the Great Plains.

Native Americans created a tomahawk’s poll, the side opposite the blade, which consisted of a hammer, spike or pipe. These became known as pipe tomahawks, which consisted of a bowl on the poll and a hollowed out shaft. These were created by European and American artisans for trade and diplomatic gifts for the tribes.

In pre-colonial times the head was made of stone, bone, or antler, and European settlers later introduced heads of iron and steel.

Tomahawks were general-purpose tools used by Native Americans and later the European colonials with whom they traded, and often employed as a hand-to-hand weapon.

The metal tomahawk heads were originally based on a Royal Navy boarding axe (a lightweight hand axe designed to cut through boarding nets when boarding hostile ships) and used as a trade-item with Native Americans for food and other provisions.

== Composition ==
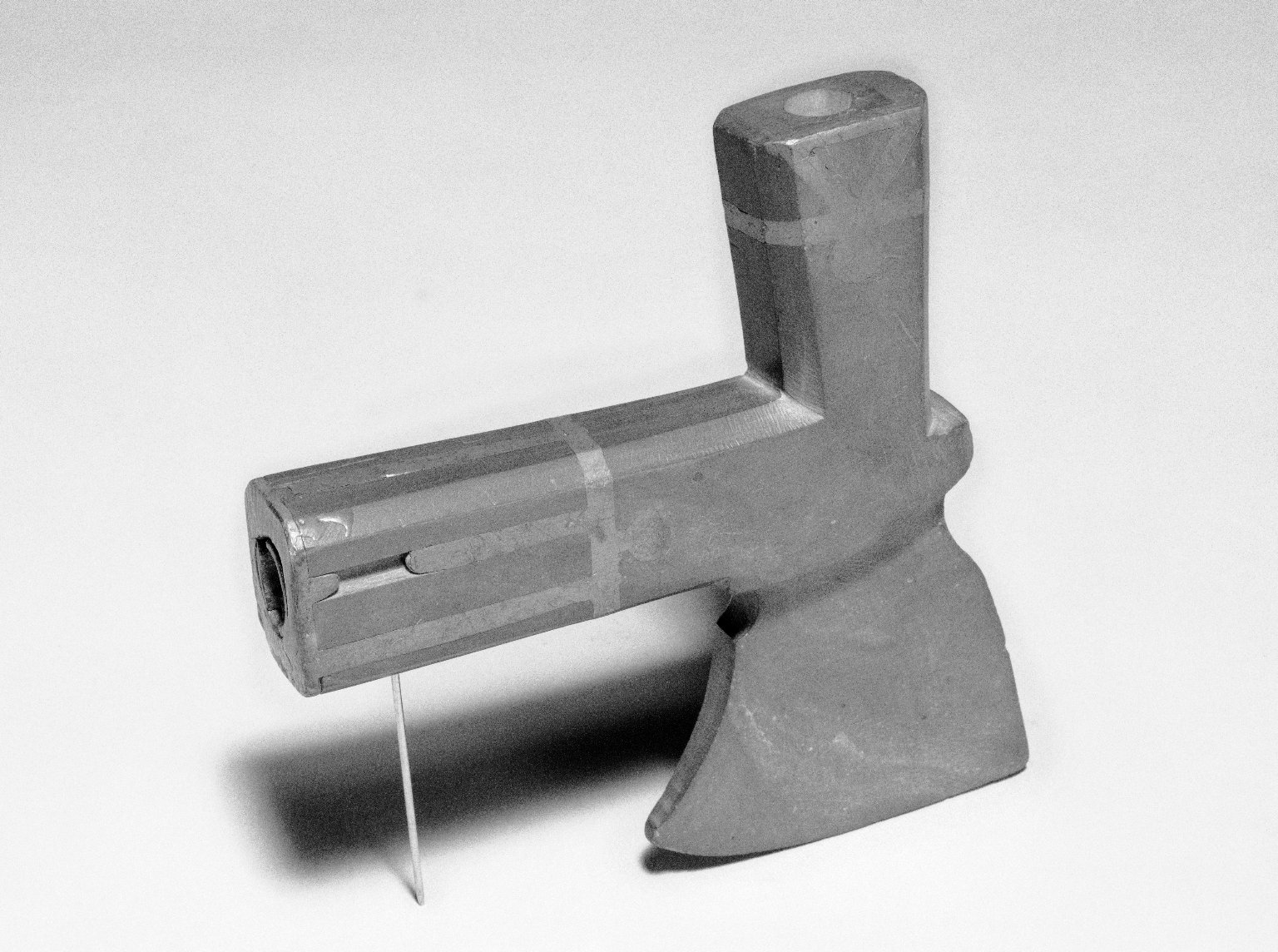
Inlaid tomahawk pipe bowl, early 19th century, Brooklyn Museum

=== Original models ===
The tomahawk's original designs were fitted with heads of bladed or rounded stone or deer antler.

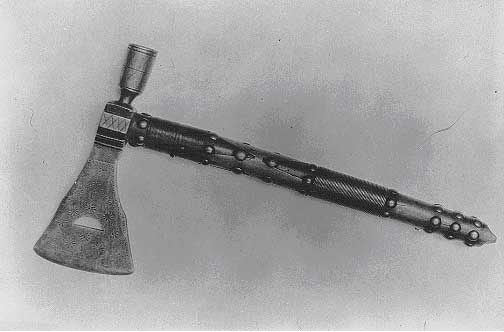
A pipe tomahawk dating to the early 19th century

According to Mike Haskew, the modern tomahawk shaft is usually less than 2 ft (61 cm) in length, traditionally made of hickory, ash, or maple.

The heads weigh anywhere from 9 to 20 oz (260 to 570 g), with a cutting edge usually not much longer than four inches (10 cm) from toe to heel.

The poll can feature a hammer, spike, or may simply be rounded off, and they usually do not have lugs.

=== Colonial period models ===
European traders brought with them metal axe-heads, which Native Americans and white settlers alike adapted into their tomahawk designs.

From the 1800s onward, these sometimes had a pipe-bowl carved into the poll, and a hole drilled down the center of the shaft for smoking tobacco through the metal head.

Pipe tomahawks are artifacts unique to North America, created by Europeans as trade objects but often exchanged as diplomatic gifts. They were symbols of the choice Europeans and Native Americans faced whenever they met: one end was the pipe of peace, the other an axe of war.

In colonial French territory, a different tomahawk design, closer to the ancient European francisca, was in use by French settlers and local peoples. In the late 18th century, the British Army issued tomahawks to their colonial regulars during the American Revolutionary War as a weapon and tool.

=== Contemporary models ===
Many of these modern tomahawks are made of drop forged, differentially heat treated, alloy steel.

The differential heat treatment allows for the chopping portion and the spike to be harder than the middle section, allowing for a shock-resistant body with a durable temper.

==== Competition-based ====
The tomahawk competitions have regulations concerning the type and style of tomahawk used for throwing.

Today's hand-forged tomahawks are being made by master craftsmen throughout the United States.

There are special throwing tomahawks made for competitions such as the World Axe Throwing League. Requirements such as a minimum handle length and a maximum blade edge are dictated by each organizing body of competition in its rules.

==== Law enforcement use ====
Some companies produce "tactical tomahawks" marketed as SWAT oriented tools. Some designs include multiple uses wherein the shaft is designed as a pry bar.

== Modern use ==
=== Civilian use ===
Tomahawks are useful in camping and bushcraft scenarios. They are mostly used as an alternative to a hatchet, as they are generally lighter and slimmer than hatchets. They often contain other tools in addition to the axe head, such as spikes or hammers.

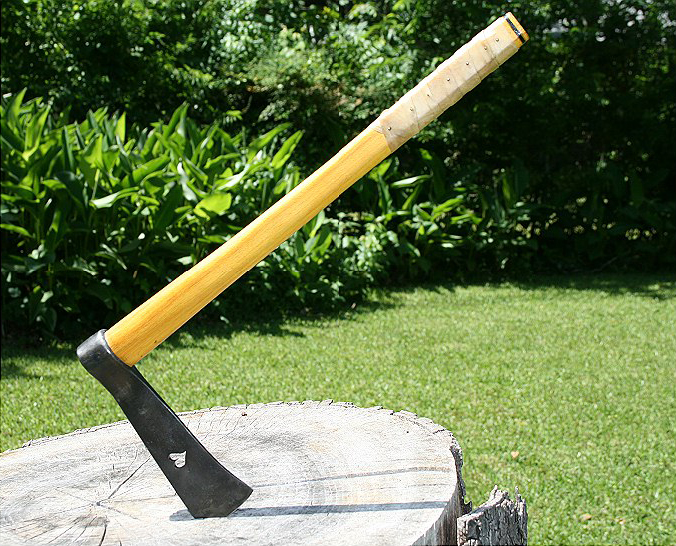
Traditional form tomahawk

These modern tomahawks have gained popularity with their reemergence by American Tomahawk Company in the beginning of 2001 and a collaboration with custom knife-maker Ernest Emerson of Emerson Knives, Inc. A similar wood handle Vietnam tomahawk is produced today by Cold Steel.

A tomahawk is one of the weapons carried by Gombey dance troupes of Bermuda, that perform a ritual war dance.

=== Tomahawk throwing ===
Francisca forged in a modern Tomahawk shape

Tomahawk throwing is a popular sport among American and Canadian historical reenactment groups, and new martial arts such as Okichitaw have begun to revive tomahawk fighting techniques used during the colonial era.

=== Military application ===
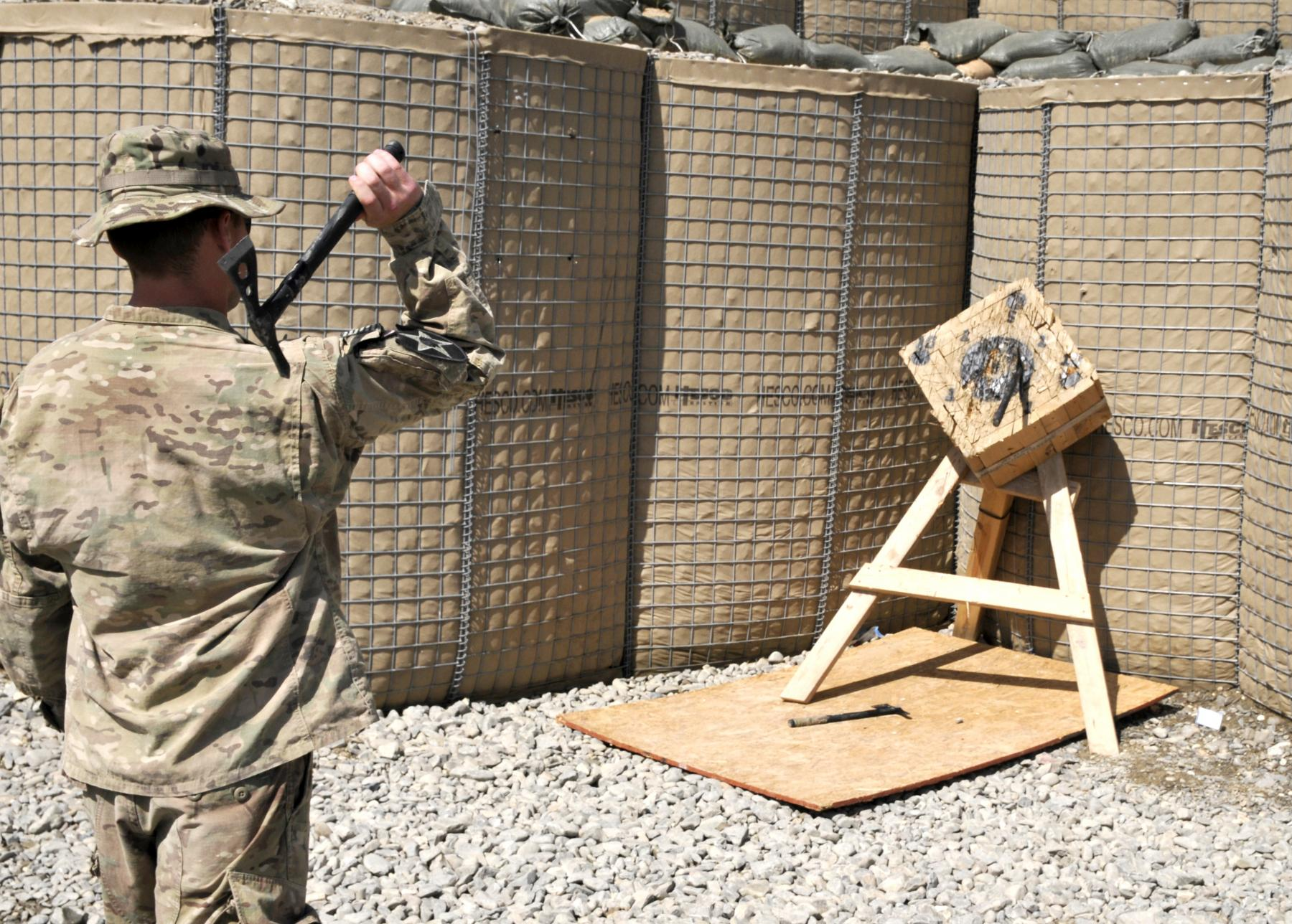
A US Army soldier throws a tomahawk as part of the Top Tomahawk competition at Forward Operating Base Spin Boldak in Kandahar, Afghanistan.

Modern, non-traditional tomahawks were used by selected units of the US armed forces as weapons during the Vietnam War and are referred to as "Vietnam tomahawks".

Tomahawks were used by individual members of the US Army Stryker Brigade in Afghanistan, the 172nd Stryker Brigade Combat Team based at Grafenwöhr (Germany), the 3rd Brigade, 2nd Infantry Division out of Fort Lewis, a reconnaissance platoon in the 2d Squadron 183d Cavalry (116th Infantry Brigade Combat Team) (OIF 2007–2008) and numerous other soldiers.

The tomahawk was issued a NATO stock number (4210-01-518-7244) and classified as a "Class 9 rescue kit" as a result of a program called the Rapid Fielding Initiative; it is also included within every Stryker vehicle as the "modular entry tool set".

This design enjoyed something of a renaissance with US soldiers in Iraq and Afghanistan as a tool and in use in hand-to-hand combat.

=== Modern fighting ===
Tomahawks are among the weapons used in the Filipino martial art escrima.

== Popular culture ==
In the 20th and 21st century, tomahawks have been prominently featured in films and video games (e.g. Dances with Wolves; Last of the Mohicans; The Patriot; Jonah Hex; Prey; Abraham Lincoln: Vampire Hunter; Bullet to the Head; Call of Duty: Black Ops; Red Dead Redemption and its sequel, and Assassin's Creed III; Resident Evil: Requiem), leading to increased interest among the public.

== See also ==
- Foam tomahawk
- Hurlbat
- Mambele/Hunga Munga
- Native American weaponry
- Shepherd's axe
- Tomahawk chop
