= Hurlbat =

Historical weapon

A hurlbat (or whirlbat, whorlbat) is a weapon of unclear original definition. Older reference works refer to it largely as a type of club, either held in the hand or thrown. Modern usage appears to refer to a type of throwing axe.

== Historical references ==
- Hurlebat, Hurlebatte and Hurlebadde are documented as a by-name in English patent rolls as early as 1305, and are attested namely in Berkshire, Essex and Hampshire (i.e., the historical Essex and eastern Wessex) at least until the early 15th century.
- About 1440–1450, the hurlebatte was mentioned in Jacob's Well: An English Treatise on the Cleansing of Man's Conscience, in the context of leisurely swordsmanship: "[P]leying at þe two hande swerd, at swerd & bokelere, & at two pyked staf, at þe hurlebatte [...]."
- The 1538 Dictionary of syr Thomas Elyot knyght uses hurlebatte to translate a Latin word, and describes a throwing/retrieving action: "Adides, short battes of a cubyte longe and an halfe, hauynge pikes of yron in theym, and were tyed to a lyne, that whanne they were throwen, he that did cast thẽ, mought plucke them agayn vnto him, hurlebattes." Adides is a misreading or printing error of aclides (see aklys).
- Thomas Blount's 1707 English dictionary Glossographia Anglicana Nova defined whorlbat as "a kind of Gauntlet with Straps and leaden Plummets, uſed by the ancient Heroes in their ſolemn Games and Exerciſes." (i.e., a cestus).
- An 1837 edition of the Samuel Johnson dictionary simply defined hurlbat (or whirlbat) as "a weapon".
- The 1854 edition of John Craig's dictionary defined hurlbat/whirlbat as "an old kind of weapon".
- The 1856 German-English dictionary of Johann Gottfried Flügel defined whirlbat (or hurlibat) as a club that is swung, such as a mace.
- In 1881, surnames derived from the by-name of 500 years ago were uncommon, and attested mainly throughout North West England to the Midlands (Hurlbutt), in Leicester (Hurlbert, Hurlburt and Hurlbut), Surrey (Hurlbatt) and Tynemouth (Harlbut). Except for Surrey, whose version is closest to the Medieval original, these regions are to the north of the name's distribution in the 14th-century.
- The 1911 Century Dictionary and Cyclopedia notes it to be "a kind of club or cudgel, so called because whirled around the head. It does not appear that such a weapon was thrown."

Thus, in the Middle Ages, the term referred to an aklys-type spiked club attached to a string, used for throwing and perhaps as target in swordsmanship training. After 1700, however, this meaning became quickly obscure, and eventually the hurlbat was imagined as a bludgeoning weapon that was swung, not thrown.

== See also ==
- Cateia
