= Throwing axe =

Small axe designed for use as a hand-thrown projectile

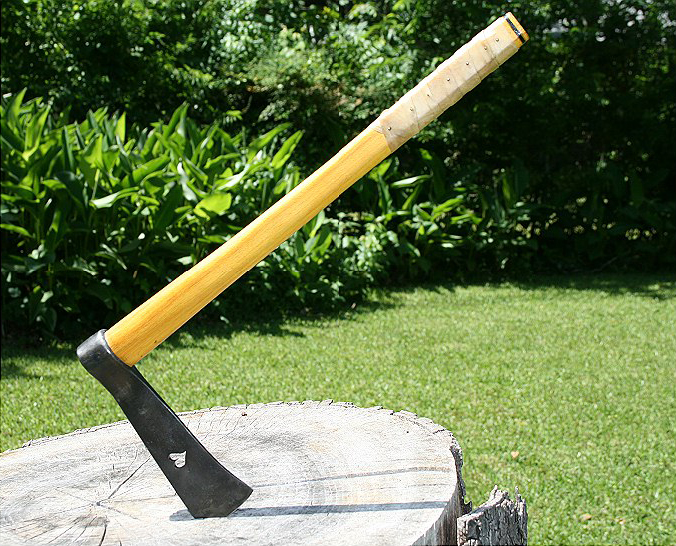
Traditional form tomahawk

A throwing axe is a weapon used from Antiquity to the Middle Ages by foot soldiers and occasionally by mounted soldiers. Usually, they are thrown in an overhand motion in a manner that causes the axe to rotate as it travels through the air.

Axe throwing is a sport in which the competitor throws an axe at a target, attempting to hit the bullseye as near as possible like that of archery. Axe throwing is an event held in most lumberjack competitions. A skilled axe thrower will rotate the throwing axe exactly once throughout the flight so that the sharpened edge of the head will penetrate the target. Throwing axes are becoming popular among outdoor enthusiasts as a throwing tool.

== Francisca ==
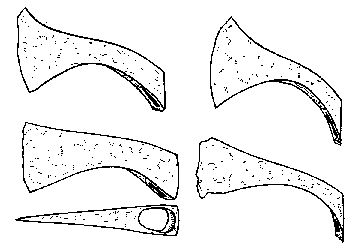
Different types of the Francisca

The francisca is a throwing axe associated with the Franks in the 3rd century CE. Its design was also used by other Germanic peoples of the period including the Anglo-Saxons. The francisca is characterized by its distinctly arch-shaped head, widening toward the cutting edge and terminating in a prominent point at both the upper and lower corners. The top of the head is usually either S-shaped or convex with the lower portion curving inward and forming an elbow with the short wooden haft. Sometimes the head is more up-swept, forming a wider angle with the haft. Most franciscas have a round or teardrop-shaped eye designed to fit the tapered haft, similar to Viking axes. The tomahawk, a similar New World throwing weapon, experienced some influence by the francisca in the French territories. Tomahawk throwing competitions still take place today.

== Hurlbat ==
A hurlbat (or whirlbat, whorlbat) is the term used for a type of weapon with unclear original definition. Older reference works refer to it largely as a type of club, either held in the hand or possibly thrown. Modern usage appears to refer to a type of throwing-axe.

== Nzappa zap ==
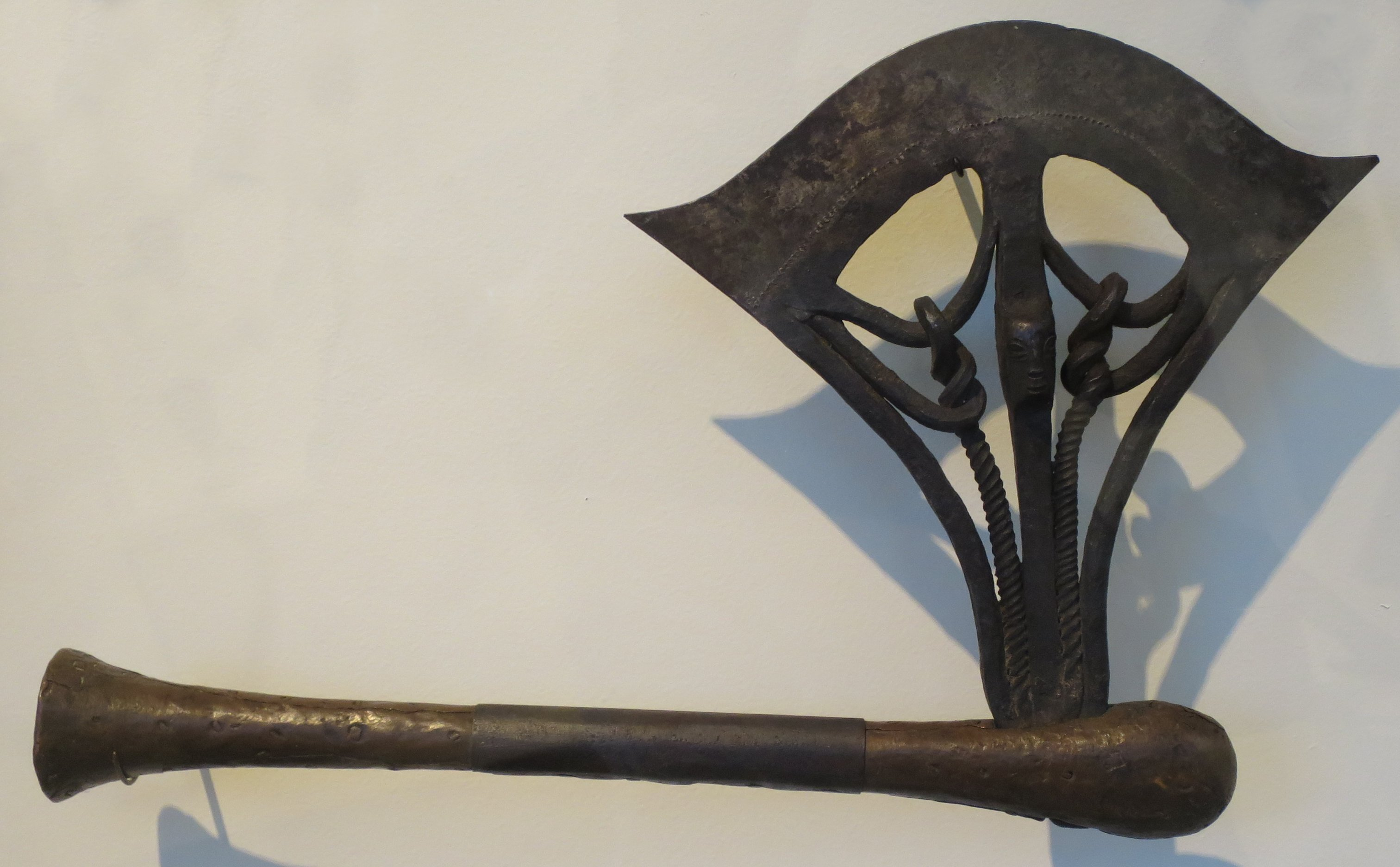
Ceremonial axe, Songe people, Honolulu Museum of Art, 3023

The Nzappa zap is a weapon from the Democratic Republic of the Congo. The Nzappa zaps sometimes had an iron head with two or three human faces. The handle had the shape of a club with a round upper part. The head is attached to the club via struts, giving the weapon its unique design. These axes were either thrown short distances or wielded in hand-to-hand combat.

== See also ==
- Battle axe
- Shuriken
- Throwing knife
