= Forged in Fire =

American television series

- Genre: Reality competition
- Directed by: Alfonso Trinidad; Michael Pearlman
- Presented by: Wil Willis (seasons 1–7); Grady Powell (seasons 8–present)
- Judges: J. Neilson; David Baker; Doug Marcaida; Jason Knight; Ben Abbott
- Composers: Justin Crosby; Kevin Bluhm
- Country of origin: United States
- Original language: English
- No. of seasons: 10
- No. of episodes: 240 (list of episodes)

Production
- Executive producers: Jodi Flynn; Sean Moran; Paul Hogan; Daniel McKenna; Brittany Winsick
- Producers: Mark Montgomery; Sam Rubin; Eric Mathis
- Production locations: Brooklyn, New York; Connecticut
- Cinematography: Jacob Goodwin
- Editors: John Como; Michael Brown
- Running time: 42 minutes
- Production company: Outpost Entertainment

Original release
- Network: History
- Release: June 22, 2015 – present

Related
- Forged in Fire: Knife or Death

Forged in Fire is an American competition series that airs on the History channel and is produced by Outpost Entertainment, a Leftfield Entertainment company.

In each episode, four bladesmiths compete in a three-round elimination contest to forge bladed weapons, with the overall winner receiving $10,000 and the show's championship title "Forged in Fire Champion". The series has a host (formerly Wil Willis for the first seven seasons, currently hosted by Grady Powell) and a three-judge panel consisting of J. Neilson (Jason Knight during portions of season 3 and 4; Ben Abbott during portions of season 4th, 5th, 6th and remaining in the 7th season), David Baker, and Doug Marcaida: experts in weapon making, history and use.

The History channel ordered an initial eight episodes of the series with the first program premiering on Monday, June 22, 2015, at 10pm ET. Season two premiered on February 16, 2016, and increased to 10 episodes. The third season premiered with a "Champion of Champions" match on August 23, 2016, and was announced as having 16 episodes. The fourth season premiered on April 11, 2017, with a "Judges' Pick" episode in which the four judges (Neilson, Knight, Baker, Marcaida) each selected one smith from past seasons to compete again. The fifth season premiered on March 7, 2018. The sixth season premiered on February 6, 2019. The seventh season premiered on October 9, 2019, and expanded into May 6, 2020. The eighth season premiered on November 18, 2020.

== Format ==
The set, referred to as "The Forge," is stocked with a wide range of metalworking equipment, including propane forges, coal forges, grinders, power hammers, and hydraulic presses. Medical personnel are present to treat any injuries or other health problems and may, at their discretion, disqualify smiths who are unable to continue safely. At the end of each round, the smith whose weapon is judged to be the least satisfactory must surrender it and leave the competition.

In a typical episode, the four smiths are presented with a quantity of steel that they must use in the first round to forge a blade in a style of their choosing. In some episodes, they all begin with the same starting material; in others, they may choose from an assortment of metal objects or must salvage their material from a source such as a junked car or lawnmower. The host states one set of criteria concerning blade or blade/tang length, and often a second set for a feature that must be incorporated, such as serrations or a fuller groove. The smiths are given 10 minutes to sketch out their designs, followed by three hours to forge the blades; they need not adhere to their original designs. Once the time expires, the judges evaluate the blades based on the host's criteria and inspect their craft, quality, and design, then deliberate privately before announcing their decision. Any smiths who fail to meet the criteria or who fail to turn in a blade at all are subject to immediate elimination.

For the second round, the three remaining smiths are given an additional two (originally three) hours to turn their blades into fully operational weapons. They must attach a handle, choosing from a range of provided materials, and incorporate any additional special features stated by the host. They must also grind, sharpen, and polish the blades, and may address any flaws or issues pointed out by the judges in the first round, if they choose to do so. After the time expires, the judges put each weapon through a series of tests to gauge properties such as sharpness, durability, and ease of use. For these tests, the weapons are used to chop/slash/stab objects that include ropes, ice blocks, animal bones/carcasses, and metal plumbing pipes. If one weapon suffers a catastrophic failure, defined as damage that renders it unsafe or ineffective for further testing, its maker is immediately disqualified. In the case of catastrophic failure by multiple weapons, the worst performer is eliminated. The judges may, at their discretion, choose not to subject a weapon to a particular test if it is sufficiently cracked or flawed.

In the third round, the two remaining smiths are shown a historically significant (and technically difficult) weapon, mostly prepared by David Baker, and are given four (originally five) days to create a version of it. They return to their home forges to do the work and must comply with any specifications set by the host. Afterward, they return to the Forge and submit their weapons for testing against objects and environments similar to the historical scenarios in which they were typically used. Based on the test results, the judges select one smith to receive the $10,000 prize and the day's championship title.

=== Rule changes ===
Some episodes have incorporated modifications to the rules, as follows:

- Extension or omission of the 10-minute design period in the first round.
- Omission of a required special feature in the first round.
- Not revealing the purpose of the blade in the first round.
- Extension or shortening of the three-hour forging time in the first and/or second rounds, depending on the difficulty level of the blade design and any special features.
- Shortening of the three-hour time to attach a handle in the second round to two hours.
- Requiring the smiths to forge a blade of a specific style in the first round.
- Omission of the requirement to attach a handle in the second round.
- Shortening of the working time from five days to four in the third round.
- Testing of weapon properties after the first round.
- Stopping the clock or keeping it running if a contestant needs medical attention.
- Starting the episode with five smiths who all bring their own blades, then immediately going into an elimination test.
- Starting the episode with three smiths and having no eliminations, with a smaller cash prize awarded to the best smith in each of the first two rounds.

== Personnel ==
=== Hosts ===
- Wil Willis (seasons 1–7) is a former Army Ranger (Third Ranger Battalion) and decorated Air Force para-rescue specialist. Willis' previous television experience includes Special Ops Mission and Triggers, two series that aired on the former Military Channel.
- Grady Powell (season 8–present), a former U.S. Army Green Beret, replaced Wil Willis as the show's host as of the Season Eight premiere on November 18, 2020. Powell's previous television experience includes two seasons starring on Dual Survival on the Discovery Channel, a member of the Cadre on the second season of American Grit, and winning Stars Earn Stripes with former WWE Divas Champion Eve Torres.

=== Judges ===
- J. Neilson, a knife and sword expert, holds the rank of Master Smith within the American Bladesmith Society (ABS). He has over 20 years experience in making knives and edged weapons. He examines technical qualities and durability of each weapon. In Season 3, Neilson took a leave of absence to have surgery on his hand and returned in later episodes of Season 4.
- David Baker, a Hollywood prop maker who has appeared on the Spike TV series Deadliest Warrior, is an authority on weapons history and an expert on replicating period-accurate weapons for both museums and films. He judges the weapons' historical accuracy and aesthetic beauty.
- Doug Marcaida, an edged-weapons specialist, is a U.S. military contractor, martial arts instructor, and knife designer for FOX Knives Italy. Specializing in the Southeast Asian fighting style of Kali, he has taught classes in weapon awareness and use for military, law enforcement, and security organizations. He also designs "the most dangerous knives in the world", owns and sells his own line of knives. Marcaida evaluates the smiths' weapons to determine their effectiveness in combat with his sharpness and kill tests. His catchphrases are to declare of a worthy weapon: "it will cut" or "it will kill". When he is unable to test weapons himself due to injury, Marcaida brings in his brother R.J. or one of his students to perform the task in his place.
- Jason Knight, another ABS Master Smith, filled Neilson's seat on the judges' panel during his medical absence in Season 3. Neilson appeared alongside Knight for the Season 4 premiere; Neilson resumed his seat in the eighth episode.
- Ben Abbott, a nine-time Forged in Fire champion as of February 2022, debuted as a judge starting with the 21st episode of the fourth season. Abbott would replace Neilson in some episodes after Season 5 and replace Baker when Baker participates in the final round in Super Champion Edition (Season 7) and Beat the Judges episodes. In season eight, Ben took on multiple opponents in a five-part "Beat the Unbeaten" series. He remained undefeated and brought his record in the forge to 9–0. Abbott then improved his record to 10-0 on the October 9, 2024 episode of "Beat The Unbeaten". Abbott and his challenger were challenged to re-create the Medieval Sword of Mystery. With the highest winning streak in the show's history of 10-0, Abbott was finally defeated on the Season 10, Episode 17 "Beat the Judges" competition, unseated by returning Season 9 Forged in Fire champion Ira Houseweart.

== Background and production ==
=== Development ===
Tim Healy and Steve Ascher are executive producers for History. Jodi Flynn, Brent Montgomery, David George, Shawn Witt and Simon Thomas are executive producers for Outpost Entertainment. Healy observed the demonstration, and later the filming, from the sidelines. Healy says that the inspiration for Forged in Fire came from his and other developers' love of food competition shows such as Chopped and Iron Chef. However, in order to appeal to the History channel's audience, they decided to have the competition focus on historical weaponry.

=== Casting ===
"[...] I reached out via email. We chatted back and forth for a few weeks. [...] Then I did a phone interview, which led to a video chat interview. They had me forge a certain length blade and document with photos as I did it. I submitted the photos, did a couple more interviews, and then they placed me on a show."

— Dustin Parrella (season 7 contestant), richlandsource.com article

Typically, candidates for Forged in Fire episodes go through a casting call and screening process before appearing and competing on the show. For example, Doug Marcaida shared a casting call to his Facebook page on October 18, 2021, seeking "...metal workers to forge iconic edged weapons from History!". After applying to be on the show, the potential competitors are interviewed by video and phone; asked questions about their metallurgy knowledge, experience, and skills; and undergo background checks. Sometimes, the entrants are asked to build a weapon with particular specifications, with progress pictures being sent to and analyzed by the show's producers before being considered to compete on an episode.

On occasion, former contestants are invited back to the show to participate in another competition. As examples, bladesmiths have reappeared and competed in a military branch tournament, "Second Chance Tournament", or a broken blade "revenge" episode, just to name a few.

=== Filming and set design ===
Forged in Fire episodes are filmed at Brooklyn Fireproof Stages in Brooklyn, New York City, New York, in a safe, professional environment.

The set is composed of a large judge's table from where the judges spectate throughout the episode, a separate worktable for each contestant, large shelving units dubbed the "pantry" for various handle materials, and large quantities of various metal types, grades, sources, and shapes. The rest of the set floor is spotted with other work stations for tools and equipment such as Venturi forges (made and supplied by Majestic Forge), a variety of hammers, steel files, wire brushes, anvils, foot-operated power hammers, hydraulic presses, electric buffer wheels, grinding wheels, vises, welding machines, and other hand and electric tools. Safety equipment is also found throughout the set and is used during construction and testing of weapons.

The winning blades from each episode are showcased on the "Winners Wall" of the filming studio. Some of those blades can be seen on the wall behind the standing contestants during testing portions of various episodes. As the show's sign of respect and gratitude for the participant's effort, time, and labor that went into making each weapon, non-winning blades are returned to the competitors after the respective episode has aired.

== Release ==
=== Series overview ===
Season	Episodes	Originally released		
Season	Episodes	First released	Last released	Network
1	8	June 22, 2015	August 10, 2015	History
2	10	February 16, 2016	April 19, 2016	History
3	16	August 23, 2016	February 14, 2017	History
4	23	April 11, 2017	October 31, 2017	History
5	40	March 7, 2018	December 19, 2018	History
6	30	February 6, 2019	September 25, 2019	History
7	37	October 9, 2019	August 19, 2020	History
8	46	November 18, 2020	February 2, 2022	History
9	26	March 30, 2022	November 2, 2022	History
10	17	October 4, 2023	November 21, 2024	History
11	8	August 6, 2025	September 24, 2025	History
Specials	19	March 28, 2017	June 15, 2022	History

=== Special episodes ===
The "Master & Apprentice" episode in Season 4 featured four master/apprentice pairs of smiths. Only one member of each pair was allowed to work at any time, trading off every 30 minutes in the first two rounds and every day in the third. The non-working member was allowed to offer advice. For this episode, the forging time in the first round was extended to three and a half hours.

The "Ultimate Champions Edition" (Season 4) and "Rookies Edition" (Season 5) each featured five smiths instead of four. The smiths were required to forge a particular type of blade at their homes and bring those weapons to the studio for a preliminary test. One smith was eliminated based on the results of this test, after which the competition proceeded through the normal three rounds.

On October 3, 2018, a five-week Invitational Tournament premiered, consisting of four preliminary heats and a finale. Four smiths with a particular specialty (farrier, armorer, blacksmith, metalworker) competed in each preliminary heat, with the winners advancing to the finale for a $50,000 prize. Dave Parthemore of Connecticut won.

A "Battle of the Branches" tournament began on May 8, 2019, with four smiths from a different branch of the United States armed services (Army, Navy, Air Force, Marines) competing in each preliminary heat.

During the 2019 season, Forged in Fire aired "enhanced" episodes called Forged in Fire: Cutting Deeper, which featured bonus scenes of older episodes with expert tips and techniques from the judges like Dave Baker explaining what happened to each blade during the weapon tests. Each episode was two hours long (made up of 2 older one-hour episodes), highlighting blade themes such as "Revolutionary War Swords" and "Curved Blades", etc.

On May 13, 2020, a special episode titled Forged in Fire: Meet the Judges aired at 8/9c on History. The judges J. Neilson, Dave Baker, and Doug Marcaida, were in the "hot seat" as fans asked them questions about the show, their personal lives, and bladesmithing techniques.

On November 24, 2021, a special episode titled "Bladesgiving" aired at 10 p.m. EST on History. Before the Thanksgiving fest, comes the hunt in which the Forged In Fire team showcased classic hunting weapons. The episode relived five showdowns between championship hunting blades, bows and spears made by some of the forge's bladesmiths.

=== Home media and streaming services ===
Aside from viewing Forged in Fire episodes on History's cable channel and its internet website, there are other subscription options to watch the show. On October 1, 2021, seasons 1, 2, 3, 6, and 7 were added to Discovery+, with season 4 being added to the streaming platform on February 1, 2022. On November 21, 2021, Netflix began airing episodes, albeit one season at a time. There are three seasons (87 episodes) available on Hulu. Episodes from all seasons are available on iTunes, Amazon Prime Video, Google Play, and Vudu on a "Buy/Rent" basis. There is also a Forged in Fire channel on Samsung TV.

== Reception ==
=== Accolades ===
Award Association(s) / Media	Year (Note: Indicates the year of ceremony. Each year is linked to the article about the awards held that year, wherever possible.)	Category	Nominee(s) / Work	Result	Ref(s)
BLADE magazine	2016	Publisher's Award	Forged in Fire	Won	

=== Influence ===
In the city of Cohoes, New York near Albany, a man, inspired by the series, tried to forge a piece of metal over a fire in a barrel near his home. He caused a fire that destroyed three residential buildings and damaged 28 others.

== Series spin-offs ==
Several competition shows have been created as Forged in Fire spin-offs.

=== Knife or Death ===
On April 17, 2018, a spin-off series titled Forged in Fire: Knife or Death premiered on History. This series is hosted by Bill Goldberg and co-hosted by Tu Lam, a martial arts expert and retired member of the Green Berets.

=== Beat the Judges ===
On June 3, 2020, another spin-off series titled Forged in Fire: Beat the Judges premiered on History, hosted by Willis. On each episode, three previous Forged in Fire champions return to compete for an opportunity to face one judge (Neilson, Baker, or Abbott) and win another $10,000. For the first round (level 1), the three smiths each brought one weapon to the Forge in a style of their choosing and created at their home forges, and submit them for testing by Doug Marcaida. The second round (level 2) follows the same format as the third round in a typical Forged in Fire episode. However, the two remaining smiths are given only three days to forge an example of the featured weapon at their home forges. In the third round (level 3), the last remaining smith and the competing judge are given eight hours to create a fully functional example of a particular weapon type in the Forge, including handle fitting and grinding/sharpening/polishing. The other judges then test the weapons and choose the $10,000 winner. The competing judge is announced at the start of the third round; if he wins, the prize is donated to the charity of his choice. J. Neilson (Melanoma Foundation), Dave Baker (Breast Cancer Research), and Ben Abbott (Black Horse Forge: free blacksmithing classes to First Responders and Veterans).

==== Episodes ====
Legend
Color / Symbol	Description
1. name	A contestant's name preceded by the numeral 1 signifies the **winner**.
2. name	A contestant's name preceded by the numeral 2 signifies **2nd place**.
3. name	A contestant's name preceded by the numeral 3 signifies **3rd place**.
4. name	A contestant's name preceded by the numeral 4 signifies **4th place**.
(S## E##)	The "S##" and "E##" (**season and episode numbers**, respectively) in parentheses showcases the contestant's previous appearance(s) on the show (win or lose).
#. **name**	A name in bold denotes a **competing Judge** within a particular episode.

No. in season	Title	Level 1	Level 2	Level 3	Original release date	U.S. viewers (millions)
1	"Short Sword Damascus"	Signature blades (from home forge)	Khanda sword (using scrap metal)	Double-edged Short sword (using large & small pieces of high carbon steel)	June 3, 2020	0.93
Results: 1. **Ben Abbott** (S2 E9 & S3 E1) 2. John Summerhill (S6 E9); Bowie knife 3. Kelly Vermeer Vella (S3 E4 & S4 E21); Recurve fighter knife 4. Ethan Kempf (S5 E7); Bush knife
2	"Medieval Times"	Signature blades (from home forge)	Medieval knight's dagger (using steel from a suit of armor)	Medieval arming sword (using a variety of high-carbon steel)	June 10, 2020	1.00
Results: 1. **Dave Baker** 2. Steven Bryan (S4 E12); Recurve chopper 3. Josh Navarrete (S6 E19); Bowie knife 4. Mark Steele Knapp (S4 E20); Enep Machete
3	"Dual Swords"	Signature blades (from home forge)	Butterfly swords (using only 2 steel ball bearings)	Matched set of Fighting Knives (using 5160 coil springs with the San Mai technique)	June 17, 2020	0.80
Burt Foster is the ABS Master Smith who performed J. Neilson's Master Smith rating test. Results: 1. Burt Foster (S2 E7 & S3 E1); Recurve Camp knife 2. **J. Neilson** 3. John McNerney (S7 E2); Recurve Bowie 4. Jeff Wagenaar (S5 E2); Musso Bowie knife
4	"Smith's Choice"	Signature blades (from home forge)	Short Sword with a D-guard (either using a foundry to cast handle or canister Damascus to make entire blade)	Choice of Spadroon, Ida, or Kora Sword (using layered Damascus steel) (Tobin chooses for himself and Dave: the Ida)	June 24, 2020	0.80
Results: 1. **Dave Baker** 2. Tobin Nieto (S2 E8); Persian Recurve Fighter knife 3. David Goldberg (S1 E4 & S4 E1); Fantasy knife 4. Gene Hodges (S6 E12 & 14); Modified Bowie knife
5	"The No Can Can"	Signature blade (from home forge)	Falcata (using high-carbon steel from old tools)	Short Sword (using saw blades in a make-your-own "no-can" canister Damascus)	July 1, 2020	0.83
Results: 1. **J. Neilson** 2. Tony Fetters (S5 E3); Recurve Drop Point Bowie knife 3. David Roeder (S1 E5 & S3 E2); Recurve Bowie knife 4. Chris Farrell (S1 E2); Recurve Persian Chopper
6	"Rock Star Smiths"	Signature blades (from home forge)	9-Ringed Broadsword	Cinquedea (using high-carbon steel bars in a twist and stack method with a handle from a guitar)	July 8, 2020	0.71
Results: 1. **Ben Abbott** (S2 E9 & S3 E1) 2. Tyler Hackbarth (S6 E10 & 14); Fighter knife 3. Ryu Lim (S1 E3 & S3 E2); Barong 4. Jacob Gayton (S5 E4); Kukri

== Notable contestant achievements ==
Ben Abbott

Ben Abbott entered seasons 2 and 3 as a contestant and won the "Champion of the Forge" title in both. He debuted as a judge in season 4 of Forged in Fire and later participated in the Forged in Fire: Beat the Judges challenge in 2020, winning the title twice more. Abbott then went on to win five more times in the "Beat the Unbeaten" challenge series in season 8 of Forged in Fire.

Ben Abbott's competition record
No.	Result	Record	Opponent(s)	Original air date	Series	S## E##	Episode title	Note(s)
9	Win	9–0	Nicholas Cochiolo	February 2, 2022	Forged in Fire	S8 E45	"Beat the Unbeaten: The Final Showdown"	
8	Win	8–0	Brent Stubblefield	January 26, 2022	Forged in Fire	S8 E44	"Beat the Unbeaten: Back for Revenge"	
7	Win	7–0	Caleb Ledford	January 19, 2022	Forged in Fire	S8 E43	"Beat the Unbeaten: Broken Blade Revenge"	
6	Win	6–0	Rob Loveday	January 12, 2022	Forged in Fire	S8 E42	"Beat the Unbeaten: Scrap Steel Challenge"	
5	Win	5–0	Brandon Franklin	January 12, 2022	Forged in Fire	S8 E41	"Beat the Unbeaten: Round One"	
4	Win	4–0	Tyler Hackbarth	July 8, 2020	Forged in Fire: Beat the Judges	S1 E6	"Rock Star Smiths"	
3	Win	3–0	John Summerhill	June 3, 2020	Forged in Fire: Beat the Judges	S1 E1	"Short Sword Damascus"	Won money for his choice of charity
2	Win	2–0	Matthew Parkinson, Salem Straub, and Burt Foster	August 23, 2016	Forged in Fire	S3 E1	"Champions Edition"	Won $10,000
1	Win	1–0	Tom McGinnis, Brent Stubblefield, and Nathan Zimmerman	April 12, 2016	Forged in Fire	S2 E9	"The Khanda"	Won $10,000

Jesse Hu Jesse Hu won eight times back-to-back in four episodes during the "Gladiators of the Forge" challenge in season 9. In the particular challenge series, contestants were given the choice to continue competing until eliminated. Jesse entered the contest in the third of ten total events, won against Kurt Komyati, chose to continue, and won seven more events thereafter.

Jesse Hu's competition record
No.	Result	Record	Opponent(s)	Original air date	Series	S## E##	Episode title	Note(s)
8	Win	8–0	Kurt Komyati	August 3, 2022	Forged in Fire	S9 E17	"Gladiators of the Forge: The Final Battles"	Won $5,000
7	Win	7–0	Eric Perrault	August 3, 2022	Forged in Fire	S9 E17	"Gladiators of the Forge: The Final Battles"	Won $5,000
6	Win	6–0	Matt Brando	July 27, 2022	Forged in Fire	S9 E16	"Gladiators of the Forge: A Champion's Quest"	Won $5,000
5	Win	5–0	John Lachie	July 27, 2022	Forged in Fire	S9 E16	"Gladiators of the Forge: A Champion's Quest"	Won $15,000
4	Win	4–0	Jason Moscolick	July 20, 2022	Forged in Fire	S9 E15	"Gladiators of the Forge: Vikings vs. Gladiators"	Won $5,000
3	Win	3–0	Eric Perrault	July 20, 2022	Forged in Fire	S9 E15	"Gladiators of the Forge: Vikings vs. Gladiators"	Won $5,000
2	Win	2–0	Ben Banister	July 13, 2022	Forged in Fire	S9 E14	"Gladiators of the Forge: The Battles Continue"	Won $5,000
1	Win	1–0	Kurt Komyati	July 13, 2022	Forged in Fire	S9 E14	"Gladiators of the Forge: The Battles Continue"	Won $5,000

== See also ==
- List of martial arts weapons
- Weapon
