= Corsetti =

Corsetti is an Italian surname. Notable people with the surname include:

- Brian Corsetti, American television personality, and producer
- Giancarlo Corsetti (born 1960), Italian macroeconomist and Professor of Macroeconomics at Cambridge University
- Renato Corsetti (1941–2025), Italian esperantist
