= San Diego Jewish World =

Jewish magazine

- Type: Magazine
- Format: Digital
- Owner(s): Donald and Nancy Harrison
- Founder(s): Donald and Nancy Harrison
- Publisher: Donald H Harrison
- Editor: Donald H Harrison
- Founded: 2007
- Language: English
- Headquarters: San Diego, California
- Website: http://www.sdjewishworld.com

The San Diego Jewish World is a publication that covers Jewish-interest news and cultural affairs in the San Diego, California, area and international Jewish news.

The World was founded in 2007 by Donald and Nancy Harrison and was published by The Harrison Enterprises. It has correspondents throughout the United States, Israel, and in countries with large Jewish populations. The World staff is composed of volunteers many from the former San Diego Jewish Press-Heritage and the San Diego Jewish Times.

Its main competitor is the San Diego Jewish Journal. In November 2021, Jacob Kamaras bought the publication and began to serve as its editor and publisher. On January 1, 2024 Harrison resumed the post of publisher and editor, wanting to make sure Kamaras made a profit, Harrison paid him twice what Kamaras paid for the original transfer.
