= The Last Samurai (disambiguation) =

The Last Samurai is a 2003 film.

The Last Samurai may also refer to:

- The Last Samurai (1974 film)
- Mifune: The Last Samurai, a 2015 documentary
- Oba: The Last Samurai, 2011 drama
- The Last Samurai (novel)
- "The Last Samurai", the first episode of Knife or Death
- Saigō Takamori, dubbed "the last true samurai"
