= Bill Goldberg =

American professional wrestler and football player (born 1966)

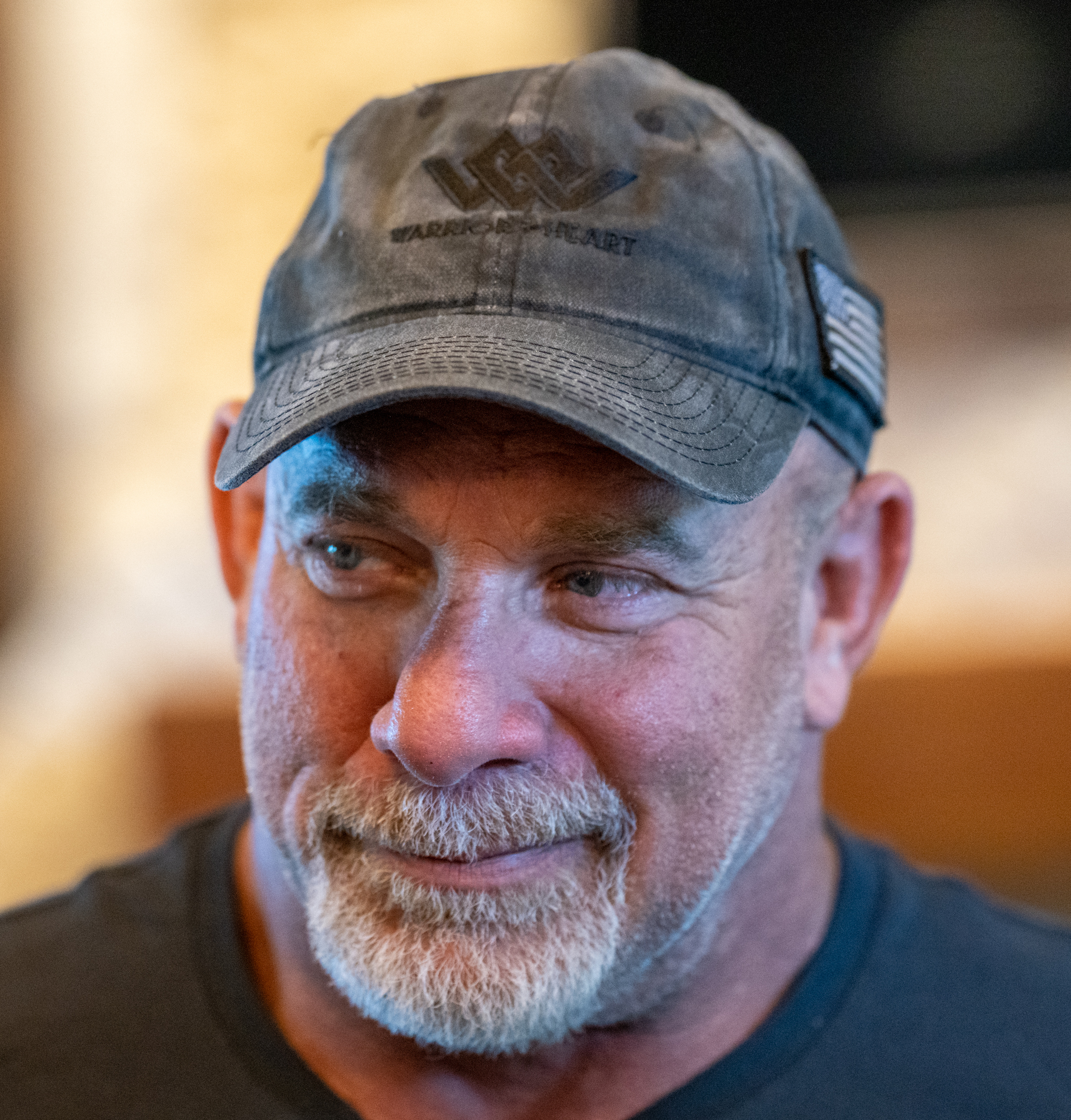
- Goldberg in 2021
- Born: William Scott Goldberg; December 27, 1966 (age 59); Tulsa, Oklahoma, U.S.
- Occupations: professional wrestler; actor; football player
- Years active: 1990–1995 (football); 1997–2004; 2016–2025 (wrestling); 1998–present (acting)
- Spouse: Wanda Ferraton (m. 2005)
- Children: 1
- Professional wrestling career
- Ring name(s): Bill Gold; Bill Goldberg; Goldberg
- Billed height: 6 ft 4 in (1.93 m)
- Billed weight: 285 lb (129 kg)
- Billed from: Atlanta, Georgia; Dawsonville, Georgia; Parts Unknown
- Trained by: DeWayne Bruce; WCW Power Plant
- Debut: June 23, 1997
- Retired: July 12, 2025
- Football career

No. 73, 71
- Position: Defensive tackle

Personal information
- Listed height: 6 ft 2 in (1.88 m)
- Listed weight: 272 lb (123 kg)

Career information
- High school: Edison (Tulsa, Oklahoma)
- College: Georgia (1986–1989)
- NFL draft: 1990: 11th round, 301st overall pick
- Expansion draft: 1995: 36th round, 64th overall pick

Career history
- Los Angeles Rams (1990–1991)*; BC Lions (1991)*; Sacramento Surge (1992); Atlanta Falcons (1992–1994); Carolina Panthers (1995)*
- * Offseason or practice squad member only

Awards and highlights
- World Bowl champion (1992); First-team All-SEC (1989)

Career NFL statistics
- Games played: 14
- Games started: 1
- Total tackles: 11
- Stats at Pro Football Reference

William Scott Goldberg (born December 27, 1966), often known mononymously as Goldberg, is an American retired professional wrestler and football player. As a wrestler, he is best known for his tenures in World Championship Wrestling (WCW) and World Wrestling Entertainment (WWE).

One of the most popular figures of the professional wrestling boom during the late 1990s and early 2000s, Goldberg rose to fame in WCW with a lengthy undefeated streak in singles competition from 1997 to 1998, became the highest paid WCW wrestler, and led the company as its franchise player and public face until it was sold to WWE in 2001. During his time with WCW, he became a one-time WCW World Heavyweight Champion, a two-time WCW United States Heavyweight Champion, and a one-time WCW World Tag Team Champion (with Bret Hart). Along with Hart, he is the fifth WCW Triple Crown winner.

Following WCW's closure in 2001, Goldberg wrestled for All Japan Pro Wrestling between 2002 and 2003 and for WWE between 2003 and 2004, becoming a one-time World Heavyweight Champion (2002–2013 version) in the latter. After 12 years away from wrestling, he returned to WWE in 2016, winning the WWE Universal Championship for the first time in 2017 and a second time in 2020. He has headlined multiple WCW and WWE pay-per-view events, including WCW's premier annual event Starrcade (in 1998 and 1999). He headlined the WWE Hall of Fame in 2018, and is recognized as a four-time world champion in his career between WWE and WCW. He is the only wrestler to win a world championship after being inducted into the WWE Hall of Fame, which happened with his second Universal Championship win. He had his retirement match at Saturday Night's Main Event XL on July 12, 2025, in Atlanta, Georgia, in a losing effort against Gunther for WWE's newer World Heavyweight Championship (introduced in 2023).

Before he became a professional wrestler, Goldberg was a professional American football player. Following his first retirement from wrestling in 2004, he began working as a commentator for the mixed martial arts promotion Elite Xtreme Combat before it closed down. He hosted 26 episodes of Garage Mahal on the DIY Network from 2009 to 2011 and has acted in various films and television shows, including Universal Soldier: The Return and NCIS: Los Angeles.

== Early life ==
William Scott Goldberg was born into a Reform Jewish family in Tulsa, Oklahoma, on December 27, 1966, the son of classical violinist Ethel and obstetrician–gynecologist Jed Goldberg. He is of Russian-Jewish and Romanian-Jewish descent, with his Romanian-born great-grandfather having relocated to the US from Bucharest through Ellis Island. Jed was a graduate of both Harvard University and Johns Hopkins University. His parents later divorced, and his father died in late 2006. His mother breeds flowers and created an award-winning hybrid orchid in 2000, which she named after Goldberg. Bill has two brothers.

Goldberg had his bar mitzvah at a Reform synagogue, Temple Israel, in his hometown. He attended Tulsa Edison High School. He acquired a love for football early in his life.

Due to his large stature, began working as a nightclub bouncer at the age of 16.

Goldberg earned a scholarship to attend the University of Georgia.

== Football career ==
=== College football ===
At University of Georgia, Goldberg played college football for its Georgia Bulldogs as a defensive tackle. He was a four-year letterman (1986–1989) and earned Associated Press first-team All-SEC honors in 1989.

=== Professional football ===
Goldberg was selected by the Los Angeles Rams in the 11th round, with the 301st overall pick, of the 1990 NFL draft. He signed with the Rams on July 11, 1990, but he was released on August 29, 1990, before the start of the regular season. After being a free agent for the 1990 regular season, Goldberg signed with the Rams again on March 18, 1991. However, he was released again on August 19, 1991. He was then signed to the practice roster of the BC Lions of the Canadian Football League on September 11, 1991. On October 19, 1991, he was released by the Lions.

On February 4, 1992, Goldberg was selected by the Sacramento Surge of the World League of American Football (WLAF) in the seventh round, with the 68th overall pick, of the 1992 WLAF draft. He played in all ten games for the Surge during the 1992 WLAF season and recorded three sacks. The Surge finished the season with an 8–2 record and advanced to World Bowl '92, where they defeated the Orlando Thunder by a score of 21–17. Goldberg became a free agent after the 1992 WLAF season and signed with the Atlanta Falcons of the NFL. He was released on August 25, 1992, and signed to the Falcons' practice squad on September 1. He was promoted to the active roster on December 1 and made his NFL debut on December 3, 1992, wearing jersey number #71. Overall, Goldberg played in four games, starting one, for the Falcons during the 1992 season and posted two tackles. He became close with Deion Sanders during this time. Goldberg was released on September 6, 1993, but signed to the practice squad the next day. He was promoted to the active roster again on November 10, 1993, and appeared in five games for the Falcons during the 1993 season, totaling eight tackles. Goldberg played in five games again in 1994 and made one solo tackle. In 1995, he was selected by the new expansion team the Carolina Panthers in the 1995 NFL expansion draft. On April 20, 1995, he was cut by the Panthers, becoming the first player ever released by the team.

Goldberg's football career ended when he "tore his lower abdomen off his pelvis". He explained that he hoped to return to the league after rehabilitation but was not considered a major asset due to his lack of success. The NFL was "a mixed emotional experience" for him, because he did not attain the level of success on the field that he desired, despite reaching the goal of simply playing in the league.

== Professional wrestling career ==
=== World Championship Wrestling (1997–2001) ===
==== Undefeated streak (1997–1998) ====
Following the end of his professional football career, Goldberg began training in powerlifting and mixed martial arts as part of his rehabilitation. During this period, he was approached by WCW performers Lex Luger and Sting, who encouraged him to consider a transition into professional wrestling. Although initially unfamiliar with the industry, Goldberg viewed it as a viable career path and began training at WCW's Power Plant, the company's official developmental facility.

Competing under the ring name Bill Gold, he wrestled in several dark matches during the summer of 1997. He made his in-ring debut on June 23, defeating Buddy Lee Parker in a dark match prior to an episode of Monday Nitro in Macon, Georgia. On July 8, he suffered his only recorded dark match loss, to Chad Fortune, at a WCW Saturday Night taping in Jackson, Tennessee.

Goldberg made his televised debut on the September 22 episode of Monday Nitro, where he defeated Hugh Morrus in what would be the first of a long series of victories. Over the following months, he was booked to win matches in dominant fashion, often defeating opponents in under two minutes. These quick and decisive victories helped build momentum for Goldberg, who was promoted as a powerhouse with exceptional strength and agility. His in-ring persona was characterized by silent intensity, explosive offense, and a distinctive entrance that featured him walking through backstage corridors to the ring.

Goldberg made his first pay-per-view appearance at Halloween Havoc on October 26, assisting Alex Wright in defeating Steve McMichael. The following month, he faced McMichael in his first pay-per-view match at Starrcade on December 28, emerging victorious. Goldberg defeated Brad Armstrong at SuperBrawl VIII on February 22, 1998, and Perry Saturn at Spring Stampede on April 19. Around this time, WCW began officially referring to him solely as “Goldberg”, and began tallying his consecutive victories on television broadcasts.

On the April 20 episode of Nitro, Goldberg defeated Raven to win the WCW United States Heavyweight Championship. Raven had captured the title the night before at Spring Stampede, but was unable to hold off Goldberg despite interference from members of his faction, the Flock. Two days later on Thunder, Goldberg made his first successful title defense against Mike Enos. He later retained the championship against Saturn at Slamboree on May 17, Konnan at The Great American Bash on June 14, and Curt Hennig on subsequent programming. Around this time, he began using the catchphrase “Who’s next?” in reference to his ongoing winning streak.

Goldberg's rise continued throughout the summer, eventually positioning him as a contender for the WCW World Heavyweight Championship held by Hollywood Hogan, the leader of the New World Order (nWo). A title match between the two was announced for the July 6 episode of Nitro, held at the Georgia Dome in Atlanta. Before facing Hogan, Goldberg was required to first defeat Hogan's nWo ally Scott Hall in an impromptu match. Goldberg won both contests, capturing the WCW World Heavyweight Championship in front of over 40,000 fans in his hometown. As a result, he vacated the WCW United States Heavyweight Championship.

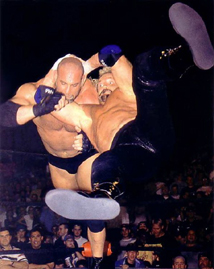
Diamond Dallas Page hits the Diamond Cutter on Goldberg

Following his title win, Goldberg defeated several nWo members in a battle royal at Road Wild on August 8. He retained the WCW World Heavyweight Championship against Diamond Dallas Page at Halloween Havoc on October 25 in a match that was praised by fans and later cited by Goldberg as his personal favorite. His undefeated streak culminated at Starrcade on December 27, where he lost the WCW World Heavyweight Championship to Kevin Nash. The match ended Goldberg's reign at 175 days, and the company promoted the loss as breaking his 173–0 undefeated record. Nash was assisted by Scott Hall, who interfered while disguised as a security guard and used a taser to incapacitate Goldberg. Goldberg would later avenge the loss by defeating Hall in a ladder match involving a taser at Souled Out the following month.

While WCW officially billed Goldberg's streak as 173 consecutive victories, the actual number of matches won during the period was significantly lower. Wrestling media outlets and Goldberg's peers, including Chris Jericho and Jimmy Hart, have noted that the win count was exaggerated for promotional purposes. The inflation of his record was eventually noticed by fans, leading to skepticism and a decline in the storyline's credibility. Homemade signs tracking Goldberg's record became common at events, with some fans removing them after inconsistencies became apparent.

==== Championship pursuits and various feuds (1999–2001) ====
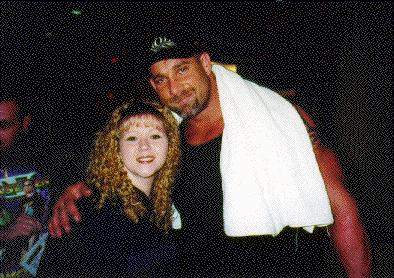
Goldberg posing with a fan in 1998

At Spring Stampede on April 11, 1999, Goldberg defeated Kevin Nash, avenging his first career loss from the previous year. The following month at Slamboree on May 9, he was written off television after an on-screen attack by Rick and Scott Steiner. During this hiatus, Goldberg began filming his role in the action film Universal Soldier: The Return alongside Jean-Claude Van Damme. He returned to in-ring competition at Road Wild on August 14, defeating Rick Steiner.

Goldberg resumed a feud with Diamond Dallas Page and his allies in the Jersey Triad, culminating in a victory over Page at Fall Brawl on September 12. He then turned his attention to Sid Vicious, targeting Vicious's undefeated streak and the WCW United States Heavyweight Championship. The rivalry culminated at Halloween Havoc on October 24, where Goldberg defeated Vicious via referee stoppage to capture the title for a second time.

Later that same night, Goldberg accepted an unsanctioned open challenge from WCW World Heavyweight Champion Sting and won, appearing to become a double champion. However, on the following episode of Nitro, WCW commissioner J.J. Dillon voided the result, ruling the match unofficial. Due to Sting's disqualification during the event, the title was declared vacant, and a 32-man tournament was announced to determine a new champion. Goldberg participated but was eliminated in the first round by Bret Hart, following interference from Sid Vicious and the Outsiders, which also cost him the United States Championship.

Goldberg continued his feud with Vicious, defeating him in an "I quit" match at Mayhem on November 21. Later that month, he teamed with Hart to win the WCW World Tag Team Championship from Creative Control, though they dropped the titles a week later to the Outsiders. At Starrcade on December 19, Goldberg challenged Hart for the WCW World Heavyweight Championship. During the match, Goldberg delivered a kick that legitimately caused Hart a concussion and a neck injury. Despite this, the match continued and ended when special guest referee Roddy Piper awarded the victory to Hart via submission, although Goldberg had not tapped out. Hart vacated the title the following night, offering Goldberg a rematch, which Goldberg again lost following interference from Hall and Nash. Hart subsequently turned on Goldberg and joined Hall, Nash, and Jeff Jarrett to reform the New World Order.

On the December 23 episode of Thunder, Goldberg sustained a serious injury while performing a scripted segment in which he attempted to break the windows of a limousine. During the segment, he punched through a real window with his forearm, severing an artery. He was taken to a hospital for emergency surgery and was sidelined for several months, missing a scheduled appearance at New Japan Pro-Wrestling’s Tokyo Dome event in January 2000.

Goldberg returned to WCW on the May 29, 2000, episode of Nitro, interfering in a handicap match involving Kevin Nash. At The Great American Bash on June 11, he turned heel for the first time in his career by attacking Nash during a WCW World Heavyweight Championship match and aligning with the New Blood faction. The alliance was short-lived due to another injury, after which Goldberg returned as a face once again. He defeated Nash at Bash at the Beach on July 9 with assistance from Scott Steiner and later faced both men in a number one contender’s match at New Blood Rising on August 13. Goldberg walked out midway through the match after refusing to take Nash’s finishing move, an action that was scripted to reflect tensions between Goldberg and WCW head writer Vince Russo. He subsequently feuded with Steiner, culminating in a no-disqualification match loss at Fall Brawl on September 17 following outside interference.

In October, WCW management—represented on-screen by Russo—introduced a storyline ultimatum: Goldberg would be forced to retire if he suffered another loss before matching his previous 173-match undefeated streak. He continued winning matches under this stipulation, including a handicap elimination match against KroniK at Halloween Havoc on October 29 and a feud with Lex Luger. Goldberg defeated Luger at Mayhem on November 26, and again at Starrcade on December 17, although he was attacked post-match by Luger’s associate Buff Bagwell. The two formed a tag team called “Totally Buffed” and continued to feud with Goldberg into early 2001.

At Sin on January 14, 2001, Goldberg teamed with his trainer DeWayne Bruce in a no-disqualification tag team match against Totally Buff. The match ended in defeat after a planted ringside spectator used mace on Goldberg, leading to his first loss since the undefeated streak reset and triggering the retirement clause of the storyline. The loss was intended to write Goldberg off television for shoulder surgery.

In March, WCW was sold to the World Wrestling Federation (WWF). Goldberg, who was still recovering from surgery, did not join the WWF roster. His contract with WCW, held by AOL Time Warner, was not among those acquired by the WWF, as it included a significant financial payout. Goldberg remained under contract until May 2002, when he reached a buyout agreement. At the time of the WCW closure, he was one of the company's highest-paid performers, alongside Bret Hart, earning $2.5 million annually with a clause that would have increased his salary to $3.5 million in the contract's final year.

=== All Japan Pro Wrestling (2002–2003) ===
Goldberg had suffered an arm injury during the Toyota Pro/Celebrity Race at the Long Beach Grand Prix in April 2002. In August 2002, he returned to the ring in Japan. He initially joined All Japan Pro Wrestling (AJPW), defeating Satoshi Kojima and Taiyō Kea. He went on to defeat Rick Steiner in a match for the W-1 promotion and teamed with Keiji Mutoh to defeat KroniK. His success in Japan led to the WWF – renamed World Wrestling Entertainment – to begin contract negotiations with him.

=== World Wrestling Entertainment (2003–2004) ===
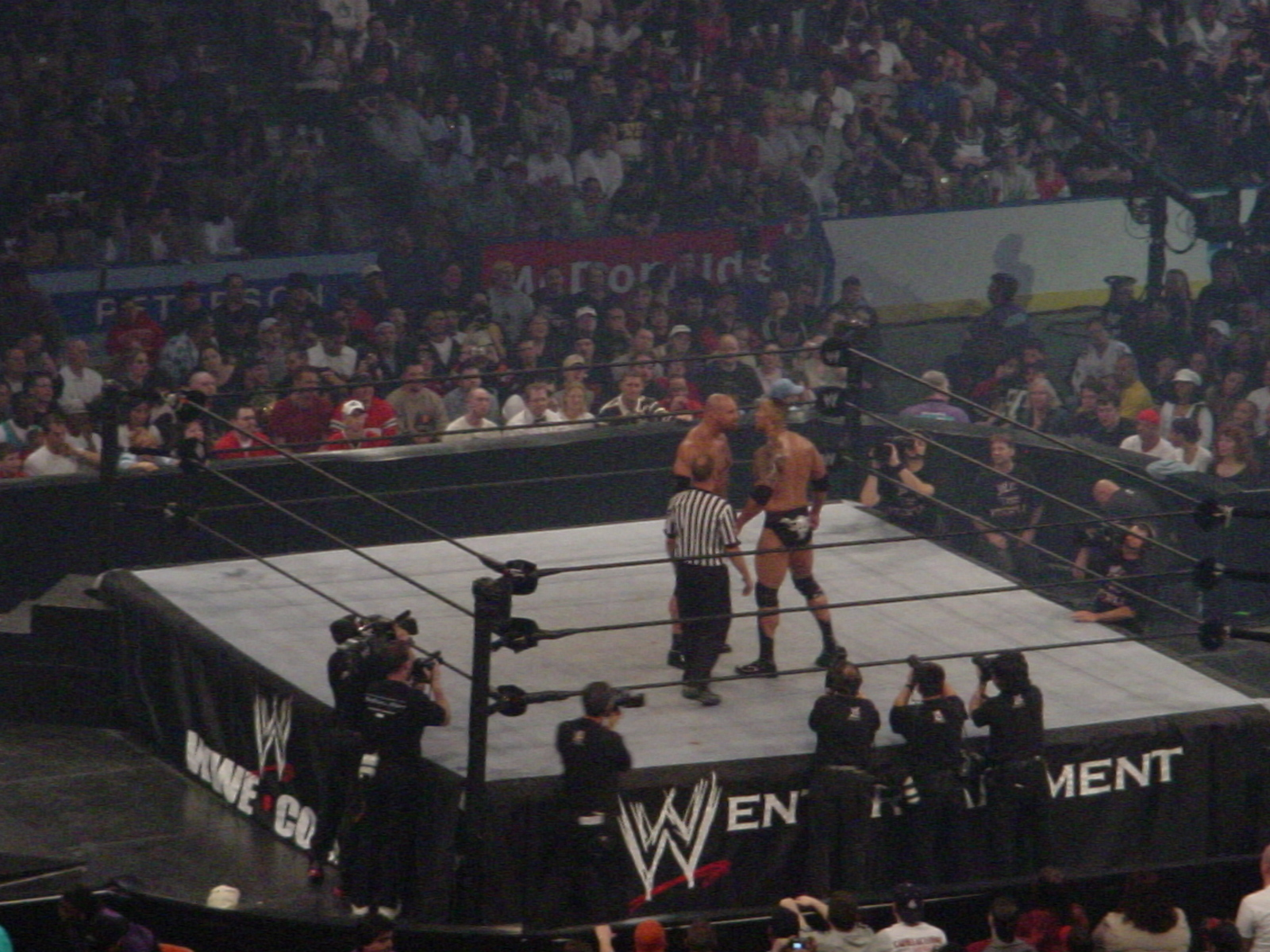
Goldberg and the Rock face off at Backlash in 2003

After leaving Japan, Goldberg signed a one-year contract with World Wrestling Entertainment (WWE) in March 2003. A promo video announcing his arrival aired during WrestleMania XIX. He debuted the next night on the March 31 episode of Raw and started a feud with The Rock by performing a spear on him. Their rivalry intensified when The Rock held a segment entitled The Rock Concert, where he taunted Goldberg along with Gillberg, but Goldberg defeated The Rock in his debut match at Backlash on April 27, following three spears and a Jackhammer. Goldberg went undefeated over the subsequent half-year, defeating 3-Minute Warning in his first match on Raw on May 5. Goldberg defeated Christian the following week on Raw in a steel cage match. Goldberg next began a feud with Chris Jericho, culminating in a match between the two at Bad Blood on June 15, which Goldberg won.

In August 2003, Goldberg began a rivalry with Triple H over the World Heavyweight Championship. At SummerSlam on August 24, he participated in the Elimination Chamber match, eliminating Randy Orton, Shawn Michaels, and Chris Jericho before being pinned by Triple H, who used a sledgehammer provided by Ric Flair to retain the title. The feud continued, leading to a Title vs. Career match at Unforgiven on September 21, where Goldberg defeated Triple H to win the championship. Following his title win, Triple H offered a $100,000 bounty to anyone who could sideline Goldberg. Several wrestlers attempted to collect, but it was Batista, Triple H's Evolution stablemate, who succeeded on the October 20 episode of Raw by attacking Goldberg during a title defense against Shawn Michaels, injuring his ankle in kayfabe. Despite the injury and interference from Evolution members, Goldberg retained the championship against Triple H at Survivor Series on November 16. The rivalry culminated in a triple threat match at Armageddon on December 14, where Goldberg lost the championship to Triple H also involving Kane after interference from Evolution, ending his reign at 84 days.

In early 2004, Goldberg entered a feud with Brock Lesnar. At the Royal Rumble event on January 25, Lesnar interfered in the Royal Rumble match, leading to Goldberg's elimination by Kurt Angle. Goldberg would then interfere in Lesnar's WWE Championship defense against Eddie Guerrero at No Way Out on February 15, costing him the title. This led to a match between Goldberg and Lesnar at WrestleMania XX on March 14, with "Stone Cold" Steve Austin as the special guest referee. The weeks leading up to 'Mania, rumors began circulating on the Internet that Lesnar would be leaving WWE to pursue a career in the NFL. The week before the event, it was rumored that Goldberg would be leaving WWE as well. Goldberg won the match, after which both he and Lesnar subsequently received Stone Cold Stunners from Austin.

=== HUSTLE (2004) ===
On January 4, 2004, Goldberg wrestled a single match for the Japanese Hustle promotion in the main event of its inaugural pay-per-view, HUSTLE 1, facing Naoya Ogawa in the Saitama Super Arena. Goldberg won the match by pinfall after Giant Silva interfered, attacking Ogawa.

=== Legends of Wrestling (2015–2016) ===
Goldberg made his return to professional wrestling on June 7, 2015, at the Legends of Wrestling show at Citi Field in New York. While he was not scheduled to wrestle at the event, Goldberg came to the aid of Rob Van Dam after his match with Scott Steiner. He performed a spear on Steiner and a Jackhammer on Doc Gallows. On January 23, 2016, Goldberg made a second return for the Legends of Wrestling event in Miami, where he delivered another spear to Steiner after his match with Chavo Guerrero.

=== Return to WWE (2016–2025) ===
==== Universal Champion and Hall of Fame (2016–2020) ====
On May 31, 2016, Goldberg was announced as the pre-order bonus for the upcoming WWE 2K17 video game. Throughout the summer, Goldberg and WWE 2K17 cover star and former rival Brock Lesnar traded insults with each other through social media and WWE 2K events such as Gamescom. Goldberg would also appear at the WWE 2K SummerSlam event the weekend before the pay-per-view event took place, fueling speculation he would be appearing at the event to confront Lesnar. This led to Paul Heyman challenging Goldberg to face Lesnar on the October 10 episode of Raw, with Heyman stating that Goldberg was the one blemish on Lesnar's WWE career, as Goldberg had defeated Lesnar at WrestleMania XX in 2004. The following week on the October 17 episode of Raw, Goldberg returned to WWE for the first time in over 12 years, and accepting Heyman's challenge. The match took place at Survivor Series, where Goldberg defeated Lesnar in 1 minute and 26 seconds giving Lesnar his first pinfall loss since April 2013. Months later, Goldberg would participate in the Royal Rumble match on January 29, 2017, where he entered at number 28 and eliminated Lesnar following a brief confrontation and a spear, as well as eliminating Rusev and Luke Harper before being eliminated by The Undertaker.

Lesnar then appeared on the following night's episode of Raw and challenged Goldberg to one final match at WrestleMania 33. Goldberg would go on to accept Lesnar's challenge on the February 6 episode of Raw and, on the same episode, also earned a match against Kevin Owens for the WWE Universal Championship. At Fastlane, Goldberg would defeat Owens for the Universal Championship. This led to a match against Lesnar at WrestleMania where Goldberg put his title on the line. At WrestleMania, Goldberg lost the title to Lesnar in what was also his first clean singles loss in his entire career. Goldberg appeared the following night on Raw Talk (which aired on the WWE Network after the Raw broadcast) to wish the fans farewell, but ultimately did not rule out a return in the future.

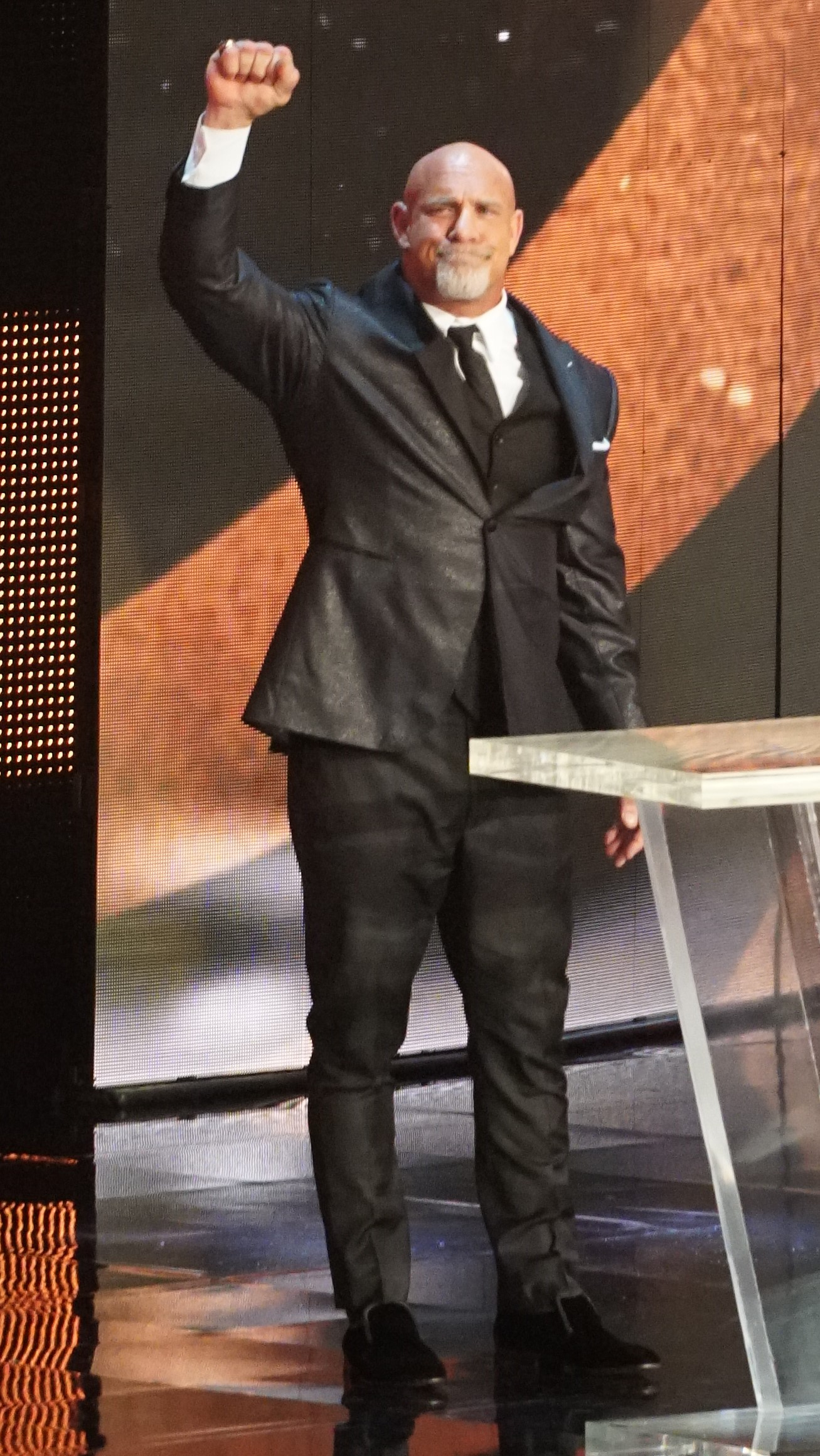
Goldberg being inducted into the WWE Hall of Fame in April 2018

On January 15, 2018, ESPN announced that Goldberg would be inducted into the WWE Hall of Fame. This was then confirmed on Raw when it was announced by WWE. On March 25, Paul Heyman was announced to induct Goldberg into the Hall of Fame; the event occurred on April 6. Despite his Hall of Fame induction, Goldberg continued to wrestle for WWE. His next match was against The Undertaker at the Super ShowDown event on June 7, 2019. During the match, Goldberg suffered a concussion a few minutes into the match, which severely affected his performance, botching several moves, including the failed Jackhammer on The Undertaker, until The Undertaker finally won the match. His next match was at SummerSlam, where he defeated Dolph Ziggler.

After six months of inactivity, Goldberg returned to WWE on the February 7, 2020 episode of SmackDown, when he appeared via satellite and challenged "The Fiend" Bray Wyatt to a match for the Universal Championship, which Wyatt accepted, setting up a match between the two for Super ShowDown. At Super ShowDown on February 27, Goldberg defeated The Fiend to win the Universal Championship for the second time, becoming the first wrestler to win a world championship after being inducted into the WWE Hall of Fame. During the following weeks, WWE scheduled a match between Goldberg and Roman Reigns at WrestleMania 36 for the Universal Championship, but after Reigns opted to pull out amid concerns surrounding the COVID-19 pandemic, Goldberg's opponent was changed to Braun Strowman. At WrestleMania, Goldberg lost the Universal Championship to Strowman.

==== Final feuds and retirement (2021–2025) ====
After a nine-month hiatus, Goldberg faced Drew McIntyre for the WWE Championship at the Royal Rumble on January 31, 2021, but was unsuccessful in winning the title. Goldberg returned on the July 19 episode of Raw, its first episode in front of a live audience in over a year, to confront WWE Champion Bobby Lashley, teasing a potential match between the two. On the August 2 episode of Raw, Lashley would accept Goldberg's challenge, making their match at SummerSlam for the WWE Championship, official. At SummerSlam on August 23, Goldberg lost due to not being able to continue after incurring a knee injury. When Lashley continued to attack him after the end of the match, Goldberg's son Gage intervened but ended up being attacked himself. On the October 4 episode of Raw, Goldberg would call out Lashley and in response, Lashley would challenge Goldberg to a no holds barred match at Crown Jewel. At Crown Jewel, Goldberg defeated Lashley to end their feud. On the February 4, 2022, episode of SmackDown, Goldberg would make his return to challenge Universal Champion Roman Reigns to a match at Elimination Chamber, a match that had originally been planned for WrestleMania 36 two years prior. At Elimination Chamber, Goldberg lost to Reigns via technical submission.

On October 5, 2024, at Bad Blood, Goldberg and Gage were in the audience. When World Heavyweight Champion Gunther came out and insulted him and Gage, Goldberg tried to attack him, but was held back by security guards. During the podcast at SEC Network, Goldberg announced that he would be returning to WWE for his retirement match at some point in 2025. On the June 16, 2025 episode of Raw, Goldberg returned and confronted Gunther over the incident at Bad Blood, subsequently challenging him to a match for the World Heavyweight Championship on July 12 at Saturday Night's Main Event XL in Atlanta, which was later made official. At the event with his son Gage at ringside, Goldberg was defeated by Gunther in his retirement match, ending his 28-year career.

== Legacy, parodies, and reception ==
"Stone Cold" Steve Austin described Goldberg as one of the strongest wrestlers in history. Notably, Mark Henry—who himself is regarded as one of the world's strongest men—also described Goldberg as one of the strongest people in wrestling. WWE describes Goldberg as "one of the most dominant Superstars to ever set foot inside the squared circle". WWE Hall of Famer and industry veteran Arn Anderson likened Goldberg's popularity at his late 1990s peak to that of Hulk Hogan, The Rock, and Austin, saying that he "was as hot as anybody has ever been in the history of this business". Diamond Dallas Page and Bobby Lashley also claimed that Goldberg was the most popular wrestler in the world at one point in time. Kevin Owens has said that Goldberg was the "figurehead" and "poster boy" of WCW, while Sports Illustrated noted that he "reached the highest point of popularity in pro wrestling". He has been named as the favorite wrestler of figures such as Big E, Randy Orton, Madcap Moss, and Bron Breakker.

Due to his extremely masculine wrestling character, Goldberg has been credited with battling Jewish stereotypes, especially the "nice Jewish boy" stereotype which sees Jewish men portrayed as weak and effeminate. In 1999, Jewish News of Northern California stated that he had "turned the notion of Jew as victim on its head". He told the publication, "I wanted to give the Jewish public someone to hold onto, someone as a positive role model that didn't go out and cuss, didn't go out and cheat, someone to look up to." In a 2005 interview with the San Diego Jewish Journal, he said, "It's been a blessing to be a role model for those Jewish kids who never had a Jewish sports hero to look up to, especially those who were too young to remember Koufax or aren't into baseball and don't follow the career of Shawn Green. [...] [Being Jewish] doesn't mean I have to read the Torah every day, but hell, I wrestled in front of millions of people and called myself by my real name. That's a testament to myself that I'm proud of."

Goldberg's rapid rise to popularity in WCW led the WWF to parody him during the Attitude Era with longtime jobber Duane Gill being repackaged as Gillberg. Goldberg was initially unhappy with the parody but later embraced the character and was happy that Gill was able to have a more substantial run during his career. The two would eventually confront each other on Raw in 2003, in which Goldberg quickly dispatched Gillberg.

Trying to replicate WCW's success with Goldberg, WWE began pushing Ryback in 2012 in a similar manner to Goldberg, leading to the portmanteau of "Ryberg" to be devised by fans and commentators for Ryback. In October 2012, after Ryback used Goldberg's Jackhammer move during a match against Kofi Kingston, Goldberg tweeted, "NOW comparisons offend me." Spectators at WWE events had been chanting "Goldberg" during Ryback's matches from 2012, which Ryback said "never bothered [him] because fans were very loyal to Goldberg as Goldberg was the top star at WCW and also had a good run in WWE". In response to Chael Sonnen's confusion about Ryback's appeal in late 2014, former WWE writer Jon Piermarini noted on an episode of Sonnen's podcast that the creative staff were doing "essentially the exact same thing they did with the character when it did not work or catch on the first time" and would only continue to get Goldberg's character over as Ryback. Goldberg would return to WWE around the same time Ryback asked for and was granted his release from the company in 2016.

Many promotions would parody Goldberg's infamous streak, including WWE on multiple occasions, albeit with a losing streak such as with the aforementioned Gillberg as well as Curt Hawkins. In 2014, Ring of Honor started a gimmick for R. D. Evans, where he began gloating about his win streak, which he dubbed the "New Streak", although all of his wins came over jobbers or by disqualification over serious wrestlers like Michael Elgin and Roderick Strong. His streak eventually ended later that year.

Bret Hart has been highly critical of Goldberg's work and said, "His wrestling, his work rate, was 0 out of 10." Goldberg's later career run has also been criticized; former WCW executive Eric Bischoff stated it is due to his lack of in-ring talent, although Bischoff further said that he viewed only Goldberg and The Rock as legitimate box office draws in 2020. WWE wrestler Riddle has been critical of Goldberg's Universal Championship run and accused him of steroid use. However, he later said that he "would love to work with Goldberg," and that he thought it would be "great for business." In response to fans complaining about Goldberg being put over younger talent, Goldberg responded, "They can complain all they want. I was brought in for a reason. I'm a relief pitcher." He reiterated that he is just a performer and does not book the matches.

== Other media ==
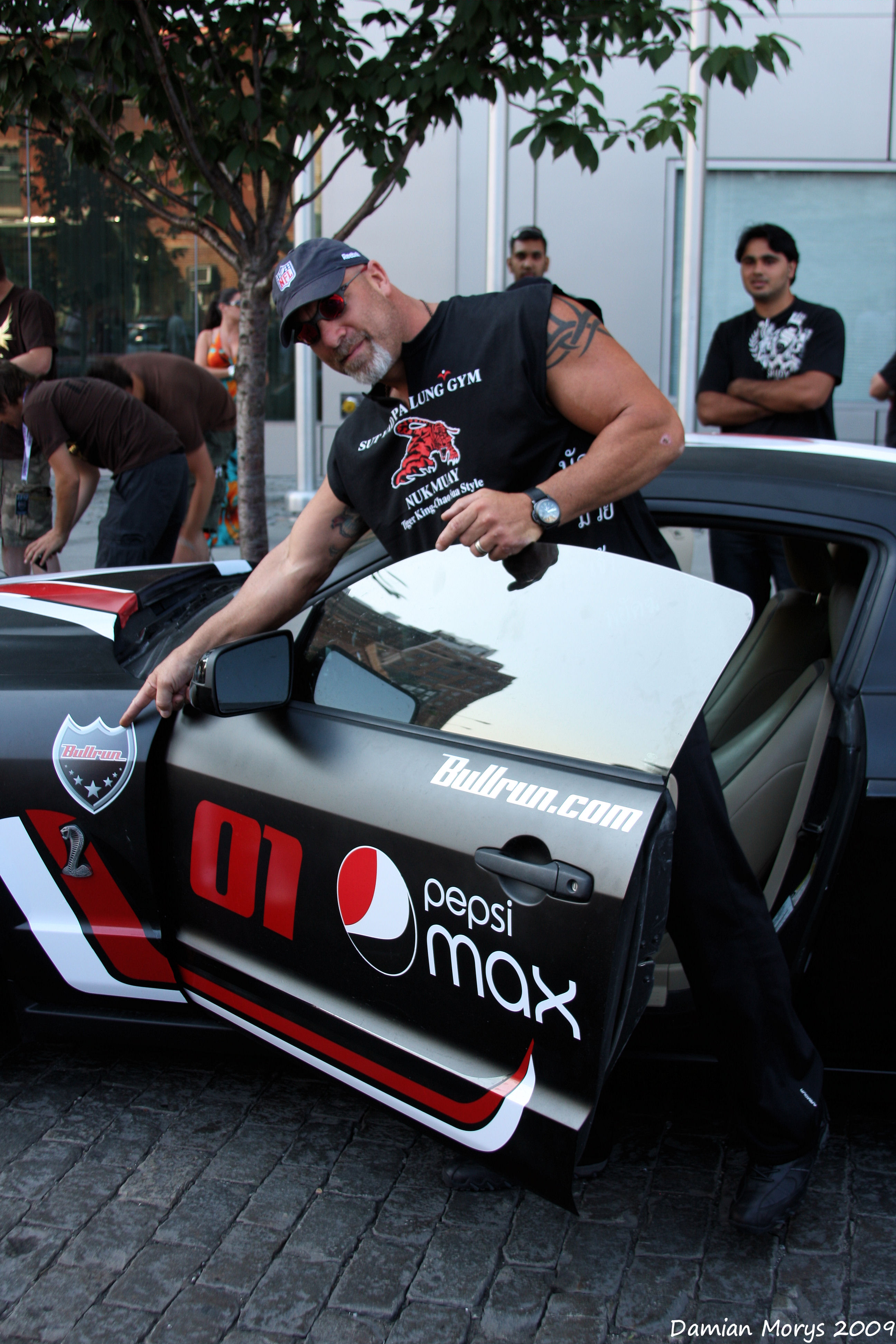
Goldberg in 2009

=== Film and television ===
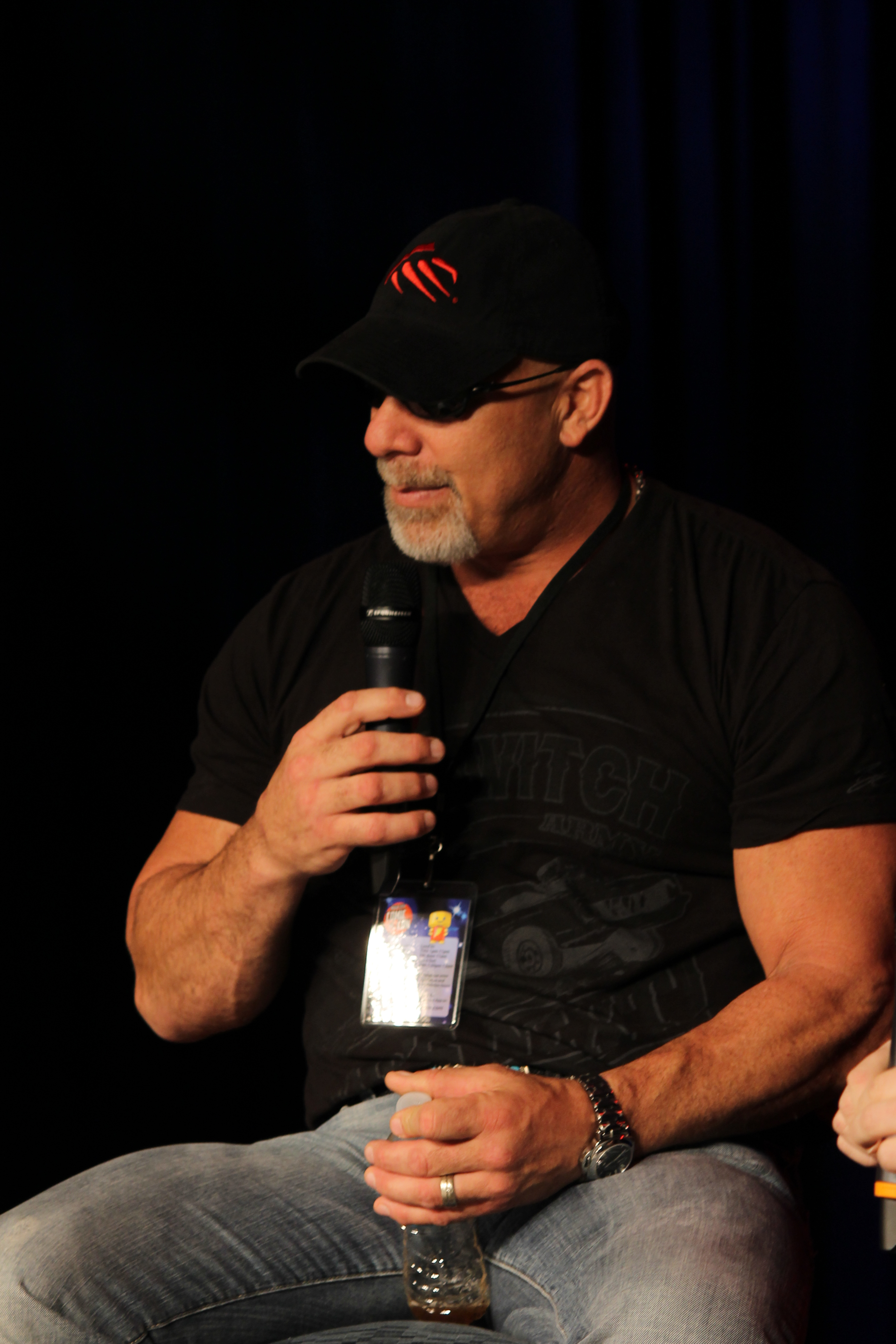
Goldberg at the 2015 Magic City Comic Con

Goldberg began acting while working for WCW in 1999. His appearance in Universal Soldier: The Return corresponded with him being featured in the music video. He was a special guest star on Hulk Hogan's Celebrity Championship Wrestling. On the show he showed the contestants his various power moves and also how to hit an opponent with a steel chair. He went on to host three seasons of the Speed Channel show Bullrun.

In 2005, Goldberg also starred in the Happy Madison produced Adam Sandler movie The Longest Yard, as an inmate, along with fellow wrestlers Kevin Nash, The Great Khali and Stone Cold Steve Austin, as well as actors Chris Rock and Burt Reynolds among others. In the same year he was also the host of The History Channel documentary series Auto-Maniac and later starred in the movie Santa's Slay where he plays a homicidal Santa Claus who goes on a killing spree on Christmas. In 2007, Goldberg starred in the thriller/drama film Half Past Dead 2 alongside rapper Kurupt.

In March 2010, Goldberg appeared on the ninth season of Donald Trump's reality series The Celebrity Apprentice and was eliminated in the sixth episode. In 2016, Goldberg starred in the documentary film Nine Legends alongside other notable wrestlers, former boxing star Mike Tyson and UFC fighter Randy Couture.

In 2017, Goldberg made his first appearance in the fifth season of The Goldbergs as Coach Nick Mellor, the brother of recurring character Coach Rick Mellor. The show is based on childhood memories of Adam F. Goldberg but the two Goldbergs are of no relation.

In 2018, Goldberg started hosting a knife-based reality show called Forged in Fire: Knife or Death on the History Channel. He appeared in Season 10 Episode 7 ("One of Us") of NCIS: Los Angeles as Special Agent Lance Hamilton.

He also starred in the film American Satan (2017) as the tour manager/bodyguard for a heavy metal band called The Relentless.

On July 17, 2022, Goldberg was the subject of the Biography: WWE Legends.

=== Video games ===
Goldberg is a playable character in numerous video games, including WCW Nitro, WCW/nWo Revenge, WCW/nWo Thunder, WCW Mayhem, WCW Backstage Assault, WWE WrestleMania XIX, WWE Raw 2, WWE SuperCard, WWE Champions, Fire Pro Wrestling, WWE SmackDown! Here Comes the Pain, WWE 2K14, WWE 2K17 (for which he was the pre-order bonus), WWE 2K18, WWE 2K19. WWE 2K20, WWE 2K Battlegrounds, WWE 2K22, WWE 2K23, WWE 2K24, WWE 2K25, and WWE 2K26.

=== Mixed martial arts color commentary ===
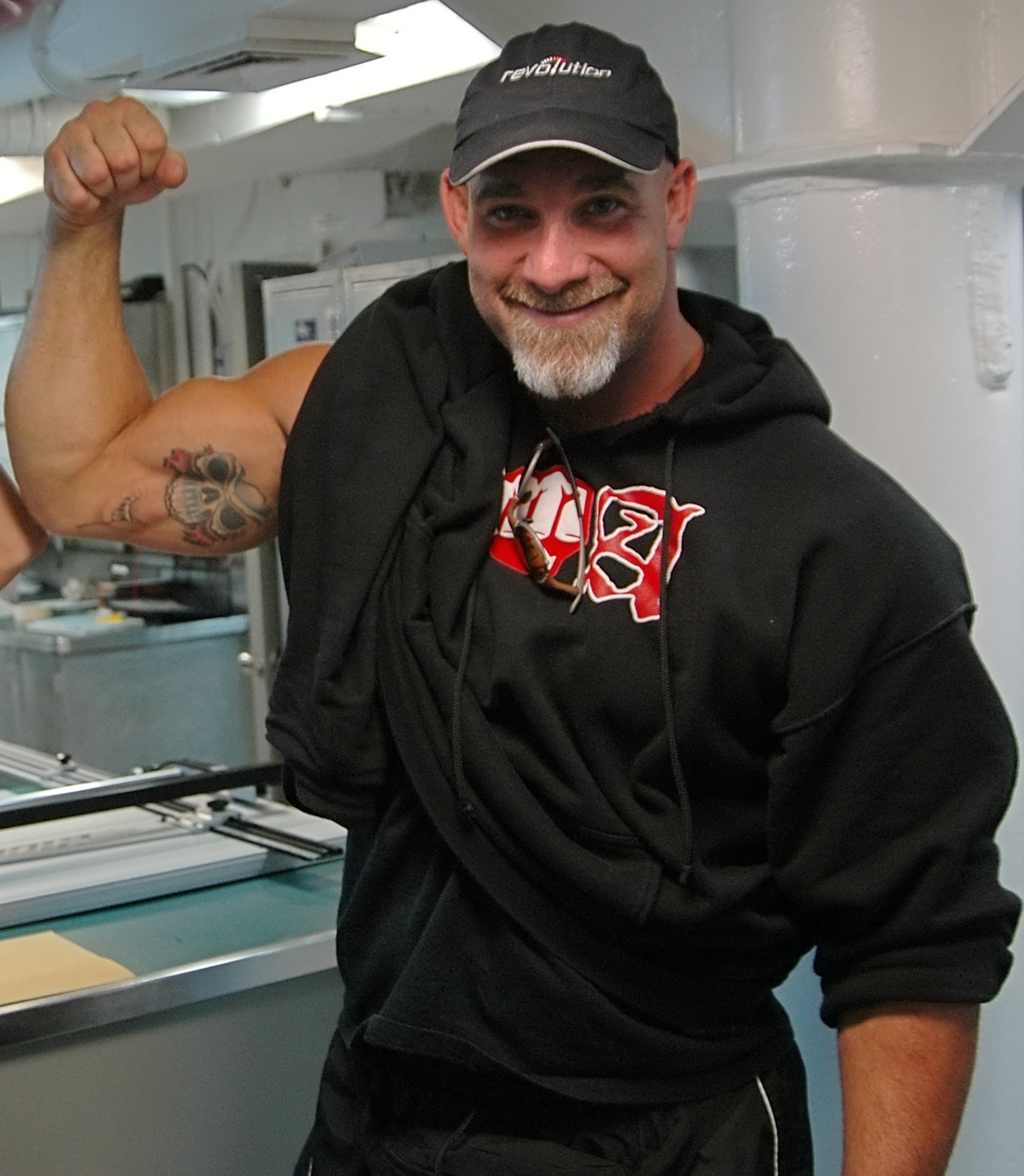
Goldberg in 2005

In August 2002, during his professional wrestling tenure in Japan, Goldberg served as color commentator in mixed martial arts (MMA) promotion Pride Fighting Championship. He also participated in MMA training sessions, though without intention to compete himself. Around this time, Goldberg was challenged by Bob Sapp to either a professional wrestling match or a mixed martial arts fight, but nothing came from it. On July 22, 2006, Goldberg served again as color commentator, this time in World Fighting Alliance (WFA) King of the Streets's pay-per-view in Los Angeles, California. When asked whether he was interested in becoming a mixed martial artist, Goldberg stated, "I'd love to, especially if I was 21 or even 29, but these guys are so far ahead of me in terms of experience. I never say never, though. But I don't see myself stopping my movies, my shows, my commentating, or being a dad to do that". On June 2, 2007, Goldberg also commentated on K-1 Dynamite USA.

Goldberg became a color commentator for the EliteXC organization during their inaugural event. The event, EliteXC Destiny, was broadcast live on Showtime, on February 10, 2007. He continued in this role through all of EliteXC's showcase and combined cards, including Dynamite!! USA, Strikeforce Shamrock vs. Baroni, EliteXC: Renegade and EliteXC: Street Certified, until the organization was defunct in 2008.

=== Other ===
Goldberg co-owns the Extreme Power Gym Muay Thai and amateur boxing training facility in Oceanside, California. He also owns over 25 vintage cars, including a Plymouth Barracuda, AC Cobra, and Boss 429 Mustang.

Goldberg owned one of the biggest MMA gyms in the world during the early 90s where he trained MMA with the likes of Mark Coleman, Randy Couture, Kevin Randleman, and Don Frye, among others, but after realizing how much money they made in MMA, he chose to follow a pro-wrestling career. He still actively practices Muay Thai and holds the rank of black belt in jiu-jitsu.

Goldberg sponsored the Monster Jam truck Goldberg, which was driven by Tom Meents from 2000 to 2001 as part of a deal between WCW and FELD Motorsports. The truck was very successful, winning the Monster Jam World Finals Racing championship in both 2000 and 2001 and the Freestyle championship in 2001. The partnership ended after WCW was bought by WWE, and the truck was renamed Team Meents which later became Maximum Destruction.

In November 2000, Goldberg and his brother Steve co-authored Goldberg's autobiography I'm Next: The Strange Journey of America's Most Unlikely Superhero.

In 2014, Goldberg started his own podcast, Who's Next?! With Bill Goldberg, which includes weekly guest interviews. Since 2022, Goldberg has appeared multiple times on the "UnsubscribePodcast".

== Charity work ==
In January 2016, Goldberg and entertainment impresario Uncle Louie started a joint venture with disabled Air Force veteran Reinaldo Horday called Combat Crate, which offers a crate of exclusive memorabilia with 100% of the profits from its inaugural crate going to the Wounded Warriors' South Florida branch.

A long-time animal welfare advocate and an American Society for the Prevention of Cruelty to Animals (ASPCA) spokesman, Goldberg addressed Congress in 1999 to raise awareness of illegal animal fighting.

Goldberg regularly participated in the now-defunct Jimmy V Golf Classic, a golf tournament with the profits going towards cancer research, and often visits children in hospitals who are undergoing cancer treatment.

== Personal life ==
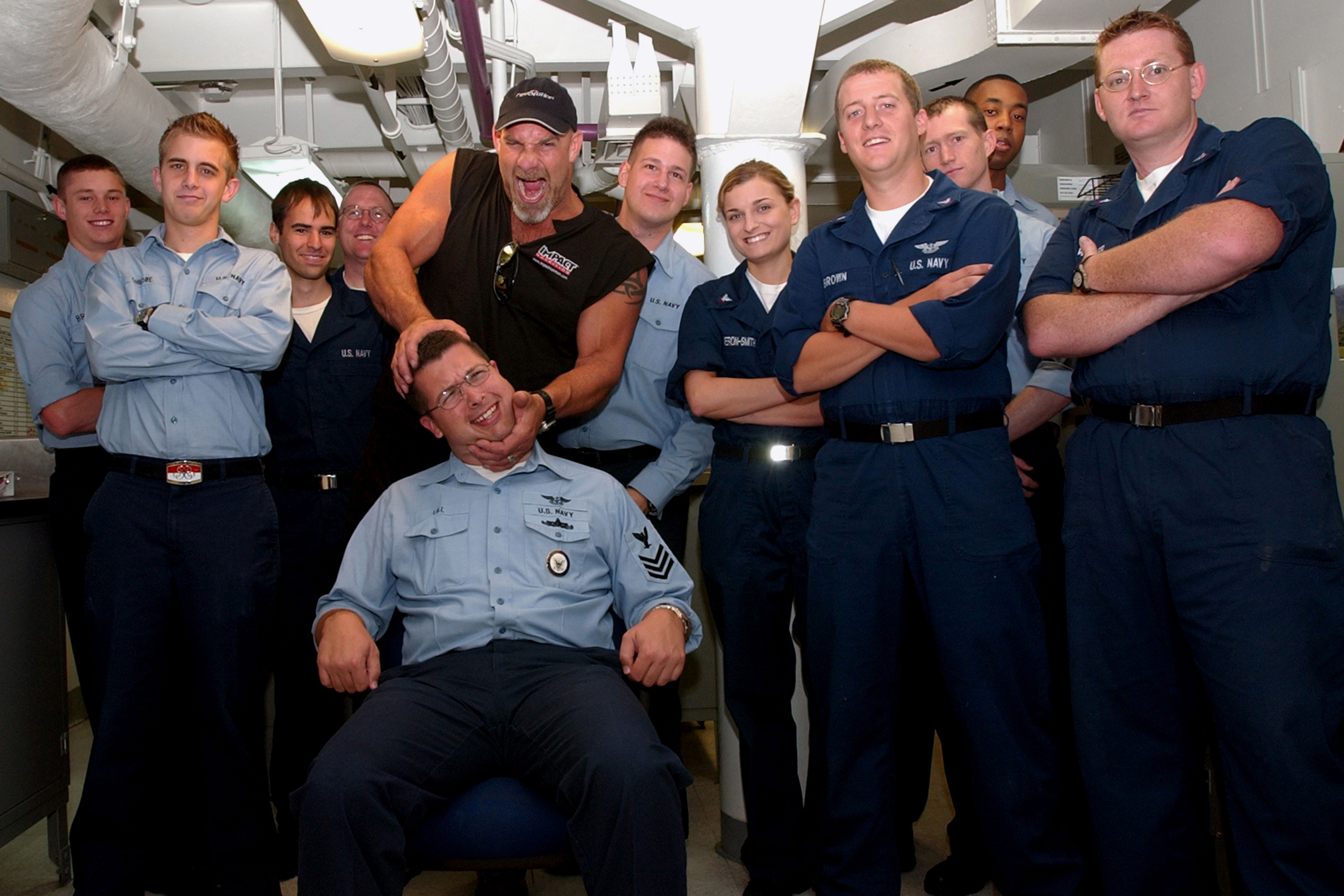
Goldberg during his tour of the USS Ronald Reagan in May 2005

Goldberg has been noted for being open about his Jewish background, which was uncommon in the professional wrestling world, especially during his prime. He famously refused to wrestle on Yom Kippur. He celebrates the Jewish holidays but has downplayed the religious aspects of his Jewish background, admitting in 2005 that he is "so far from religious it's not even funny". Despite this, he added, "I guarantee when my girlfriend and I get married, I'll have a rabbi marry us and I'll be breaking the glass right next to her."

On April 10, 2005, Goldberg married Wanda Ferraton, a stunt double he had met while filming Santa's Slay. From 2001 to 2019, they resided in Bonsall, California, then moved to Boerne, Texas. Their son Gage was born in 2006. He was a redshirted freshman linebacker for the Colorado Buffaloes. Gage expressed interest in a professional wrestling career if he is unable to become a professional football player.

Goldberg has a long scar on the right side of his torso from a tear suffered during a college football game that had required surgery to repair. He also acquired a scar on his right forearm from an altercation in WCW, which kept him out of action for an extended amount of time due to the surgery needed to fix it. He has a large tribal tattoo on his left shoulder, which became his professional wrestling logo, and a skull tattoo on the inside of his right biceps.

== Luchas de Apuestas record ==
Winner (wager)	Loser (wager)	Location	Event	Date	Notes
Gunther (title)	Goldberg (career)	Atlanta, Georgia	Saturday Night's Main Event XL	July 12, 2025	

== Filmography ==
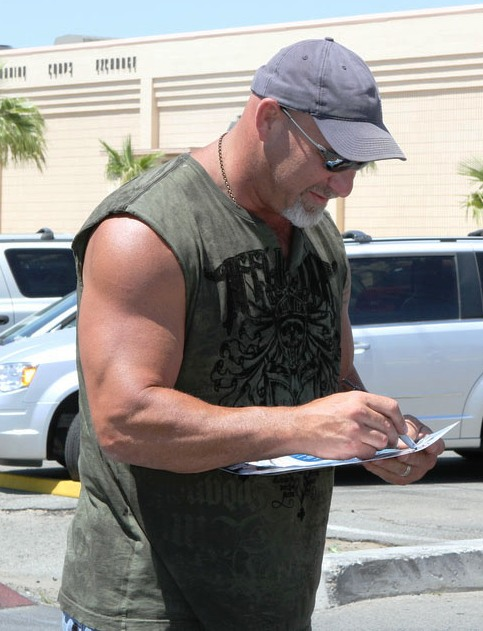
Goldberg signing autographs in 2010

Film
Year	Title	Role	Notes
1999	The Jesse Ventura Story	Luger	Film debut
1999	Universal Soldier: The Return	Romeo	
2000	Ready to Rumble	Himself	
2003	Looney Tunes: Back in Action	Mr. Smith	
2005	The Longest Yard	Joey "Battle" Battaglio	
2005	The Kid & I	Himself	
2005	Santa's Slay	Santa Claus	
2007	Half Past Dead 2	William Burke	Direct-to-video
2010	Kill Speed	Big Bad John	
2010	Holly, Jingles and Clyde 3D	Gus	
2015	Wrestling Isn't Wrestling	Himself	
2016	Nine Legends	Himself	
2017	Check Point	T.J.	
2017	American Satan	Hawk	
2018	Con Man	Sax	

Television
Year	Title	Role	Notes
1998	The Love Boat: The Next Wave	Lou "The Pariah" Maguire	Episode: "Captain Courageous"
1999	Louis Theroux's Weird Weekends	Himself	Episode: "Wrestling"
1999	E! True Hollywood Story	Himself	Episode: "Hulk Hogan"
2000	The Man Show	Himself	Episode: "Holiday Show 2"
2002	Yes, Dear	Big Guy	Episode: "Walk Like a Man"
2002	Family Guy	Angry bus passenger	Episode: "Family Guy Viewer Mail 1"
2002	Arliss	Himself	Episode: "In with the New"
2002	Kim Possible	Pain King	Episode: "Pain King vs. Cleopatra"
2003	Punk'd	Himself	Episode: "Beyonce and Lindsay Lohan"
2004	Monster Garage	Santa Claus	Episode: "Box-Truck Wrestling Ring"
2005	Modern Marvels	Himself	Episode: "Private Collections"
2005	Desperate Housewives	Inmate	Episode: "My Heart Belongs to Daddy"
2005	Biker Build-Off	Host	
2005	Automaniac	Host	
2005	The Contender	Himself	Episode: "Who's Playing The Game?"
2006	Pros vs. Joes	Himself	Episodes: "Can You PVJ Champ?" and "Can You Cover Jerry Rice?"
2007	Law & Order: Special Victims Unit	Cupid	Episode: "Loophole"
2007–2010	Bullrun	Host	
2008	Hulk Hogan's Celebrity Championship Wrestling	Himself	Episode: "In-Ring Psychology"
2008	Are You Smarter Than a 5th Grader?	Himself / Contestant	Ep. 3.15
2009–2011	Garage Mahal	Host	with Brian Corsetti
2010	The Celebrity Apprentice	Himself / Contestant	
2017, 2019	The Goldbergs	Nick Mellor	8 episodes
2018	The Grand Tour	Himself	Celebrity guest
2018	The Flash	Big Sir	2 episodes
2018–2023	NCIS: Los Angeles	Lance Hamilton	6 episodes
2018–2019	Forged in Fire: Knife or Death	Host	22 episodes
2019	Schooled	Nick Mellor	Episode: "Friendsgiving"

== Championships and accomplishments ==
Goldberg at his WWE Hall of Fame induction in 2018

- Pro Wrestling Illustrated
  - Comeback of the Year (2016)
  - Inspirational Wrestler of the Year (1998)
  - Rookie of the Year (1998)
  - Ranked No. 2 of the top 500 singles wrestlers in the PWI 500 in 1998
- Rolling Stone
  - Ranked No. 5 of the 10 best WWE wrestlers of 2016
- World Championship Wrestling
  - WCW World Heavyweight Championship (1 time)
  - WCW United States Heavyweight Championship (2 times)
  - WCW World Tag Team Championship (1 time) – with Bret Hart
  - Fifth WCW Triple Crown Champion
- Wrestling Observer Newsletter
  - Rookie of the Year (1998)
- World Wrestling Entertainment / WWE
  - World Heavyweight Championship (1 time)
  - WWE Universal Championship (2 times)
  - WWE Hall of Fame (Class of 2018)

== See also ==
- List of gridiron football players who became professional wrestlers
- List of Jewish football players
- List of Jewish professional wrestlers
