= 2017 Cohoes fire =

Structure fire in New York, United States

- Date: November 30, 2017
- Location: Cohoes, New York; 42.7705°N 73.7008°W
- Type: Structure fires
- Property damage: At least $4 million
- Convicted: John Gomes
- Charges: Arson, Reckless endangerment
- Sentence: 1 year imprisonment and $600,000 fine

The 2017 Cohoes fire was a non-fatality fire that destroyed three residential buildings and affected 28 others in Cohoes, New York. Damage was estimated to be at least $4 million. The fire started on November 30, 2017 when a local resident, John Gomes, attempted to imitate a metalworking technique from the History Channel series Forged in Fire. Flames from a burn-barrel he was using were spread by wind to adjacent structures.

Gomes was charged with counts of felony arson and reckless endangerment, and released after posting bail. Around 28 people, including Gomes, were displaced. No deaths were reported. There were minor injuries, including a firefighter who was taken to a hospital. Gomes pleaded guilty to arson and in June 2018, he was sentenced to one year in jail and a $600,000 fine.
