= Brian Corsetti =

American TV personality

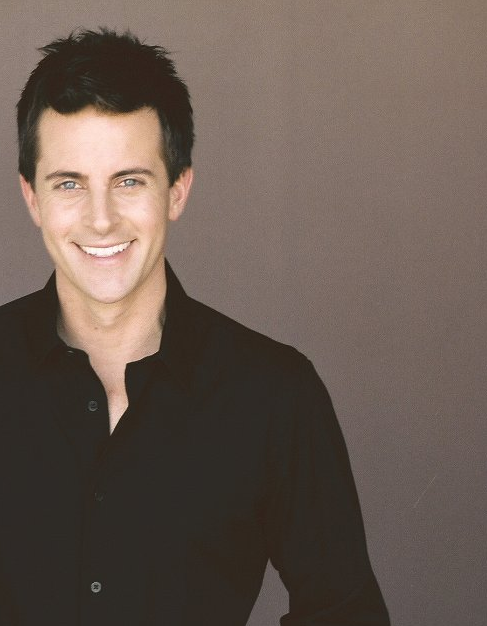
- Born: Brian Stephen Corsetti; St. Petersburg, Florida, U.S.
- Occupations: Car Builder & Television Personality
- Years active: 2003–present
- Website: www.corsetticruisers.com

Brian Stephen Corsetti is an American car builder and television personality.

== Early and personal life ==
Brian Corsetti grew up in St. Petersburg, Florida and graduated from Hunter College in New York City. While attending college he started his career working for the Ron and Fez radio show at WNEW in New York City (2002–2003). He also appeared on The Opie and Anthony Show in 2003, and later served alongside music producer Matt Serletic at Virgin Records, in New York City and London.

== Career ==
Brian first got on the scene with The Dew Report, hosting a six episode extreme sports show where he traveled across the country in search for the ultimate extreme sport. He then had his own show on the DIY Network called Garage Mahal where he, along with co-host pro wrestler Bill Goldberg, transform ordinary garages. Following that, he hosted The Victoria's Secret Fashion Show Behind the Scene Coverage on CBS which won him multiple awards.

In 2010 Brian appeared alongside Alec Baldwin, John O'Hurley, and Robert Kennedy Jr., when he hosted A Celebrity Sports Invitational in Banff, Canada, and one in Jamaica for NBC. In 2011, he acted as an executive producer, and television host in the FOX Sports show The Great Ride, where he traveled around the US in search of the ultimate motorcycle ride.

Other shows include Hollyscoop on FOX and "ENTV", an entertainment show, for ION Television, Yahoo, and AOL, and the nationally syndicated show THE LIST.

He won an Emmy for his talent on the E. W. Scripps Company owned show THE LIST in 2016.

In 2017 he won his second Emmy Award as best TV Host in a syndicated series for E. W. Scripps Company

== Other ventures ==
In 2018 Jay Leno featured Brian on his show Jay Leno's Garage regarding his Land Cruiser collection. Shortly after Brian launched Corsetti Cruisers in 2019 where he builds classic 4X4's from the ground up. Specifically the Toyota Land Cruiser.

In 2023, Corsetti Cruisers collaborated with Joel McHale and Super73 on a special edition Corsetti SE all electric bike. This special edition series was inspired by the Corsetti Cruiser Brian built for Joel which included an 430 horse power LS3 motor, upgraded technology and retro style decals on the side of a completely restored 1990 Toyota Land Cruiser.
