= Knife or Death =

American competition series

- Season 2 poster
- Also known as: Forged in Fire: Knife or Death
- Genre: Reality
- Country of origin: United States
- Original language: English
- No. of seasons: 3
- No. of episodes: 22

Production
- Executive producer: Jim Pasquarella
- Producers: Jodi Flynn, David George, Simon Thomas and Vincent Cariati
- Running time: 42 minutes
- Production company: Outpost Entertainment

Original release
- Network: History
- Release: April 17, 2018 – September 19, 2019

Knife or Death (officially Forged in Fire: Knife or Death) is an American competition series that airs on the History channel. It is a spinoff from the successful Forged in Fire television series.

The show is hosted by previous NFL player and WCW/WWE professional wrestler Bill Goldberg, and co-host Tu Lam, a former US Army Special Forces Soldier, martial artist and edged weapons expert. Two-time Forged in Fire champion Travis Wuertz assists as the show's blade inspection specialist.

On each episode, eight contestants compete through two rounds, using edged weapons that they have either forged themselves or had fabricated to their specifications. They must submit their weapons to a preliminary examination by Wuertz and can be immediately disqualified in case of a safety issue or failure. The contestant who finishes the second-round course in the shorter time advances to the season finale, with a $20,000 cash prize at stake.

Knife or Death premiered April 17, 2018 on History and is produced by Outpost Entertainment.

== Format ==
The contestants in each episode run two obstacle courses individually. A 25-second penalty is added to a contestant's time if they do not complete an obstacle properly, and a catastrophic weapon failure (defined as damage that renders a weapon unsafe or ineffective for further use) results in disqualification.

=== Round One: Knife Fight ===
The first round, "Knife Fight", is a course that tests the quality of the contestants' weapons and their ability to strike stationary targets. The two who either finish the course or move the furthest along it in the shortest time advance to the second round. The course consists of five obstacles:

- Trailblazer: Cut through six 1" wooden dowels or hemp ropes, each of which releases a torch to swing down into a bucket.
- Stick and Move: Three containers (including a wooden crate and a plastic bucket) hang from chains with counterweights suspended on the other end. Each container must be pierced/damaged so that enough of the contents spill out to let its counterweight hit the floor.
- Ice Pick: Strike a 3-foot-tall block of ice and pierce a tube of liquid running up through its center.
- Lifeline: Slash cleanly through three hanging targets: a chicken, a fish, and a plastic tube filled with sand. The contestant is given one attempt per target; a failure on any of them stops the clock and ends the contestant's run immediately.
- Curtain Call: Cut through two hanging targets: a slab of pork belly and a piece of sheet metal. The contestant must then drive the blade into a wooden stump to stop the clock.

=== Round Two: Dead Run ===
The second round, "Dead Run", is a course intended to test the two remaining contestants' speed, timing, accuracy, and precision in wielding their blades against both stationary and moving targets. The contestant who finishes the course in the shorter time advances to the season finale. This course consists of six obstacles:

- Steak Knife: Cut five steaks in half as they hang from a rotating carousel.
- Extinguisher: Four lit candles are set beneath funnels. For each, the contestant must cut a rope to release a bottle of water, then slice the bottle on the downswing so that enough water lands in the funnel and puts out the candle.
- Weight Cut: Cut 40 pounds each from a hanging ice block and rack of meat slabs.
- Free Fall: One at a time, cut 10 watermelons in half as they are released from overhead chutes. Each cut must expose the melon's red flesh in order to count.
- Strike Zone: Cut a rope to release a curtain, then cut all the targets behind it (ropes, water bottles, slabs of meat, etc.) in half.
- Firestorm: Cut two ropes, releasing a flight of steps to fall into place, then run up the steps to a platform and chop through a stack of sugar cane.

=== Season finale changes ===
In the season finale, the five episode winners and the runner-up with the fastest time in Dead Run compete for the $20,000 prize. All targets are thicker and/or made of tougher materials, with the following specific changes:

- Ice Pick: The ice block has two embedded tubes of liquid that must both be pierced.
- Lifeline: No longer a sudden-death obstacle. The contestant may make multiple attempts, but incurs a time penalty for every attempt after the first on a target.
- Curtain Call: The contestant must cut through three targets (pork loin, plywood, and sheet metal).
- Steak Knife: Renamed Rotisserie, with chickens replacing the steaks.
- Weight Cut: The rack of meat slabs is replaced by a second ice block, and the contestant must cut at least 80 pounds from each block before advancing.

== Series overview ==
Season	Episodes	Originally released	
Season	Episodes	First released	Last released
1	6	April 19, 2018	May 22, 2018
2	8	October 3, 2018	November 22, 2018
3	8	August 28, 2019	September 19, 2019

== Episodes ==
All times include penalties assessed for failing to complete an obstacle properly.

=== Season 1 (2018) ===
Episode	Original air date	Title	Winner	Time
1	April 17, 2018	"The Last Samurai"	Jo Smith	3:11
2	April 24, 2018	"All the Barong Moves"	Jason Johnson	3:28
3	May 1, 2018	"A Fish Called Lifeline"	Michael Allenson	2:51
4	May 8, 2018	"Super Smash Bros."	Dwayne Unger	3:45
5	May 15, 2018	"The Kukri Monster"	Jacob Gayton	5:01
6	May 22, 2018	"Last Action Hero"	Michael Allenson	2:06

=== Season 2 (2018) ===
Episode	Original air date	Title	Winner	Time
1	Oct 3, 2018	"Forged in Fire All Stars"	Keith	6:50
2	Oct 10, 2018	"Blade Runners"	Zeke	8:09
3	Oct 17, 2018	"Enter the Yatagan"	Eric	4:10
4	Oct 24, 2018	"American Choppers"	Tom	5:25
5	Oct 31, 2018	"Gladius Maximus"	Earl Culver	5:05
6	Nov 7, 2018	"Don't Fear the Recurve"	Joel	4:43
7	Nov 14, 2018	"Mutant Ninja Chickens"	Jeffery Robinson	5:02
8	Nov 21, 2018	"$20,000 Dead Run"	Keith	5:39

=== Season 3 (2019) ===
Episode	Original air date	Title	Winner	Time
1	Aug 28, 2019	"David vs. Goliath"	Don	5:21
2	Aug 29, 2019	"Military All-Stars"	Jonathon	5:51
3	Sep 5, 2019	"Death Fish"	Duy	NT
4	Sep 5, 2019	"Seax & Violence"	Sam	8:35
5	Sep 12, 2019	"Fortune Kukri"	Dan Weston	6:03
6	Sep 12, 2019	"Messers of the Universe"	RJ Kriegsmesser	2:45
7	Sep 19, 2019	"Hard Knock Knife"	Mike	5:54
8	Sep 19, 2019	"Blade Fest of the Champion"	Dan Weston	6:03
