= Super73 =

US electric bicycle manufacturer

SUPER73
- Company type: Private
- Industry: Manufacturing; Electric bicycles
- Founded: 2016; 10 years ago, Orange County, California, United States
- Founders: Michael Cannavo, Aaron P. Wong, Legrand Crewse, Alix Armour & John Kim
- Headquarters: Irvine, CA, Irvine, California 92612, United States
- Products: Electric bicycle Electric bicycles
- Website: super73.com

SUPER73 is an American lifestyle adventure brand and manufacturer of electric bicycles based in Irvine, California. It is best known for its product line of motorcycle styled electric bicycles, custom bicycle builds for celebrities, and high-profile e-bike collaborations.

== History ==
=== 2016 ===
SUPER73 was founded in 2016 A by Michael Cannavo and Aaron P. Wong along with John Kim, Alix Armour and Legrand Crewse. The company started as a Kickstarter crowdfunding campaign promising a premium electric bicycle called the "Super73" for a $25k fundraising goal. The bikes designed and built by Kim along with the viral promotional video by Cannavo resulted in a highly successful crowd funding campaign which generated over $441k from backers. The nostalgic design defined a new bicycle category (electric motorbike) and along with features like a built in bottle opener was positively received by design and fashion magazines worldwide.

=== 2017 ===
In 2017, the company started to earn a reputation as a social media collaborator with celebrities like Will Smith, Coco Rocha Casey Neistat, and Jesse Wellens. Most notably, they built Star Wars Return of the Jedi themed speeder bikes and costumes to film a Star Wars cosplay video that went viral on YouTube, which further cemented SUPER73 as “The Content Creator’s Bike”.

On July 10, 2017, the company announced a second model, the SUPER73-S1. It featured a 500-watt rear wheel hub motor, a motorcycle fuel tank styled battery, and LED headlight. To avoid confusion between the original SUPER73 model, the Scout was renamed the SG1, while the original model was renamed the OG1. Also, with the launch of the SG1, the company announced the sale of the limited “Rose Ave” edition, which was the first of their product collaborations done with a celebrity, Jesse Wellens.

=== 2018 ===
On Nov.11, 2018, the company launched a third model to their product line, the Z model. The Z model was significant because it had a retail price of US$1,000, making it affordable to a wider audience. Along with the expansion of their product line up, the company received $8.75million USD in investment and started sales in Europe. Also in May 2018, the American actor and rapper, Will Smith, launched an Instagram video showcasing the Super73. The video went viral, further cementing the company's reputation for collaborating with celebrities.

=== 2019 ===
In 2019, the company expanded its collaborations with prominent celebrities and brands. On November 4, 2019, they unveiled a limited edition SUPER73-Z1 model in collaboration with Parisian football club Paris Saint-Germain (PSG). The launch of the limited edition PSG model, coincided with the 50th anniversary of the legendary football team.

=== 2020 ===
In Feb 2020, SUPER73 launched their SUPER73-R Series, marking a significant departure from their earlier designs. This new model featured full suspension, a major upgrade from the rigid frames and suspensionless design of previous models. They also unveiled the SUPER73-S2, an upgraded version of their popular SUPER73-S1 model, featuring front suspension and sleek new colorways.

Later in the year, SUPER73 secured $20-million in Series B funding, led by Boston-based growth equity firm Volition Capital.

=== 2021 ===
In 2021, the company produced several high-profile collaborations, including an off-road motorcycle-inspired e-bike designed with renowned motorcycle racer and designer Roland Sands. They also partnered with American toy manufacturer Mattel to create a special edition Hot Wheels x SUPER73 e-bike. Additionally, the company launched a limited-edition haute couture e-bike in collaboration with French luxury fashion house, Yves Saint Laurent.

=== 2024 ===
In 2024; Super73 faced legal challenges when a class-action lawsuit was filed in California alleging that several of its models were marketed as e-bikes but in practice could exceed legal speed and power limits under California law, effectively making them motor vehicles rather than bicycles. In the same year, Super73 launched its 2024 model year lineup, which included upgraded battery options - notably the 500 PRO, 750 PRO and 1000 PRO batteries, with and the addition of a 48-volt lighting system on the Z Miami and ZX models.

=== 2025 ===
In 2025; Super73 unveiled its “Legacy Series” line of e-bikes, building on the brand’s moto-inspired design heritage with updated powertrains, enhanced performance and new styling across its Z-, S- and R-series models. The Legacy Series introduces up to 30% more acceleration on selected models and UL 2271-compliant battery systems, offering riders improved pickup on start, hill-climbing ability and range improvements in a variety of colors and trim levels. The rollout reflects Super73’s strategy to widen its appeal to both city- commuters and adventure-oriented riders, while keeping its position electric bicycle market.

=== Models ===
Major Models
	OG1	OG2	S1	Z1	MZFT	ZX	S2	R
Motor	1000 watts	1000 watts	500 watts	500 watts	500 Watts	1350 watts	2000 watts	2000 watts
Suspension	None	Front Wheel (Optional)	None	None	Front	Front on Submodels	Front Wheel	Front & Rear Wheels
Range	25–30 miles	25–30 miles	50 miles	15–20 miles	15–20 miles	25–35 miles	35–45 miles	40–55 miles
Frame	Steel	Steel	Steel	Steel	Aluminum	Aluminum	Aluminum	Aluminum
Status	Discontinued	Discontinued	Discontinued	Discontinued	Available	Available	Available	Available
