= San Diego Jewish Journal =

Jewish magazine

- Type: Magazine
- Format: Print and digital
- Publisher: Mark Edelstein, Mark Moss
- Editor-in-chief: Susan Edelstein
- Associate editor: Makayla Hoppe
- Art Director: Derek Berghaus
- Founded: October 2001
- Headquarters: San Diego, California
- Circulation: 17,000
- Sister newspapers: OC JLife
- Website: http://www.sdjewishjournal.com

The San Diego Jewish Journal is a Jewish magazine headquartered in Sorrento Valley in San Diego, California. It was founded in October 2001 by Dr. Mark Moss and Mark Edelstein, and first published in December 2001. Their intent was to create a magazine that spoke to all Jewish movements and traditions. In 2007, the magazine served 19,000 subscribers in San Diego, Palm Springs, and Temecula Valley. Mark Moss and Mark Edelstein are the publishers.

In 2007, the San Diego Jewish Times, a biweekly newspaper with which it had competed, with about 16,000 subscribers, ceased publication after 27 years.

The San Diego Jewish Journal won a Simon Rockower Award in 2015 and another in 2016.
