= Throwing knife =

Knife designed to be thrown

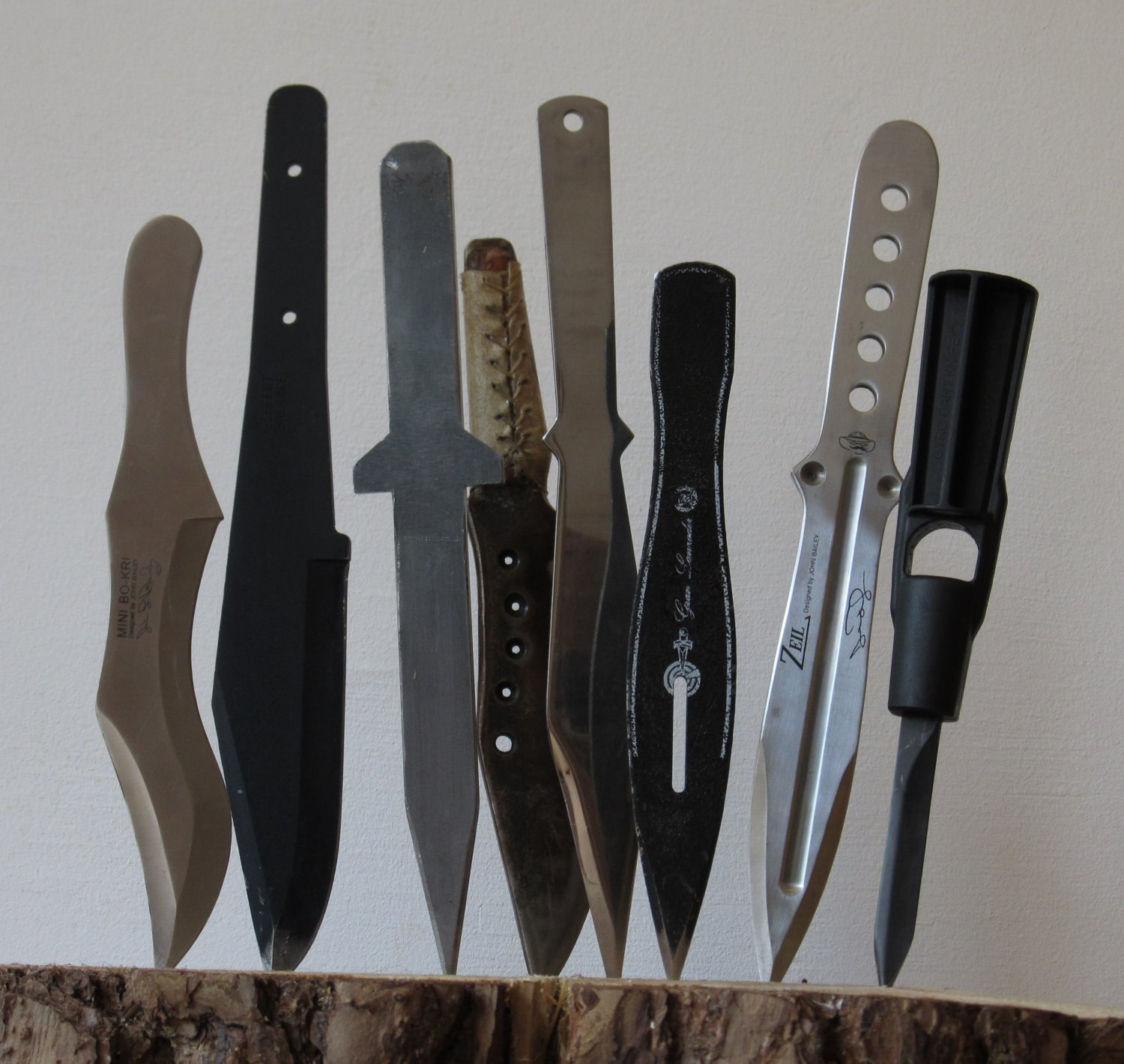
Collection of throwing knives

A throwing knife is a knife that is specially designed and weighted so that it can be thrown effectively. They are a distinct category from ordinary knives.

Throwing knives are used by many cultures around the world, and as such different tactics for throwing them have been developed, as have different shapes and forms of throwing knife.

Throwing knives are also used in sideshow acts and sport.

== Central Africa ==
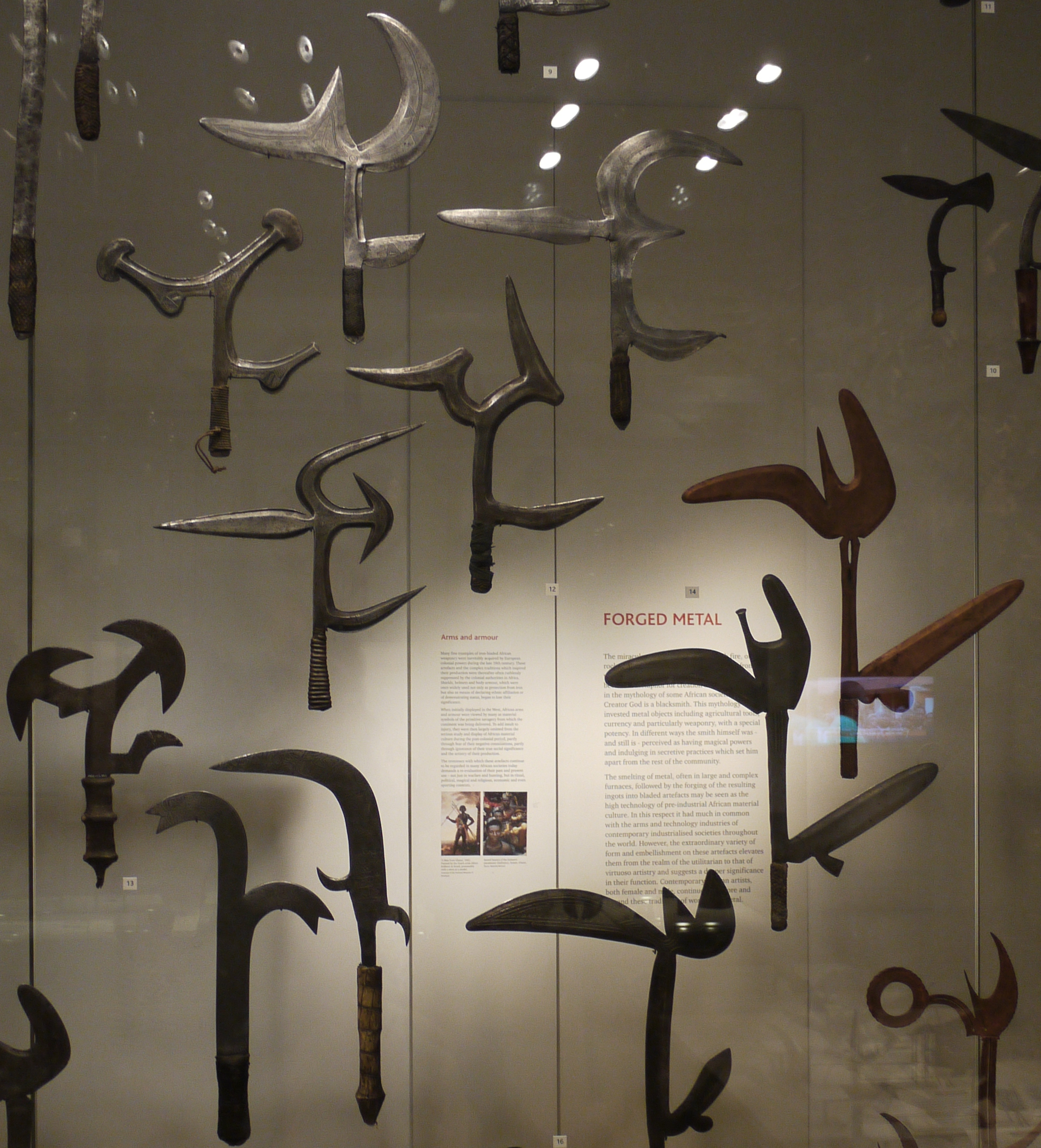
A selection of African throwing knives in the British Museum

Throwing knives saw use in central Africa. The wide area they were used over means that they were referred to by a number of names such as onzil, kulbeda, mambele (kpinga), and trombash. These weapons had multiple iron blades and were used for warfare and hunting. A maximum effective range of about 50 m (160 ft) has been suggested. The weapon appears to have originated in central Sudan somewhere around 1000 AD from where it spread south. It has however been suggested that the same weapon is depicted in Libyan wall sculptures dating around 1350 BC.

The throwing knives were extensively collected by Europeans with the result that many European and American museums have extensive collections. However the collectors generally failed to record the origin of the blades or their use. As a result, the history and use of the throwing knives is poorly understood. A further complication is that the label "throwing knife" was attached by ethnographers to various objects that didn't fit into other weapon categories even though they may not have been thrown.

== Western tradition ==
Throwing knives are commonly made of a single piece of steel or other material, without handles, unlike other types of knives. The knife has two sections, the "blade" which is the sharpened half of the knife and the "grip" which is not sharpened. The purpose of the grip is to allow the knife to be safely handled by the user and also to balance the weight of the blade.

Throwing knives are of two kinds, balanced and unbalanced. A balanced knife is made in such a way that the center of gravity and the geometrical center of the knife (the centroid) are the same. The trajectory of a thrown knife is the path of the center of gravity through the air. When a balanced knife is thrown, the circles described by the point and the end of the hilt as the knife rotates about the center of gravity will have the same diameter, making the trajectory more predictable. For an unbalanced knife, the circles described will have different diameters, meaning that the point and the end of the hilt will hit a target in different locations at any point along the trajectory. This makes predicting the trajectory more difficult.

Balanced knives can be thrown by gripping either the point or the hilt, depending upon the user's preference and the distance to the target. Unbalanced knives are generally thrown by gripping the lighter end. There are also knives with adjustable weights which can slide on the length of the blade. This way, it can function both as a balanced or unbalanced knife depending upon the position of the weight. Balanced knives are generally preferred over unbalanced ones for the reasons that balanced knives can be thrown from the handle as well as from the blade, and that it is easier to change from one balanced knife to another.

The mass of the throwing knife and the throwing speed determine the power of the impact. Lighter knives can be thrown with relative ease, but they may fail to penetrate the target properly, resulting in "bounce back". Heavy throwing knives are more stable in their flight and cause more damage to the target, but more strength is needed to throw them accurately.

Hans Talhoffer (c. 1410-1415 – after 1482) and Paulus Hector Mair (1517–1579) both mention throwing daggers in their treaties on combat and weapons. Talhoffer specifies a type of spiked dagger for throwing while Mair describes throwing the dagger at the opponent's chest.

== See also ==
- Dart (missile)
- Ballistic knife
- Knife throwing
- Throwing axe
- Bagakay
- Shuriken
- List of martial arts weapons
