= Tahunian =

Archaeological stone-age culture

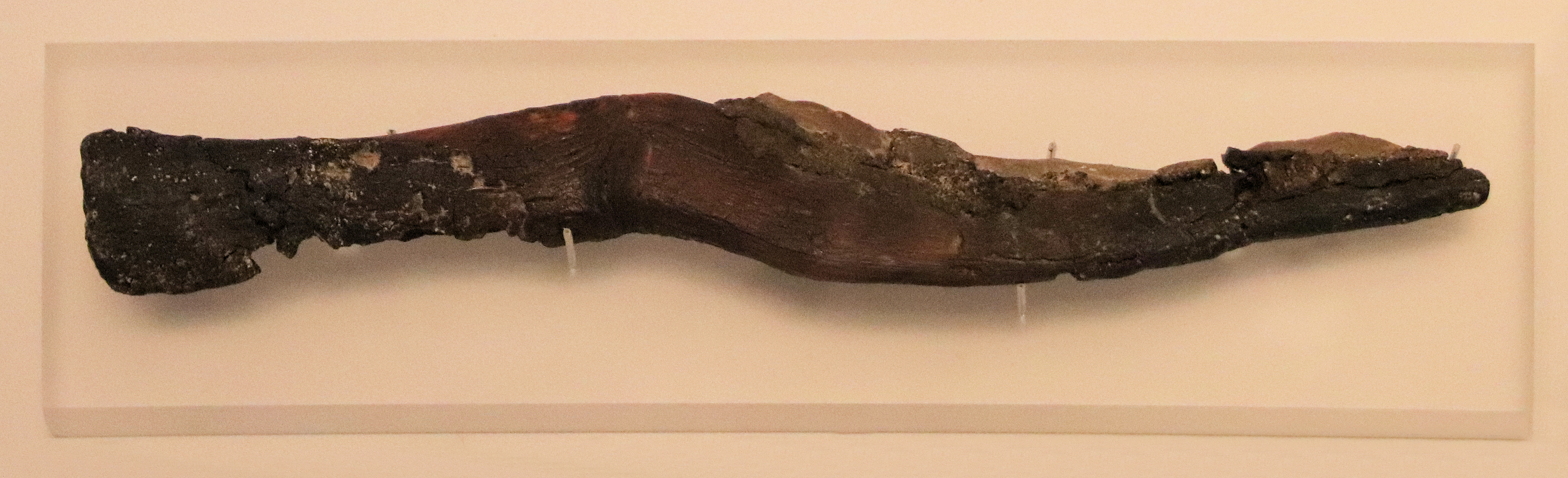
Object said to be "the oldest sickle", flint and resin, Tahunian culture, c. 7000 BC, Nahal Hemar Cave. Israel Museum.

The Tahunian is variously referred to as an archaeological culture, flint industry and period of the Natufian Stone Age around Wadi Tahuna near Bethlehem. It was discovered and termed by Denis Buzy during excavations in 1928.

Due to the early date and problems with the stratigraphy of the excavations at Wadi Tahuna, a great deal of debate has been put forward regarding the definition and position of the Tahunian within the sequences of Mesolithic, Epipaleolithic, Natufian, Khiamian, Heavy Neolithic, Pre-Pottery Neolithic A, Pre-Pottery Neolithic B and Neolithic and its relation to other Neolithic cultures such as the Qaraoun culture. In the search for naming conventions for the culture that started the Neolithic Revolution, this has reduced Avi Gopher to calling it a "Tahunian Pandora's box", resulting in offshoots in terminology such as Proto-Tahunian. It is no longer widely used but would appear to be an early PPNB culture of the Levantine corridor of around 8800 BC according to the ASPRO chronology.
