= Denis Buzy =

- Born: March 22, 1883; Bénéjacq
- Died: May 21, 1965 (aged 82); Bethlehem
- Known for: Excavation of Wadi Tahuna in 1928
- Scientific career
- Fields: Archaeology

Denis Buzy (born at Bénéjacq March 22, 1883; died at Bethlehem May 21, 1965) was a French archaeologist who excavated the Tahunian culture at Wadi Tahuna near Bethlehem in 1928.

Buzy was a Betharram Father and in 1933 published the Life of St. John the Baptist, the forerunner of our Lord.

== Biography ==
Denis Buzy was born at Bénéjacq, in the Basses-Pyrénées on March 22, 1883; after studying philosophy and theology at the seminary of the Congregation of the Priests of the Sacred Heart in Betharram in Bethlehem, he was ordained as a priest on August 24, 1906. He continued his studies in Rome where he obtained a doctorate in philosophy and theology and in 1911 in Holy Scripture.

His career continued in Bethlehem from 1908 to 1935, where he began archaeological and biblical work. He conducted excavations of the Tahuna (Stone Age) culture at Wadi Tahuna near Bethlehem in 1928. He was elected Superior General in 1935 of the Congregation of the Betharram Fathers, a position he held until 1958. He put his sons through World War II. He had the merit of instituting national seminars in Argentina, England and Italy where new vocations were born in a growing congregation. He organized the congregation in new provinces with missionary and educational activities in Thailand and French North Africa (there was for example a college in Casablanca).

He then retired to Bethlehem where he continued his Bible and exegetical studies. At the same time, he was the spiritual director of the Carmel of Bethlehem. T.R.P. Buzy died in 1965.
