= Onzil =

Throwing knife from eastern Gabon

An onzil (or osele or musele) is a throwing knife of ethnic groups from eastern Gabon (Kota, Fang, Mbété).

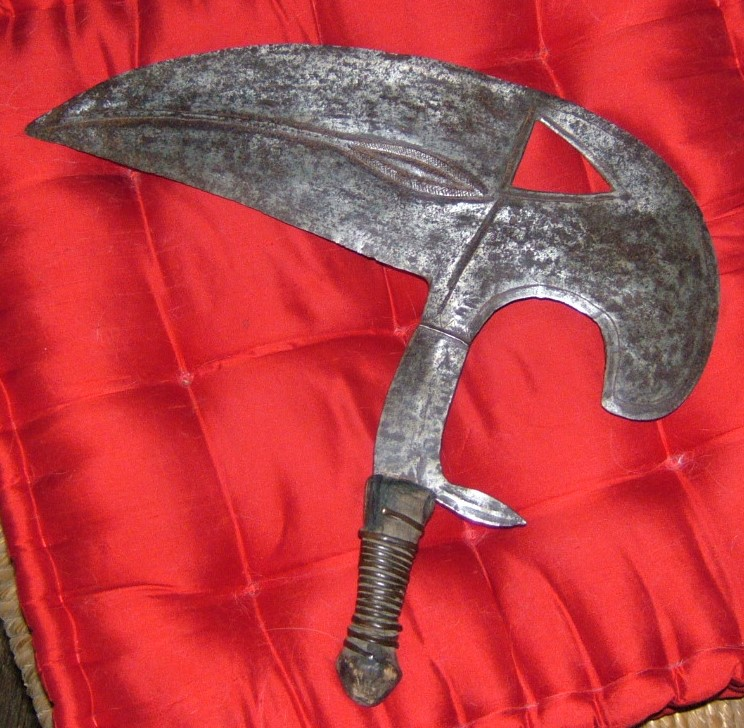
Onzil from eastern Gabon

== Uses ==
Looking like an axe, the onzil has a calao-shaped blade. Its handle, often made of wood, is covered with copper wire, iron or brass. Sometimes handles are made of ivory. The onzil served as sacrificial weapons or for war. The Kotas called them osele or musele, and the Fang called them onzil. Early forms of this style knife, associated with the Fang people, had shorter straight handles. Kota people are neighbors of the Fang and likely from them adopted this style of knife.

== Gallery ==
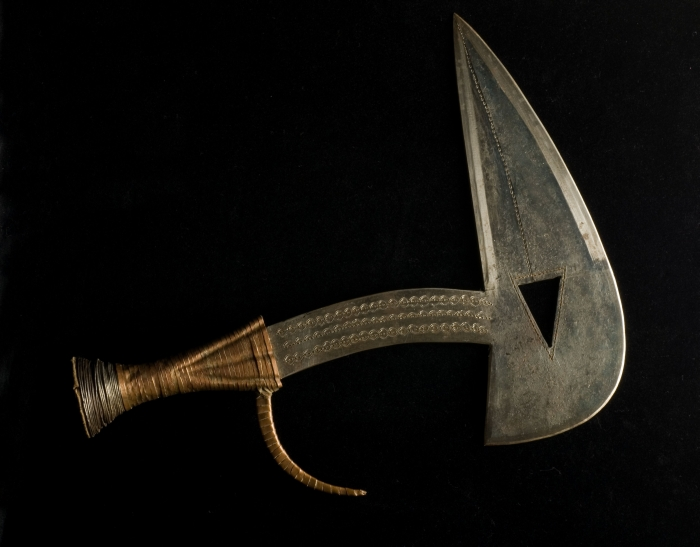
Classical onzil

Rare fish shaped onzil

== Bibliography ==
- Jan Elsen, De fer et de fierté, Armes blanches d’Afrique noire du Musée Barbier-Mueller, 5 Continents Editions, Milan, 2003, ISBN 88-7439-085-8
- Louis Perrois, L'esprit de la forêt : terres du Gabon, 1997, p. 141
- Manfred A.Zirngibl-Werner Fischer, Afrikanische Waffen
