= Nahal Hemar Cave =

Archeological cave site in Israel

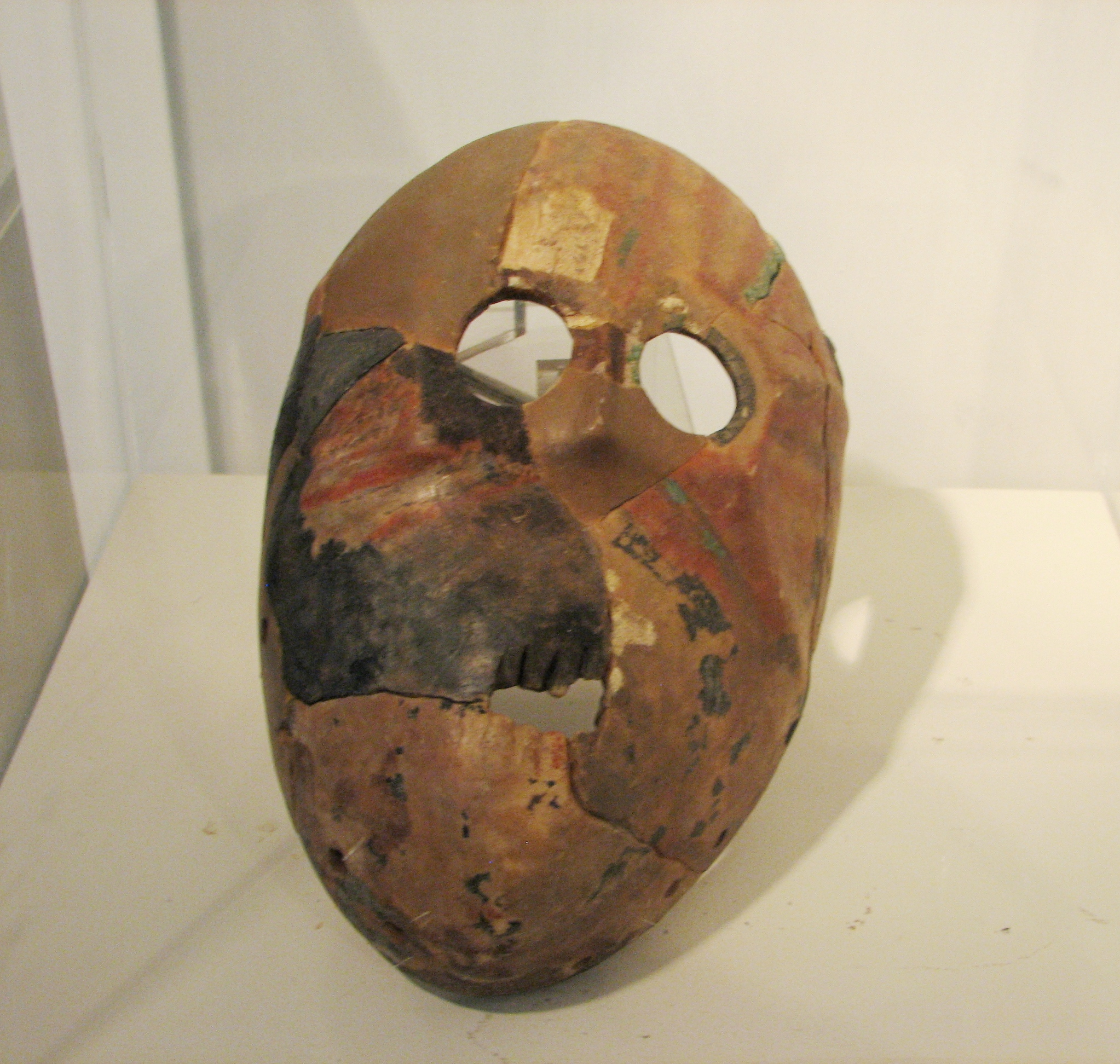
- Replica Stone Mask, Nahal Hemar Cave, Pre-Pottery Neolithic B period

- Location in Israel
- 31.1392°N 35.2939°E
- Type: cave
- Cultures: Pre-Pottery Neolithic

Site notes
- Excavation dates: 1983
- Archaeologists: Ofer Bar-Yosef, David Alon

Nahal Hemar Cave (Hebrew: מערת נחל חימר) is an archeological cave site in Israel, on a cliff in the Judean Desert near the Dead Sea and just northwest of Mount Sodom.

The artifacts discovered here are among the most important Pre-Pottery Neolithic assemblages in the Levant. They include wooden artifacts, fragments of baskets and plaster assemblages. Objects found in the cave include rope baskets, fabrics, nets, wooden arrowheads, bone and flint utensils including a sickle and weaving spatulae, and decorated human skulls. There were also ceremonial masks similar to other neolithic masks found inside a 50 km (30 mi) radius of the Judean Desert and Judean Hills and unusual so-called "Nahal Hemar knives."

Many of the fabric pieces found were dated from the Pre-Pottery Neolithic period, placing them in the 7th millennium BC. The flax fiber items were processed and spun into yarn, and archaeologists divided these items into four groups: yarns, nalbinding (looping), knotted netting, and twining. The fabrics contained nalbinding assemblages, which are an early form of looping, predating both crochet and knitting.

The trove was found covered in what was thought to be asphalt from nearby construction projects. Closer analyses revealed it was in fact an ancient glue that dated to around 8310–8110 years ago. It was collagen-based, possibly deriving from animal skins and may have served to waterproof the objects or as an adhesive. Similar glue was previously identified in Egypt, but that found in Nahal Hemar was twice as old.

== Plaster assemblages ==
This group of beads, basketry, and statue fragments is believed to have been used for ritual purposes. This lime plaster was one of the first intentionally made chemical alterations where the makers had complete control over the properties. The presence of the plaster has been deemed of great importance because of the efforts applied to the process of making and applying the plaster.

The beads found in this assemblage may have been used on garments designed for specific events.

== The method of examining the plaster assemblages ==
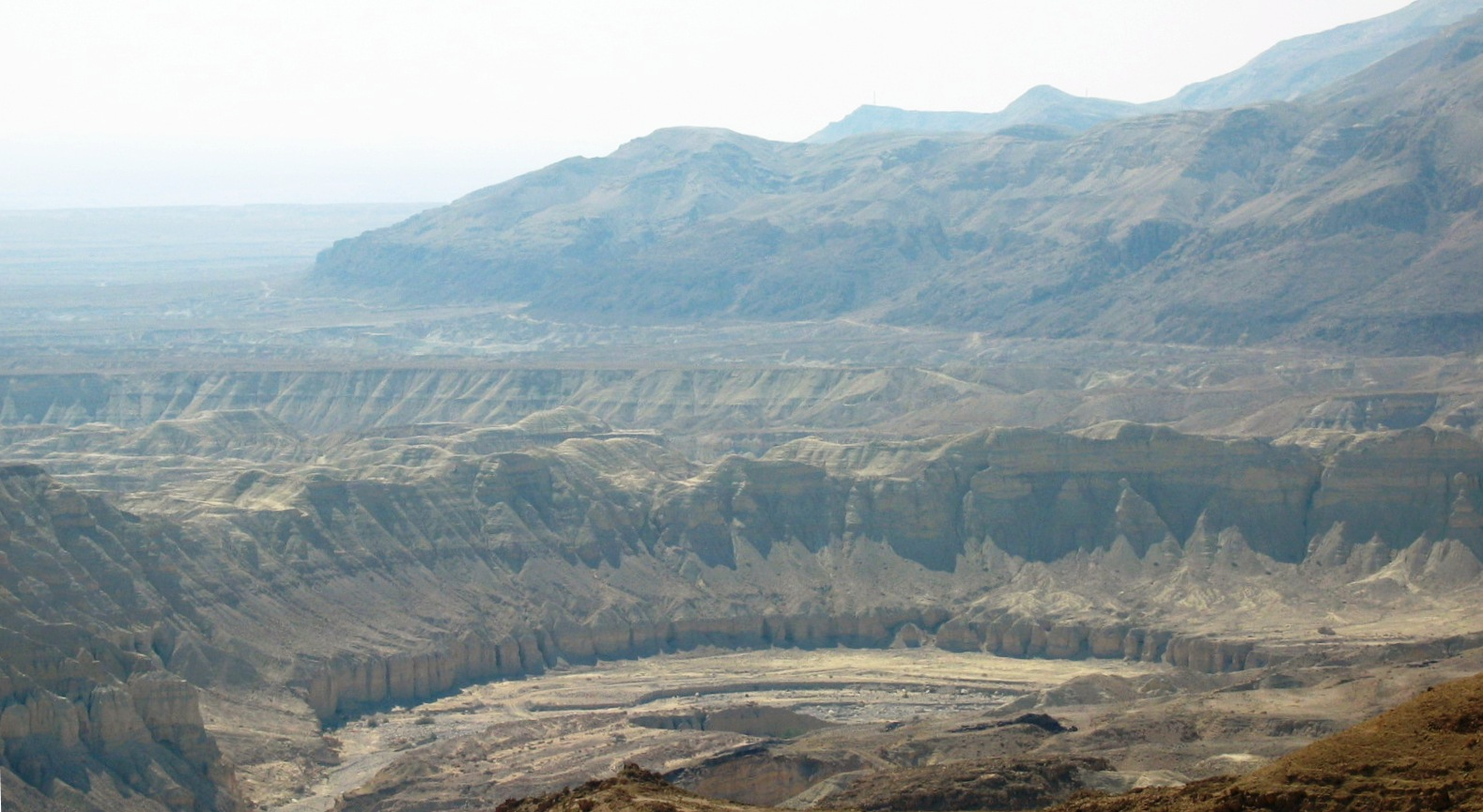
Hemar stream canyon situated in the Judean Desert, Israel, near Masada, descending to the Dead Sea. There are headsprings located in the canyon, providing salt and sweet water during the year to local flora and fauna.

The artifacts were examined in the following ways:

1. All the plaster statue fragments and plaster beads were examined under a Wild M-8 stereoscopic microscope under oblique illumination to roughly define the homogeneity of the samples.

2. Tiny lumps of plaster were removed from the items on several locations using a diamond saw, spatulas, and fine drillbits. Chips with film casting pigments were sampled in several cases for chemical analyses of straining materials. Broken artifacts were used in most cases to preserve the remaining artifacts.

3. Bulk samples were subjected to thin-section petrographic analysis (TSPA).

4. Mineralogical analyses of the non-calcareous components were carried out on more samples. The admixture of clay was observed through the TSPA analysis. The samples were powdered and soaked in 3% Hydrochloric acid (HCl) to remove the carbonate ingredients. The clay mineralogy was determined by X-ray diffraction (XRD).

5. Chemical analyses were done on most samples using inductively coupled plasma atomic emission spectrometry (ICP-AES). The benefit of this method is that it has high accuracy with low limits of detection.

6. Small lumps coated with yellow, green, red, or dark pigments were removed from the plaster statue and beads and used for X-ray fluorescence (XRF) analysis. This provided a chemical definition of the pigment materials.

The results of the study:

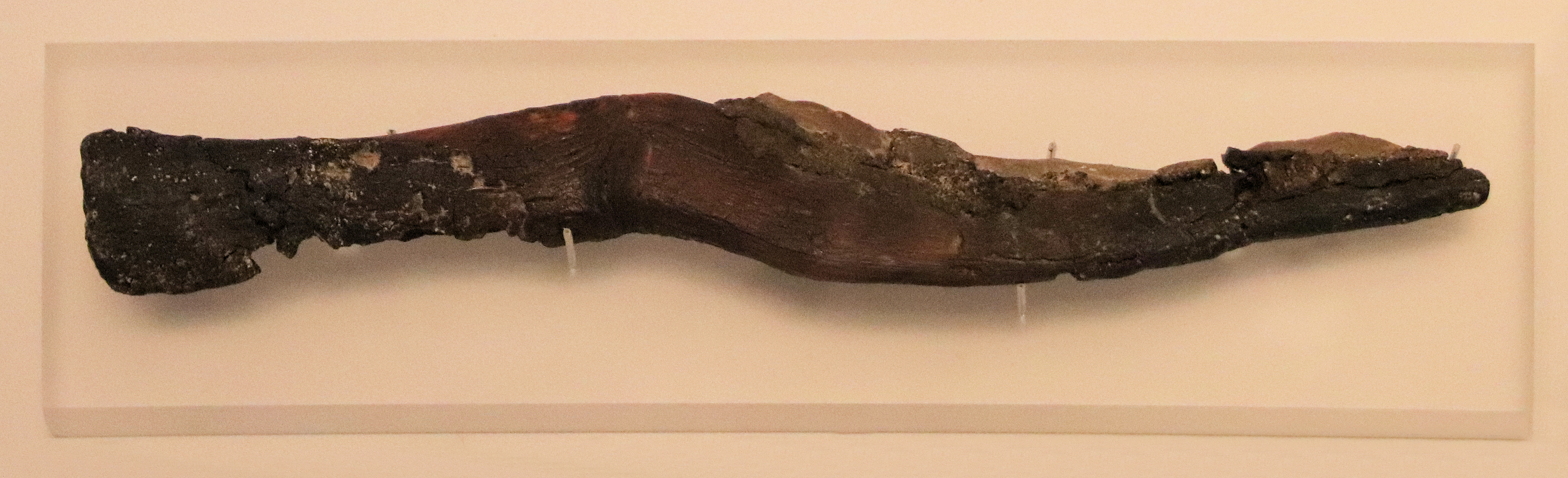
Object said to be "the oldest sickle", flint and resin, Tahunian culture, c. 7000 BC, Nahal Hemar Cave. Israel Museum.

Beads: All but one bead was produced from a mixture of burnt lime and calcite crystals. The sole exception with anhydrite crystal also appear within the burnt lime (this was indicated by both time-series panel analysis (TSPA) and atomic spectroscopy (ICP-AES analyses). All beads were densely populated with calcite crystals. The beads were likely all made in the same place, for the same reason, and used in the sane way. All were made by the same technique, which can be seen in their mineralogy and chemistry. It is assumed that the beads were used as parts of garments or costumes for a specific event.

Statues: The statues have opposite homogeneity compared to the beads and baskets. The statues vary greatly in their technology and compositions. The statues can be broken up into seemingly four different categories of statues based on their composition. This hints to the fact they were likely built in different locations possibly by the Mediterranean shore and were brought to Nahal Hemar in their present state. There was more than likely little done to the statues once they got into Nehal Hemar. It is thought that the statues were used for ceremonies or ritual activities and the different statues had different symbols.

== Magical site ==
Nahal Hemar with its small size is proposed to be a place for religious ceremonies or magic that was part of an ancestor cult as indicated by the decorated skulls and carved limestone masks. Celebrants may have worn the masks to honor the dead. Other artifacts at the site such as the partial garments and animal and anthropoid figurines have bolstered the notion it principally serving magical purposes. Additionally, the statue fragments may have been brought from distant locations as a donation that was part of the rituals.

== See also ==
- Dead Sea Scrolls
- Citrullus colocynthis
- Göbekli Tepe
