= Trumbash =

Throwing knife

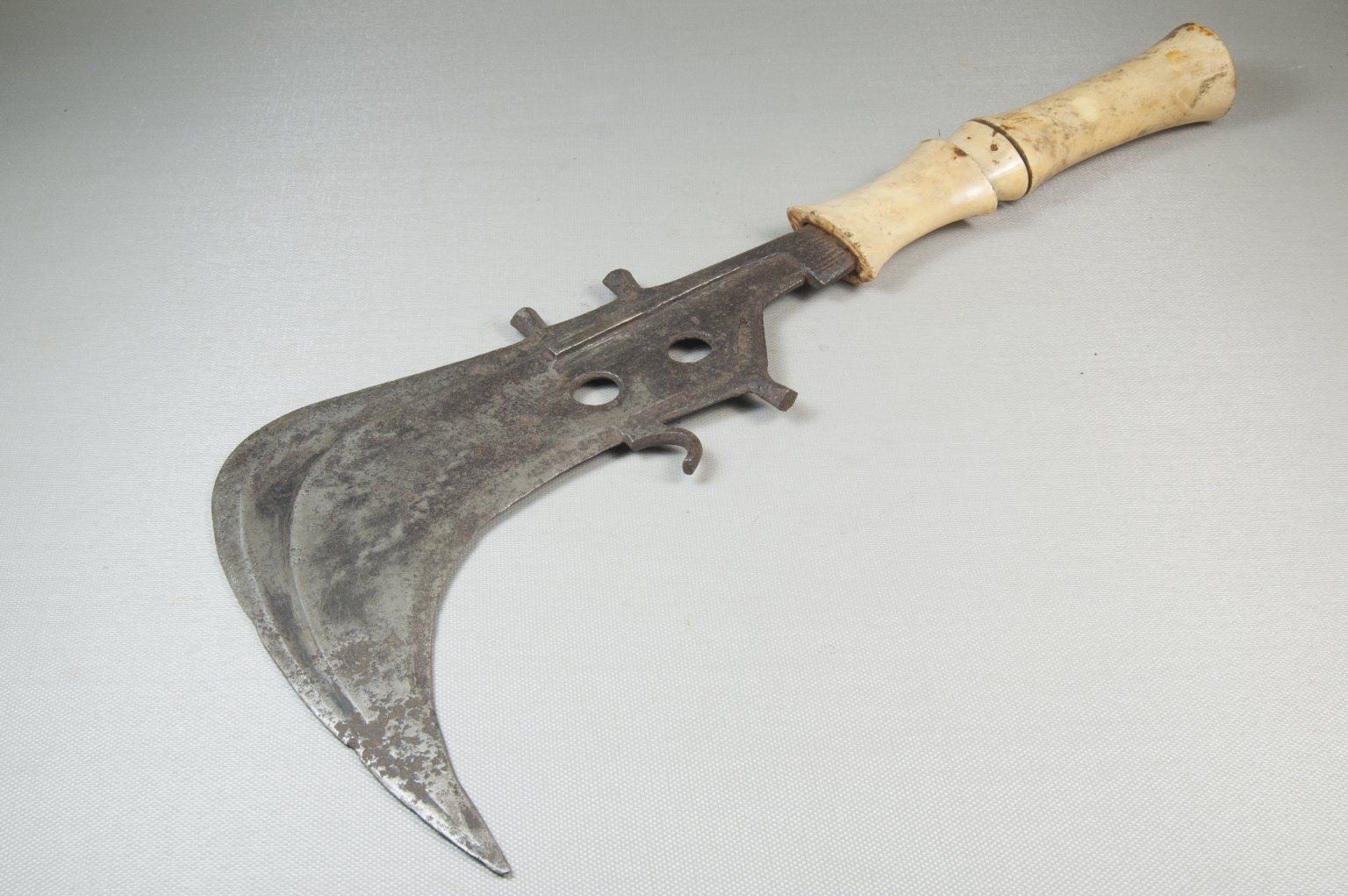
Trumbash with an ivory handle

A trumbash or trombash is a Mangbetu throwing knife from the Democratic Republic of the Congo.

== Uses ==
Similar to a sickle, the trumbash was used as a throwing weapon or as currency. The handle is usually made of wood, but it can be made of ivory or bone. It is more or less decorated, according to the rank of its owner and the use that is made of it. The curved blade is made of iron.

== Gallery ==
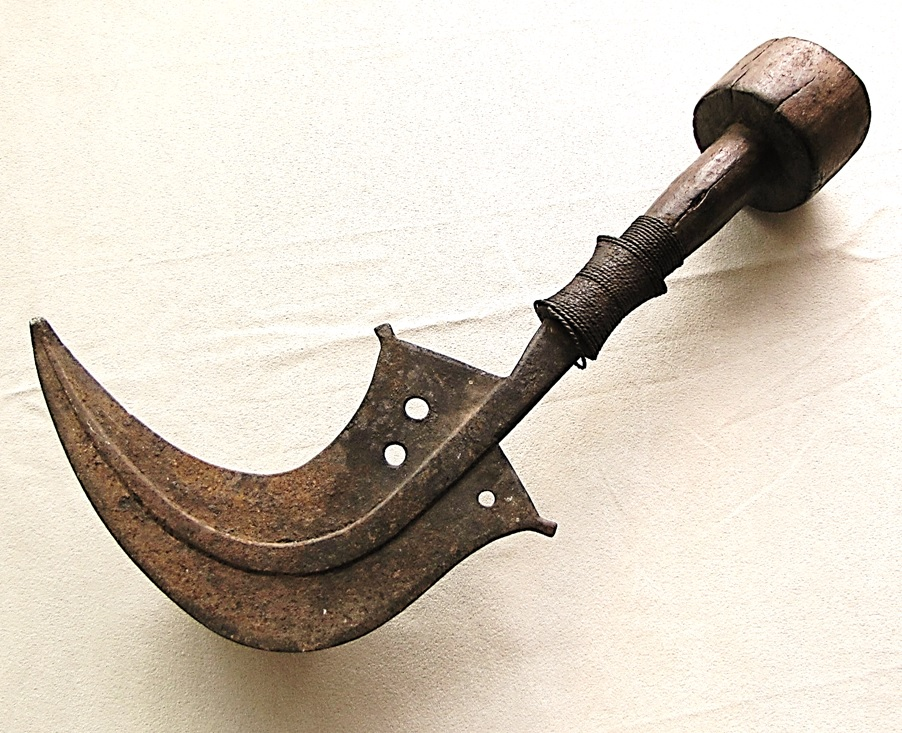

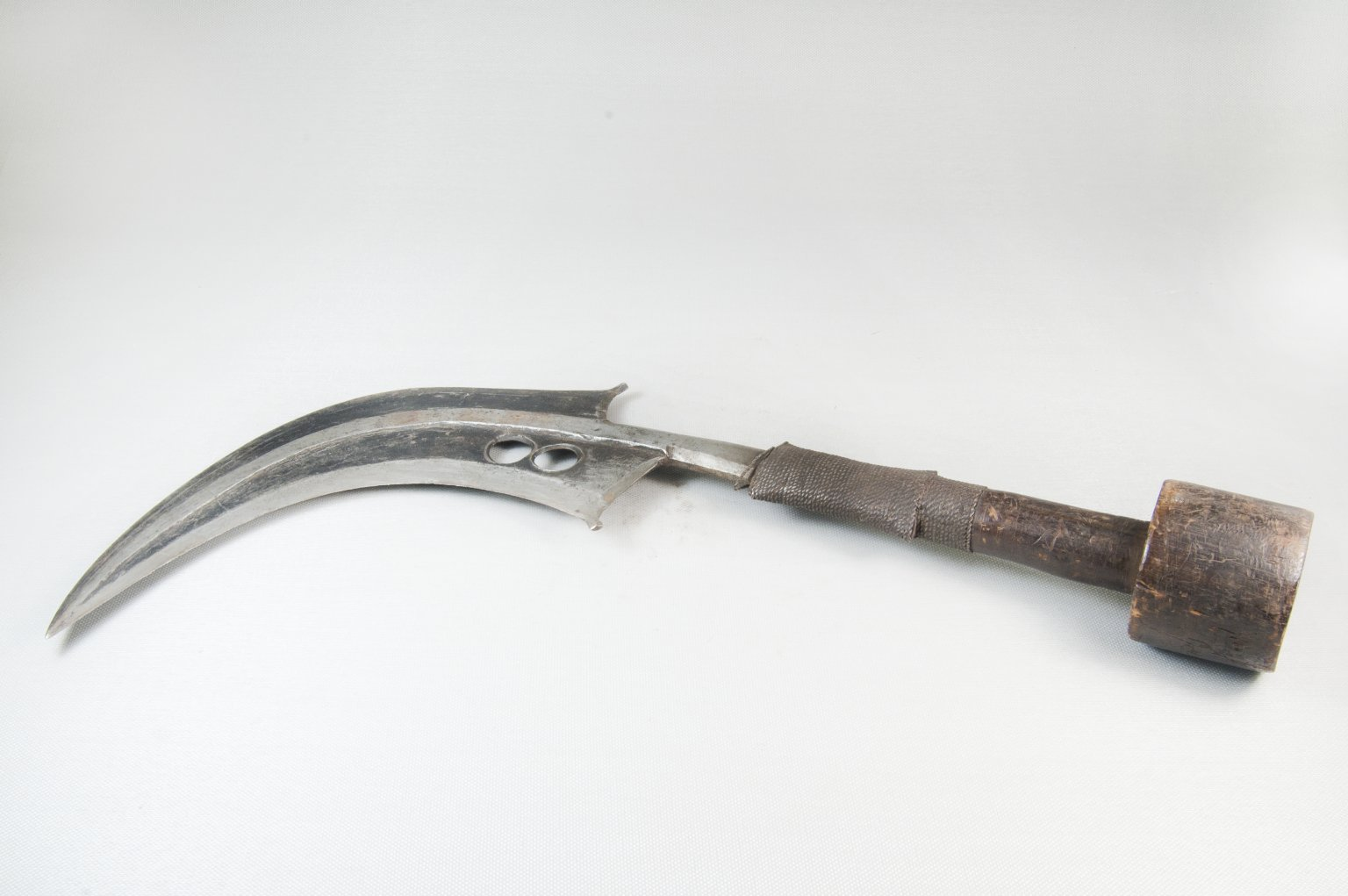

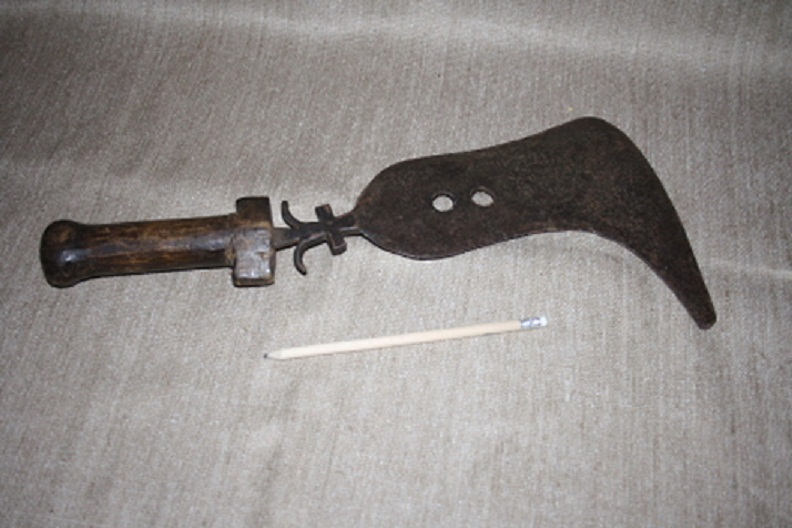

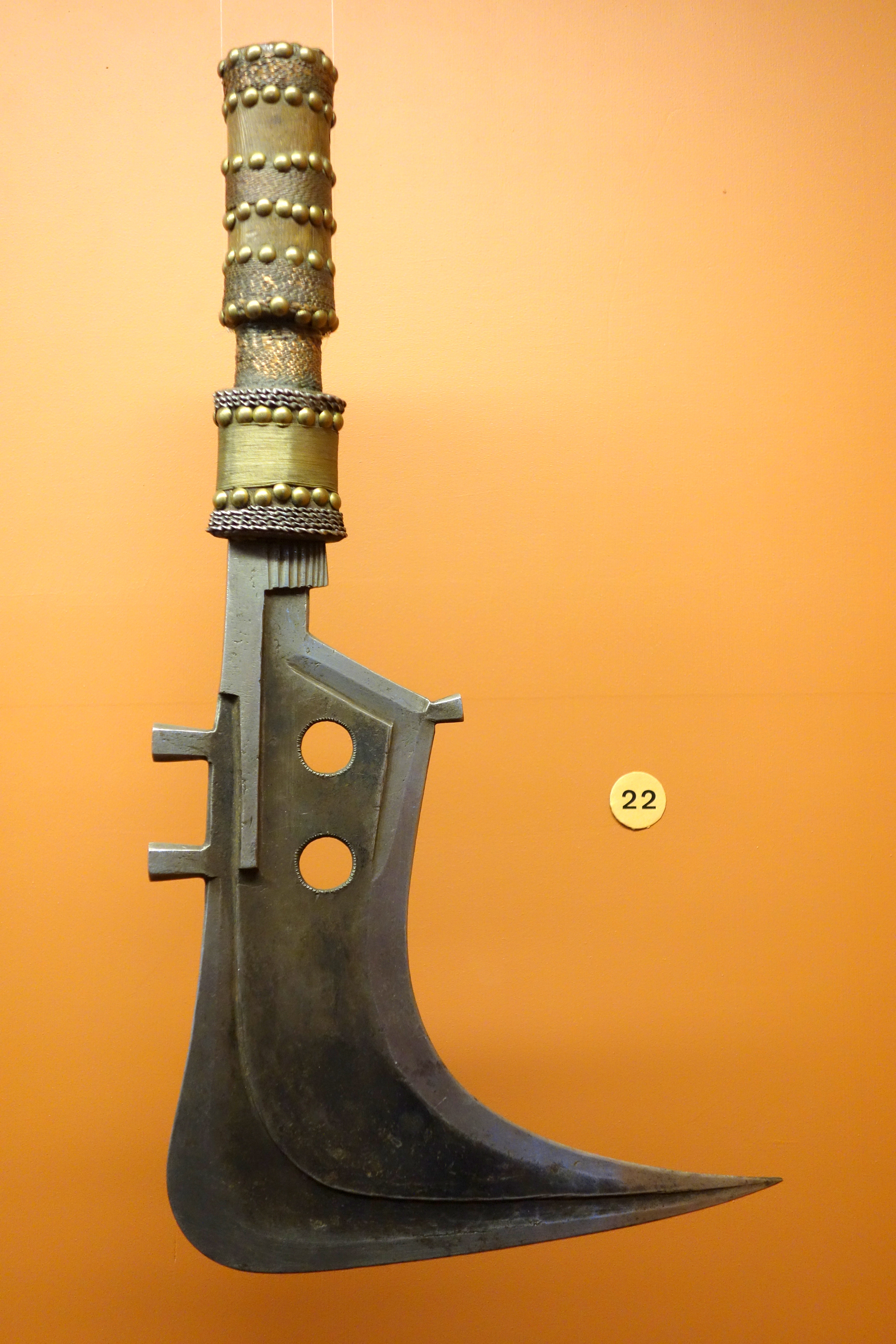

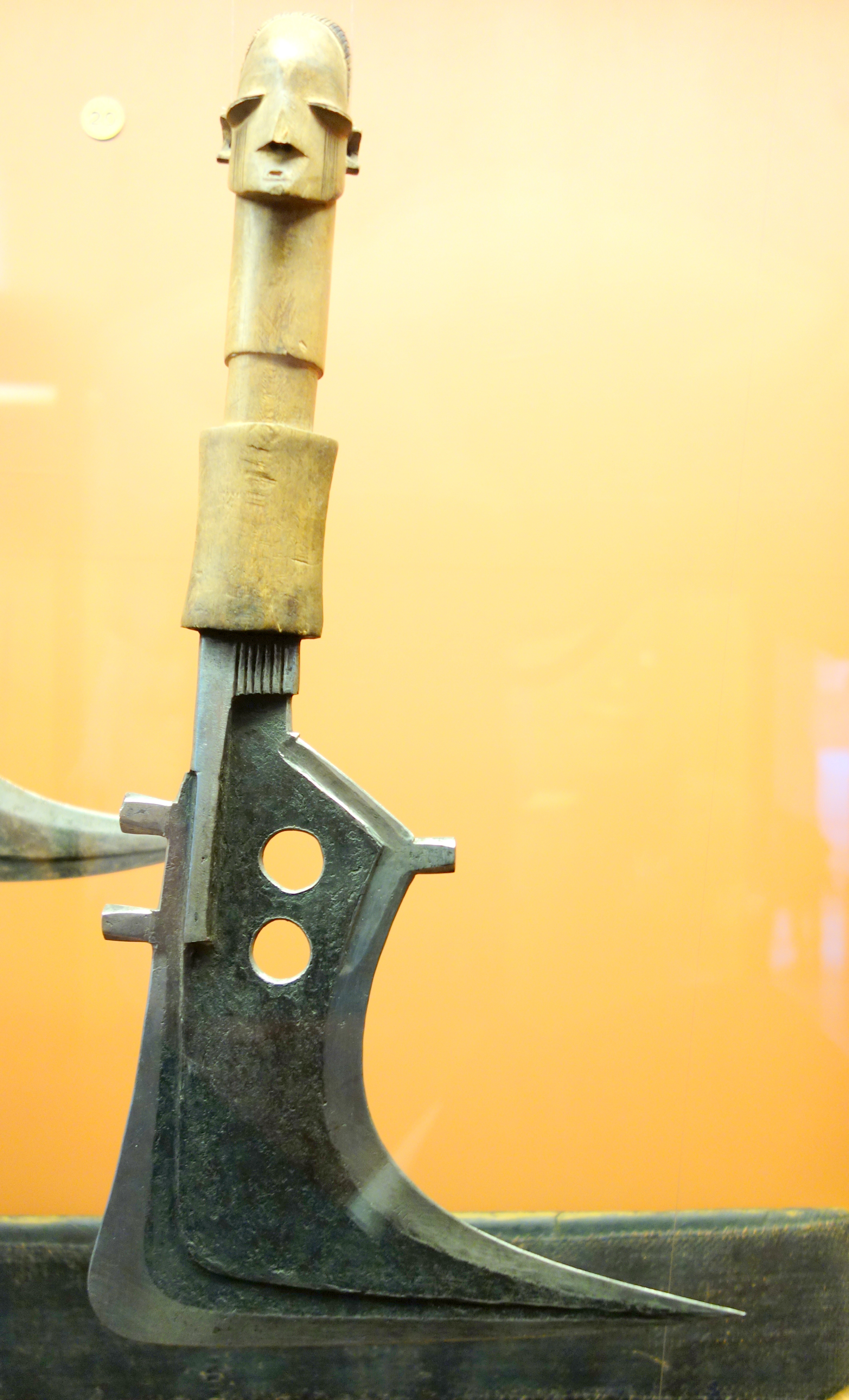
Trumbash with an anthropomorphic handle

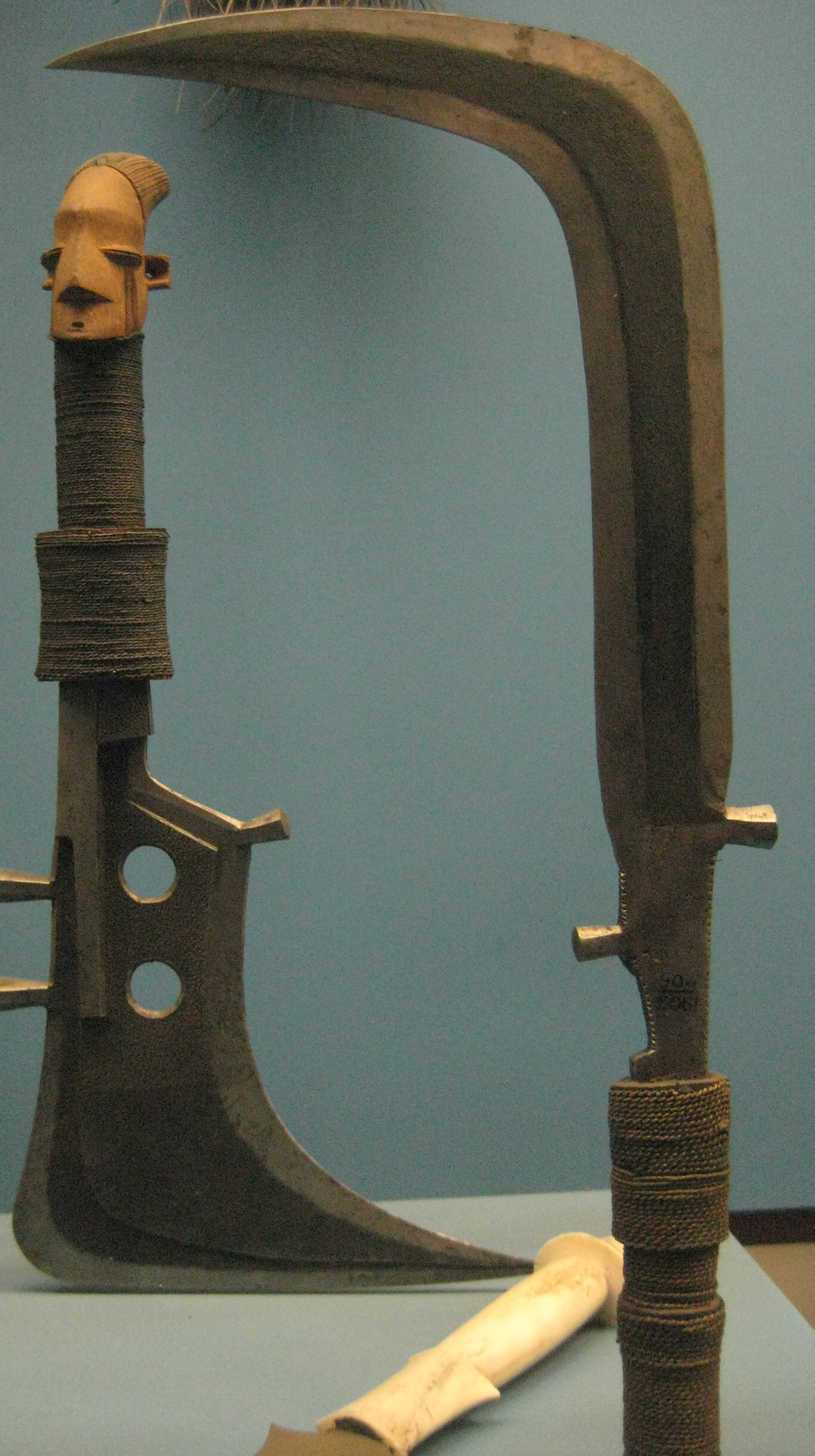

== Bibliography ==
- Jan Elsen, De fer et de fierté, Armes blanches d'Afrique noire du Musée Barbier-Mueller, 5 Continents Editions, Milan, 2003, ISBN 88-7439-085-8
- Tom Crowley, Andrew Mills, Weapons, Culture and the Anthropology Museum, 2018
