= Sickle =

Single-handed agricultural tool

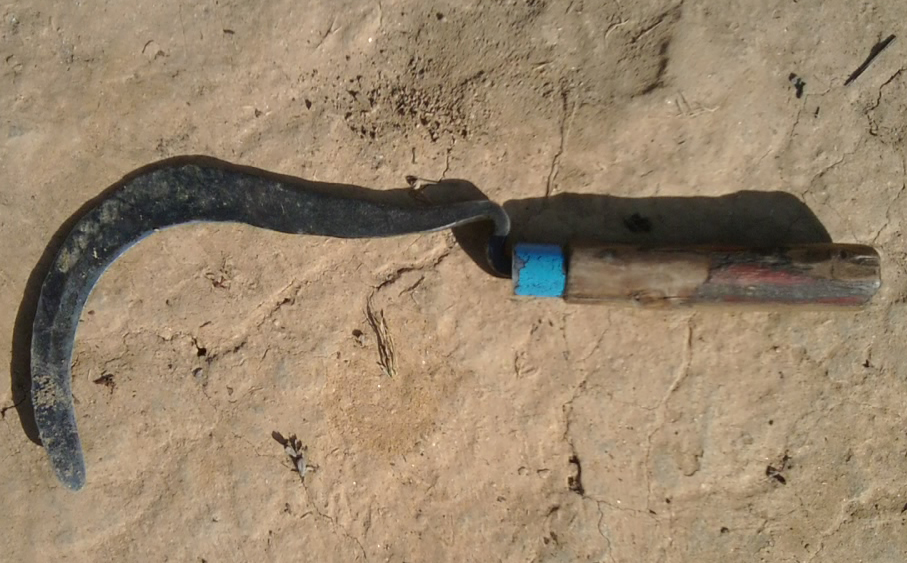
- Nepalese sickle from Panchkhal
- Other names: Bagging hook, reaping-hook
- Classification: Cutting
- Related: Scythe

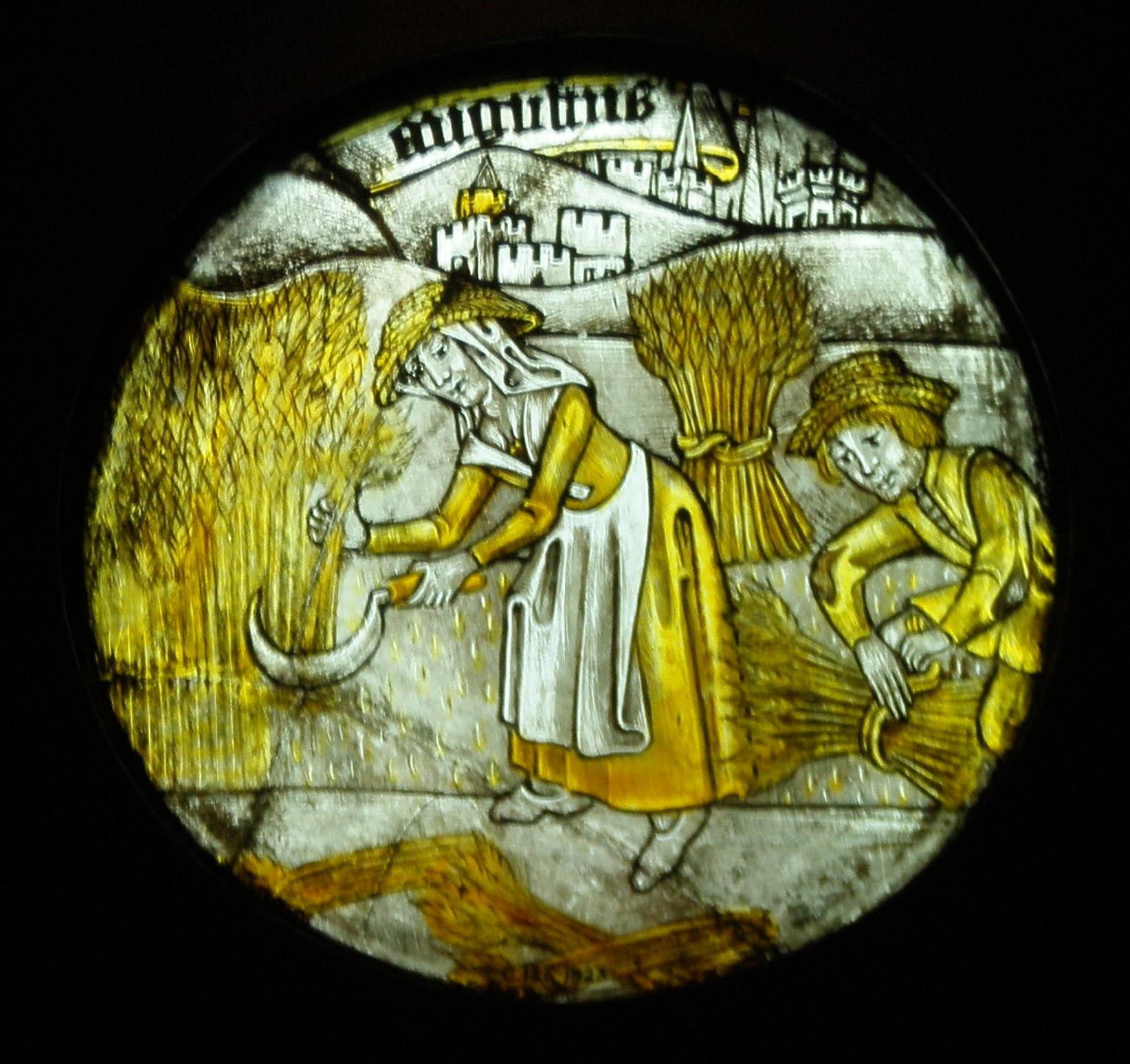
One of 12 roundels depicting the "Labours of the Months" (1450–1475)

A sickle, bagging hook, reaping-hook or grasshook is a single-handed agricultural tool designed with variously curved blades and typically used for harvesting or reaping grain crops, or cutting succulent forage chiefly for feeding livestock. Falx was a synonym, but was later used to mean any of a number of tools that had a curved blade that was sharp on the inside edge.

Since the beginning of the Iron Age hundreds of region-specific variants of the sickle have evolved, initially of iron and later steel. This great diversity of sickle types across many cultures can be divided into smooth or serrated blades, both of which can be used for cutting either green grass or mature cereals using slightly different techniques. The serrated blade that originated in prehistoric sickles still dominates in the reaping of grain and is even found in modern grain-harvesting machines and in some kitchen knives.

== History ==
=== Pre-Neolithic ===
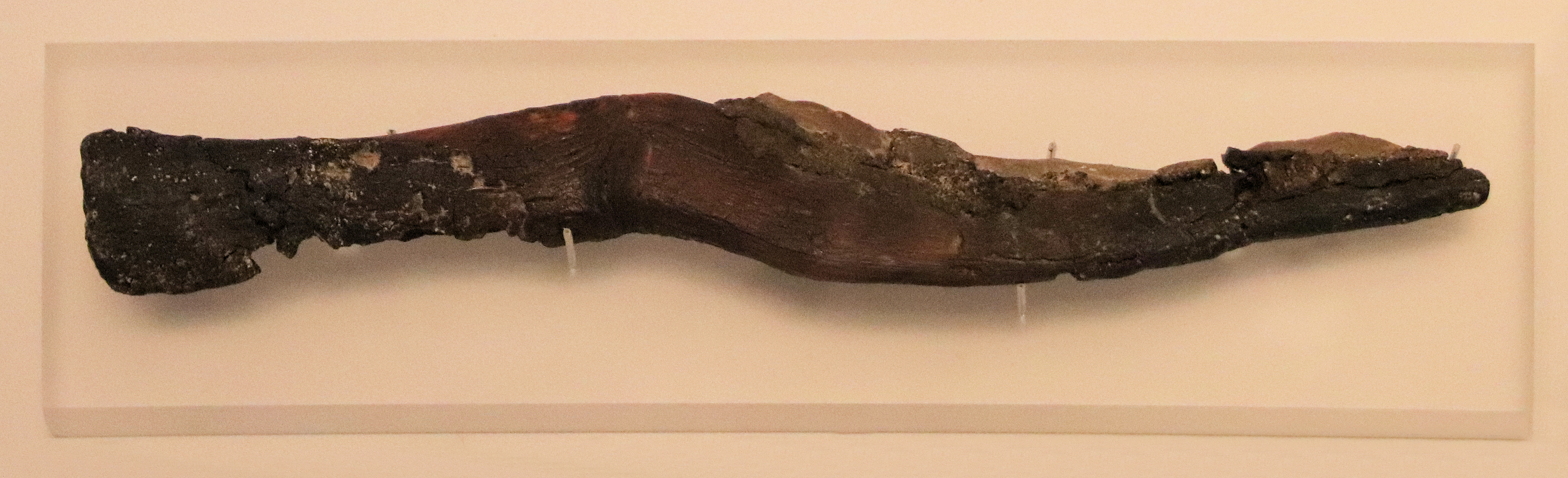
A very early sickle, c. 7000 BC, flint and resin, Tahunian culture, Nahal Hemar cave, now in the Israel Museum.

Harvesting sickles, first developed around 15,000 years ago, had wooden handles and flint blades. Their basic design remained largely unchanged for thousands of years across different cultures. The development of the sickle in Mesopotamia can be traced back to times that pre-date the Neolithic Era. Large quantities of sickle blades have been excavated in sites surrounding Israel that have been dated to the Epipaleolithic era (18000–8000 BC). Formal digs in Wadi Ziqlab, Jordan have unearthed various forms of early sickle blades. The artifacts recovered ranged from 10–20 cm (3.9–7.9 in) in length and possessed a jagged edge.

This intricate ‘tooth-like’ design showed a greater degree of design and manufacturing credence than most of the other artifacts that were discovered. Sickle blades found during this time were made of flint, straight and used in more of a sawing motion than with the more modern curved design. Flints from these sickles have been discovered near Mt. Carmel, which suggest the harvesting of grains from the area about 10,000 years ago.

=== Neolithic ===
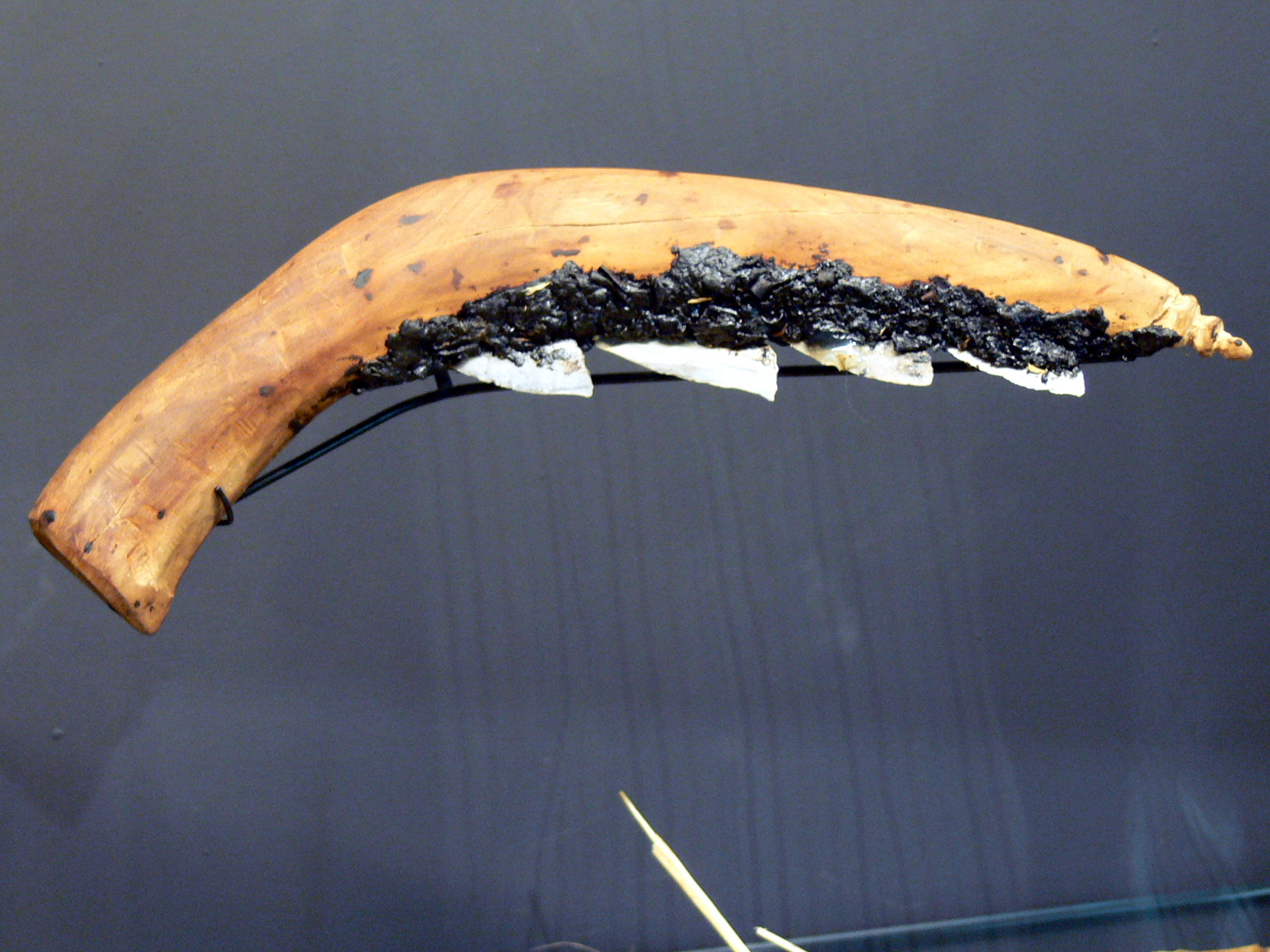
Neolithic sickle

The sickle had a profound impact on the Agricultural Revolution by assisting in the transition to farming and crop based lifestyle. It is now accepted that the use of sickles led directly to the domestication of Near Eastern Wild grasses. Research on domestication rates of wild cereals under primitive cultivation found that the use of the sickle in harvesting was critical to the people of early Mesopotamia.

The relatively narrow growing season in the area and the critical role of grain in the late Neolithic Era promoted a larger investment in the design and manufacture of sickle over other tools. Standardization to an extent was done on the measurements of the sickle so that replacement or repair could be more immediate. It was important that the grain be harvested at the appropriate time at one elevation so that the next elevation could be reaped at the proper time. The sickle provided a more efficient option in collecting the grain and significantly sped up the developments of early agriculture.

=== Bronze Age ===
The sickle remained common in the Bronze Age, both in the Ancient Near East and in Europe. Numerous sickles have been found deposited in hoards in the context of the European Urnfield culture (e.g. Frankleben hoard), suggesting a symbolic or religious significance attached to the artifact.

In archaeological terminology, Bronze Age sickles are classified by the method of attaching the handle. E.g. the knob-sickle (German Knopfsichel) is so called because of a protruding knob at the base of the blade which apparently served to stabilize the attachment of the blade to the handle.

=== Iron Age ===
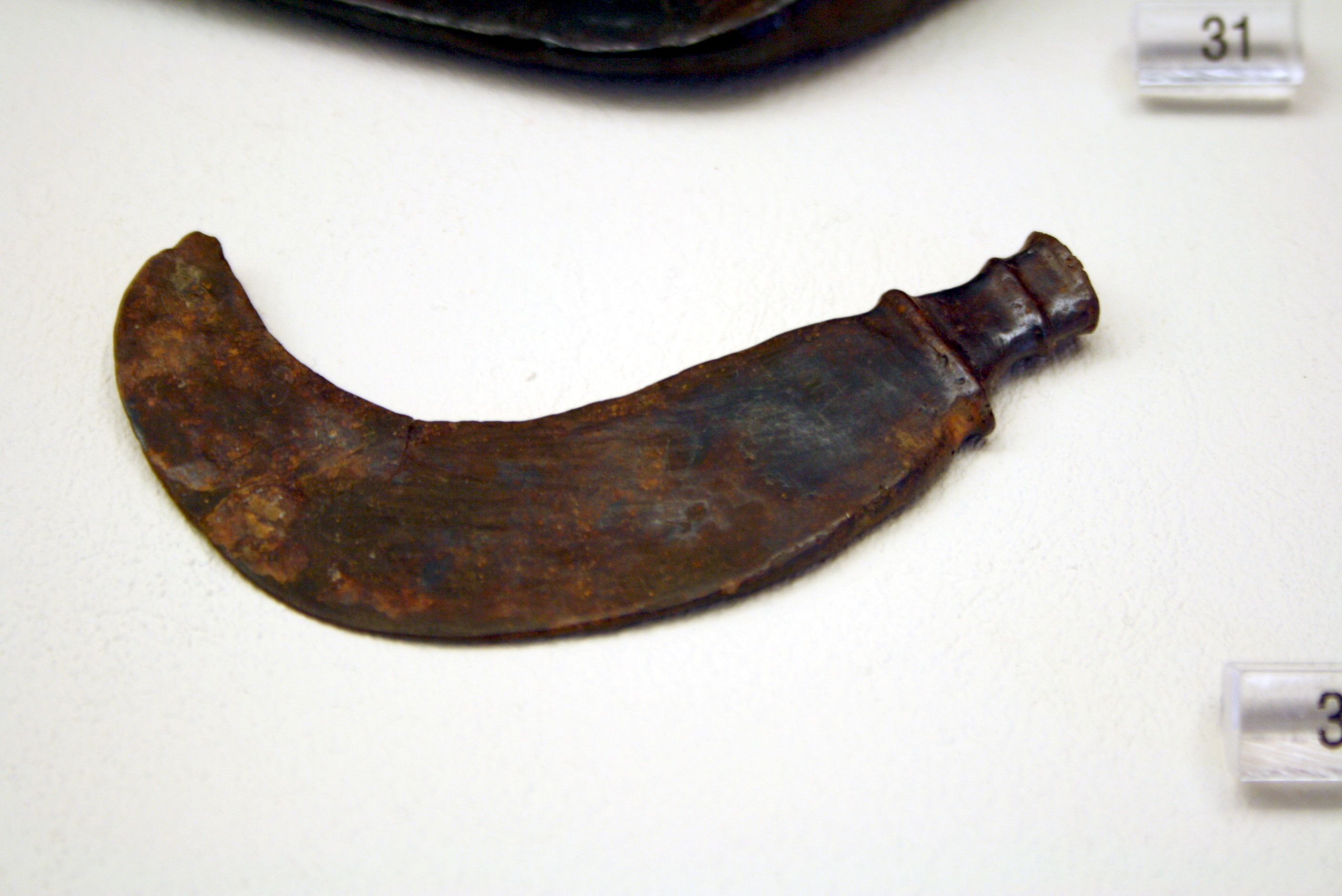
Ancient Greek iron sickle, Kerameikos Archaeological Museum, Athens.

The sickle played a prominent role in the Druids' Ritual of oak and mistletoe as described from a single passage in Pliny the Elder's Natural History:

A priest arrayed in white vestments climbs the tree and, with a golden sickle, cuts down the mistletoe, which is caught in a white cloak. Then finally they kill the victims, praying to a god to render his gift propitious to those on whom he has bestowed it. They believe that mistletoe given in drink will impart fertility to any animal that is barren and that it is an antidote to all poisons.

Due to this passage, despite the fact that Pliny does not indicate the source on which he based this account, some branches of modern Druidry (Neodruids) have adopted the sickle as a ritual tool.

=== Americas ===
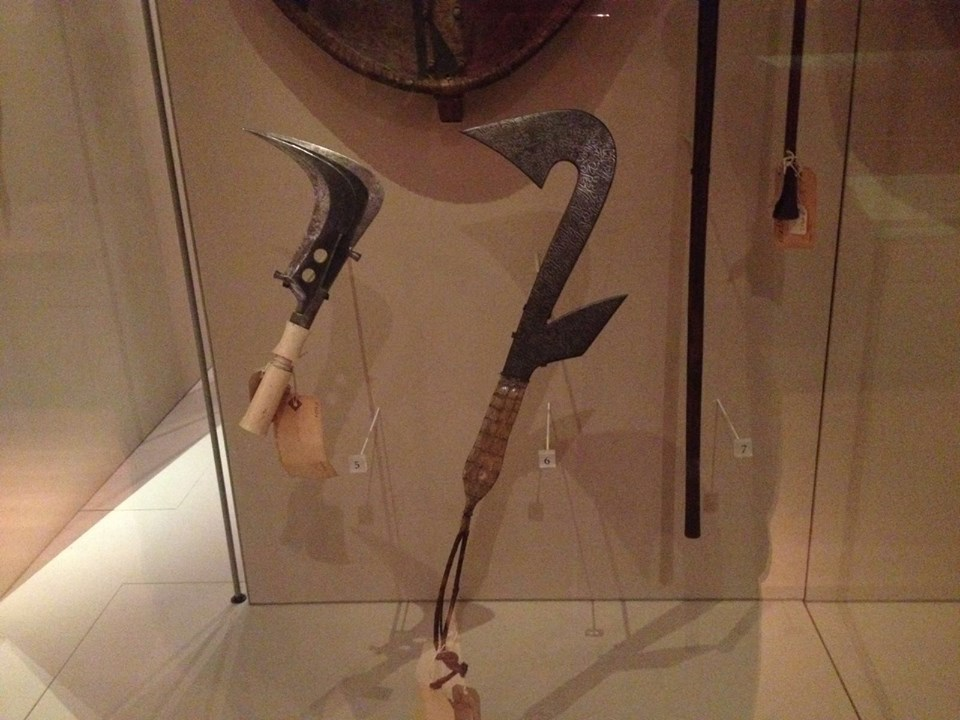
Congolese sickle, or Trumbash, (left) and replica throwing knife (right) at Manchester Museum.

Indigenous sickles have been discovered in southwest North America with unique design. There is evidence that Kodiak islanders had for cutting grass "sickles made of a sharpened animal shoulder blade". The artifacts found in present-day Arizona and New Mexico resemble curved tools that were made from the horns of mountain sheep.

A similar site discovered sickles made from other material such as the Caddo Sickle, which was made from a deer mandible. Scripture from early natives document the use of these sickles in the cutting of grass. The instruments ranged 13–16 in (330–410 mm) from tip to haft. Several other digs in eastern Arizona uncovered wooden sickles that were shaped in a similar fashion. The handles of the tools help describe how the tool was held in such a way so that the inner portion that contained the cutting surface could also serve as a gathering surface for the grain. Sickles were sharpened by scraping a shape beveled edge with a coarse tool. This action has left marks on artifacts that have been found. The sharpening process was necessary to keep the cutting edge from being dulled after extended use. The edge is seen to be quite highly polished, which in part proves that the instrument was used to cut grass.

After collection, the grass was used as material to create matting and bedding. The sickle in general provided the convenience of cutting the grass as well as gathering in one step. In modern times, the sickle is being used in South America as tool to harvest rice. Rice clusters are harvested using the instrument and left to dry in the sun.

== Nepal ==
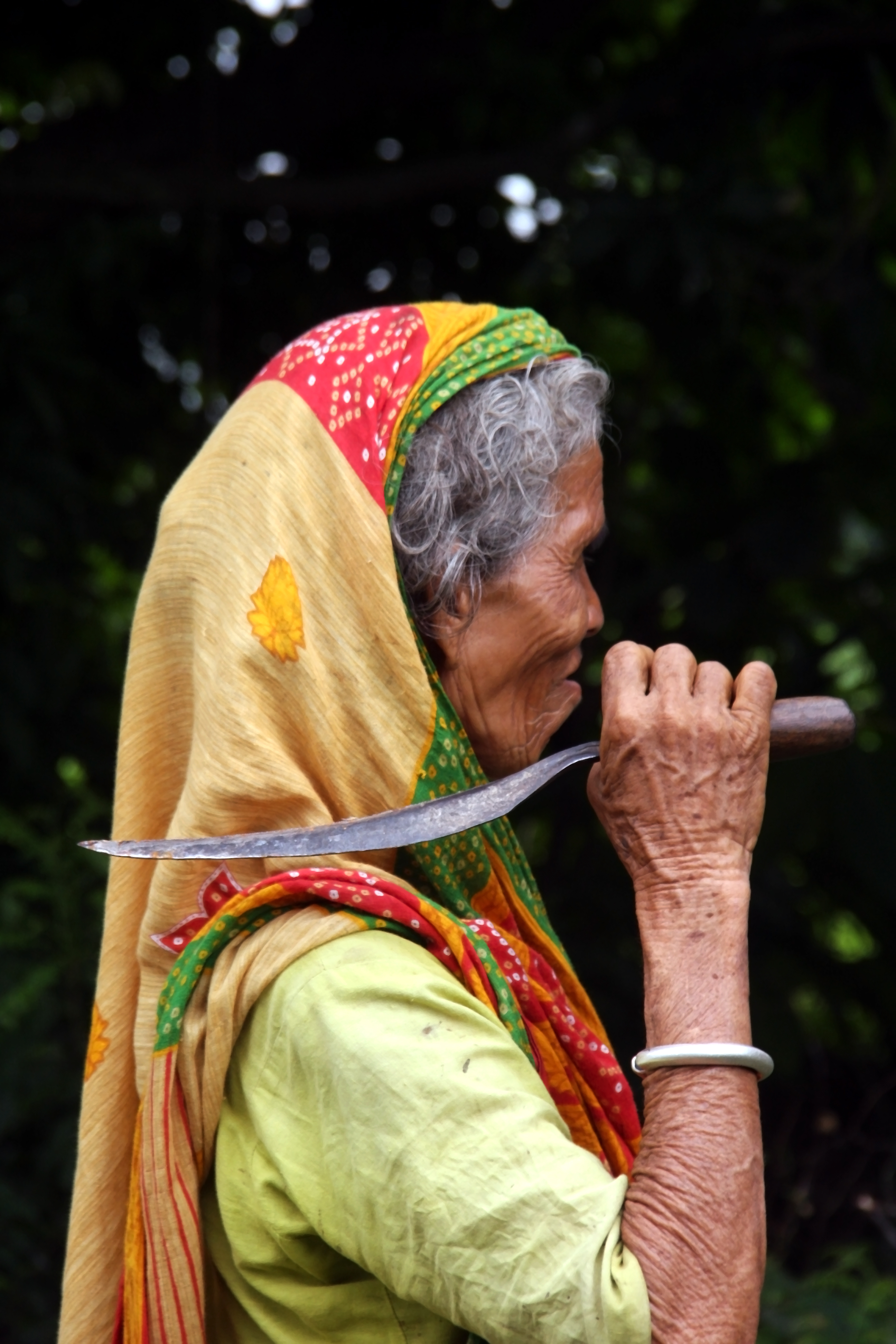
A village lady holding 'Hasiya' (sickle) in Saptari, Nepal.

Called Hasiya (or Aasi), a sickle is very common in Nepal as the most important tool for cutting used in the kitchen and in the fields. Hasiya is used in the kitchen in many villages of Nepal where its used to cut vegetables during food prep. The handle of Hasiya (made of wood) is held pressed by the toe of one's foot and the curve inverted so vegetables can be cut with two hands while rocking the vegetable. Outside of home, Hasiya is used for harvesting.

Hasiya have traditionally been made by local blacksmiths in their charcoal foundries that use leather bellows to blow air. Sharpening of the Hasiya is done by rubbing the edges against a smooth rock or taken back to the blacksmith. Sharpening of the Hasiya is generally done during the beginning of the harvesting season.

Bigger Hasiya is called Khurpa (or Khoorpa) where the curve is less pronounced, is much heavier and is used to sever branches of trees with leaves (for animal feed), chop meat etc. The famous Nepali Khukuri is also a type of sickle where the curve becomes least visible.

Carrying around a sharp and naked Hasiya or Khurpa is unsafe. So Nepalis have traditionally built a cover/holder for it called "Khurpeto" (meaning Khurpa holder in Nepali). It could be a simple piece of wood with a hole big enough to slide the blade of Hasiya inside or could be an intricately carved piece of round wood slung around one's waist with a string made of plants (called "hatteuri"). Nowadays though many use cotton, jute or even cloth strings as a replacement of hatteuri which is not easy to find.

== Serrated ''Simple'' or "toothed" sickles ==
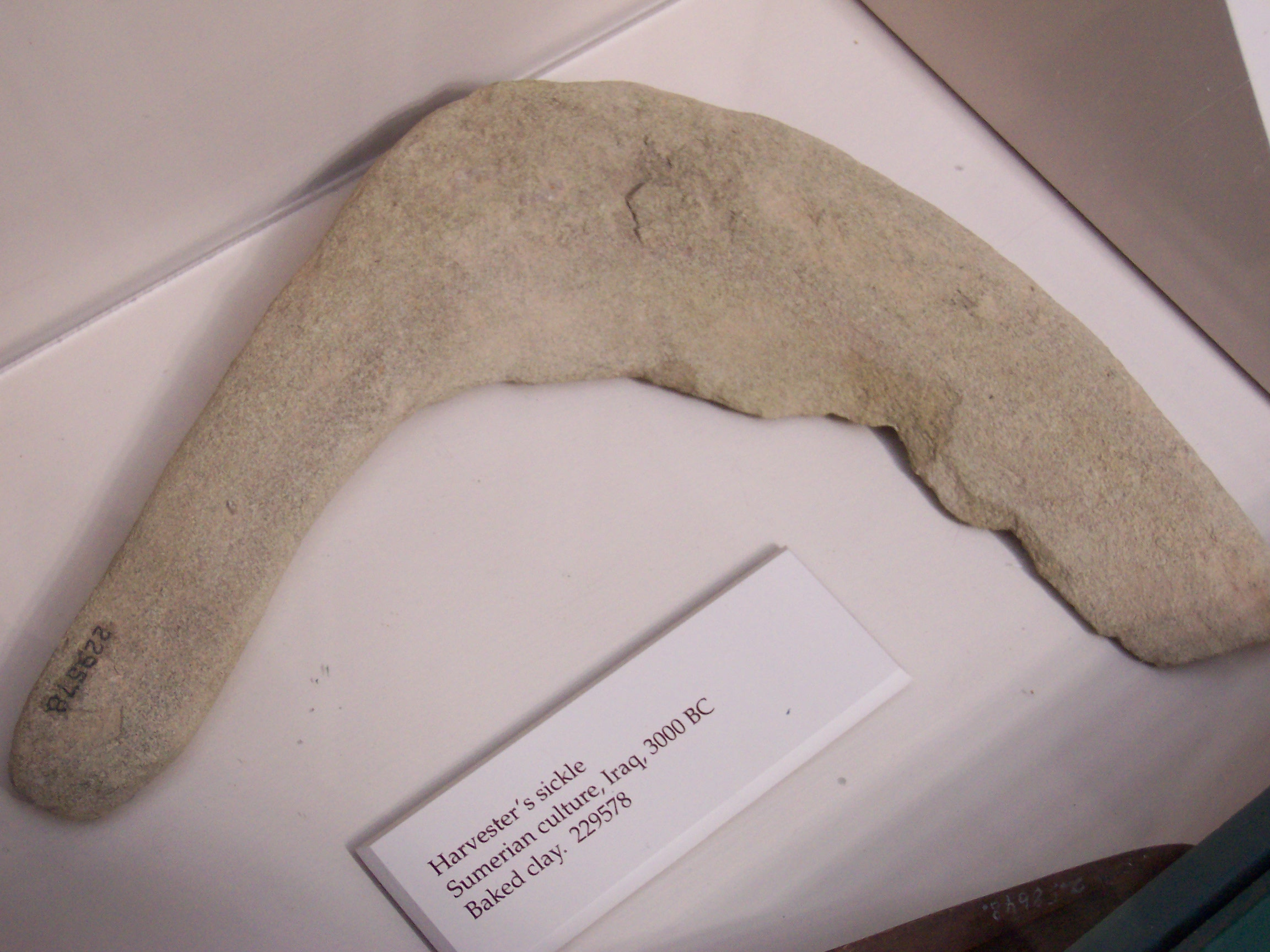
Sumerian harvesting sickle, c. 3000BC

The genealogy of serrated-edge sickles reaches back to the Stone Age, when humans first attached individual pieces of flint to a "blade body" of wood or bone. (The majority among the well-documented specimens made later of bronze are smooth-edged.) Nevertheless, teeth have been cut with hand-held chisels into iron- and later steel-bladed sickles for a long time. In many countries on the African continent, in Central and South America as well as in the Near, Middle and Far East this is still the case in the regions within these large geographies where the traditional village blacksmith remains alive and well.

England appears to have been the first to develop the industrial process of serration-making. Then, by 1897, the Redtenbacher Company of Scharnstein, in Austria—at that time the largest scythe-maker in the world—designed its own machine for the job, becoming the only Austrian source of serrated sickles. In 1942, its recently acquired sister-company Krenhof also began to produce these. In 1970, a year before the sickle-production branch of Redtenbacher was sold to Ethiopia, they were still making 1.5 million of the serrated sickles per year, predominately for markets in Africa and Latin America. There were other enterprises in Austria, of course, which produced the smoothed-edged sickles for centuries. The last of the classical "round" versions were forged until the mid-1980s and machined until 2002.

While in Central Europe the smooth-edged sickle—either forged or machined (alternately referred to as "stamped") - has been the only one used (and in many regions the only one known), the Iberian Peninsula, Sicily and Greece long had fans of both camps. The many small family-owned enterprises in the areas of present-day Italy, Portugal and Spain produced sickles in both versions, with the teeth on the serrated models being hand-cut, one at a time, until the mid-20th century.

The Falci Co. of Italy (Note: The Italian word falci means "scythes" or "sickles".) (established in 1921 as a union of several formerly independent forges) developed its own unique method of industrial-scale serrated-sickle production in 1965. Its innovations, which included a tapered blade cross-section (thicker at the back - for strength - gradually thinning towards the edge - for ease of penetration) were later adopted by Europe's largest sickle producer in Spain as well as, more recently, by a company in India.

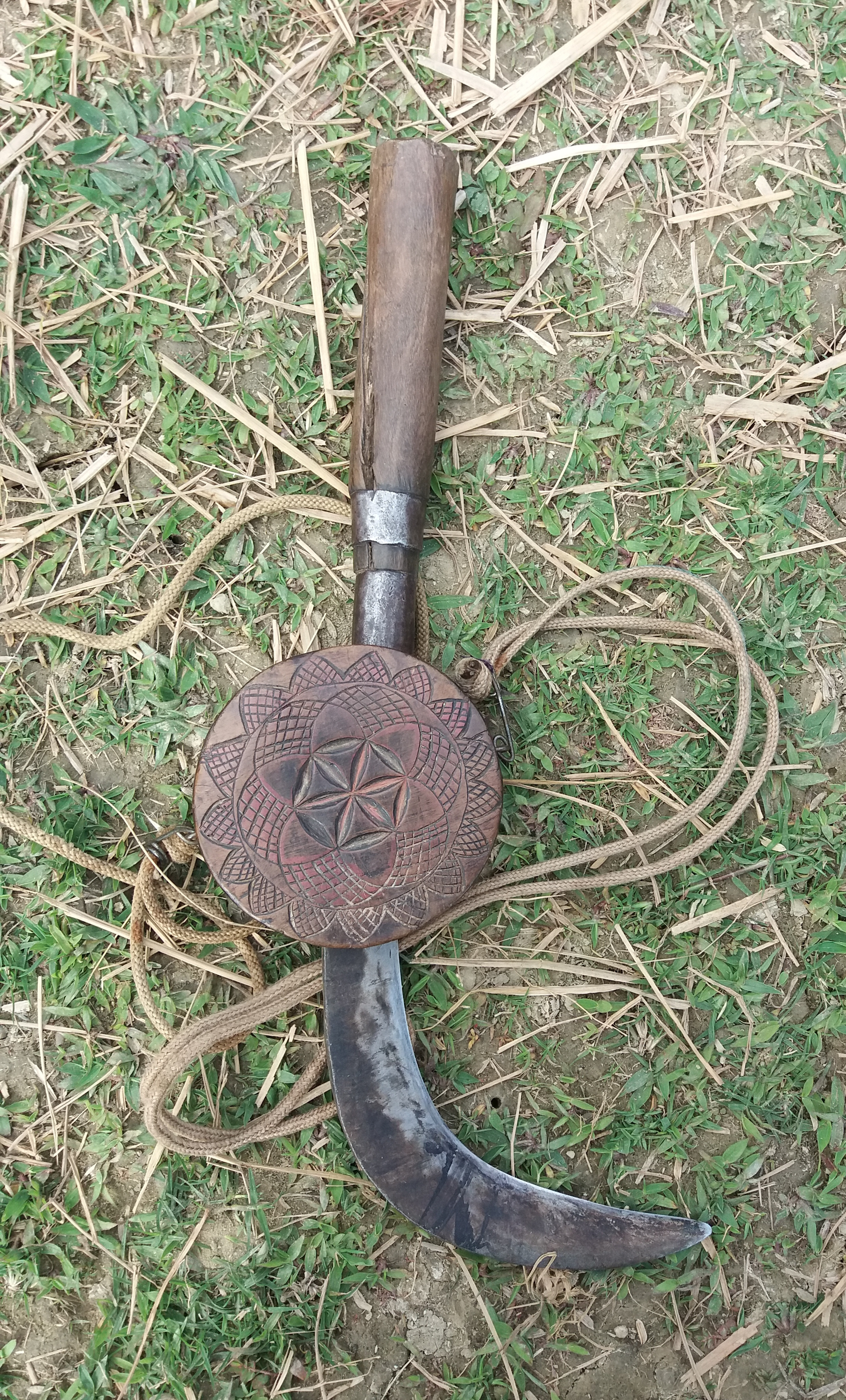
Nepali sickle (hasiya) with its carrier (khurpeto)

== Use ==
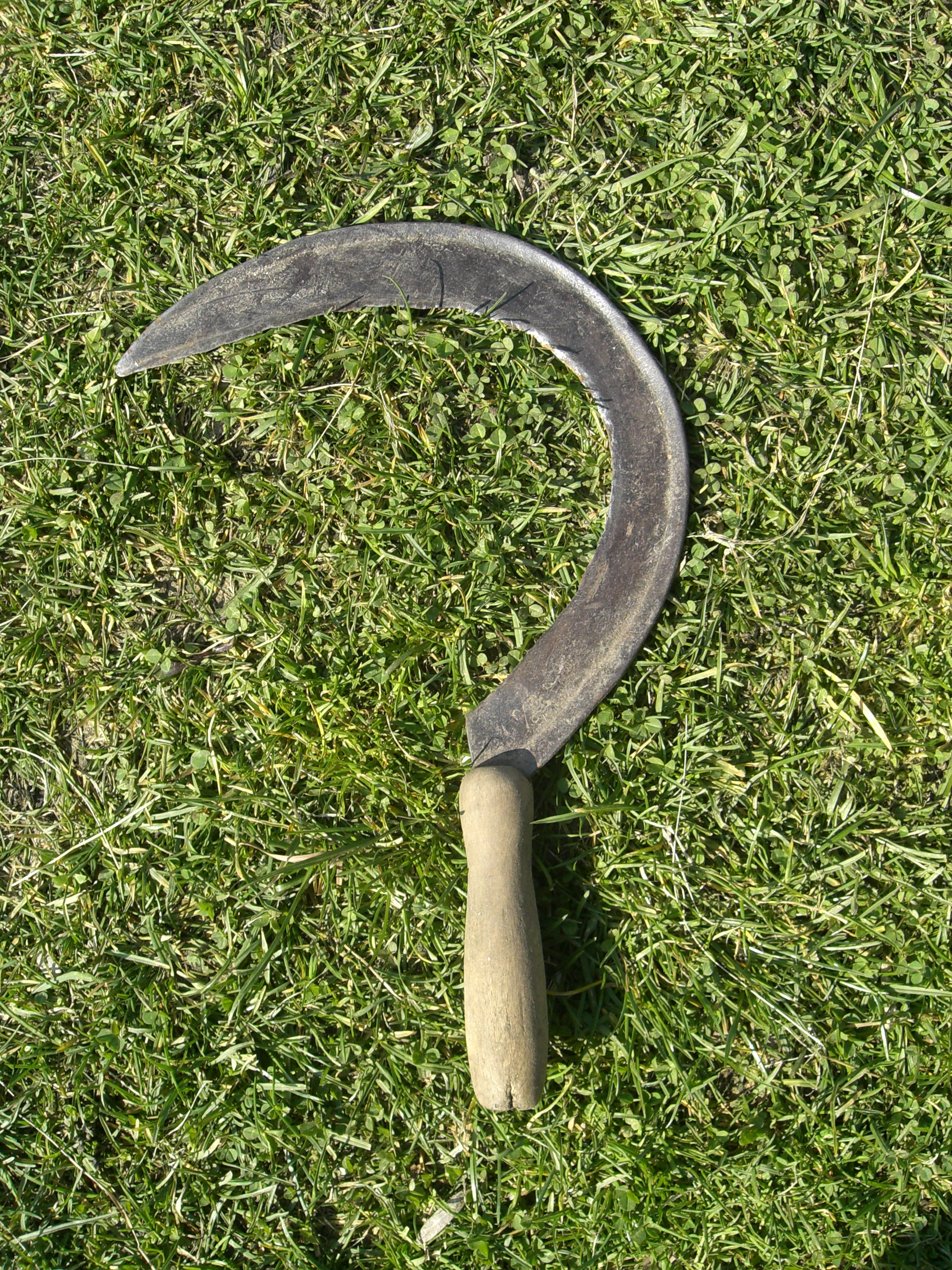
Modern harvesting sickle

The inside of the blade's curve is sharp, so that the user can either draw or swing it against the base of the crop, catching the stems in the curve and slicing them at the same time. The material to be cut may be held in a bunch in the other hand (for example when reaping), held in place by a wooden stick, or left free. When held in a bunch, the sickle action is typically towards the user (left to right for a right-handed user), but when used free the sickle is usually swung the opposite way. Other colloquial/regional names for principally the same tool are: grasshook, swap hook, rip-hook, slash-hook, reaping hook, brishing hook or bagging hook.

A serrated sickle was used for harvesting wheat, the ears being held bunched up in the free hand as described above. After this the straw was cut with a scythe. Oats and barley on the other hand were simply scythed. The reason for this is that wheat straw, unlike that of oats or barley, whose softer straw was suitable only for bedding or fodder, was a valuable crop, used for thatching, and subjecting it to the battering of a flail would have rendered it useless for this purpose.

The blades of sickle models intended primarily for the cutting of grass are sometimes "cranked", meaning they are off-set downwards from the handle, which makes it easier to keep the blade closer to the ground. Sickles used for reaping would not benefit from this feature because cereals are usually not cut as close to the ground surface; instead, what distinguishes this latter group is their often (though not always) serrated edges.

A blade which is used regularly to cut the silica-rich stems of cereal crops acquires a characteristic sickle-gloss, or wear pattern.

=== As a weapon ===
Like other farming tools, the sickle can be used as an improvised bladed weapon. Examples include the Japanese kusarigama and kama, the Chinese chicken sickles, and the makraka of the Zande people of north central Africa. Paulus Hector Mair, the author of a German Renaissance combat manual also has a chapter about fighting with sickles. It is particularly prevalent in the martial arts of Malaysia, Indonesia and the Philippines. In Indonesia, the native sickle known as celurit or clurit is commonly associated with the Madurese people, used for both fighting and as a domestic tool.

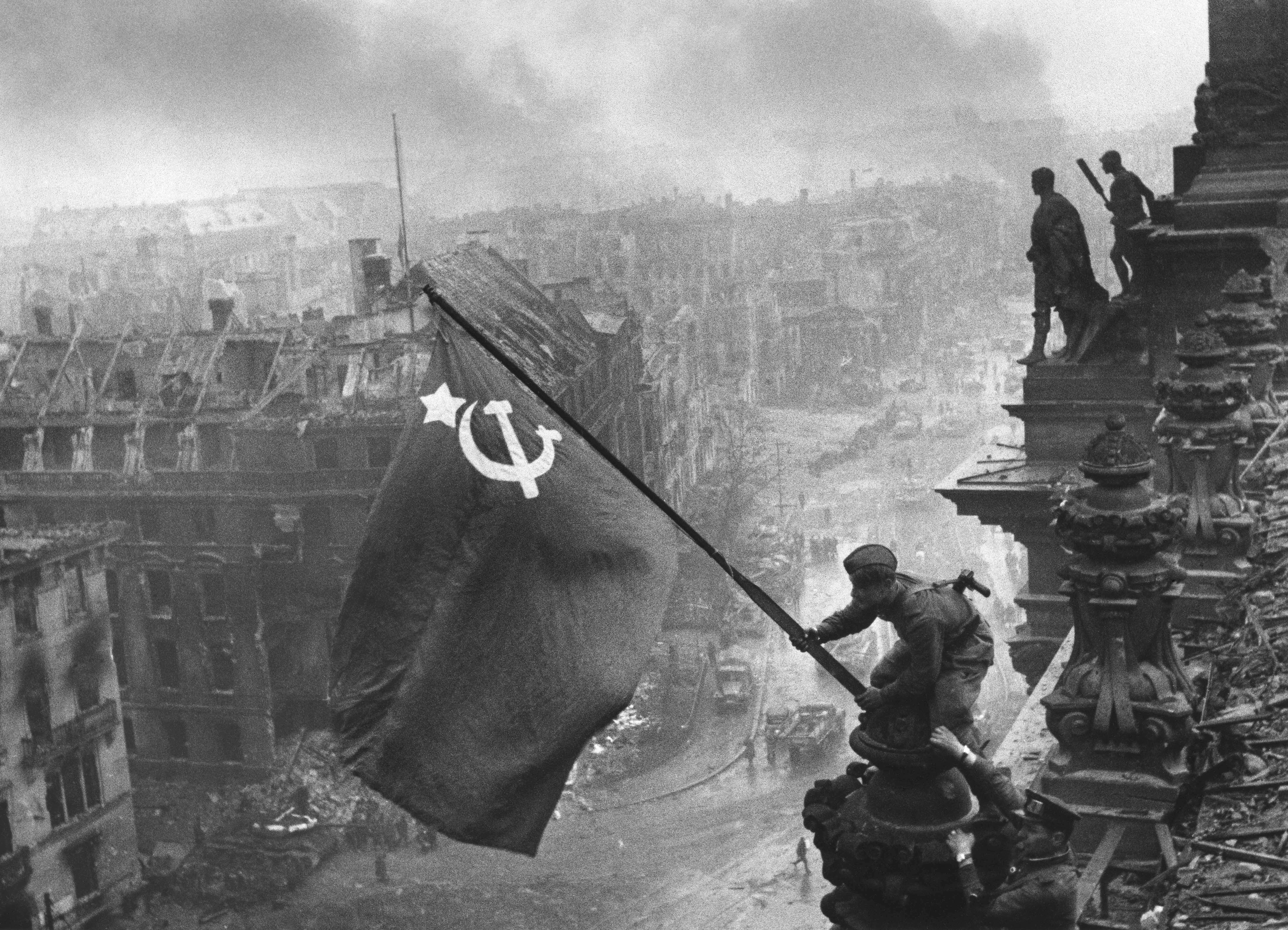
Communist flag showing "hammer and sickle" design. The photograph is known as Raising a Flag over the Reichstag and represents liberation from the nazis.

=== Other uses ===
- The hammer and sickle is a communist symbol representing proletarian solidarity, a union between the peasantry and the urban working class. It was first adapted during the Russian Revolution, the hammer representing the industrial workers, and the sickle representing the farmers/peasants.
- The emblem of the Grim Reaper is sometimes portrayed as carrying a sickle rather than the more traditional scythe.
- Pliny the Elder reports that golden sickles were used in Druidic rituals.
- Paulus Hector Mair's Manuscript Dresd. C 93 includes a section regarding the martial application of the sickle.
- Three (or two) entwined sickles were the heraldic badge of the medieval Hungerford family.

== Bagging hook ==
A bagging hook, badging hook, fagging hook, reap hook or rip hook, is a large sickle usually with an offset handle so that the user's knuckles do not make contact with the ground. The Oxford dictionary gives the definition of the word to bag, or badge, as the cutting of grain by hand. The blade is heavier than that of a normal sickle and always without serrated blades. It is usually about 40 mm (1.6 in) wide with an open crescent shaped blade approx 45 cm (18 in) across. It developed from the sickle in most parts of Britain during the mid to late 19th century, and was in turn replaced by the scythe, later by the reaping machine and subsequently the swather. It was still used when the corn was bent over or flattened and the mechanical reaper was unable to cut without causing the grain to fall from the ears and wasting the crop.

It was also used in lieu of the bean hook or pea hook for cutting field beans and other leguminous crops that were used for fodder and bedding for livestock.

Sometimes confused with the heavier and straighter billhook used for cutting wood or laying hedges. While the scythe or bagging hook blade was heavy enough to remove young growth instead of, say, shears for clipping a hedge, it was not strong enough to cut woody material for which the stronger, similarly shaped, but longer handled, staff hook was used. Many variations in blade shape were used in different parts of England and known under a variety of names. Its close relations in shape and usage are the grass hook and the reap hook.

== See also ==
A rooster holding sickle in the coat of arms of Laitila.

- Shotel, the traditional Ethiopian sickle sword
- Aruval, an Indian instrument similar to the billhook
- Billhook, a version of the sickle used for cutting woody stems
- Brush hook
- Kaiser blade or sling blade
- Kama
- Machete
- Scythe
- Hammer and sickle, a symbol in communism
- Harpe, a Greek or Roman long sickle or scythe
- Khopesh, an Egyptian long sickle or scythe as a weapon
- Paulus Hector Mair
