= Wadi Tahuna =

Archaeological site in Palestine

Wadi Tahuna is an archaeological site of the Tahunian culture that was excavated in 1928 by Denis Buzy, several kilometers south to Bethlehem in Palestine.
